= 2022 Hamilton Tiger-Cats season =

Canadian football team season

- General manager: Orlondo Steinauer
- President: Scott Mitchell
- Head coach: Orlondo Steinauer
- Home stadium: Tim Hortons Field

Results
- Record: 8–10
- Division place: 3rd, East
- Playoffs: Lost East Semi-Final
- Team MOP: Tim White
- Team MODP: Jovan Santos-Knox
- Team MOC: Tunde Adeleke
- Team MOOL: Brandon Revenberg
- Team MOST: Seth Small
- Team MOR: Seth Small

Uniform
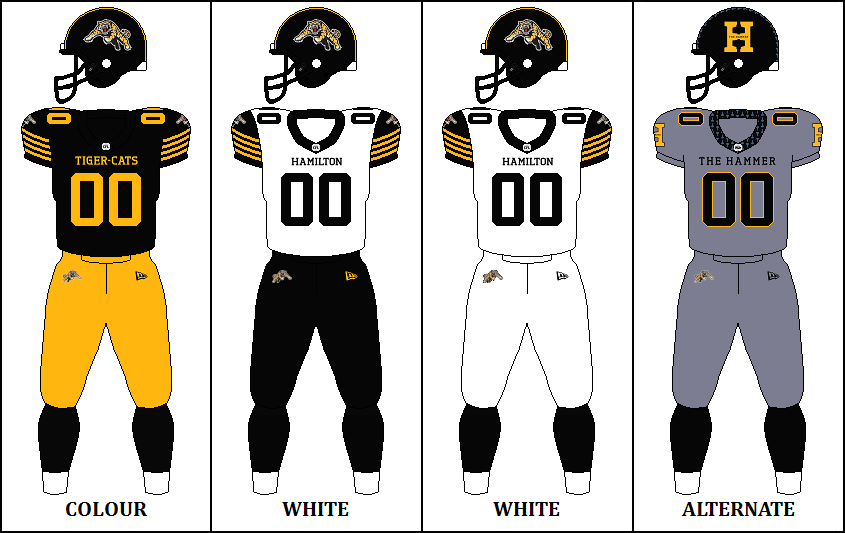

The 2022 Hamilton Tiger-Cats season was the 64th season for the team in the Canadian Football League (CFL) and their 72nd overall. The Tiger-Cats qualified for the playoffs for the fourth consecutive year in Week 20 following a win over the Ottawa Redblacks and a loss by the Saskatchewan Roughriders. However, the team lost in the East Semi-Final to the Montreal Alouettes.

The 2022 season was the third season under head coach Orlondo Steinauer and the first with Steinauer leading the personnel department as the president of football operations.

== Offseason ==
=== Players added ===
Position	Player	Tag	2021 Team	Date
QB	Jamie Newman	Signed	Hamilton Tiger-Cats	January 7
WR	Tony Brown	Signed	Hamilton Tiger-Cats	January 7
K	Tadhg Leader	Signed	Hamilton Tiger-Cats	March 17

=== Players lost ===
Position	Player	Tag	2022 Team	Date
OT	Jordan Murray	Released	Indianapolis Colts	January 14
FB/TE	Nikola Kalinic	Released	Indianapolis Colts	January 22
CB	Delvin Breaux	Released	BC Lions	January 17
QB	Jeremiah Masoli	Released	Ottawa Redblacks	February 7
C	Darius Ciraco	Released	Ottawa Redblacks	February 8
DE	Lorenzo Mauldin IV	Released	Ottawa Redblacks	February 8
WR	Jaelon Acklin	Released	Ottawa Redblacks	February 9
RB	Jackson Bennett	Released	Ottawa Redblacks	February 8
WR	Brandon Banks	Released	Toronto Argonauts	February 13
DE	Ja'Gared Davis	Released	Toronto Argonauts	February 8
FS/LB	Tyrice Beverette	Released	Montreal Alouettes	February 8
CB	Mike Daly	UFA	Free Agent	February 20
QB	David Watford	UFA	Free Agent	February 25

=== CFL global draft ===
The 2022 CFL global draft took place on May 3, 2022. With the format being a snake draft, the Tiger-Cats selected ninth in the odd-numbered rounds and first in the even-numbered rounds.

Round	Pick	Player	Position	University/Club Team	Nationality
1	9	Baily Flint	P	Toledo	Australia
2	10	Blake Hayes	P	Illinois	Australia
3	27	Ralfs Rusins	DT	Liberty	Latvia

== CFL national draft ==
The 2022 CFL draft took place on May 3, 2022. The Tiger-Cats were scheduled to have the eighth selection in each of the eight rounds of the draft after finishing as the Grey Cup runner-up in the previous season. However, the team traded their first and third round selections to the Edmonton Elks for Kyle Saxelid and Grant McDonald.

Round	Pick	Player	Position	University Team	Hometown
2	17	Anthony Federico	DL	Queen's	Niagara Falls, ON
4	37	Kiondre Smith	WR	Guelph	Markham, ON
5	46	Jared Beeksma	LB	Guelph	Cambridge, ON
6	55	Khadeem Pierre	DB	Concordia	Ottawa, ON
7	64	Nicolas Guay	OL	Laval	Quebec City, QC
8	73	Jaxon Ciraolo-Brown	DB	British Columbia	Hamilton, ON

== Preseason ==
=== Schedule ===
Week	Game	Date	Kickoff	Opponent	Results		TV	Venue	Attendance	Summary
Week	Game	Date	Kickoff	Opponent	Score	Record	TV	Venue	Attendance	Summary
A	1	Sat, May 28	7:00 p.m. EDT	vs. Montreal Alouettes	W 25–23	1–0	None	Tim Hortons Field	N/A	Recap
B	2	Fri, June 3	7:30 p.m. EDT	at Toronto Argonauts	L 17–18	1–1	None	Alumni Stadium	N/A	Recap

# Games played with white uniforms.

== Regular season ==
=== Season standings ===
East Division
Team	GP	W	L	T	Pts	PF	PA	Div	Stk	
Toronto Argonauts	18	11	7	0	22	443	415	7–3	L1	Details
Montreal Alouettes	18	9	9	0	18	471	466	5–5	W1	Details
Hamilton Tiger-Cats	18	8	10	0	16	421	473	5–5	W4	Details
Ottawa Redblacks	18	4	14	0	8	370	475	3–7	L3	Details

=== Season schedule ===
Week	Game	Date	Kickoff	Opponent	Results		TV	Venue	Attendance	Summary
Week	Game	Date	Kickoff	Opponent	Score	Record	TV	Venue	Attendance	Summary
1	1	Sat, June 11	7:00 p.m. EDT	at Saskatchewan Roughriders	L 13–30	0–1	TSN	Mosaic Stadium	28,216	Recap
2	2	Sat, June 18	6:30 p.m. EDT	vs. Calgary Stampeders	L 30–33 (OT)	0–2	TSN	Tim Hortons Field	22,711	Recap
3	3	Fri, June 24	8:30 p.m. EDT	at Winnipeg Blue Bombers	L 12–26	0–3	TSN/ESPN2	IG Field	23,600	Recap
4	4	Fri, July 1	7:30 p.m. EDT	vs. Edmonton Elks	L 25–29	0–4	TSN	Tim Hortons Field	20,233	Recap
5	Bye									
6	5	Sat, July 16	5:00 p.m. EDT	vs. Ottawa Redblacks	W 25–23	1–4	TSN/RDS	Tim Hortons Field	20,411	Recap
7	6	Thu, July 21	10:00 p.m. EDT	at BC Lions	L 12–17	1–5	TSN	BC Place	16,155	Recap
8	7	Thu, July 28	7:30 p.m. EDT	vs. Montreal Alouettes	W 24–17	2–5	TSN/RDS	Tim Hortons Field	20,932	Recap
9	8	Sat, Aug 6	7:00 p.m. EDT	at Toronto Argonauts	L 20–34	2–6	TSN/ESPN2	BMO Field	11,623	Recap
10	9	Fri, Aug 12	7:30 p.m. EDT	vs. Toronto Argonauts	W 34–27	3–6	TSN/RDS	Tim Hortons Field	23,018	Recap
11	10	Sat, Aug 20	4:00 p.m. EDT	at Montreal Alouettes	L 28–29	3–7	TSN/RDS	Molson Stadium	21,024	Recap
12	11	Fri, Aug 26	7:30 p.m. EDT	at Toronto Argonauts	L 20–37	3–8	TSN/RDS	BMO Field	14,963	Recap
13	12	Mon, Sept 5	1:00 p.m. EDT	vs. Toronto Argonauts	L 8–28	3–9	TSN/RDS2	Tim Hortons Field	25,266	Recap
14	Bye									
15	13	Sat, Sept 17	4:00 p.m. EDT	vs. Winnipeg Blue Bombers	W 48–31	4–9	TSN/RDS	Tim Hortons Field	22,288	Recap
16	14	Fri, Sept 23	7:30 p.m. EDT	at Montreal Alouettes	L 16–23	4–10	TSN/RDS/ESPN2	Molson Stadium	17,008	Recap
17	Bye									
18	15	Fri, Oct 7	7:30 p.m. EDT	vs. Saskatchewan Roughriders	W 18–14	5–10	TSN/RDS2	Tim Hortons Field	21,456	Recap
19	16	Fri, Oct 14	9:45 p.m. EDT	at Calgary Stampeders	W 35–32	6–10	TSN	McMahon Stadium	20,589	Recap
20	17	Fri, Oct 21	7:00 p.m. EDT	vs. Ottawa Redblacks	W 30–27	7–10	TSN/RDS2	Tim Hortons Field	24,062	Recap
21	18	Sat, Oct 29	5:00 p.m. EDT	at Ottawa Redblacks	W 23–16	8–10	TSN/RDS	TD Place Stadium	19,708	Recap

# Games played with colour uniforms.
# Games played with white uniforms.
# Games played with alternate uniforms.

== Post-season ==
=== Schedule ===
Game	Date	Kickoff	Opponent	Results		TV	Venue	Attendance	Summary
Game	Date	Kickoff	Opponent	Score	Record	TV	Venue	Attendance	Summary
East Semi-Final	Sun, Nov 6	1:00 p.m. EST	at Montreal Alouettes	L 17–28	0–1	TSN/RDS/ESPN2	Molson Stadium	20,693	Recap

# Games played with white uniforms.

== Roster ==
2022 Hamilton Tiger-Cats final roster
**Quarterbacks**: 9 Dane Evans; 14 Jamie Newman; 18 Matt Shiltz; **Running backs**: 38 Félix Garand-Gauthier; 34 Wes Hills; 31 Sean Thomas Erlington; **Receivers**: 8 Steven Dunbar; 1 Lemar Durant; 84 Anthony Johnson; 85 Kiondré Smith; 88 Tyler Ternowski; 12 Tim White	**Offensive linemen**: 51 David Beard C; 69 Colin Kelly T; 59 Kay Okafor G/T/DT; 57 Brandon Revenberg G; 62 Tyrone Riley T; 56 Kyle Saxelid T; 54 Chris Van Zeyl T; 64 Coulter Woodmansey G/C; **Defensive linemen**: 90 Mason Bennett DE; 93 Malik Carney DE; 94 Mohamed Diallo DT; 91 Anthony Federico DE; 95 Julian Howsare DE; 6 Micha Johnson DT; 97 Ted Laurent DT; 48 Cedric Wilcots DE	**Linebackers**: 36 Bailey Feltmate; 21 Simoni Lawrence; 42 Myles Manalo; 29 Grant McDonald; 45 Jovan Santos-Knox; 15 Kyle Wilson; **Defensive backs**: 2 Tunde Adeleke; 26 Cariel Brooks; 7 Ciante Evans; 30 Stavros Katsantonis; 11 Kameron Kelly; 23 Richard Leonard; 25 Jumal Rolle; 37 Lawrence Woods	**Special teams**: 41 Blake Hayes P; 47 Seth Small K; 58 Gordon Whyte LS; **Practice roster**: 27 Jared Beeksma LB; 96 Ronheen Bingham DE; 86 Tony Brown WR; 24 Tony Collier DB; 35 Mike Daly DB; 13 Jalen Morton QB; 92 Chris Mulumba DT; 32 Rodney Randle DB; 43 Jarek Richards LB; 22 Will Sunderland DB; 40 McKinley Williams DT	**Injured list**: 0 Bralon Addison SB; 3 Jake Burt FB; 49 Tre' Crawford DE; 39 Nic Cross LB; 19 Michael Domagala P/K; 53 Alex Fontana C; 77 Valentin Gnahoua DE; 80 Terry Godwin WR; 5 Don Jackson RB; 28 Vosean Joseph LB; 66 Brandon Kemp T; 44 Curtis Newton LB; 83 David Ungerer WR; 4 Papi White SB; 98 Dylan Wynn DT; **Suspended list**: 52 Tyler Johnson DT; 62 Korren Kirven G
Italics indicate American player • **Bold** indicates Global player

== Coaching staff ==
Hamilton Tiger-Cats staff
Front office: Caretaker – Bob Young; Chief executive officer – Scott Mitchell; President and chief operating officer – Matt Afinec; President of football operations and head coach – Orlondo Steinauer; Assistant general manager and director of canadian scouting – Drew Allemang; Assistant general manager and director of player personnel – Spencer Zimmerman; Assistant general manager and senior advisor – Ed Hervey; Assistant director of player personnel – Spencer Boehm; Director of football administration and operations – Tamara Hinic; Video co-ordinator – Matt Allemang; Assistant video co-ordinator – Nick Roberto; Head coach: Head coach – Orlondo Steinauer; Assistant head coach – Tommy Condell; Assistant head coach – Mark Washington; Offensive coaches: Offensive Coordinator & Quarterbacks – Tommy Condell; Offensive line – Mike Gibson; Wide receivers – Jason Phillips; Running backs – Jarryd Baines; Offensive assistant – Casey Creehan	Defensive coaches: Defensive coordinator – Mark Washington; Defensive line – Randy Melvin; Linebackers – Robin Ross; Defensive backs – Jykine Bradley; Assistant defensive backs – Craig Butler; Special teams coaches: Special teams coordinator – Craig Butler; Special teams assistant – Casey Creehan; Strength and conditioning: Strength and conditioning coach – Chuck Winters; → Coaching staff
