= 2021 Hamilton Tiger-Cats season =

Canadian football team season

- General manager: Drew Allemang and Shawn Burke
- Head coach: Orlondo Steinauer
- Home stadium: Tim Hortons Field

Results
- Record: 8–6
- Division place: 2nd, East
- Playoffs: Lost Grey Cup
- Team MOP: Simoni Lawrence
- Team MODP: Simoni Lawrence
- Team MOC: Tunde Adeleke
- Team MOOL: Brandon Revenberg
- Team MOST: Nic Cross
- Team MOR: Desmond Lawrence

Uniform

The 2021 Hamilton Tiger-Cats season was the 63rd season for the team in the Canadian Football League (CFL) and their 71st overall. The Tiger-Cats qualified for the playoffs for the third consecutive year following their week 14 win over the BC Lions on November 5, 2021. The team defeated the Montreal Alouettes and Toronto Argonauts in the playoffs to qualify for their 22nd Grey Cup game appearance. In a rematch of the previous season's game against the Winnipeg Blue Bombers, the Tiger-Cats lost to the Blue Bombers 33–25 in overtime in the 108th Grey Cup game.

The 2021 season was the second season under co-general managers Drew Allemang and Shawn Burke and the second season under head coach Orlondo Steinauer.

An 18-game season schedule was originally released on November 20, 2020, but it was announced on April 21, 2021 that the start of the season would likely be delayed until August and feature a 14-game schedule. On June 15, 2021, the league released the revised 14-game schedule with regular season play beginning on August 5, 2021.

== Offseason ==
=== CFL global draft ===
The 2021 CFL global draft took place on April 15, 2021. With the format being a snake draft, the Tiger-Cats selected eighth in the odd-numbered rounds and second in the even-numbered rounds.

| Round | Pick | Player | Position | University/Club Team | Nationality |
|---|---|---|---|---|---|
| 1 | 8 | Joel Whitford | P | Washington | Australia |
| 2 | 11 | Chris Mulumba | DL | Colorado | Finland |
| 3 | 26 | David Izinyon | LB | Rostock Griffins | (United Kingdom) Great Britain |
| 4 | 29 | Dominik Eberle | K | Utah State | Germany |

=== CFL national draft ===
The 2021 CFL draft took place on May 4, 2021. The Tiger-Cats had the most selections in the six-round draft with seven picks after acquiring another first-round pick (ninth overall) from the Montreal Alouettes as part of the Johnny Manziel trade. The team had the first pick in odd rounds and the ninth pick in even rounds.

| Round | Pick | Player | Position | University team | Hometown |
|---|---|---|---|---|---|
| 1 | 1 | Jake Burt | TE | Boston College | Lynnfield, MA |
| 1 | 9 | Nick Cross | LB | British Columbia | Regina, SK |
| 2 | 18 | Deane Leonard | DB | Mississippi | Calgary, AB |
| 3 | 19 | Mohamed Diallo | DL | Central Michigan | Toronto, ON |
| 4 | 36 | Jarek Richards | LB | Saint Mary's | Montreal, QC |
| 5 | 37 | Felix Garand-Gauthier | FB | Laval | Mirabel, QC |
| 6 | 54 | Myles Manalo | LB | Western | Burlington, ON |

== Preseason ==
Due to the shortening of the season, the CFL confirmed that pre-season games would not be played in 2021.

=== Planned schedule ===
| Week | Game | Date | Kickoff | Opponent | TV | Venue |
|---|---|---|---|---|---|---|
| A | Bye | | | | | |
| B | 1 | Thu, May 27 | 7:30 p.m. EDT | at Toronto Argonauts | NA | BMO Field |
| C | 2 | Thu, June 3 | 7:30 p.m. EDT | vs. Toronto Argonauts | NA | Tim Hortons Field |

== Regular season ==
=== Season standings ===
East Division
| Team | GP | W | L | T | Pts | PF | PA | Div | Stk | |
|---|---|---|---|---|---|---|---|---|---|---|
| Toronto Argonauts | 14 | 9 | 5 | 0 | 18 | 309 | 318 | 6–2 | L1 | Details |
| Hamilton Tiger-Cats | 14 | 8 | 6 | 0 | 16 | 312 | 244 | 4–4 | W1 | Details |
| Montreal Alouettes | 14 | 7 | 7 | 0 | 14 | 356 | 295 | 5–3 | L1 | Details |
| Ottawa Redblacks | 14 | 3 | 11 | 0 | 6 | 224 | 384 | 1–7 | W1 | Details |

=== Season schedule ===
The Tiger-Cats initially had a schedule that featured 18 regular season games beginning on June 10 and ending on October 29. However, due to the COVID-19 pandemic in Canada, the Canadian Football League delayed the start of the regular season to August 5, 2021 and the Tiger-Cats began their 14-game season on August 5, 2021.

| Week | Game | Date | Kickoff | Opponent | Results | | TV | Venue | Attendance | Summary |
| Week | Game | Date | Kickoff | Opponent | Score | Record | TV | Venue | Attendance | Summary |
|---|---|---|---|---|---|---|---|---|---|---|
| 1 | 1 | Thu, Aug 5 | 8:30 p.m. EDT | @ Winnipeg Blue Bombers | L 6–19 | 0–1 | TSN/ESPN2 | IG Field | 29,376 | Recap |
| 2 | 2 | Sat, Aug 14 | 10:00 p.m. EDT | @ Saskatchewan Roughriders | L 8–30 | 0–2 | TSN/ESPNews | Mosaic Stadium | 27,076 | Recap |
| 3 | Bye | | | | | | | | | |
| 4 | 3 | Fri, Aug 27 | 7:30 p.m. EDT | @ Montreal Alouettes | W 27–10 | 1–2 | TSN/RDS/ESPNews | Molson Stadium | 14,753 | Recap |
| 5 | 4 | Mon, Sept 6 | 1:00 p.m. EDT | Toronto Argonauts | W 32–19 | 2–2 | TSN/RDS2 | Tim Hortons Field | 15,000 | Recap |
| 6 | 5 | Fri, Sept 10 | 7:30 p.m. EDT | @ Toronto Argonauts | L 16–17 | 2–3 | TSN/RDS2 | BMO Field | 9,702 | Recap |
| 7 | 6 | Fri, Sept 17 | 7:00 p.m. EDT | Calgary Stampeders | W 23–17 | 3–3 | TSN/RDS | Tim Hortons Field | 15,000 | Recap |
| 8 | 7 | Wed, Sept 22 | 7:30 p.m. EDT | @ Ottawa Redblacks | W 24–7 | 4–3 | TSN/RDS2 | TD Place Stadium | 12,041 | Recap |
| 9 | 8 | Sat, Oct 2 | 4:00 p.m. EDT | Montreal Alouettes | L 23–20 (OT) | 4–4 | TSN/RDS | Tim Hortons Field | 18,000 | Recap |
| 10 | 9 | Mon, Oct 11 | 4:00 p.m. EDT | Toronto Argonauts | L 23–24 | 4–5 | TSN | Tim Hortons Field | 21,378 | Recap |
| 11 | Bye | | | | | | | | | |
| 12 | 10 | Sat, Oct 23 | 4:00 p.m. EDT | Ottawa Redblacks | W 32–3 | 5–5 | TSN/RDS2 | Tim Hortons Field | 20,112 | Recap |
| 13 | 11 | Fri, Oct 29 | 9:45 p.m. EDT | @ Edmonton Elks | W 39–23 | 6–5 | TSN | Commonwealth Stadium | 22,857 | Recap |
| 14 | 12 | Fri, Nov 5 | 7:00 p.m. EDT | BC Lions | W 26–18 | 7–5 | TSN/RDS | Tim Hortons Field | 21,618 | Recap |
| 15 | 13 | Fri, Nov 12 | 7:30 p.m. EST | @ Toronto Argonauts | L 12–31 | 7–6 | TSN/ESPNews | BMO Field | 10,851 | Recap |
| 16 | 14 | Sat, Nov 20 | 4:00 p.m. EST | Saskatchewan Roughriders | W 24–3 | 8–6 | TSN/RDS | Tim Hortons Field | 22,344 | Recap |

== Post-season ==
=== Schedule ===
| Game | Date | Kickoff | Opponent | Results | | TV | Venue | Attendance | Summary |
| Game | Date | Kickoff | Opponent | Score | Record | TV | Venue | Attendance | Summary |
|---|---|---|---|---|---|---|---|---|---|
| East Semi-Final | Sun, Nov 28 | 1:00 p.m. EST | Montreal Alouettes | W 23–12 | 1–0 | TSN/RDS/ESPN2 | Tim Hortons Field | 21,892 | Recap |
| East Final | Sun, Dec 5 | 12:30 p.m. EST | @ Toronto Argonauts | W 27–19 | 2–0 | TSN/RDS/ESPN2 | BMO Field | 21,492 | Recap |
| 108th Grey Cup | Sun, Dec 12 | 6:00 p.m. EST | Winnipeg Blue Bombers | L 25–33 (OT) | 2–1 | TSN/RDS/ESPN2 | Tim Hortons Field | 26,324 | Recap |

== Roster ==
2021 Hamilton Tiger-Cats final roster
| **Quarterbacks**: 9 Dane Evans; 8 Jeremiah Masoli; **Running backs**: 29 Jackson Bennett; 38 Félix Garand-Gauthier; 5 Don Jackson; 31 Sean Thomas Erlington; **Receivers**: 80 Jaelon Acklin; 16 Brandon Banks; 82 Steven Dunbar; 84 Nikola Kalinic; 88 Tyler Ternowski; 83 David Ungerer; 4 Papi White; 12 Tim White | **Offensive linemen**: 60 Darius Ciraco C; 67 Jesse Gibbon G; 69 Jordan Murray T; 57 Brandon Revenberg G; 54 Chris Van Zeyl T; 50 Travis Vornkahl T; 64 Coulter Woodmansey G/C; **Defensive linemen**: 99 Lee Autry DT; 90 Mason Bennett DE; 93 Malik Carney DE; 56 Ja'Gared Davis DE; 95 Julian Howsare DE; 92 Chris Mulumba DT; 98 Dylan Wynn DT | **Linebackers**: 39 Nic Cross; 36 Bailey Feltmate; 23 Chris Frey; 21 Simoni Lawrence; 44 Curtis Newton; 45 Jovan Santos-Knox; **Defensive backs**: 2 Tunde Adeleke; 28 Tyrice Beverette; 26 Cariel Brooks; 35 Mike Daly; 0 Ciante Evans; 30 Stavros Katsantonis; 11 Kameron Kelly; 25 Jumal Rolle | **Special teams**: 19 Michael Domagala K/P; 32 Joel Whitford P; 58 Gordon Whyte LS; **Injured list**: 86 Bralon Addison SB; 3 Jake Burt FB; 34 Wes Hills RB; 20 Maleek Irons RB; 97 Ted Laurent DT; 24 Des Lawrence DB; 42 Myles Manalo LB; 94 Lorenzo Mauldin DE; 59 Kay Okafor T; 6 David Watford QB; 1 Frankie Williams DB; 27 Kyle Wilson LB | **Practice roster**: 61 Joseph Bencze G; 96 Ronheen Bingham DE; 37 Adonis Davis DB; 18 Gabriel Ferraro K; 77 Valentin Gnahoua DE; 17 Marcus Green SB; 47 David Izinyon DE; 7 Jalin Marshall SB; 13 Jalen Morton QB; 33 Patrick Nelson LB; 43 Jarek Richards LB; 53 Tom Schnitzler DE; 14 Channing Stribling DB; 46 Malcolm Thompson DB; 91 Eddy Wilson DT; 55 John Yarbrough G/C |
Italics indicate American player • **Bold** indicates Global player

== Coaching staff ==
Hamilton Tiger-Cats staff
| Front office: Caretaker – Bob Young; Chief executive officer – Scott Mitchell; President and chief operating officer – Matt Afinec; Sr. Director of Personnel & Co-Manager of Football Operations – Drew Allemang; Sr. Director of Personnel & Co-Manager of Football Operations – Shawn Burke; Director of U.S. Scouting – Spencer Zimmerman; Manager of U.S. Scouting – Rich Massaro; Coordinator, Canadian Scouting – Spencer Boehm; Coordinator, Football Operations – Lucas Brenton; Video co-ordinator – Matt Allemang; Assistant video co-ordinator – Nick Roberto; Head coach: Head coach – Orlondo Steinauer; Offensive coaches: Offensive Coordinator & Quarterbacks – Tommy Condell; Offensive line – Mike Gibson; Wide receivers – Jarryd Baines | Defensive coaches: Defensive coordinator – Mark Washington; Defensive line – Randy Melvin; Linebackers – Robin Ross; Defensive backs – Craig Butler; Special teams coaches: Special teams coordinator – Jeff Reinebold; Special teams assistant – Craig Butler; → Coaching staff |
