= 108th Grey Cup =

2021 Canadian Football League championship game

Winnipeg Blue Bombers	Hamilton Tiger-Cats
(11–3)	(8–6)
33	25
Head coach: Mike O'Shea	Head coach: Orlondo Steinauer
	1	2	3	4	OT	Total
Winnipeg Blue Bombers	4	3	3	15	8	33
Hamilton Tiger-Cats	0	10	9	6	0	25
- Date: December 12, 2021
- Stadium: Tim Hortons Field
- Location: Hamilton
- Most Valuable Player: Zach Collaros, QB (Blue Bombers)
- Most Valuable Canadian: Nic Demski, SB (Blue Bombers)
- Favourite: Blue Bombers by 4
- National anthem: Savannah Ré
- Coin toss: Randy Ambrosie
- Referee: André Proulx
- Halftime show: Arkells with The Lumineers and K.Flay
- Attendance: 26,324

Broadcasters
- Network: English: TSN; French: RDS; United States: ESPN2; UK/Ireland: BT Sport
- Announcers: Rod Smith (play-by-play); Glen Suitor (analyst); Sara Orlesky (sideline reporter); Matthew Scianitti (sideline reporter)

The 108th Grey Cup decided the Canadian Football League (CFL) championship for the 2021 season. Due to the COVID-19 pandemic, the 2020 season was cancelled and the start of the 2021 season was delayed, pushing the game to December 12, 2021. The 108th Grey Cup was a rematch of the 107th Grey Cup in 2019 between the defending Grey Cup and West Division champion Winnipeg Blue Bombers and the East Division champion Hamilton Tiger-Cats, at Tim Hortons Field in Hamilton, Ontario. The Blue Bombers defeated the Tiger-Cats 33–25 in overtime for their second straight title, making them the first team in 11 years to win two straight Grey Cups. This game was also the fourth Grey Cup to go into overtime, with the other three instances coming in 1961, 2005 and 2016.

== Date ==
In 2018, it was speculated that the date for the 108th Grey Cup could come at least one week sooner than in previous years. The Grey Cup had been played on the fourth or fifth Sunday of November since 2007. During the CFL's State of the League address on November 24, 2017, League Commissioner Randy Ambrosie suggested that the league could potentially move the date to the third week of October. On November 23, 2018, Commissioner Ambrosie confirmed that the league schedule would start one week earlier, suggesting that the 108th Grey Cup game would be on November 15, 2020. However, in 2019, when the league announced details of both the 2020 and 2021 seasons, it was revealed that the earlier start meant that it would be played on the third Sunday of November, which was still the earliest start since the November 19 game in 2006.

The COVID-19 pandemic then forced the cancellation of the 2020 season and delayed the start of the 2021 season, pushing the 108th Grey Cup from November 21 to December 12. This was the first time that the Grey Cup game was played in December since the 1972 Grey Cup (also in Hamilton) and it was the latest that a Grey Cup game has ever been played by a day (the previous latest in a calendar year was on December 11, 1937).

== Host city ==
This was the 11th time that the city of Hamilton hosted the Grey Cup, with the previous coming in 1996, and the first to be played at the new Tim Hortons Field. The game was announced as a sell-out on December 5, shortly after the Tiger-Cats won the East Final.

=== Selection process ===
The 108th (2020) and 109th (2021) Grey Cup were awarded to Regina, Saskatchewan, and Hamilton, Ontario, respectively on February 21, 2019. Litigation over the construction of Tim Hortons Field was settled on May 31, 2018, which had prevented the Tiger-Cats from bidding on a Grey Cup game prior to then.

The game was originally awarded as the 109th Grey Cup; (Note: In accordance with longstanding tradition, only Grey Cup games which are actually played are numbered – for years which there was no Grey Cup the affected number is not "skipped" but simply carried over to the next year in which there is a Grey Cup game. Prior to 2020 the only years since 1909 when there was no Grey Cup were during and immediately after the First World War.) the 2020 CFL season was cancelled due to the COVID-19 pandemic in Canada, marking the first time the Grey Cup was not awarded since 1919. As a result, Regina's hosting of the Grey Cup was deferred to 2022.

=== Capacity ===
Under Ontario public health orders, Tim Hortons Field could operate at full capacity, but all attendees aged 12 and over were required to present proof of vaccination for COVID-19. In addition, on October 14 it was announced that due to restrictions on indoor, non-seated events in effect at the time (these restrictions, however, were lifted on October 28), there would be no public entertainment festivities prior to the Grey Cup. Hamilton was therefore awarded the 110th Grey Cup in 2023 as compensation, allowing Hamilton to host the game and its associated festivities as originally planned.

== Background ==
This game was a rematch of the 2019 Grey Cup, and was the first rematch Grey Cup game since 2010. This was also the first game since 2013 where a team played a Grey Cup in its home stadium. The Tiger-Cats entered the game with the league's longest active Grey Cup championship drought, having last won in 1999, after Winnipeg ended their own 29-year drought following the previous season's victory.

=== Hamilton Tiger-Cats ===
The Tiger-Cats finished in second place in the East Division with a regular season record of 8–6 after beginning the season with two losses. The team entered the season with two capable starting quarterbacks, with head coach Orlondo Steinauer choosing the more experienced Jeremiah Masoli as the team's opening day starter. After suffering a rib injury in the second game, Masoli was replaced with Dane Evans, who went 2–1 as a starter before being injured himself and being replaced with third-string quarterback, David Watford. Watford was 2–0 as a starter when Masoli became healthy enough to play and started the remaining seven games of the season, finishing with a 4–5 record as the team's starter.

Masoli took every snap in the team's East Semi-Final win over the Montreal Alouettes, but struggled in the East Final against the Toronto Argonauts. He completed four of six passes for 22 yards before being replaced by Evans early in the second quarter. Evans was a perfect 16-for-16 passing for 249 yards and a touchdown, ran six times for 14 yards and two touchdowns, and had a forced fumble and recovery following an Argonauts' fumble return into Tiger-Cats territory. Evans was soon after named the starting quarterback for the Grey Cup, which was his second consecutive start in the championship game.

=== Winnipeg Blue Bombers ===
The Blue Bombers finished a dominant season with the best record in the CFL at 11–3 with two of their losses occurring after already clinching first place in the West Division. The team won their first division title since 2011, and first West Division first-place finish since 1972, after they defeated the BC Lions on October 23. The Blue Bombers then had 42 days until their next meaningful game with a West Final matchup, their third consecutive appearance in the Division Final, against the Saskatchewan Roughriders which was won 21–17. The team was undefeated at IG Field, winning all seven regular season games and one playoff game there.

The Blue Bombers defence in 2021 was among the best in CFL history, with just 13.4 points allowed per game, which was their lowest total allowed since 1958 when they had 11.4 points against per game. The team also allowed just six total points scored in the fourth quarter in the first twelve games of the season. The team's quarterback, Zach Collaros, started 13 games and was named the West Division's Most Outstanding Player after finishing the season with a 111.01 quarterback passer rating, which was the tenth best of all time. The team had 15 Divisional All-Stars, the most in the league, with seven on offence, seven on defence, and one on special teams. Despite perennial All-Star running back Andrew Harris missing half of the regular season due to injury, the Blue Bombers finished second in rushing offence in the league, led behind the team's four Division All-Stars on the offensive line. With their appearance in this year's Grey Cup, the Blue Bombers surpassed Edmonton for the most Grey Cup appearances of all time with 26.

=== Head-to-head ===
Due to the reduced 14 game schedule, Winnipeg and Hamilton met just once during the 2021 regular season, this being the traditional Grey Cup rematch in Week 1. The Blue Bombers allowed a touchdown on Hamilton's opening drive, but shut out the Tiger-Cats for the rest of the game and won 19–6 at IG Field.

This was the tenth meeting between the two teams in the championship game, and second consecutive, but just the third time since 1965. The Blue Bombers and Tiger-Cats played each other seven times between 1953 and 1965 in the Grey Cup game. The Blue Bombers entered the game with a 7–3 record in Grey Cups against the Tiger-Cats and had also won their first Grey Cup championship over the Tiger-Cats' predecessor, the Hamilton Tigers, in 1935. With the Blue Bombers spending 22 years in the same division as the Tiger-Cats, the two teams had met seven times in the East Division playoffs with Winnipeg winning six of these match ups.

=== Uniforms ===
As the East Division representative in a Grey Cup held in an East Division city (and in their own stadium), the Hamilton Tiger-Cats were the designated home team for the game and elected to use their own dressing room. The team wore their black jerseys with gold pants while the Blue Bombers wore their white jerseys with their gold pants.

== Game summary ==
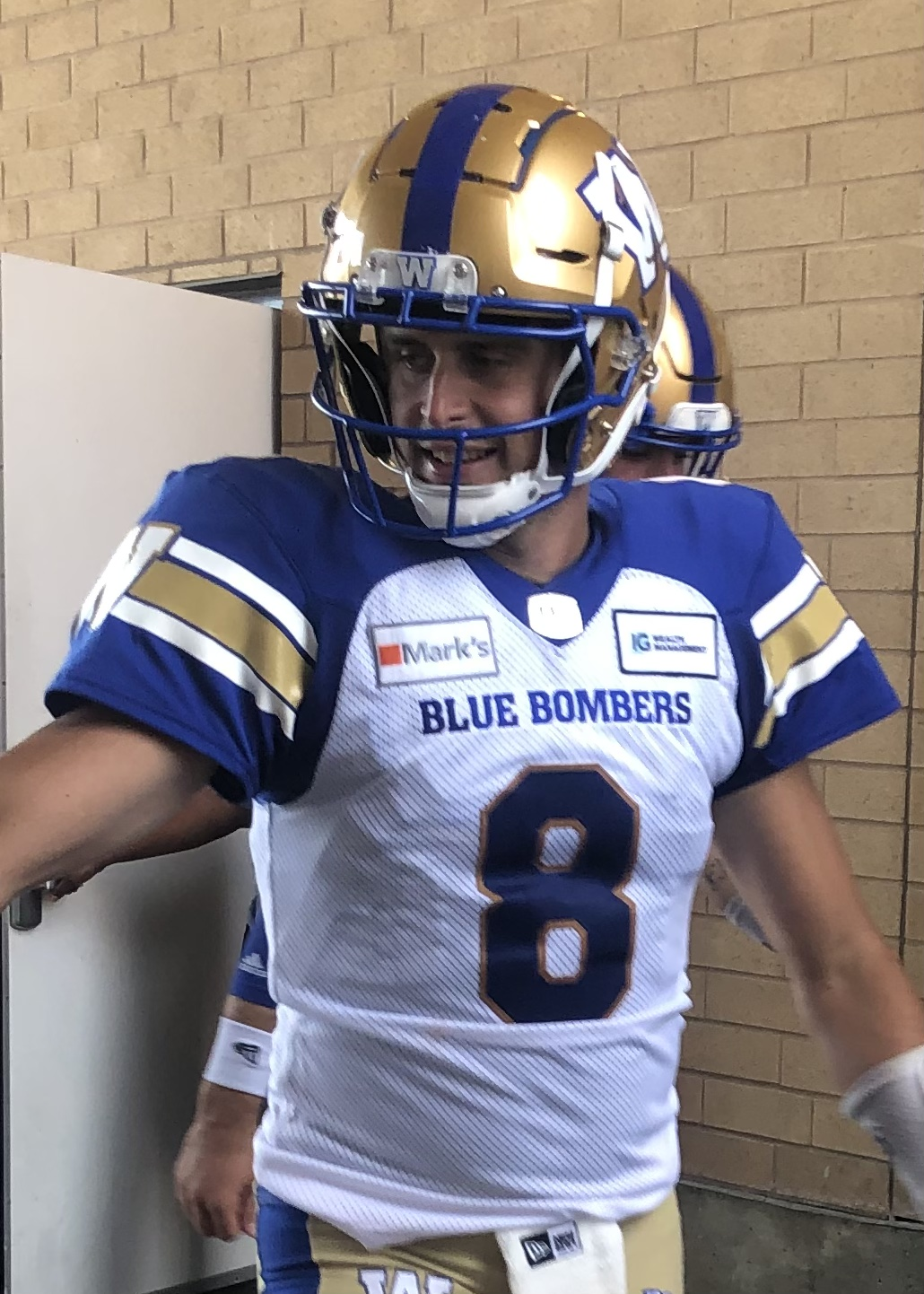
Zach Collaros was the game's MVP.

The game was played in windy conditions, with gusts of nearly 50 km/h. Winnipeg won the coin toss, but elected to defer, choosing to play with the wind at their backs in the first and the fourth quarters. Winnipeg used the wind to their advantage in the first quarter, with two field goals and a single, while Hamilton was limited to seven net offensive yards, the lowest scoring opening quarter of a Grey Cup since 2008. Hamilton replied in the second quarter with a field goal and a twelve-yard touchdown just before halftime, giving them a 10–7 lead.

In the third quarter, Winnipeg managed to kick a 15-yard field goal into the wind to tie the game. Hamilton then went for it on third down and was stopped, forcing a turnover on downs, but their aggression was rewarded with a 43-yard interception by Hamilton defensive back Kameron Kelly. Hamilton quarterback Jeremiah Masoli threw an 11-yard touchdown on that same drive to make the score 17–10. Winnipeg conceded a safety near the end of the quarter to fall behind 19–10, and early in the fourth quarter Hamilton kicked a 10-yard field goal to go up 22–10. As Winnipeg receiver Rasheed Bailey stated after the game, "The wind was tough. It was tough, in the third quarter, we couldn't get anything going because of the wind."

When Winnipeg got the wind back in the fourth quarter, the game began to turn around. Winnipeg kicker Sergio Castillo kicked a 20-yard field goal, and then Winnipeg quarterback Zach Collaros threw a 29-yard touchdown, followed by a kickoff single by Castillo to close the gap to 22–21. With 1:52 left in the game, Castillo kicked his fifth field goal of the game, from 45 yards away, to give Winnipeg a 24–22 lead. He kicked a single on the following kickoff to make it a 25–22 lead. Hamilton responded by driving all the way down the field, nearly scoring a touchdown before settling for a 13-yard field goal with four seconds left in the game.

In overtime, Winnipeg drove down the field and Collaros threw a 13-yard touchdown, and made the two-point conversion to make it 33–25. Then, on Hamilton's ensuing possession, Winnipeg linebacker Kyrie Wilson intercepted a deflected pass from Masoli, ending the game. Winnipeg quarterback Zach Collaros was named the most valuable player, while Winnipeg receiver Nic Demski was named the top Canadian. Winnipeg became the first team to win back-to-back Grey Cups since the Montreal Alouettes in 2009–2010 (and the first West Division team to do so since the Edmonton Eskimos won five straight from 1978 to 1982), and Winnipeg won back-to-back Grey Cups for the first time since 1961–62. Hamilton extended the longest active Grey Cup drought in the CFL to 22 years.

=== Scoring summary ===
First quarter

WPG – FG Castillo 38 yards (8:29) 3–0 WPG
WPG – Single Liegghio 70 yards (2:46) 4–0 WPG

Second quarter

WPG – FG Castillo 34 yards (13:22) 7–0 WPG
HAM – FG Domagala 13 yards (2:41) 7–3 WPG
HAM – TD Dunbar 12-yard reception from Masoli (Domagala convert) (0:21) 10–7 HAM

Third quarter

WPG – FG Castillo 15 yards (8:34) 10–10
HAM – TD Banks 11-yard reception from Masoli (Domagala convert) (4:10) 17–10 HAM
HAM – Safety conceded by Liegghio (0:51) 19–10 HAM

Fourth quarter

HAM – FG Domagala 10 yards (12:03) 22–10 HAM
WPG – FG Castillo 20 yards (8:42) 22–13 HAM
WPG – TD Demski 29-yard reception from Collaros (Castillo convert) (6:09) 22–20 HAM
WPG – Single Castillo 79 yards (5:33) 22–21 HAM
WPG – FG Castillo 45 yards (2:05) 24–22 WPG
WPG – Single Castillo 76 yards (1:52) 25–22 WPG
HAM – FG Domagala 13 yards (0:06) 25–25

Overtime

WPG – TD Adams 13-yard reception from Collaros (Bailey convert, pass from Collaros) 33–25 WPG

=== Individual statistics ===
Sources: CFL 108th Grey Cup Boxscore

Tiger-Cats passing
Player	CP/AT	Pct	Yards	TD	Int
(United States) Jeremiah Masoli	20/25	80.0%	185	2	1
(United States) Dane Evans	4/9	44.4%	24	0	1
Tiger-Cats rushing
Player	Car	Yards	Avg	Lg	TD
(United States) Don Jackson	11	59	5.4	21	0
(United States) Jeremiah Masoli	6	35	5.8	12	0
(United States) Brandon Banks	2	7	3.5	7	0
(United States) Tim White	1	4	4.0	4	0
(United States) Jaelon Acklin	1	1	1.0	1	0
Tiger-Cats receiving
Player	Rec	Yards	Avg	Lg	TD
(United States) Steven Dunbar	6	63	10.5	19	1
(United States) Don Jackson	6	48	8.0	36	0
(United States) Jaelon Acklin	4	33	8.2	13	0
(United States) Tim White	4	33	8.2	20	0
(United States) Brandon Banks	4	32	8.0	13	1
Tiger-Cats defence
Player	DT–ST	QS	Int	FR	FF
(United States) Jovan Santos-Knox	8–0	0	0	0	0
(United States) Simoni Lawrence	6–0	0	0	0	0
(Canada) Stavros Katsantonis	5–0	0	0	0	0
(United States) Ciante Evans	4–0	0	0	0	0
(United States) Cariel Brooks	3–0	0	0	0	0
(United States) Julian Howsare	3–0	0	0	0	0
(United States) Dylan Wynn	2–0	0	0	0	0
(United States) Jumal Rolle	2–0	0	0	0	0
(Canada) Tunde Adeleke	2–0	0	0	0	0
(United States) Kameron Kelly	2–0	0	2	0	0
(United States) Malik Carney	1–0	0	0	0	0
(United States) Jaelon Acklin	1–0	0	0	0	0
(United States) Brandon Banks	1–0	0	0	0	0
(United States) Ja'Gared Davis	1–0	1	0	0	0
(United States) Chris Frey	0–3	0	0	0	0
(Canada) Bailey Feltmate	0–3	0	0	0	0
(Canada) Nic Cross	0–2	0	0	0	1
(Canada) Felix Garand-Gauthier	0–1	0	0	1	0
(Canada) Mike Daly	0–1	0	0	0	0
Tiger-Cats placekicking
Player	FM–FA	Lng	Avg	Sng	CM-CA
(Canada) Michael Domagala	3–3	13	12.0	0	2–2
Tiger-Cats punting
Player	No	GAv	NAv	Sng	Lng
(Australia) Joel Whitford	10	35.7	29.9	0	57

Blue Bombers passing
Player	CP/AT	Pct	Yards	TD	Int
(United States) Zach Collaros	21/32	65.6%	240	2	2
Blue Bombers rushing
Player	Car	Yards	Avg	Lg	TD
(Canada) Andrew Harris	18	80	4.4	14	0
(Canada) Nic Demski	2	−1	−0.5	0	0
Blue Bombers receiving
Player	Rec	Yards	Avg	Lg	TD
(United States) Darvin Adams	5	61	12.2	21	1
(United States) Rasheed Bailey	3	60	20.0	34	0
(Canada) Drew Wolitarsky	4	48	12.0	19	0
(United States) Kenny Lawler	3	41	13.7	19	0
(Canada) Nic Demski	4	27	6.8	29	1
(Canada) Andrew Harris	2	3	1.5	3	0
Blue Bombers defence
Player	DT–ST	QS	Int	FR	FF
(United States) Alden Darby	6–0	0	1	0	0
(United States) Adam Bighill	5–0	0	0	0	0
(United States) Kyrie Wilson	5–0	0	1	0	0
(United States) Deatrick Nichols	4–0	0	0	0	0
(United States) Nick Taylor	4–0	0	0	0	0
(Canada) Jake Thomas	4–0	1	0	0	0
(United States) Winston Rose	4–0	0	0	0	0
(United States) Steven Richardson	4–0	2	0	0	0
(United States) DeAundre Alford	3–0	0	0	0	0
(United States) Willie Jefferson	3–0	0	0	0	0
(United States) Brandon Alexander	2–0	0	0	0	0
(United States) Kenny Lawler	1–0	0	0	0	0
(Canada) Michael Couture	1–0	0	0	0	0
(Canada) Tanner Cadwallader	0–3	0	0	0	0
(Canada) Mike Miller	0–1	0	0	0	0
(Canada) Jesse Briggs	0–1	0	0	0	0
(Canada) Nick Hallett	0–1	0	0	0	0
(Canada) Johnny Augustine	0–1	0	0	0	0
Blue Bombers placekicking
Player	FM–FA	Lng	Avg	Sng	CM-CA
(United States) Sergio Castillo	5–5	45	30.4	0	1–1
Blue Bombers punting
Player	No	GAv	NAv	Sng	Lng
(Canada) Marc Liegghio	5	38.6	29.8	1	70

== Depth charts ==
The following diagrams illustrate the teams' depth charts that were released one day prior to game day. Starters are listed in boxes in their respective positions with backups listed directly above or below. As per CFL rules, 45 of the 46 players for each team dressed in the game, with Hamilton's Travis Vornkahl and Winnipeg's Ricky Walker being the teams' game day scratches.

=== Hamilton Tiger-Cats ===
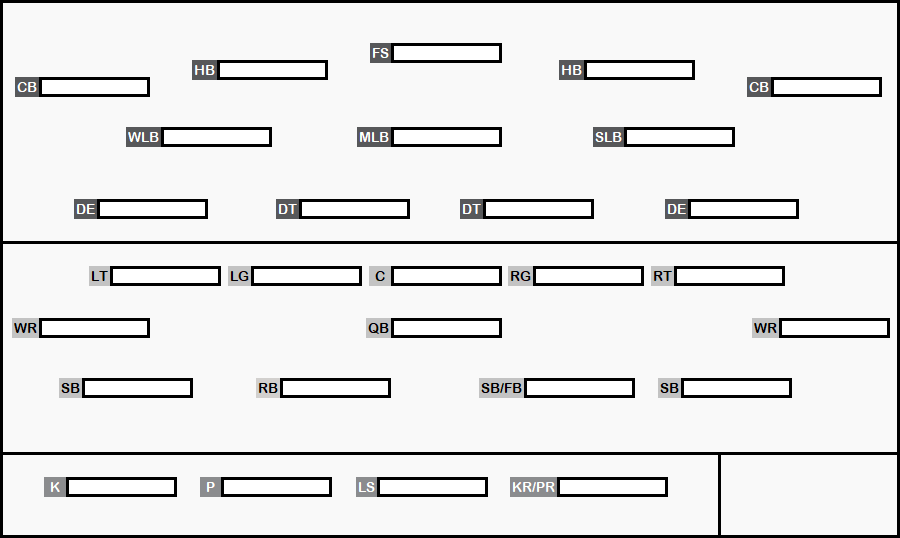

=== Winnipeg Blue Bombers ===
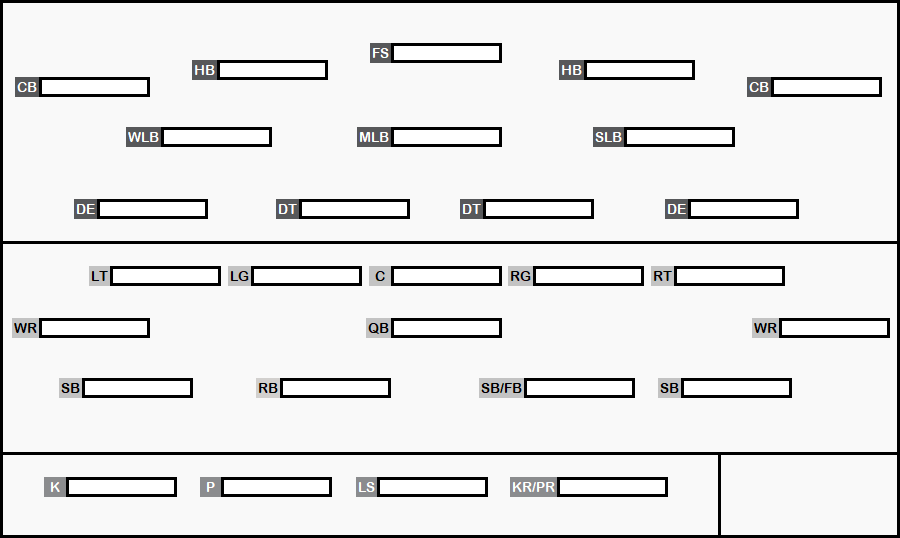

== Broadcasting ==
The game was televised in Canada by TSN (English) and RDS (French), in the United States on ESPN2, in the United Kingdom by BT Sport, and in Mexico by MVS. Outside of North America, the Grey Cup was carried by ESPN International and its affiliated networks to 74 countries.

The game was also available for online streaming for international viewers (outside of Canada, the United States, and the United Kingdom) through the CFL's streaming platform.

== Officials ==
The highest rated officials during the 2021 CFL season from their respective positions were selected for the game and announced on December 9. The numbers below indicate their uniform numbers.

- Referee: No. 28 André Proulx
- Umpire: No. 61 Patrick MacArthur
- Down Judge: No. 36 Tom Cesari
- Line Judge: No. 27 Andrew Wakefield
- Side Judge: No. 44 Blair Brown
- Back Judge: No. 46 Rob Skaggs
- Field Judge: No. 37 Jason Maggio
- Backup Referee: No. 74 Tim Kroeker
- Backup Umpire: No. 73 Brian Chrupalo
- Backup Official: No. 68 Rob Hand
- Backup Official: No. 63 Rob Hill
