= Lee Autry =

American football player (born 1996)

No. 99 – Vegas Knight Hawks
- Position: Defensive lineman
- Roster status: Active

Personal information
- Born: July 29, 1996 (age 30); Albemarle, North Carolina, U.S.
- Listed height: 6 ft 2 in (1.88 m)
- Listed weight: 305 lb (138 kg)

Career information
- College: Mississippi State; Itawamba

Career history
- 2020: Chicago Bears*
- 2020: Los Angeles Chargers*
- 2020: Las Vegas Raiders*
- 2021–2022: Hamilton Tiger-Cats
- 2024–present: Vegas Knight Hawks
- * Offseason or practice squad member only
- Stats at Pro Football Reference
- Stats at CFL.ca

Lee Thomas Autry II (born July 29, 1996) is an American professional football defensive lineman for the Vegas Knight Hawks of the Indoor Football League (IFL). He was previously a member of the Hamilton Tiger-Cats of the Canadian Football League (CFL). Autry has also had stints with the Chicago Bears, Los Angeles Chargers, and Las Vegas Raiders, all in the National Football League (NFL).

== College career ==
Autry first played college football for the Itawamba Community College Indians from 2015 to 2016. He then transferred to play for the Mississippi State Bulldogs where he had a redshirt season in 2017 and then played from 2018 to 2019. With the Bulldogs, he appeared in 18 games where he had 23 total tackles, 2.5 tackles for a loss, and 0.5 sacks.

== Professional career ==
=== Chicago Bears ===
After going unselected in the 2020 NFL draft, Autry signed with the Chicago Bears on May 8, 2020. However, he was released soon after the season started on September 8, 2020.

=== Los Angeles Chargers ===
On October 8, 2020, Autry signed a practice roster agreement with the Los Angeles Chargers. He was later released on October 28, 2020.

=== Las Vegas Raiders ===
Autry was signed by the Las Vegas Raiders to their practice squad on December 10, 2020, but was released four days later on December 14, 2020.

=== Hamilton Tiger-Cats ===
Autry was signed by the Hamilton Tiger-Cats on June 28, 2021. He began the 2021 season on the practice roster but was promoted to the team's active roster in Week 2 and made his professional debut on August 14, 2021, against the Saskatchewan Roughriders. Autry played in four regular season games for the Tiger-Cats in 2021 and also played in the East Semi-Final and 108th Grey Cup. Autry has spent most of the 2022 season on the Ticats’ practice roster, dressing for two games, recording two tackles. Autry was released by the Ti-Cats on October 6, 2022, near the end of the regular season.

=== Vegas Knight Hawks ===
Autry is a defensive lineman for the Knight Hawks in the Arena Football League (AFL). He re-signed with the team for the 2025 season on November 4, 2024.

During the 2024 season, Autry played 17 games, recording 20.5 tackles, 2.5 sacks, and two pass breakups. His key contributions in the defensive line were crucial in slowing down opposing offenses, especially against strong rushing attacks. Autry's season highs included 4 tackles and 1 sack, both on July 27, 2024.

2024 Season Statistics • Games Played: 17 • Solo Tackles: 16 • Assisted Tackles: 11 • Tackles High: 4 (7/27/2024) • Sacks High: 1 (7/27/2024)

Autry remains a key defensive presence for the Knight Hawks heading into the 2025 season.

== Personal life ==
Autry was born in Albemarle, North Carolina to parents Lasonya and Lee Autry. His brother, Denico Autry, also plays gridiron football professionally as a defensive lineman and is a member of the Tennessee Titans.
