= Jake Burt =

Canadian gridiron football player (born 1996)

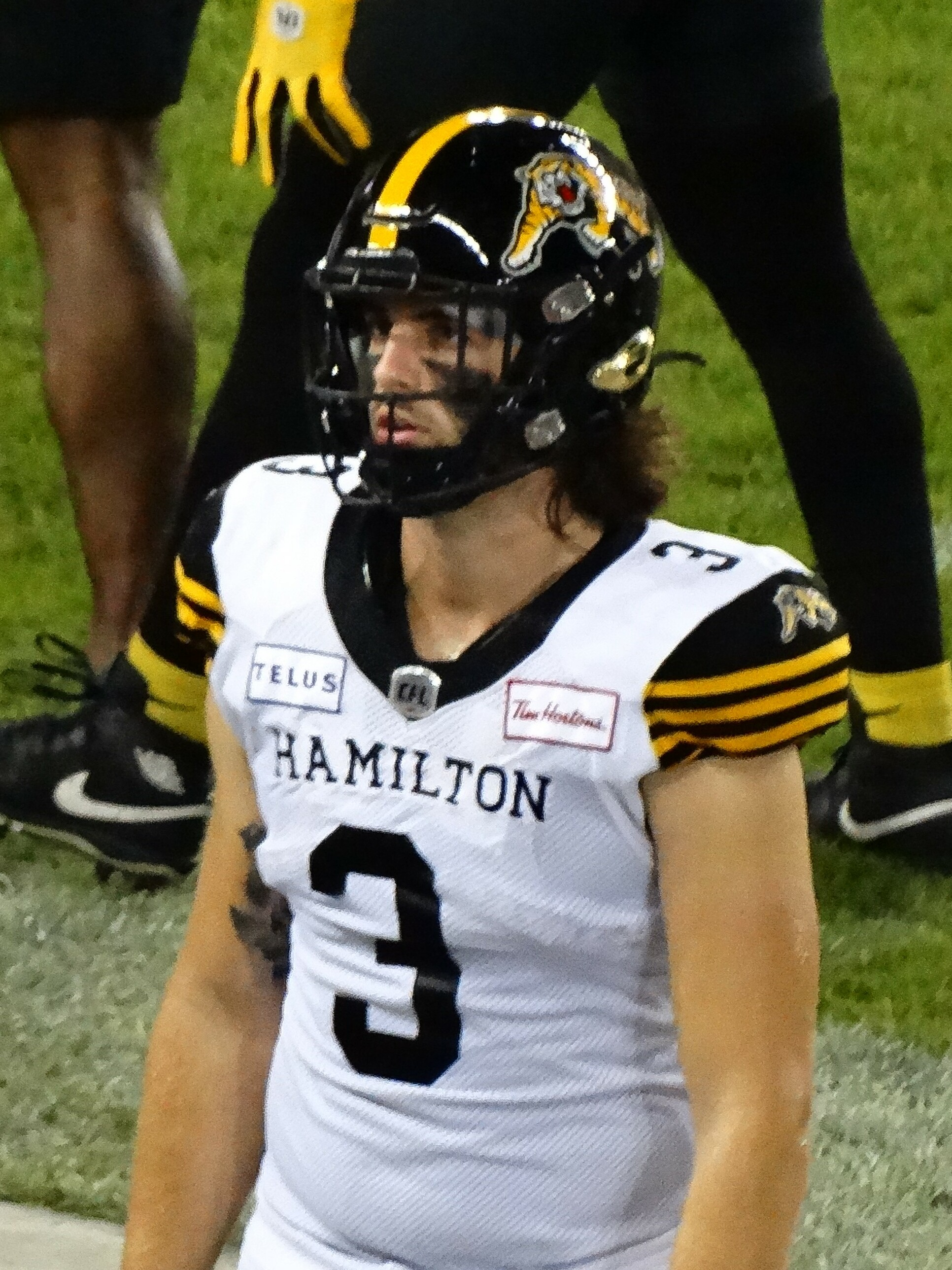
- Burt with the Hamilton Tiger-Cats in 2022

Profile
- Position: Tight end

Personal information
- Born: August 25, 1996 (age 30); Regina, Saskatchewan, Canada
- Listed height: 6 ft 3 in (1.91 m)
- Listed weight: 230 lb (104 kg)

Career information
- High school: St. John's Preparatory
- College: Boston College
- CFL draft: 2021: 1st round, 1st overall pick

Career history
- 2020: New England Patriots*
- 2021–2022: Hamilton Tiger-Cats
- * Offseason or practice squad member only
- Stats at Pro Football Reference
- Stats at CFL.ca

Jakeb Nolan Burt (born August 25, 1996) is a Canadian former professional football tight end. He was drafted first overall in the 2021 CFL draft by the Hamilton Tiger-Cats. He played college football for the Boston College Eagles from 2015 to 2019.

== Professional career ==
=== New England Patriots ===
Burt was not selected in the 2020 NFL draft, but he signed as an undrafted free agent with the New England Patriots of the National Football League to a three-year contract. He spent the entire season on the practice squad and was not re-signed for the following year.

=== Hamilton Tiger-Cats ===
Burt was a late addition to be qualified for the CFL draft in 2021 after he provided documentation proving his National status. His draft value rapidly rose to the point that he was selected with the first overall pick in the 2021 CFL draft by the Hamilton Tiger-Cats. He signed his rookie contract on the same day of the draft which was registered with the league on May 5, 2021. However, he spent the entire 2021 season on the injured list.

Burt made his professional debut in the season opening game of 2022 on June 11, against the Saskatchewan Roughriders in his city of birth, Regina. In that game, he recorded two receptions for ten yards. On May 10, 2023, Burt was released by the Tiger-Cats.

== Personal life ==
Burt was born in Regina, Saskatchewan, to parents Scott and Dawn Burt. Burt and his family moved to Lynnfield, Massachusetts, when he was four years old and he grew up in the Boston area.
