= Travis Vornkahl =

American football player (born 1995)

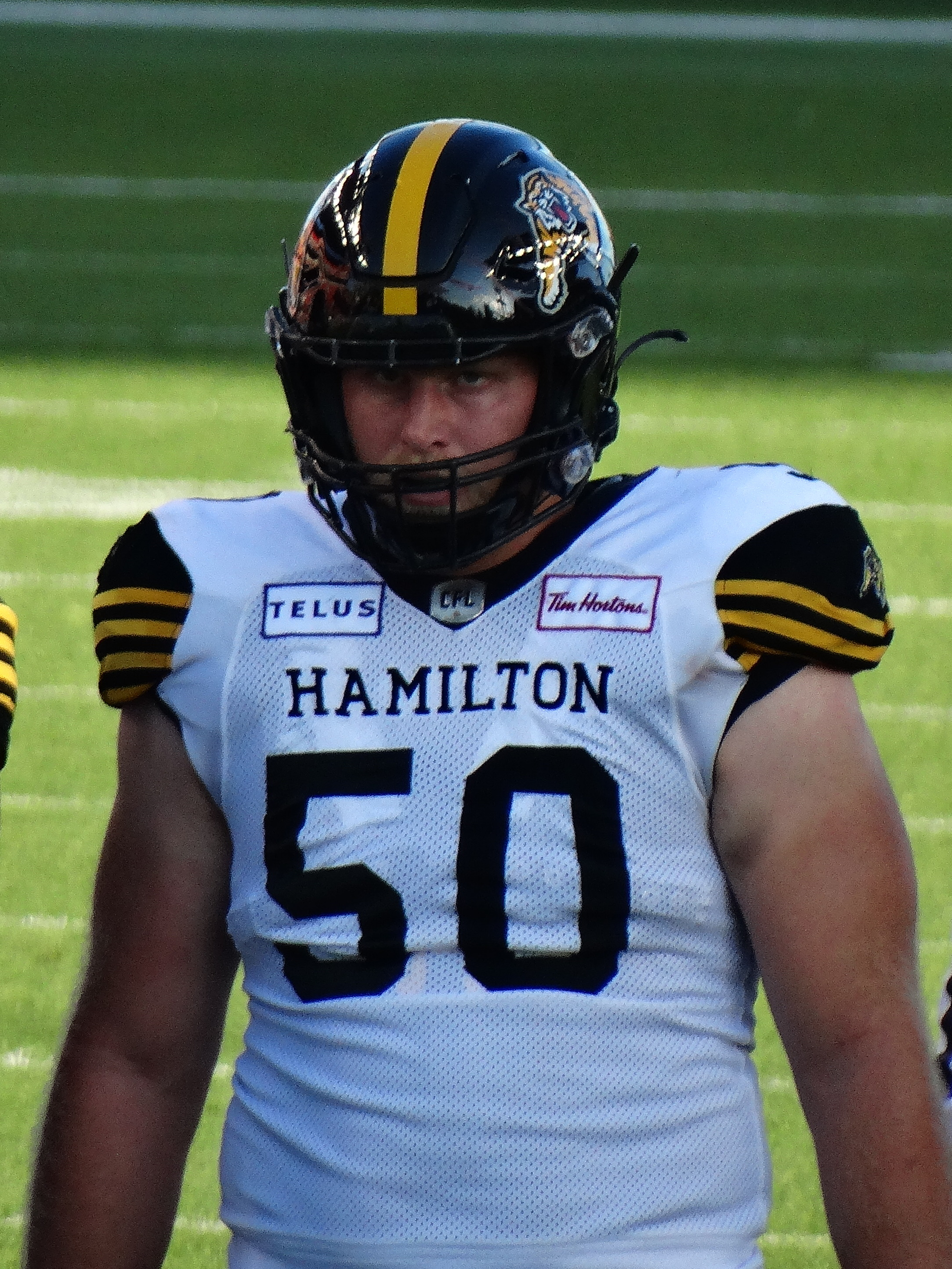
- Vornkahl with the Hamilton Tiger-Cats in 2022

No. 50
- Position: Offensive lineman

Personal information
- Born: November 5, 1995 (age 31); Sealy, Texas
- Listed height: 6 ft 6 in (1.98 m)
- Listed weight: 298 lb (135 kg)

Career information
- High school: Bellville High (TX)
- College: West Texas A&M
- NFL draft: 2019: undrafted

Career history
- Saskatchewan Roughriders (2019)*; Cleveland Browns (2019)*; Washington Redskins (2019)*; Indianapolis Colts (2019)*; Hamilton Tiger-Cats (2021–2022)
- * Offseason or practice squad member only
- Stats at Pro Football Reference
- Stats at CFL.ca

Travis Vornkahl (born November 5, 1995) is an American former professional football offensive tackle who played for the Hamilton Tiger-Cats of the Canadian Football League (CFL).

== College career ==
After using a redshirt season in 2014, Vornkahl played college football for the West Texas A&M Buffaloes from 2015 to 2018. He played and started in 32 games.

== Professional career ==
=== Saskatchewan Roughriders ===
On May 19, 2019, Vornkahl signed with the Saskatchewan Roughriders after going undrafted in the 2019 NFL draft. He was granted his release on June 8, 2019, in order to pursue opportunities in the National Football League.

=== Cleveland Browns ===
On August 9, 2019, Vornkahl signed with the Cleveland Browns. He was released near the end of training camp on August 31, 2019.

=== Washington Redskins ===
Vornkahl later signed with the Washington Redskins to a practice squad agreement on October 3, 2019. After three weeks, he was released on October 21, 2019.

=== Indianapolis Colts ===
On December 17, 2019, Vornkahl signed a practice roster agreement with the Indianapolis Colts. He re-signed with the team in the following offseason, but was released on August 2, 2020, as the team pared their roster down to 80 players.

=== Hamilton Tiger-Cats ===
On April 27, 2021, Vornkahl signed with the Hamilton Tiger-Cats. He retired on July 3, 2021, but returned to the team on August 23, 2021, and was added to the team's practice roster. Two months later, on October 23, 2021, he made his professional debut against the Ottawa Redblacks as the team's starting left tackle. Vornkahl played and started in three regular season games for the Tiger-Cats as well as the East Semi-Final playoff game against the Montreal Alouettes. He was on the injured list for the East Final and was on the reserve roster for the 108th Grey Cup loss to the Winnipeg Blue Bombers.

Following 2022 training camp, Vornkahl earned a starting role as the team's left tackle. After being demoted to the practice roster for games 5 and 6, he returned to start in the team's week 7 victory over the Alouettes. He played in nine games in 2022, including seven starts, before being released on September 21, 2022.

== Personal life ==
Vornkahl was born to parents Marilyn and Greg Vornkahl and has one sibling.
