= Joel Whitford =

Australian gridiron football punter (born 1993)

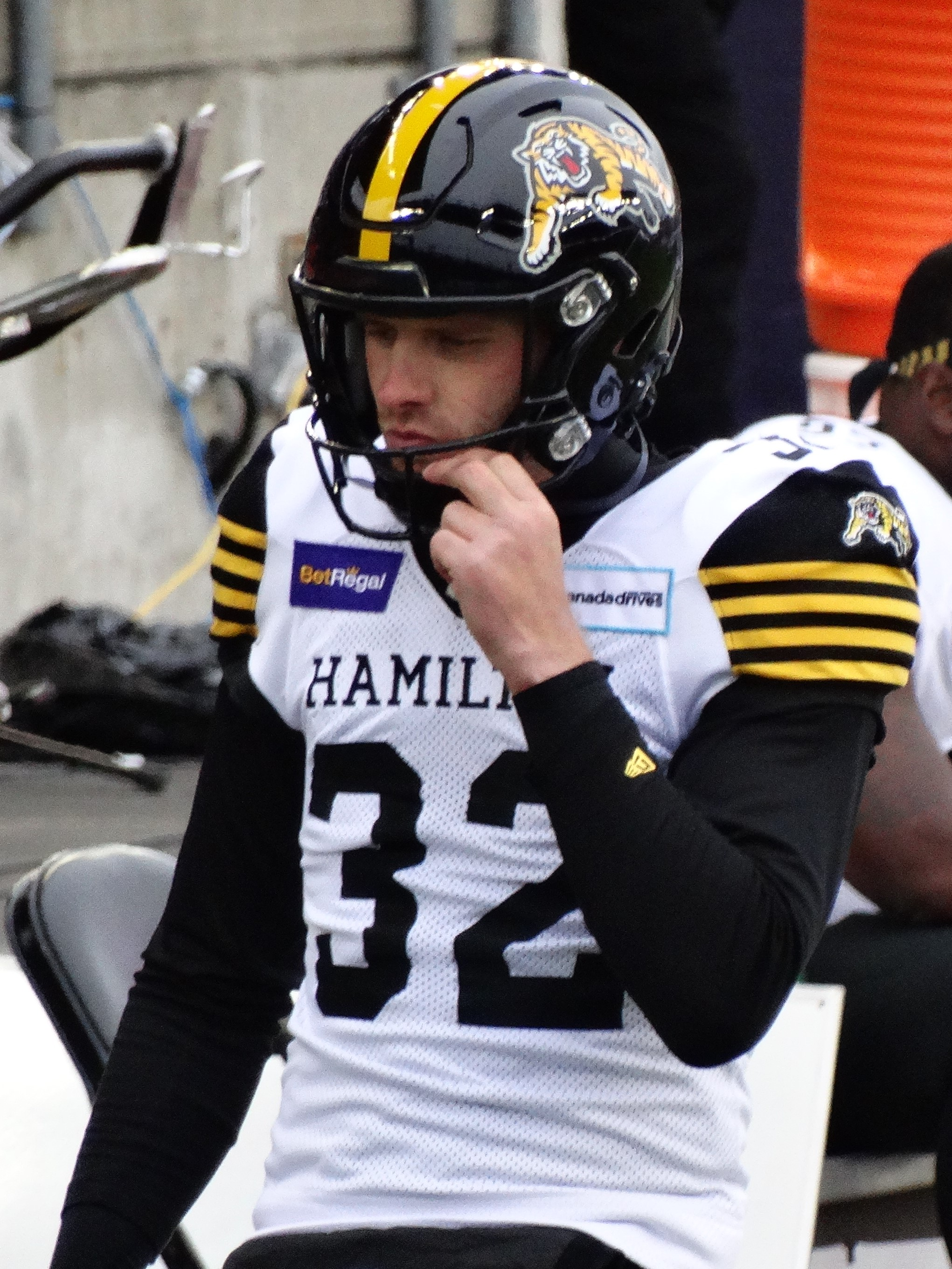
- Whitford with the Hamilton Tiger-Cats in 2021

Profile
- Position: Punter

Personal information
- Born: 1 July 1993 (age 33); Neerim South, Victoria, Australia
- Listed height: 6 ft 3 in (1.91 m)
- Listed weight: 209 lb (95 kg)

Career information
- College: Santa Barbara City; Washington
- CFL draft: 2021G: 1st round, 8th overall pick

Career history
- 2021–2022: Hamilton Tiger-Cats
- 2022: Montreal Alouettes
- Stats at CFL.ca

Joel Whitford (born 1 July 1993) is an Australian former professional Canadian football punter.

== College career ==
Whitford played college football for the Santa Barbara City College Vaqueros in 2015. After sitting out the 2016 season, he joined the Washington Huskies and played for the team from 2017 to 2019.

== Professional career ==
=== Hamilton Tiger-Cats ===
Whitford was drafted in the first round, eighth overall by the Hamilton Tiger-Cats in the 2021 CFL global draft and signed with the team on 28 April 2021. Following 2021 training camp, he won the job as the team's punter and played in his first career professional game on 5 August 2021, against the Winnipeg Blue Bombers. He played in 12 regular-season games and had 68 punts with a 45.1-yard average. He began the 2022 season on the practice roster before being released on June 27, 2022.

=== Montreal Alouettes ===
On July 8, 2022, Whitford signed with the Montreal Alouettes. On November 14, 2022, Whitford was released by the Alouettes.
