= Félix Garand-Gauthier =

Canadian gridiron football player (born 1995)

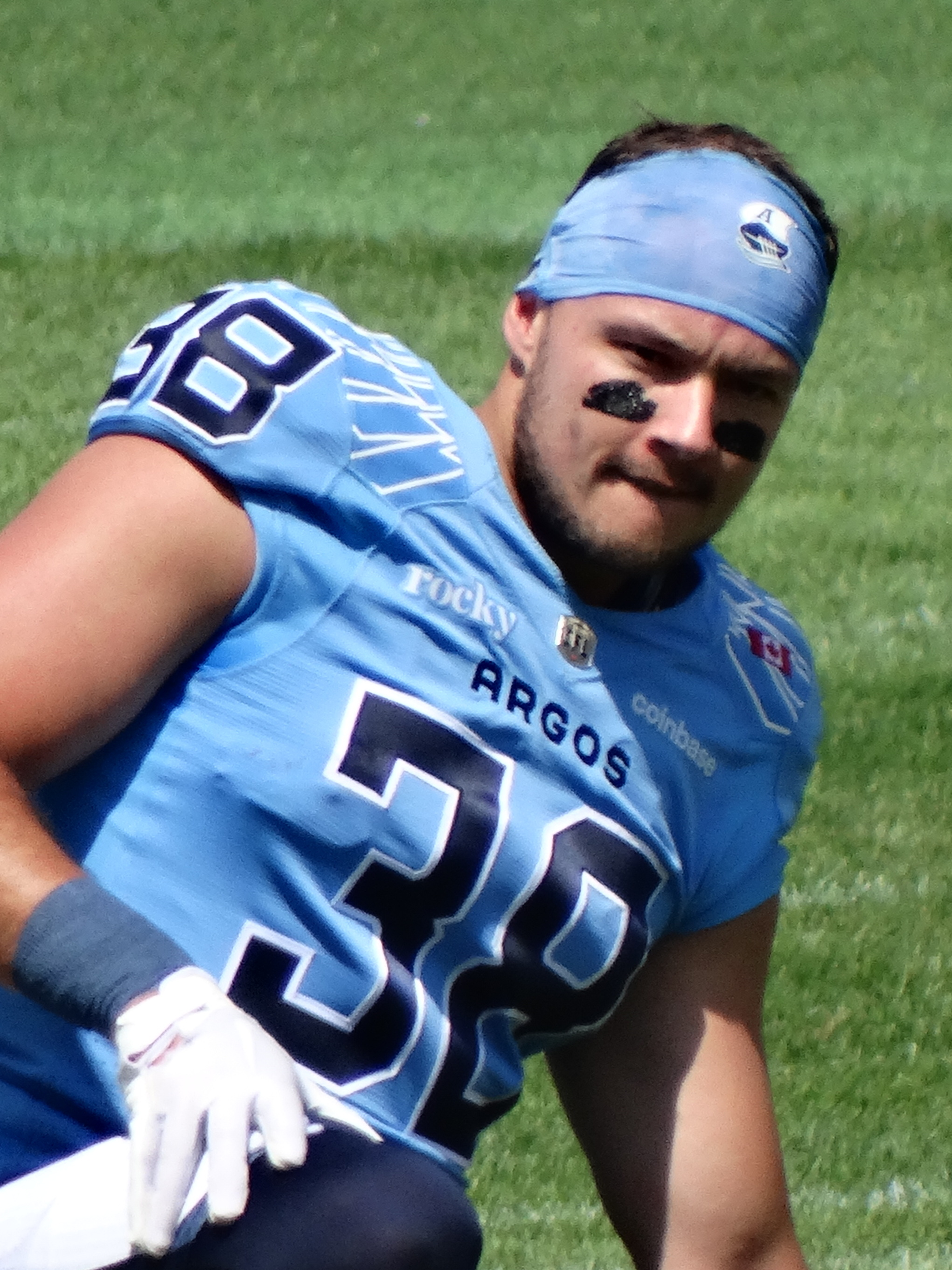
- Garand-Gauthier with the Toronto Argonauts in 2025

Profile
- Position: Fullback

Personal information
- Born: November 2, 1995 (age 31); Mirabel, Quebec, Canada
- Listed height: 6 ft 1 in (1.85 m)
- Listed weight: 225 lb (102 kg)

Career information
- University: Laval
- CFL draft: 2021: 5th round, 37th overall pick

Career history
- 2021–2024: Hamilton Tiger-Cats
- 2025: Toronto Argonauts

Awards and highlights
- Vanier Cup champion (2018); Second-team All-Canadian (2019)

Career CFL statistics as of 2025
- Games played: 69
- Receptions: 20
- Receiving yards: 280
- Touchdowns: 0
- Special teams tackles: 33
- Stats at CFL.ca

Félix Garand-Gauthier (born November 2, 1995) is a Canadian professional football fullback. He most recently played for the Toronto Argonauts of the Canadian Football League (CFL).

== University career ==
Following high school, Garand-Gauthier played as a quarterback for the Lionel-Groulx Nordiques in CEGEP. He then played U Sports football for the Laval Rouge et Or from 2018 to 2019. In 2018, he won a Vanier Cup championship when the Rouge et Or defeated the Western Mustangs in the 54th Vanier Cup game. Over the course of his university career, Garand-Gauthier played in 14 games and recorded 12 receptions for 152 yards and three touchdowns and had 11 carries for 23 rushing yards and three touchdowns. He was named a U Sports Second Team All-Canadian in 2019. He did not play in 2020 due to the cancellation of the 2020 U Sports football season and was draft-eligible for the Canadian Football League in 2021.

== Professional career ==
Pre-draft measurables
Height	Weight	40-yard dash	20-yard shuttle	Three-cone drill	Broad jump	Bench press
6 ft 1 1/2 in (1.87 m)	221.5 lb (100 kg)	5.06 s	4.33 s	6.90 s	9 ft 2 7/8 in (2.82 m)	17 reps
All values from CFL Combine

=== Hamilton Tiger-Cats ===
Garand-Gauthier was drafted in the fifth round, 37th overall, by the Hamilton Tiger-Cats in the 2021 CFL draft and signed with the team on May 21, 2021. He made the team's active roster following training camp in 2021 and played in his first career professional game on August 5, 2021, against the Winnipeg Blue Bombers. He played as a backup fullback where he had his first career rushing attempt on October 10, 2021, against the Toronto Argonauts, that went for one yard on a failed third down conversion. He played in 11 regular season games in 2021 where he had eight special teams tackles. He also played in all three post-season games, including his first Grey Cup game against the Winnipeg Blue Bombers. He recorded one special teams tackle and one fumble recovery in the 108th Grey Cup game, but the Tiger-Cats lost in overtime to the Blue Bombers.

In 2022, Garand-Gauthier played in 17 regular season games where he had a more prominent role in the team's offence where he recorded nine receptions for 190 yards. He also had two defensive tackles and eight defensive tackles. In the 2023 season, he played in all 18 regular season games and had six catches for 54 yards and five special teams tackles. Garand-Gauthier played in 13 regular season games in 2024 where he had one catch for two yards and a career-high ten special teams tackles. He was released shortly before 2025 training camp on May 5, 2025.

=== Toronto Argonauts ===
On July 29, 2025, it was announced that Garand-Gauthier had signed with the Toronto Argonauts. He spent one year with Toronto and became a free agent upon the expiry of his contract on February 10, 2026.
