= Mason Bennett (Canadian football) =

Canadian gridiron football player (born 1997)

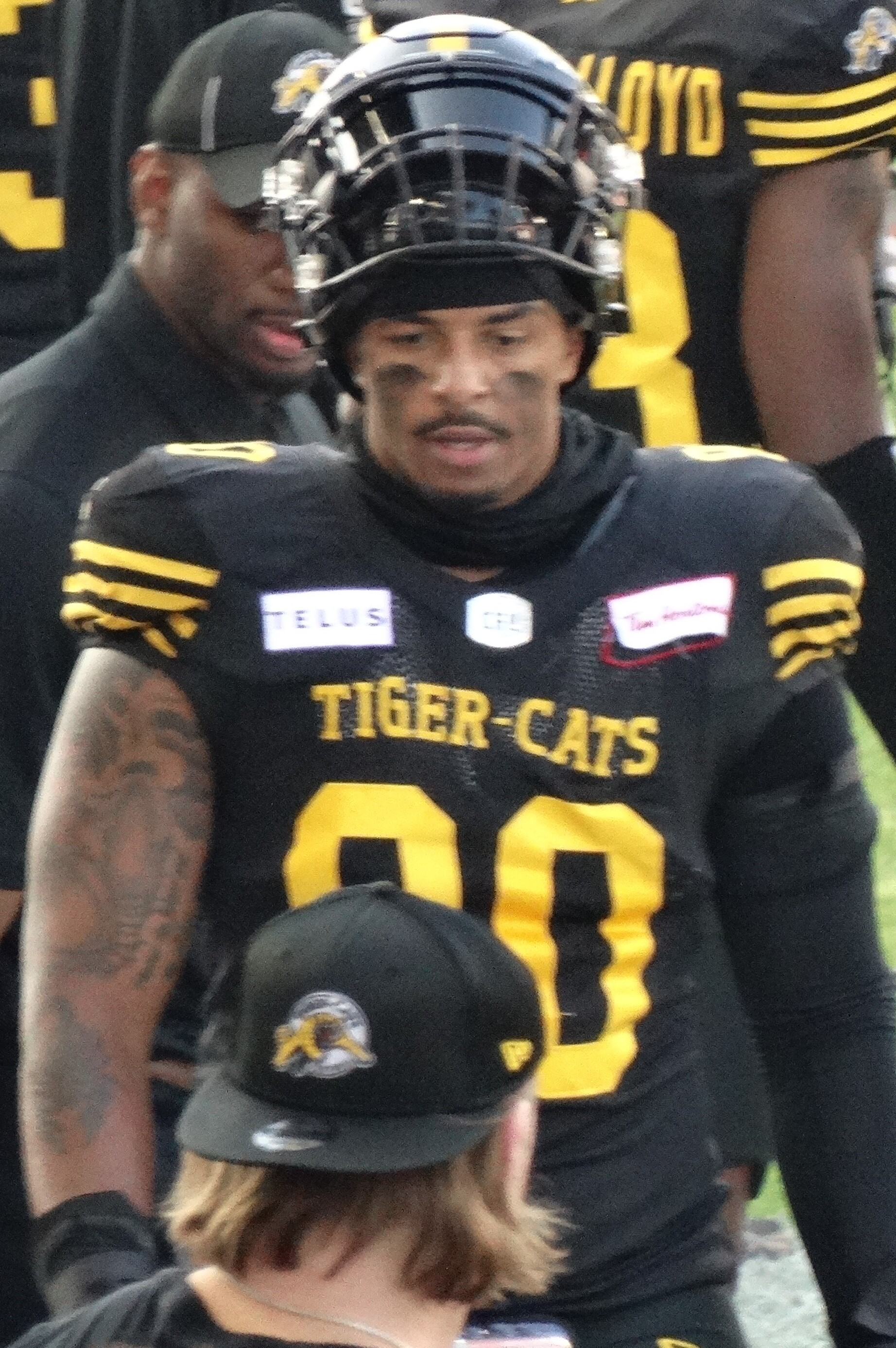
- Bennett with the Hamilton Tiger-Cats in 2023

Profile
- Position: Defensive end

Personal information
- Born: November 12, 1997 (age 28); Winnipeg, Manitoba, Canada
- Listed height: 6 ft 4 in (1.93 m)
- Listed weight: 262 lb (119 kg)

Career information
- High school: Vincent Massey Collegiate (Winnipeg, Manitoba)
- College: North Dakota
- CFL draft: 2020: 1st round, 8th overall pick

Career history
- 2021–2023: Hamilton Tiger-Cats
- Stats at CFL.ca

Mason Bennett (born November 12, 1997) is a Canadian former professional football defensive end. He played for the Hamilton Tiger-Cats of the Canadian Football League (CFL).

== College career ==
Bennett played college football for the North Dakota Fighting Hawks from 2016 to 2019 after using a redshirt season in 2015. In four seasons with North Dakota, he played in 43 games and recorded 128 total tackles, 20 sacks, three pass breakups, one forced fumble, and two fumble recoveries.

== Professional career ==
Bennett was drafted in the first round, eighth overall by the Hamilton Tiger-Cats in the 2020 CFL draft, but did not play in 2020 due to the cancellation of the 2020 CFL season. He then signed with the team on January 21, 2021. Bennett made the team's active roster following training camp in 2021 and played in his first career professional game on August 5, 2021, against the Winnipeg Blue Bombers in his hometown of Winnipeg, where he made his first three defensive tackles. He recorded his first career sack on September 6, 2021, in the Labour Day Classic against the Toronto Argonauts, when he tackled Nick Arbuckle. He played in 12 regular season games where he had 11 defensive tackles, one special teams tackle, and two sacks. Bennett was placed on the injured list for the team's two playoff games in 2021, but was able to make his post-season debut in the 108th Grey Cup game. As a backup defensive lineman in his first Grey Cup, he recorded no statistics as the Tiger-Cats lost to the Winnipeg Blue Bombers by a score of 33 to 25.

Bennett was released on June 2, 2024.

== Personal life ==
Bennett was born in Winnipeg, Manitoba, to parents Tammie Bennett and Tim King.
