= Michael Domagala =

Canadian gridiron football player (born 1995)

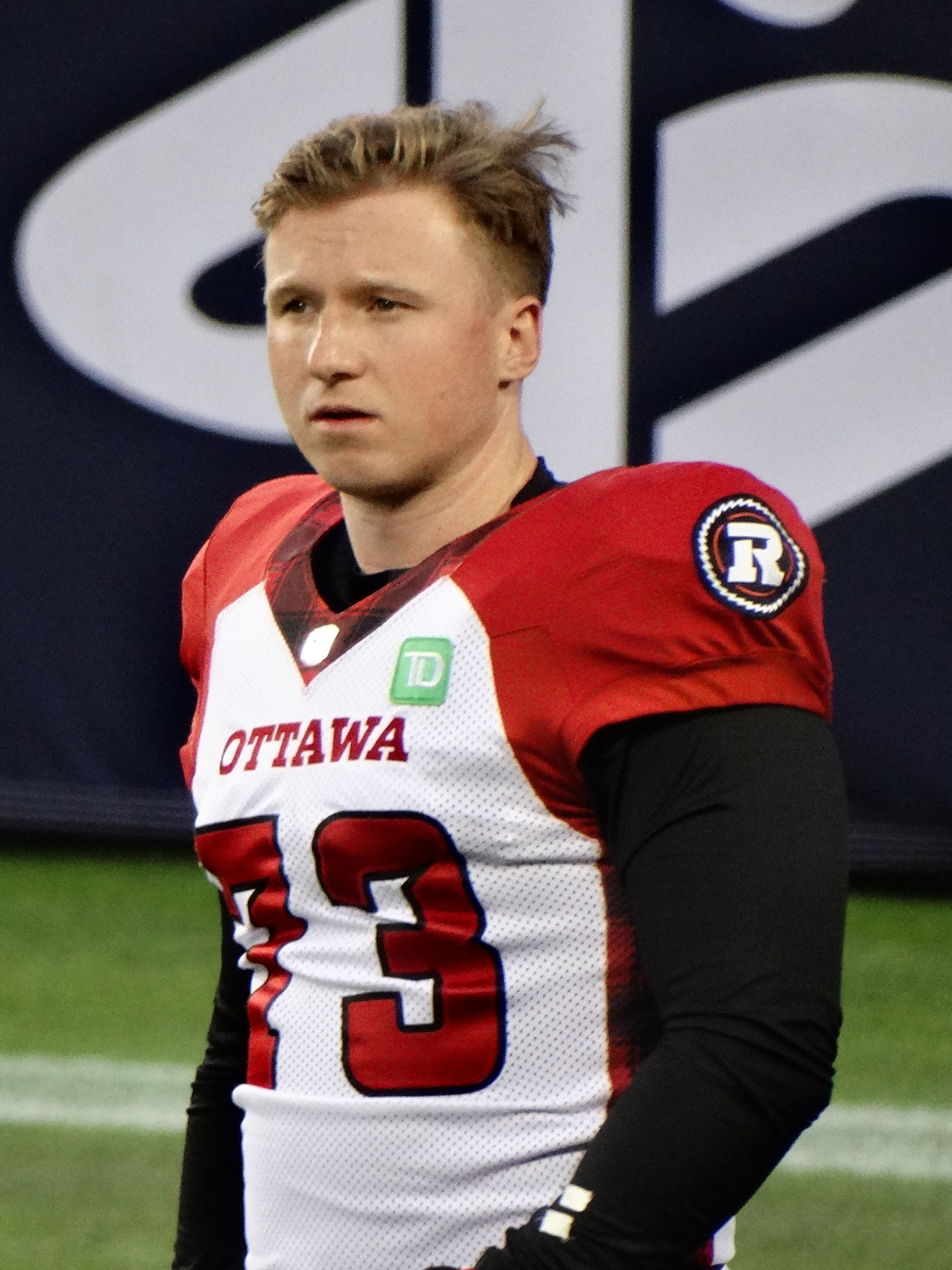
- Domagala with the Ottawa Redblacks in 2023

Profile
- Positions: Placekicker, punter

Personal information
- Born: September 28, 1995 (age 31); St. Catharines, Ontario, Canada
- Listed height: 5 ft 8 in (1.73 m)
- Listed weight: 200 lb (91 kg)

Career information
- University: Carleton
- CFL draft: 2017: undrafted

Career history
- 2019: Hamilton Tiger-Cats*
- 2021–2022: Hamilton Tiger-Cats
- 2023: Edmonton Elks*
- 2023: Ottawa Redblacks
- 2024: Montreal Alouettes*
- 2025: Hamilton Tiger-Cats*
- * Offseason or practice squad member only
- Stats at CFL.ca

Michael Domagala (born September 28, 1995) is a Canadian professional football placekicker. He has played in the Canadian Football League (CFL) for the Hamilton Tiger-Cats and Ottawa Redblacks.

== University career ==
Domagala played U Sports football for Carleton from 2013 to 2018. He played in 42 games for the Ravens where he was successful on 73 of 96 field goal attempts for a 76.0% completion rate and punted 347 times for a 38.8-yard average. Domagala was not selected in the 2017 CFL draft and instead completed his final two seasons of eligibility with Carleton.

== Professional career ==
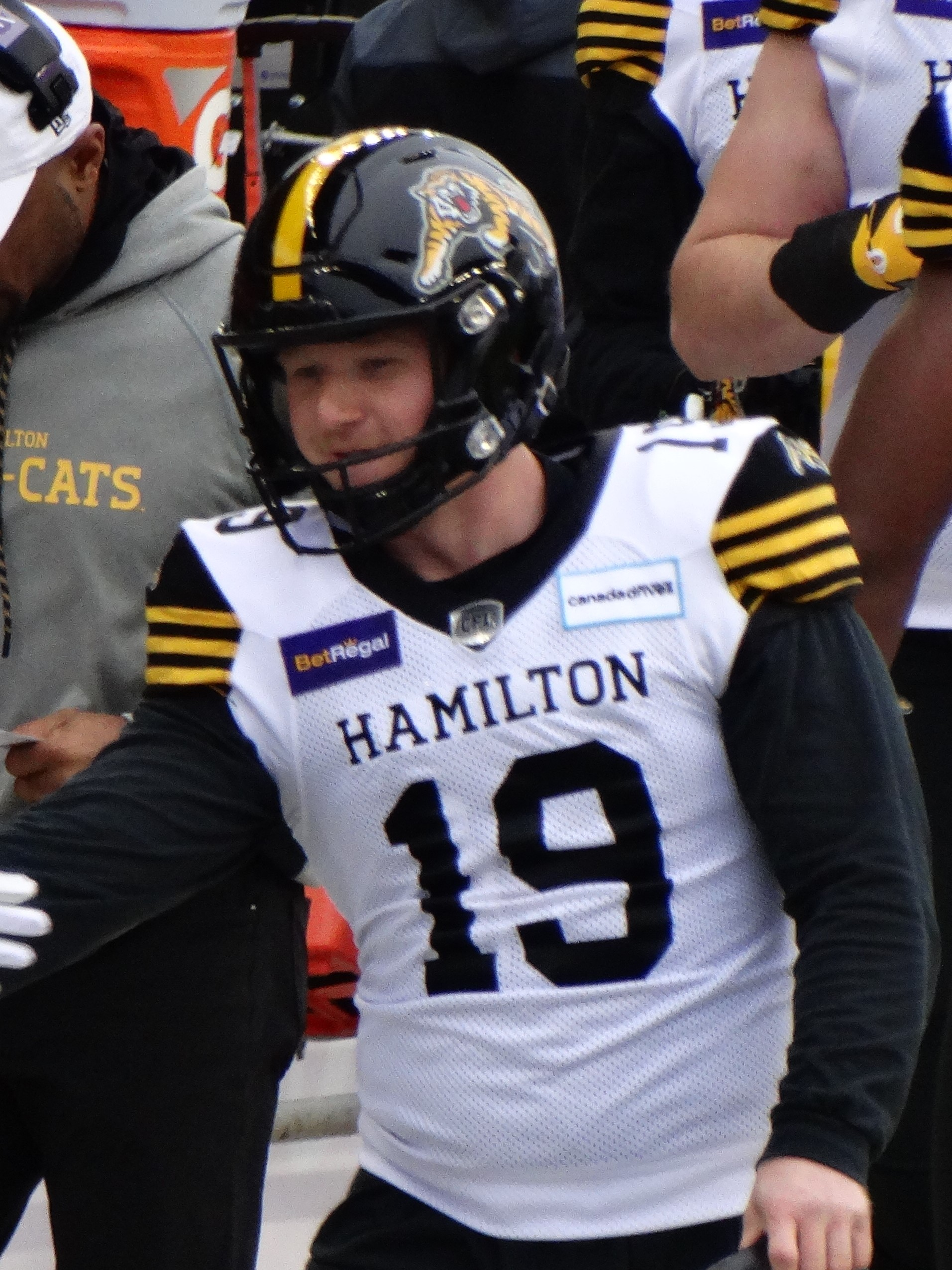
Domagala with the Hamilton Tiger-Cats in 2021

=== Hamilton Tiger-Cats ===
After completing his university career, he signed as a free agent with the Hamilton Tiger-Cats on December 12, 2018. He played in the first pre-season game of the 2019 season where he made one of two field goal attempts, punted eight times for a 49.9-yard average, and had six kickoffs for a 60.8-yard average, but was released by the team on June 9, 2019. He was not signed by any other team and did not play in 2019. Due to the cancellation of the 2020 CFL season, he was also un-signed in 2020.

On July 10, 2021, it was announced that Domagala had re-signed with the Tiger-Cats. He was signed to the team's practice roster to begin the 2021 season where he spent the first two games. Following the team's bye week, Domagala was promoted to the active roster and made his regular season professional debut on August 27, 2021, in a game against the Montreal Alouettes. He converted his first career field goal attempt which was from 12 yards out and finished the game with two field goals out of four attempts and had five kickoffs for a 60.6-yard average. He played in six regular season games in 2021 where he connected on seven of ten field goal attempts and had 25 punts with a 43.4-yard average. He also played in all three post-season games where he made all six field goal attempts, including 3-for-3 in the 108th Grey Cup loss to the Winnipeg Blue Bombers.

In 2022, Domagala played in 17 regular season games where he made 12 of 16 field goal attempts and punted 65 times for an average of 44.8 yards. He became a free agent upon the expiry of his contract on February 14, 2023.

=== Edmonton Elks ===
Domagala joined the Edmonton Elks in free agency on February 16, 2023. He played in two preseason games where he punted five times with a 40.4-yard average, but was released at the end of training camp.

=== Ottawa Redblacks ===
On September 19, 2023, it was announced that Domagala had signed with the Ottawa Redblacks following an injury to their incumbent kicker, Lewis Ward. He played in five regular season games where he made eight of nine field goal attempts. He returned to the team in 2024, but was on and off the roster during training camp before being released outright on May 28, 2024.

=== Montreal Alouettes ===
On July 9, 2024, it was announced that Domagala had signed with the Montreal Alouettes. He remained on the practice roster until his release on September 4, 2024.

=== Hamilton Tiger-Cats (second stint) ===
Domagala signed a practice roster agreement with the Hamilton Tiger-Cats in advance of the playoffs on October 29, 2025. His contract expired on November 9, 2025.
