= Tony Brown (wide receiver) =

American football player (born 1997)

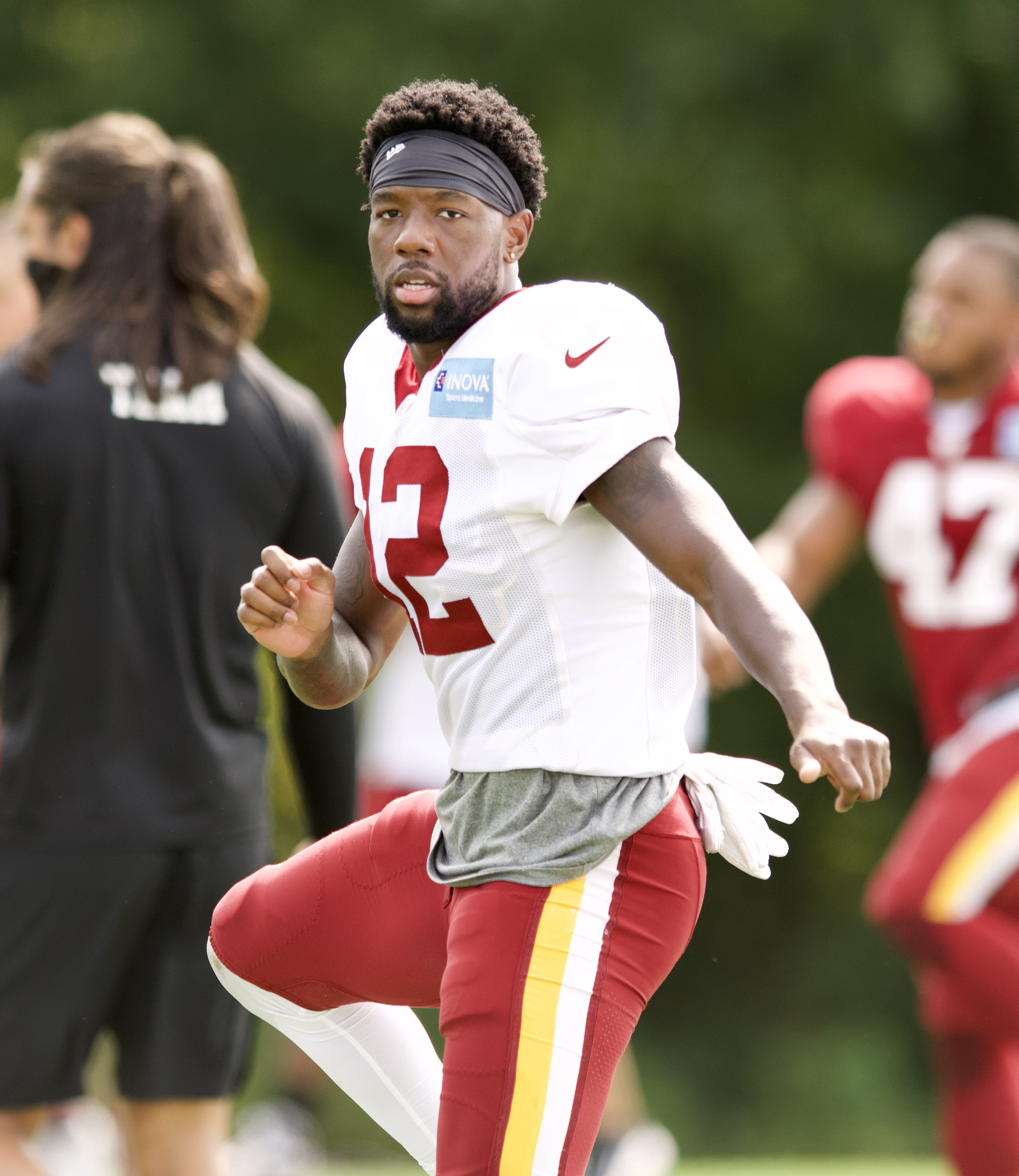
- Brown with Washington in 2020

Profile
- Position: Wide receiver

Personal information
- Born: August 8, 1997 (age 29); Norwalk, California, U.S.
- Listed height: 6 ft 1 in (1.85 m)
- Listed weight: 195 lb (88 kg)

Career information
- High school: La Mirada (La Mirada, California)
- College: Colorado
- NFL draft: 2020: undrafted

Career history
- Cleveland Browns (2020)*; New York Giants (2020)*; Washington Football Team (2020–2021); Hamilton Tiger-Cats (2022)*; Calgary Stampeders (2023)*
- * Offseason or practice squad member only
- Stats at Pro Football Reference

Tony Brown (born August 8, 1997) is an American football wide receiver. He played college football at Texas Tech and Colorado, and signed with the Cleveland Browns as an undrafted free agent in 2020. He has also been a member of the New York Giants, Washington Football Team, Hamilton Tiger-Cats, and Calgary Stampeders.

== College career ==
Brown began his collegiate career at Texas Tech. He played for the Red Raiders for two seasons and caught 27 passes for 378 yards and a touchdown in 24 games played. After his sophomore season, Brown announced his intent to transfer from Texas Tech and ultimately transferred to the University of Colorado.

After sitting out one year due to NCAA transfer rules, Brown finished third on the team with 32 receptions and 333 receiving yards along with one touchdown in his first season playing for the Buffaloes. As a redshirt senior, he led the team with 55 catches, 698 receiving yards and five touchdown receptions.

== Professional career ==
Pre-draft measurables
Height	Weight	Arm length	Hand span	Wingspan	40-yard dash	10-yard split	20-yard split	20-yard shuttle	Three-cone drill	Vertical jump	Broad jump	Bench press
6 ft 0 3/4 in (1.85 m)	198 lb (90 kg)	31 1/2 in (0.80 m)	9 1/4 in (0.23 m)	6 ft 4 in (1.93 m)	4.52 s	1.60 s	2.60 s	4.27 s	7.21 s	36.0 in (0.91 m)	9 ft 11 in (3.02 m)	14 reps
All values from NFL Combine/Pro Day

=== Cleveland Browns ===
Brown was signed by the Cleveland Browns as an undrafted free agent on April 25, 2020. He was waived by the Browns on July 31, 2020.

=== New York Giants ===
Brown was claimed off waivers by the New York Giants on August 1, 2020, but was waived on August 27, 2020.

=== Washington Football Team ===
Brown was signed by the Washington Football Team on August 31, 2020. He was waived during final roster cuts and was re-signed to the team's practice squad on September 6, 2020, before being promoted to the active roster on October 24, 2020. He was waived on November 9, 2020. On January 11, 2021, Brown signed a reserve/futures contract with Washington. Brown was released on August 31, 2021.

=== Hamilton Tiger-Cats ===
On February 8, 2022, Brown signed with the Hamilton Tiger-Cats of the Canadian Football League (CFL). He was released on June 5 and later signed to the team's practice roster on August 10. He was released on November 7, 2022.

=== Calgary Stampeders ===
On February 9, 2023, Brown signed with the Calgary Stampeders of the CFL. On May 21, 2023, Brown was released by the Stampeders.
