= Jordan Murray (Canadian football) =

American gridiron football player (born 1997)

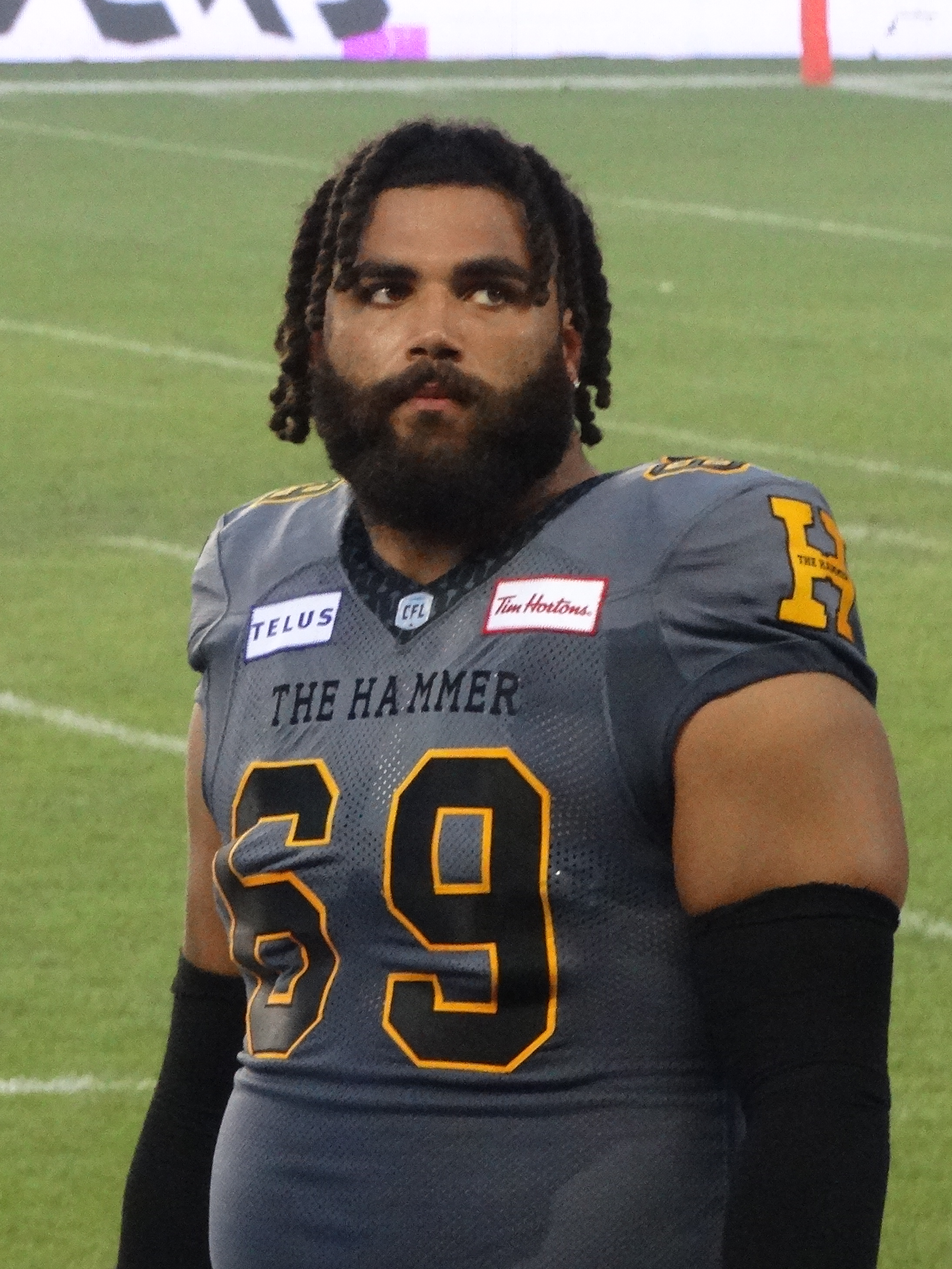
- Murray with the Hamilton Tiger-Cats in 2024

No. 68 – Edmonton Elks
- Position: Offensive tackle
- Roster status: 6-game injured list
- CFL status: American

Personal information
- Born: May 17, 1997 (age 29); Coppell, Texas, U.S.
- Listed height: 6 ft 8 in (2.03 m)
- Listed weight: 300 lb (136 kg)

Career information
- High school: Coppell
- College: North Texas
- NFL draft: 2019: undrafted

Career history
- Hamilton Tiger-Cats (2021); Indianapolis Colts (2022)*; Hamilton Tiger-Cats (2023–2025); Edmonton Elks (2026–present)
- * Offseason or practice squad member only

Awards and highlights
- Grey Cup champion (2026)
- Stats at Pro Football Reference
- Stats at CFL.ca

Jordan Murray (born May 17, 1997) is an American professional football offensive tackle for the Edmonton Elks of the Canadian Football League (CFL). He has also been a member of the Indianapolis Colts of the National Football League (NFL).

== College career ==
Murray played college football for the North Texas Mean Green from 2015 to 2018, where he appeared in 44 games, playing at both guard and tackle, over the course of four seasons.

== Professional career ==
Pre-draft measurables
Height	Weight	Arm length	Hand span	Wingspan	40-yard dash	10-yard split	20-yard split	20-yard shuttle	Vertical jump	Bench press
6 ft 9 1/4 in (2.06 m)	346 lb (157 kg)	36 in (0.91 m)	10 1/2 in (0.27 m)	7 ft 2 7/8 in (2.21 m)	5.90 s	2.03 s	3.38 s	5.28 s	19.5 in (0.50 m)	18 reps
All values from Pro Day

Upon completing his college eligibility, Murray attended rookie mini-camp with the Seattle Seahawks in 2019, but was not signed by the team. He then played for the Generals of The Spring League in 2020.

=== Hamilton Tiger-Cats ===
Murray was signed by the Hamilton Tiger-Cats on July 19, 2021. He began the 2021 season on the practice roster, but was promoted to the team's active roster in Week 4 and made his professional debut, starting at right tackle, on August 27, 2021, against the Montreal Alouettes. Murray played and started in nine regular season games for the Tiger-Cats in 2021 and also started in the East Final. On January 15, 2022, he was released in order to pursue a contract in the National Football League.

=== Indianapolis Colts ===
On January 20, 2022, Murray signed a reserve/future contract with the Indianapolis Colts. He was waived on August 30, 2022 and signed to the practice squad the next day. He signed a reserve/future contract on January 9, 2023. He was waived on August 1, 2023.

=== Hamilton Tiger-Cats (II) ===
On September 2, 2023, Murray re-signed with the Tiger-Cats.

=== Edmonton Elks ===
The Edmonton Elks announced that they had signed Murray through free agency on February 11, 2026.
