= Tommy Condell =

Canadian gridiron football coach (born 1971)

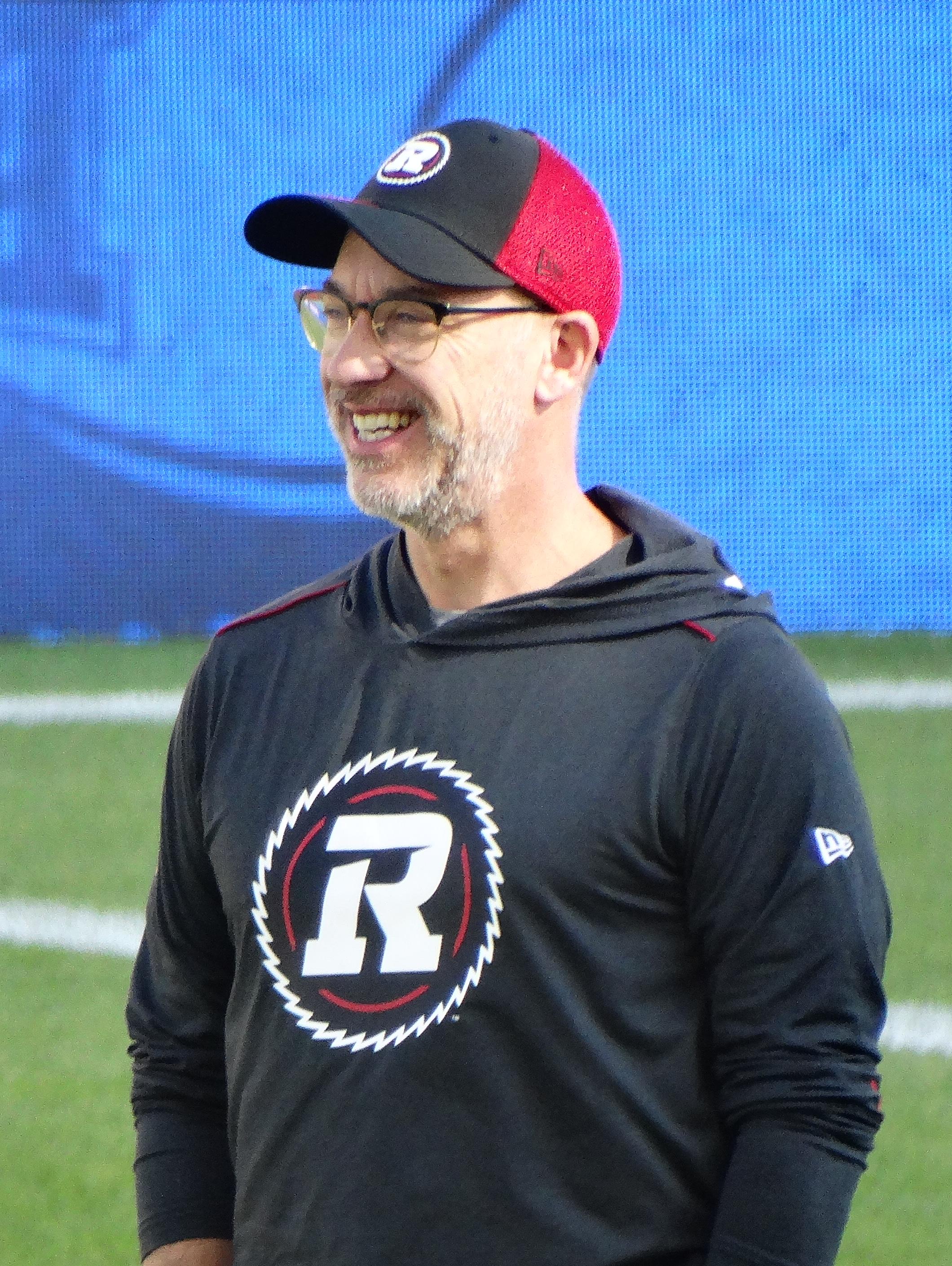
- Condell with the Ottawa Redblacks in 2024

Winnipeg Blue Bombers
- Title: Offensive coordinator

Personal information
- Born: 1971 (age 54–55)

Career information
- College: Lock Haven; Cortland State

Career history
- 1995: Illinois Wesleyan Titans (Running backs coach)
- 1996: Albany Firebirds (Running backs, linebackers coach)
- 1996: Hamilton Continentals (Receivers coach)
- 1997: Winnipeg Blue Bombers (Special teams coordinator)
- 1998–1999: McNeese State Cowboys (Tight ends coach, assistant offensive line coach)
- 2000: Stephen F. Austin Lumberjacks (Receivers coach, pass game coordinator)
- 2001: Louisiana–Monroe Indians (Special teams coordinator, tight ends coach)
- 2002–2003: Louisiana–Monroe Indians (Offensive coordinator, quarterbacks coach)
- 2004–2005: Ottawa Renegades (Quarterbacks, receivers coach, passing coordinator)
- 2006: Saskatchewan Roughriders (Offensive coordinator)
- 2007–2009: Southeastern Louisiana Lions (Offensive coordinator, quarterbacks coach)
- 2010–2012: Cornell Big Red (Assistant head coach, wide receivers coach)
- 2013–2015: Hamilton Tiger-Cats (Offensive coordinator, receivers coach)
- 2017–2018: Toronto Argonauts (Receivers coach)
- 2018: Toronto Argonauts (Offensive coordinator)
- 2019–2023: Hamilton Tiger-Cats (Offensive coordinator)
- 2020–2023: Hamilton Tiger-Cats (Quarterbacks coach)
- 2024–2025: Ottawa Redblacks (Offensive coordinator)
- 2026–present: Winnipeg Blue Bombers (Offensive coordinator)

Awards and highlights
- Grey Cup champion (2017)

Thomas Condell is a professional Canadian football coach who is the offensive coordinator for the Winnipeg Blue Bombers of the Canadian Football League (CFL). He is a Grey Cup champion having won as an assistant coach with the Toronto Argonauts in 2017. He played college football as a wide receiver for the Lock Haven Bald Eagles and Cortland Red Dragons.

== Coaching career ==
=== Early coaching career ===
Condell began his coaching career at Illinois Wesleyan University as a running backs coach for the Titans in 1995. In 1996, he spent time as an assistant coach for the Arena Football League's Albany Firebirds in the spring before moving to Hamilton College that same year in the fall. After that, he was hired by Jeff Reinebold in 1997 to serve as the special teams coordinator for the Winnipeg Blue Bombers of the Canadian Football League. He stayed there for one season before moving back to college football.

In 1998, Condell joined the McNeese State Cowboys program as the team's tight ends coach and assistant offensive line coach, giving him his first opportunity in NCAA Division I. He spent two years there before moving to the Stephen F. Austin Lumberjacks as the receivers coach and pass game coordinator in 2000. In 2001, he got his first opportunity as a coordinator with a college football team as he became the special teams coordinator for the Louisiana–Monroe Indians. After one year with Louisiana-Monroe, he was promoted to offensive coordinator and served in that capacity in 2002 and 2003.

=== Ottawa Renegades ===
Condell returned to the CFL in 2004 to serve as the quarterbacks coach, receivers coach, and passing coordinator for the Ottawa Renegades. He spent two years with the Renegades as the club failed to qualify for the playoffs in both years.

=== Saskatchewan Roughriders ===
In 2006, Condell joined the Saskatchewan Roughriders as their offensive coordinator. While he was on a two-year contract and incoming head coach Kent Austin expressed interest in retaining him (the pair worked together in Ottawa), Condell left the Roughriders after one year.

=== Southeastern Louisiana ===
Condell went back to US college football in 2007 and joined the Southeastern Louisiana Lions as their offensive coordinator and quarterbacks coach. He spent three seasons with the Lions, including serving as acting head coach for the final six games of the 2008 season.

=== Cornell Big Red ===
In 2010, he was hired as the assistant head coach and wide receivers coach for the Cornell Big Red football team, reuniting him with the team's head coach, Kent Austin. Condell spent three years with Cornell.

=== Hamilton Tiger-Cats ===
Condell returned to the CFL with Austin and was announced as the offensive coordinator and receivers coach for the Hamilton Tiger-Cats on December 20, 2012. Under Condell, the team played in the Grey Cup championship game in 2013 and 2014, but lost in both games. In 2015, the Tiger-Cats led the league in points scored, but lost the East Final to the Ottawa Redblacks. Condell resigned from the Tiger-Cats shortly before the 2016 season on April 11, 2016 due to family reasons.

=== Toronto Argonauts ===
On March 22, 2017, Condell was named the receivers coach for the Toronto Argonauts. In 2017, he won his first Grey Cup championship after an Argonaut victory in the 105th Grey Cup game. Receiver DeVier Posey was named the game's Most Valuable Player. In 2018, Condell was promoted to offensive coordinator, but the Argonauts regressed to a 4–14 record and failed to qualify for the playoffs.

=== Hamilton Tiger-Cats (II) ===
Condell returned to the Hamilton Tiger-Cats as he was announced as the team's receivers coach on January 16, 2019. Following the resignation of June Jones, he was promoted to offensive coordinator on May 13, 2019. That year, the Tiger-Cats finished with a franchise-best 15–3 record and played in the 107th Grey Cup, but lost to the Winnipeg Blue Bombers. Condell added the title of quarterbacks coach in 2020, but with the 2020 CFL season cancelled, he signed an extension to stay with the Tiger-Cats for the 2021 season on December 28, 2020. On August 7, 2023, Condell and the Ti-Cats mutually agreed to part ways.

=== Ottawa Redblacks ===
On December 4, 2023, it was announced that Condell had been hired as the offensive coordinator for the Ottawa Redblacks. He served in that capacity for two years.

=== Winnipeg Blue Bombers ===
On December 22, 2025, the Winnipeg Blue Bombers announced that Condell had been hired as the team's offensive coordinator. The move reunited him with quarterback Zach Collaros who he worked with from 2013 to 2015 with the Hamilton Tiger-Cats.

== Personal life ==
Condell grew up in Utica, New York. He and his wife, Mandy, have four sons and live in Ancaster, Ontario. He obtained a Bachelor of Physical Education from Cortland State in 1992 and a master's degree in kinesiology from Stephen F. Austin State University.
