= Jumal Rolle =

American gridiron football player (born 1990)

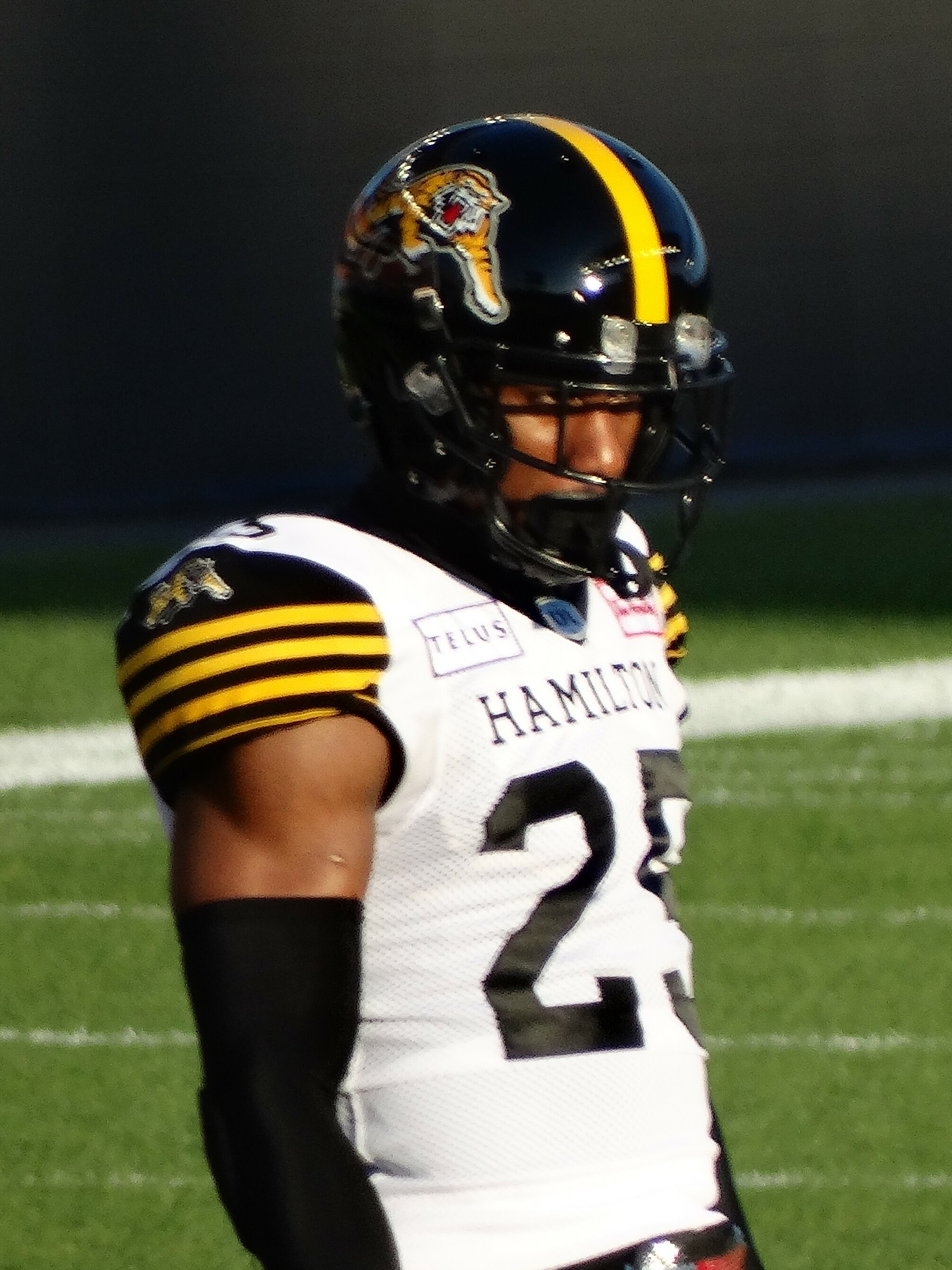
- Rolle with the Hamilton Tiger-Cats in 2022

No. 20, 38, 25
- Position: Defensive back

Personal information
- Born: May 28, 1990 (age 36); Wilson, North Carolina, U.S.
- Listed height: 6 ft 0 in (1.83 m)
- Listed weight: 188 lb (85 kg)

Career information
- High school: E. T. Beddingfield (Wilson, North Carolina)
- College: Catawba (2009–2012)
- NFL draft: 2013: undrafted

Career history
- Buffalo Bills (2013)*; New Orleans Saints (2013)*; Green Bay Packers (2013–2014); Houston Texans (2014–2015); Baltimore Ravens (2015–2016); Arizona Cardinals (2017)*; Buffalo Bills (2017)*; Hamilton Tiger-Cats (2018–2022); Montreal Alouettes (2023)*
- * Offseason or practice squad member only

Awards and highlights
- CFL All-Star (2021); 2× CFL East All-Star (2021–2022)

Career NFL statistics
- Total tackles: 22
- Interceptions: 3
- Stats at Pro Football Reference

Career CFL statistics
- Games played: 65
- Total tackles: 158
- Interceptions: 11
- Defensive touchdowns: 2
- Stats at CFL.ca

Jumal Dequavius Rolle (born May 28, 1990) is an American former gridiron football defensive back. He has been a member of the Buffalo Bills, New Orleans Saints, Green Bay Packers, Houston Texans, Baltimore Ravens, Arizona Cardinals, Hamilton Tiger-Cats, and Montreal Alouettes. Rolle played college football at Catawba.

== Professional career ==
=== Buffalo Bills ===
On April 29, 2013, he signed with the Buffalo Bills as an undrafted free agent. On August 26, 2013, he was released by the Bills.

=== New Orleans Saints ===
He was claimed via waivers by New Orleans Saints on August 27, 2013. On August 31, 2013, he was waived by the Saints. On September 1, 2013, he cleared waivers and was signed to the Saints' practice squad.

Rolle was waived from by the Saints on October 2, 2013.

=== Green Bay Packers ===
Rolle was signed to the Green Bay Packers' practice squad on October 8, 2013. On December 27, 2013, he was signed to the active roster.

=== Houston Texans ===
On October 1, 2014, the Houston Texans signed Rolle off the Green Bay Packers' practice squad. He got his first and second interceptions on November 2, 2014, vs. the Philadelphia Eagles. Rolle kept his hot streak going by intercepting Titans backup quarterback Jake Locker's only pass attempt in Week 13. After the game, Rolle admitted he wasn't sure he would ever play defense for Houston, due to the fact he was signed for special teams. His start at nickel cornerback did not prove to be too big a task for Rolle, as he had 3 interceptions and 4 pass break-ups despite playing in only 6 games at that point in the 2014 season. On November 19, 2015, Rolle was waived by the Texans.

=== Baltimore Ravens ===
On November 20, 2015, Rolle was signed to the Baltimore Ravens' practice squad. He was promoted to the active roster on December 15, 2015.

Rolle suffered a torn Achilles during the offseason and missed the entire 2016 season.

=== Arizona Cardinals ===
On May 9, 2017, Rolle was signed by the Arizona Cardinals. He was waived on July 27, 2017.

=== Buffalo Bills (II) ===
On August 12, 2017, Rolle signed with the Bills. On August 29, 2017, he was released by the Bills.

=== Hamilton Tiger-Cats ===
On August 19, 2018, Rolle signed with the Hamilton Tiger-Cats of the Canadian Football League (CFL). In his first season in the CFL, Rolle played in 17 games contributing with 43 defensive tackles and two interceptions. In the 2019 season, Rolle played in all 18 regular-season games for Hamilton with 11 starts at cornerback, registering 32 defensive tackles, five special teams tackles, and seven pass knockdowns while leading the team and tying for third in the CFL with five interceptions. On January 31, 2020, Rolle and the Ti-Cats agreed to a two-year contract extension, preventing him from becoming a free agent in February. The 2020 season was ultimately cancelled due to the COVID-19 pandemic.

In 2021, he started all 14 regular season games at cornerback and recorded 40 defensive tackles, 11 pass knockdowns, and two interceptions. He also scored his first career touchdown on September 22, 2021, against the Ottawa Redblacks when he returned an interception for the score. He was later named a Division and CFL All-Star for the first time in his career. During the 2022 season, Rolle had 35 defensive tackles, two interceptions, and one touchdown as he was again named a Division All-Star. He became a free agent on February 14, 2023.

=== Montreal Alouettes ===
On February 15, 2023, it was announced that Rolle had signed a one-year contract with the Montreal Alouettes. In May, he informed the team that he intended to retire and was placed on the suspended list. He did not play in 2023 and his contract expired on February 13, 2024.
