= Tyler Ternowski =

Canadian gridiron football player (born 1998)

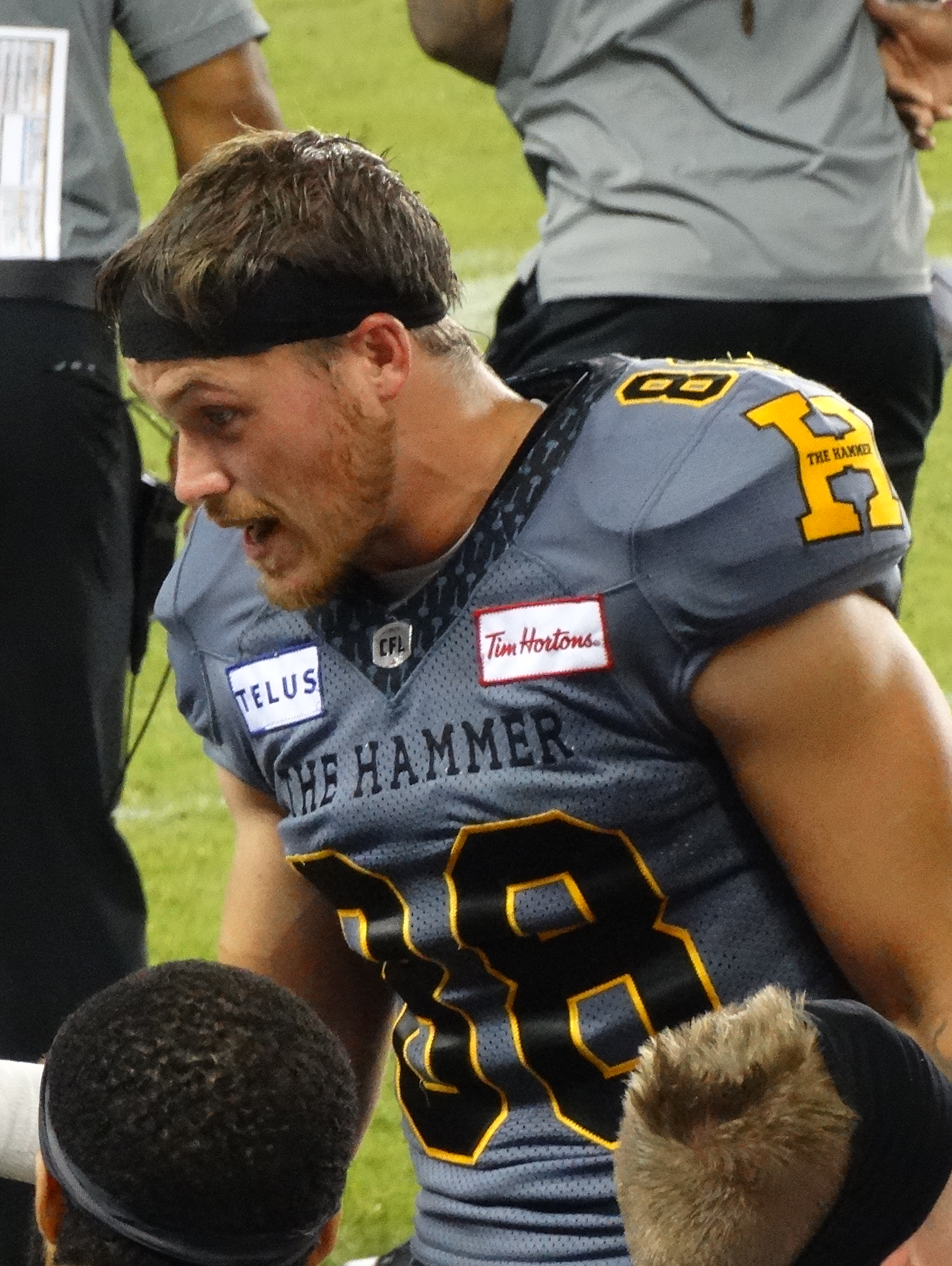
- Ternowski with the Hamilton Tiger-Cats in 2024

No. 88 – Hamilton Tiger-Cats
- Position: Wide receiver
- Roster status: Active
- CFL status: National

Personal information
- Born: February 25, 1998 (age 28); Hamilton, Ontario, Canada
- Listed height: 6 ft 0 in (1.83 m)
- Listed weight: 185 lb (84 kg)

Career information
- High school: Sir Allan MacNab
- University: Waterloo
- CFL draft: 2020: 3rd round, 27th overall pick

Career history
- 2021–present: Hamilton Tiger-Cats

Awards and highlights
- 2× First-team All-Canadian (2018, 2019)
- Stats at CFL.ca

Tyler Ternowski (born February 25, 1998) is a Canadian professional football wide receiver for the Hamilton Tiger-Cats of the Canadian Football League (CFL).

== University career ==
Ternowski played U Sports football for the Waterloo Warriors from 2016 to 2019. Over the course of his university career, he played in 29 games and recorded 164 receptions for 2,949 yards and 26 touchdowns. He was named a U Sports First Team All-Canadian in 2018 and 2019 and he set an OUA record for most receiving touchdowns in a single season with 14 in 2018.

== Professional career ==
Pre-draft measurables
Height	Weight
6 ft 0 in (1.83 m)	180 lb (82 kg)
Values from Pro Day

Ternowski was drafted in the third round, 27th overall by the Hamilton Tiger-Cats in the 2020 CFL draft, but did not play in 2020 due to the cancellation of the 2020 CFL season. He then signed with the team on January 21, 2021. Ternowski made the team's active roster following training camp in 2021 and played in his first career professional game on August 5, 2021, against the Winnipeg Blue Bombers. He played primarily as a backup receiver and on special teams, but he recorded his first career catch, for 48 yards, against the Edmonton Elks, on October 29, 2021. He played in all 14 regular season games and had two catches for 56 yards and four special teams tackles.
