= Nic Cross =

Canadian gridiron football player (born 1999)

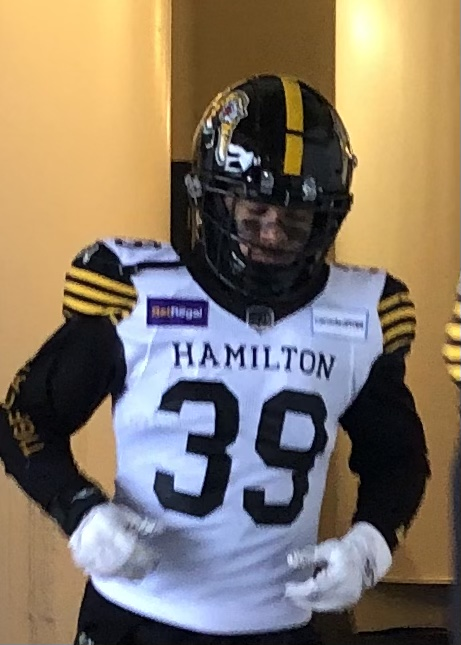
- Cross with the Hamilton Tiger-Cats in 2021

Edmonton Elks
- Position: Linebacker
- Roster status: Active
- CFL status: National

Personal information
- Born: June 22, 1999 (age 27); Regina, Saskatchewan, Canada
- Listed height: 5 ft 11 in (1.80 m)
- Listed weight: 200 lb (91 kg)

Career information
- Position: Linebacker (No. 39)
- High school: Dr. Martin LeBoldus High
- CJFL: Okanagan Sun
- University: British Columbia; Regina
- CFL draft: 2021: 1st round, 9th overall pick

Career history

Playing
- 2021–2024: Hamilton Tiger-Cats

Operations
- 2026–present: Edmonton Elks

Awards and highlights
- First-team U Sports All-Canadian (2019)
- Stats at CFL.ca

Nic Cross (born June 22, 1999) is a Canadian former professional football linebacker and is a football operations assistant for the Edmonton Elks of the Canadian Football League (CFL).

== Amateur career ==
=== Regina Rams ===
Cross first began his U Sports football career with the Regina Rams in 2017. After a strong performance in training camp, he started at sam linebacker for the Rams in their season opener and played in all eight regular season games as a rookie. He led the team in tackles with 33 and had 26 assisted tackles, a sack, an interception, and a forced fumble. He also had six solo tackles and two assisted tackles in the team's Canada West Semi-final loss to UBC. At the end of the season, he was named a U Sports Second Team All-Canadian and won the Peter Gorman Trophy as U Sports football's rookie of the year. However, the awards were removed on June 20, 2018, after it was confirmed that he had failed a drug test due to testing positive for cannabis (a banned substance at the time). He was also given a two-month suspension and was not eligible to return to play until January 4, 2019 (long after the 2018 season would have concluded).

=== Okanagan Sun ===
Cross joined the Okanagan Sun of the Canadian Junior Football League for the 2018 season. He played in four games where he had eight tackles, two assisted tackles, and one fumble recovery for a touchdown.

=== UBC Thunderbirds ===
Upon becoming eligible to return to play in U Sports, Cross transferred to the University of British Columbia to play for the Thunderbirds in 2019. That year, he led the nation in total tackles with 66.5 and also had a sack and an interception. Cross was subsequently named a U Sports First Team All-Canadian at linebacker. He did not play in 2020 due to the cancellation of the 2020 U Sports football season and remained draft-eligible for the Canadian Football League in 2021.

== Professional career ==
Pre-draft measurables
Height	Weight
5 ft 11 in (1.80 m)	203 lb (92 kg)
Values from CFL Combine

Cross was drafted in the first round, ninth overall, by the Hamilton Tiger-Cats in the 2021 CFL draft and signed with the team on May 21, 2021. He made the team's active roster following training camp in 2021 and played in his first career professional game on August 5, 2021, against the Winnipeg Blue Bombers, where he recorded two special teams tackles. Cross played in 12 regular season games where he had two defensive tackles and led the team in special teams tackles with 17. He also played in his first playoff game that year, in the East Semi-Final against the Montreal Alouettes, where he had one special teams tackle.

In 2022, Cross played in just five regular season games where he had six special teams tackles. He returned in 2023 to play in 17 regular season games and had 14 special teams tackles and one forced fumble. Cross spent the entire 2024 season on the six-game injured list and did not dress in any games. He was released shortly before 2025 training camp on May 5, 2025.

== Operations career ==
On February 12, 2026, it was announced that Cross had joined the football operations staff of the Edmonton Elks as the team's football operations assistant.
