= Tunde Adeleke =

Canadian gridiron football player (born 1995)

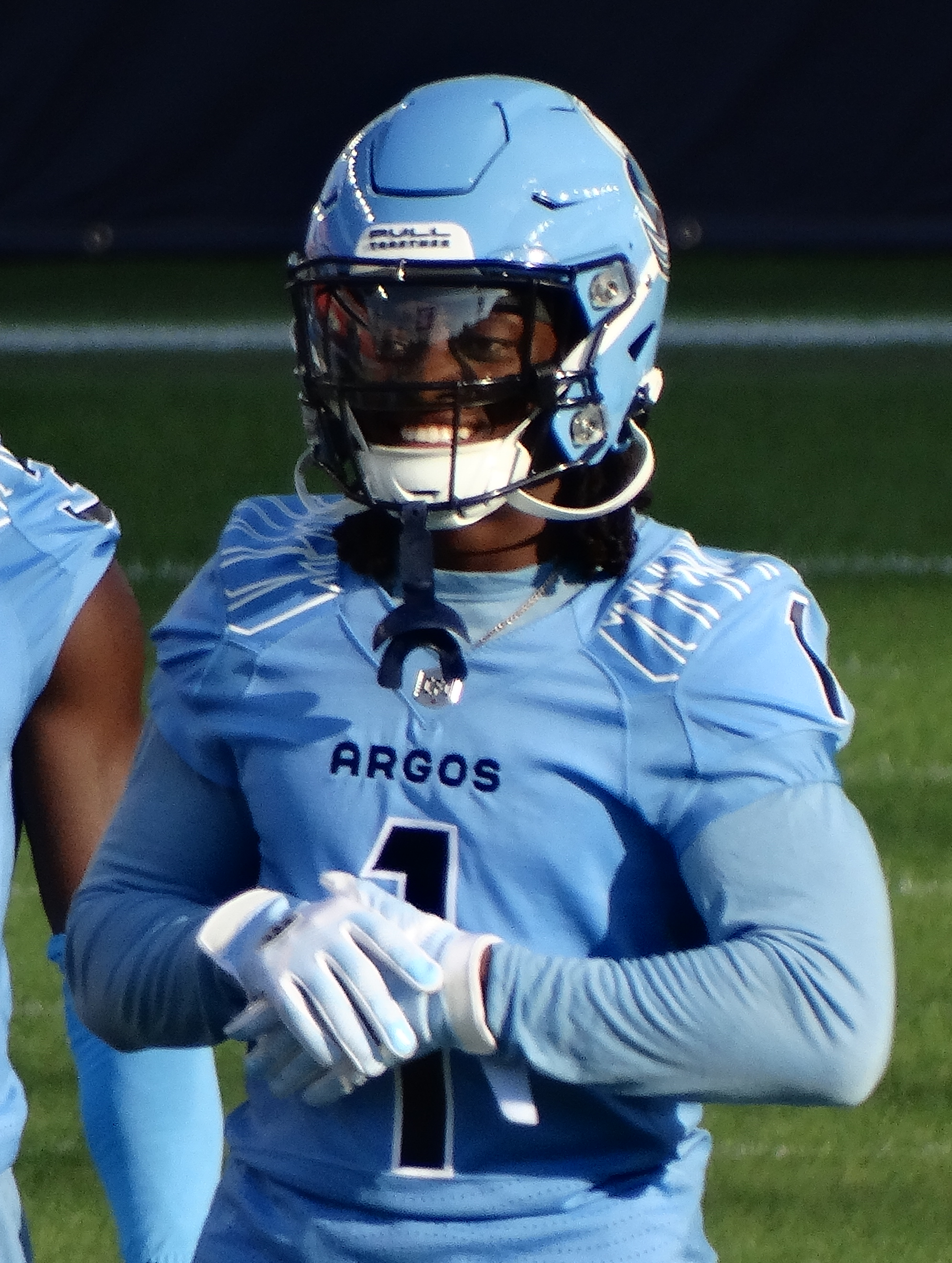
- Adeleke with the Toronto Argonauts in 2024

Carleton Ravens
- Title: Co-pass game coordinator/Assistant special teams coach

Personal information
- Born: July 12, 1995 (age 31); Lagos, Nigeria
- Listed height: 5 ft 10 in (1.78 m)
- Listed weight: 208 lb (94 kg)

Career information
- Position: Defensive back (No. 27, 2, 3)
- High school: St. Francis Xavier
- University: Carleton
- CFL draft: 2017: 3rd round, 25th overall pick

Career history

Playing
- 2017–2018: Calgary Stampeders
- 2019–2023: Hamilton Tiger-Cats
- 2024: Toronto Argonauts
- 2025: Ottawa Redblacks*
- * Offseason or practice squad member only

Coaching
- 2025–present: Carleton Ravens

Awards and highlights
- 2× Grey Cup champion (2018, 2024); CFL All-Star (2019); 3× CFL East All-Star (2019, 2021, 2022)
- Stats at CFL.ca

Tunde Adeleke (born July 12, 1995) is a Nigerian-Canadian former professional football defensive back who is the co-pass game coordinator and assistant special teams coach for the Carleton Ravens of U Sports football. He played for seven seasons in the Canadian Football League (CFL) where he was a three-time divisional All-Star and was a CFL All-Star in 2019. He is a two-time Grey Cup champion after winning with the Calgary Stampeders in 2018 and with the Toronto Argonauts in 2024.

== Early life ==
Adeleke was born in Lagos, Nigeria, and grew up in Ottawa, Ontario, Canada.

== University career ==
Adeleke played U Sports football for the Carleton Ravens from 2013 to 2016. He played in 31 games where he recorded 155 tackles, three interceptions, one sack, four forced fumbles, and 9 return touchdowns.

== Professional career ==
Pre-draft measurables
Height	Weight	40-yard dash	20-yard shuttle	Three-cone drill	Vertical jump	Broad jump	Bench press
5 ft 9 7/8 in (1.77 m)	190 lb (86 kg)	4.58 s	4.47 s	7.42 s	32.0 in (0.81 m)	9 ft 5 1/4 in (2.88 m)	16 reps
All values from CFL Combine

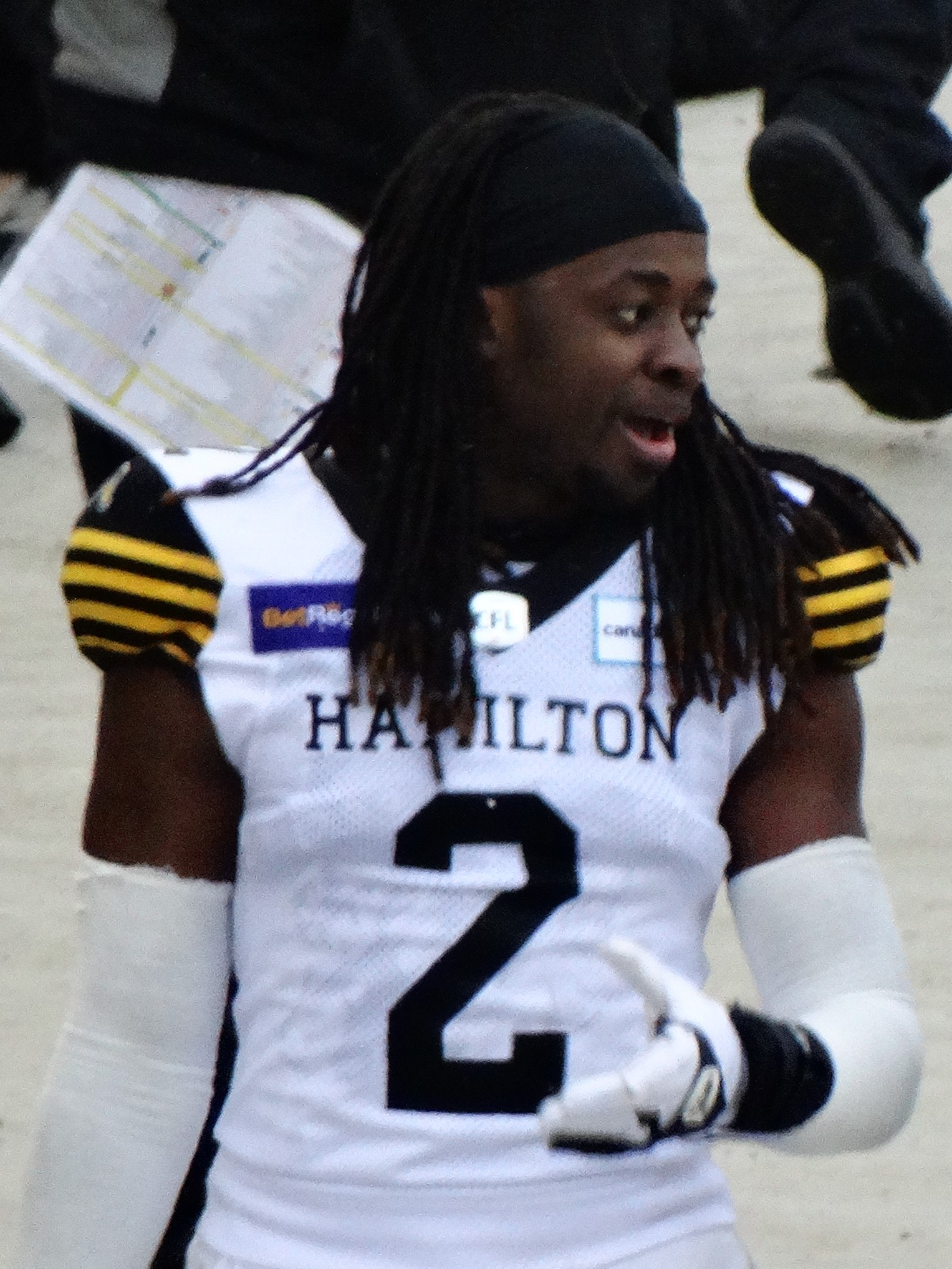
Adeleke with the Hamilton Tiger-Cats in 2021

=== Calgary Stampeders ===
Adeleke was drafted by the Calgary Stampeders in the third round, 25th overall, in the 2017 CFL draft and signed with the team on May 27, 2017. He played for two seasons with the Stampeders and won his first Grey Cup championship after the team's victory in the 106th Grey Cup game.

=== Hamilton Tiger-Cats ===
Adeleke signed as a free agent with the Hamilton Tiger-Cats on February 12, 2019. In 2019, he played in 18 regular season games, starting in 15, where he had 52 defensive tackles, five special teams tackles, and two interceptions. He was then named a CFL All-Star for the first time in his career. He also played in both post-season games, including the 107th Grey Cup, where he had six defensive tackles and one pass knockdown in the team's loss to the Winnipeg Blue Bombers. He did not play in 2020 due to the cancellation of the 2020 CFL season.

In the 2021 season, Adeleke played and started in 12 of 14 regular season games in a truncated season where he recorded 44 defensive tackles, six pass knockdowns, two sacks, and two interceptions. He also played and started in all three of the team's post-season games where he recorded 16 defensive tackles and two pass knockdowns. Adeleke played in his fourth consecutive Grey Cup game, but lost for the third time as the Blue Bombers defeated the Tiger-Cats 33–25 in overtime.

Adeleke played and started in all 18 regular season games for the first time in his career in 2022 where he recorded a career-high 68 defensive tackles and eight pass knockdowns along with two special teams tackles, one forced fumble, one sack, and one interception. He also played in the team's East Semi-Final loss to the Montreal Alouettes where he had three defensive tackles and his first post-season interception.

In 2023, Adeleke sat out eight games due to injury, playing in ten, where he had 31 defensive tackles, three special teams tackles, one pass knockdown, one forced fumble, and one fumble return. He suffered a season-ending injury in week 14 and did not play in the team's playoff game. He became a free agent upon the expiry of his contract on February 13, 2024.

=== Toronto Argonauts ===
On February 13, 2024, it was announced that Adeleke had signed with the Toronto Argonauts. He began the season on the six-game injured list before being placed on the practice roster for the two subsequent games. He then played in the last ten regular season games, including three starts, where he had 15 defensive tackles, one special teams tackle, and one pass knockdown. Adeleke started in all three post-season games, including the 111th Grey Cup where he had two defensive tackles in the Argonauts' 41–24 victory over the Winnipeg Blue Bombers. He became a free agent upon the expiry of his contract on February 11, 2025.

=== Ottawa Redblacks ===
On February 11, 2025, Adeleke signed a one-year contract with the Ottawa Redblacks. However, on May 9, 2025, just before the open of training camp for the 2025 season, Adeleke was placed on the retired list.

== Coaching career ==
Adeleke joined the coaching staff for the Carleton Ravens as the team's co-pass game coordinator and assistant special teams coach for the 2025 season.
