= Myles Manalo =

Canadian gridiron football player and coach (born 1999)

Western Mustangs
- Title: Special teams coordinator

Personal information
- Born: June 18, 1999 (age 27); Burlington, Ontario, Canada
- Listed height: 6 ft 1 in (1.85 m)
- Listed weight: 230 lb (104 kg)

Career information
- Positions: Linebacker, Fullback (No. 42, 41)
- High school: Corpus Christi Catholic (Burlington)
- University: Western (2017, 2019)
- CFL draft: 2021: 6th round, 54th overall pick

Career history

Playing
- Hamilton Tiger-Cats (2021–2023); Montreal Alouettes (2023)

Coaching
- Western Mustangs (2025–present) Special teams coordinator

Awards and highlights
- Grey Cup champion (2023); Vanier Cup champion (2017)

Career CFL statistics
- Games played: 14
- Total tackles: 2
- Stats at CFL.ca

Myles Adrian Manalo (born June 18, 1999) is a Canadian professional football coach and former player who is the special teams coordinator for the Western Mustangs of the Ontario University Athletics (OUA). He played at linebacker and fullback for the Hamilton Tiger-Cats and Montreal Alouettes of the Canadian Football League (CFL). Manalo played U Sports football for the Western Mustangs.

== U Sports career ==
Manalo played U Sports football for the Western Mustangs in 2017 and 2019. He played in 21 games, starting in four, recording 70 tackles, including 6.5 tackles for loss, one interception, three pass deflections and one forced fumble. In 2017, Manalo was a member of the Western squad that won the 53rd Vanier Cup.

== Professional career ==
Pre-draft measurables
Height	Weight	40-yard dash	20-yard shuttle	Three-cone drill	Vertical jump	Broad jump	Bench press
6 ft 2 1/8 in (1.88 m)	228 lb (103 kg)	4.90 s	4.5 s	7.33 s	37 in (0.94 m)	8 ft 11 1/2 in (2.73 m)	16 reps
All values from CFL Combine

=== Hamilton Tiger-Cats ===
Manalo was selected by the Hamilton Tiger-Cats in the sixth round, 54th overall, of the 2021 CFL draft. In his first two seasons, he dressed in 13 games, as both a linebacker and fullback and made two special teams tackles. On January 31, 2023, Manalo signed an extension with the team. He dressed for one game and was released on September 6, 2023.

=== Montreal Alouettes ===
On November 1, 2023, Manalo signed to the practice roster of the Montreal Alouettes. He remained there while the Alouettes defeated the Winnipeg Blue Bombers in the 110th Grey Cup game. On November 20, Manalo was released by the team.

== Coaching career ==
Manalo began his coaching career at his alma mater, University of Western Ontario, as the special teams coordinator.
