= 2019 Hamilton Tiger-Cats season =

Canadian Football League season

- General manager: Drew Allemang and Shawn Burke
- Head coach: Orlondo Steinauer
- Home stadium: Tim Hortons Field

Results
- Record: 15–3
- Division place: 1st, East
- Playoffs: Lost Grey Cup
- Team MOP: Brandon Banks
- Team MOC: Brandon Revenberg
- Team MOR: Jaelon Acklin

Uniform

The 2019 Hamilton Tiger-Cats season was the 62nd season for the team in the Canadian Football League (CFL) and their 70th overall. It was the 150th year overall in the combined history of the Tiger-Cats and its predecessors the Wildcats and Tigers; the team held sesquicentennial celebrations throughout the season.

The Tiger-Cats improved upon their 8–10 record from 2018 and finished the 2019 regular season with a franchise best 15–3 record. They finished in first place for the first time since 2014 and attempted unsuccessfully to win their ninth Grey Cup championship. This is the first season under co-general managers Drew Allemang and Shawn Burke, and the first full season under head coach Orlondo Steinauer. It was announced on December 3, 2018, that Steinauer would take the reins as the Tiger-Cats' head coach, replacing June Jones in that capacity. The plan was for Jones to remain with the team as an associate head coach and offensive coordinator, but he resigned with the club and joined the Houston Roughnecks of the XFL as head coach.

On October 19, 2019, the Tiger-Cats defeated the Ottawa Redblacks and recorded a franchise-record 13th win in a season. The team finished the season with 15 wins and with a perfect home record for the first time since the CFL went to an 18-game schedule, winning all nine home games. Despite their success during the regular season, they lost to the Winnipeg Blue Bombers, a team that had a dominant performance during the 107th Grey Cup game. With the Blue Bombers ending a 29-year Grey Cup drought, the Hamilton Tiger-Cats now hold the longest active Grey Cup drought dating back to the 1999 season, having won the 87th Grey Cup that season.

== Offseason ==
=== Foreign drafts ===
For the first time in its history, the CFL held drafts for foreign players from Mexico and Europe. Like all other CFL teams, the Tiger-Cats held three non-tradeable selections in the 2019 CFL–LFA draft, which took place on January 14, 2019. The 2019 European CFL draft took place on April 11, 2019, where all teams held one non-tradeable pick.

Draft	Round	Pick	Player	Position	School/Club team
LFA	1	5	José Noriega	WR	Artilleros de Puebla
LFA	2	14	Omar Cojolum	RB	Mayas CDMX
LFA	3	23	Luis López	RB	Condors CDMX
Euro	1	1	Valentin Gnahoua	DL	Berlin Rebels

=== CFL draft ===
The 2019 CFL draft took place on May 2, 2019. The Tiger-Cats held eight selections in the eight-round draft, including three picks within the first 11 overall selections after trading Ryan Bomben and Jamal Robinson to the Montreal Alouettes.

Round	Pick	Player	Position	School	Hometown
1	2	Jesse Gibbon	OL	Waterloo	Hamilton, ON
2	10	Nikola Kalinic	WR	York	Toronto, ON
2	11	David Ungerer	WR	Idaho	Pullman, WA
3	22	Maleek Irons	RB	Ohio	Calgary, AB
3	24	Sheridan Lawley	DL	British Columbia	Abbotsford, BC
7	58	Derek Dufault	DL	Manitoba	Winnipeg, MB
8	65	Malcolm Campbell	DL	Toronto	Mississauga, ON
8	67	Gordon Whyte	LB	St. Francis Xavier	Toronto, ON

== Preseason ==
=== Schedule ===
Week	Game	Date	Kickoff	Opponent	Results		TV	Venue	Attendance	Summary
Week	Game	Date	Kickoff	Opponent	Score	Record	TV	Venue	Attendance	Summary
A	Bye									
B	1	Sat, June 1	7:00 p.m. EDT	@ Ottawa Redblacks	W 25–21	1–0	TSN	TD Place Stadium	22,318	Recap
C	2	Thu, June 6	7:30 p.m. EDT	Toronto Argonauts	L 30–23	1–1	Ticats.ca	Tim Hortons Field	NA	Recap

== Regular season ==
=== Season standings ===
East Division
Team	GP	W	L	T	Pts	PF	PA	Div	Stk	
Hamilton Tiger-Cats	18	15	3	0	30	551	344	7–1	W6	Details
Montreal Alouettes	18	10	8	0	20	479	485	5–3	W1	Details
Toronto Argonauts	18	4	14	0	8	373	562	3–5	L1	Details
Ottawa Redblacks	18	3	15	0	6	312	564	1–7	L11	Details

=== Season schedule ===
To accommodate for the viewership of the Toronto Raptors' 9pm EDT NBA Finals Game 6 start time on June 13, the CFL moved up the start time of the league opener that same day from 7:30pm to 7:00pm.

Week	Game	Date	Kickoff	Opponent	Results		TV	Venue	Attendance	Summary
Week	Game	Date	Kickoff	Opponent	Score	Record	TV	Venue	Attendance	Summary
1	1	Thu, June 13	7:00 p.m. EDT	Saskatchewan Roughriders	W 23–17	1–0	TSN/RDS	Tim Hortons Field	22,287	Recap
2	2	Sat, June 22	4:00 p.m. EDT	@ Toronto Argonauts	W 64–14	2–0	TSN/RDS	BMO Field	16,374	Recap
3	3	Fri, June 28	7:30 p.m. EDT	Montreal Alouettes	W 41–10	3–0	TSN/RDS/ESPN2	Tim Hortons Field	22,407	Recap
4	4	Thu, July 4	7:30 p.m. EDT	@ Montreal Alouettes	L 29–36	3–1	TSN/RDS	Molson Stadium	18,673	Recap
5	5	Sat, July 13	7:00 p.m. EDT	Calgary Stampeders	W 30–23	4–1	TSN/ESPN2	Tim Hortons Field	22,921	Recap
6	Bye									
7	6	Fri, July 26	7:00 p.m. EDT	Winnipeg Blue Bombers	W 23–15	5–1	TSN/RDS	Tim Hortons Field	23,512	Recap
8	7	Thu, Aug 1	9:30 p.m. EDT	@ Saskatchewan Roughriders	L 19–24	5–2	TSN	Mosaic Stadium	29,516	Recap
9	8	Sat, Aug 10	7:00 p.m. EDT	BC Lions	W 35–34	6–2	TSN/RDS	Tim Hortons Field	23,308	Recap
10	9	Sat, Aug 17	4:00 p.m. EDT	@ Ottawa Redblacks	W 21–7	7–2	TSN/RDS2	TD Place Stadium	23,214	Recap
11	10	Sat, Aug 24	10:00 p.m. EDT	@ BC Lions	W 13–10	8–2	TSN	BC Place	16,751	Recap
12	11	Mon, Sept 2	1:00 p.m. EDT	Toronto Argonauts	W 38–27	9–2	TSN	Tim Hortons Field	25,093	Recap
13	Bye									
14	12	Sat, Sept 14	4:00 p.m. EDT	@ Calgary Stampeders	L 18–19	9–3	TSN	McMahon Stadium	27,962	Recap
15	13	Fri, Sept 20	9:30 p.m. EDT	@ Edmonton Eskimos	W 30–27	10–3	TSN	Commonwealth Stadium	25,694	Recap
16	14	Fri, Sept 27	8:30 p.m. EDT	@ Winnipeg Blue Bombers	W 33–13	11–3	TSN/RDS2	IG Field	25,086	Recap
17	15	Fri, Oct 4	7:00 p.m. EDT	Edmonton Eskimos	W 42–12	12–3	TSN/ESPN2	Tim Hortons Field	23,411	Recap
18	Bye									
19	16	Sat, Oct 19	4:00 p.m. EDT	Ottawa Redblacks	W 33–12	13–3	TSN/RDS2	Tim Hortons Field	23,692	Recap
20	17	Sat, Oct 26	1:00 p.m. EDT	@ Montreal Alouettes	W 38–26	14–3	TSN/RDS	Molson Stadium	17,264	Recap
21	18	Sat, Nov 2	7:00 p.m. EDT	Toronto Argonauts	W 21–18	15–3	TSN	Tim Hortons Field	22,804	Recap

== Post-season ==
=== Schedule ===
Game	Date	Kickoff	Opponent	Results		TV	Venue	Attendance	Summary
Game	Date	Kickoff	Opponent	Score	Record	TV	Venue	Attendance	Summary
East Semi-Final	Bye								
East Final	Sun, Nov 17	1:00 p.m. EST	Edmonton Eskimos	W 36–16	1–0	TSN/RDS/ESPNews	Tim Hortons Field	25,177	Recap
107th Grey Cup	Sun, Nov 24	6:00 p.m. EST	Winnipeg Blue Bombers	L 12–33	1–1	TSN/RDS/ESPN2	McMahon Stadium	35,439	Recap

== Roster ==
Hamilton Tiger-Cats 2019 final roster
**Quarterbacks**: 9 Dane Evans; 3 Hayden Moore; 6 David Watford; **Running backs**: 29 Jackson Bennett; 1 Anthony Coombs; 20 Maleek Irons; 19 Tyrell Sutton; **Receivers**: 80 Jaelon Acklin; 86 Bralon Addison; 16 Brandon Banks; 81 Brian Jones; 12 Mike Jones; 84 Nikola Kalinic; 17 Luke Tasker; 15 Marcus Tucker	**Offensive linemen**: 60 Darius Ciraco G; 51 Mike Filer C; 67 Jesse Gibbon G; 61 Ryker Mathews T; 59 Kay Okafor G/T; 57 Brandon Revenberg G; 54 Chris Van Zeyl T; **Defensive linemen**: 56 Ja'Gared Davis DE; 99 David Dean DT; 77 Valentin Gnahoua DE; 95 Julian Howsare DE; 97 Ted Laurent DT; 94 Lorenzo Mauldin DE; 93 Connor McGough DE; 58 Brett Wade DT; 98 Dylan Wynn DT	**Linebackers**: 29 Tyrice Beverette; 11 Larry Dean; 21 Simoni Lawrence; 0 Rico Murray; 44 Curtis Newton; 22 Justin Tuggle; **Defensive backs**: 2 Tunde Adeleke; 24 Delvin Breaux; 26 Cariel Brooks; 35 Mike Daly; 30 Jay Langa; 4 Richard Leonard; 25 Jumal Rolle; 37 Frankie Williams	**Special teams**: 52 Aaron Crawford LS; 70 Lirim Hajrullahu K/P; **Practice roster**: 14 Gabriel Amavicza-Ortiz K; 13 Maurice Carnell DB; 34 Koron Crump LB; 18 Marcus Davis WR; 65 Brett Golding C; 40 Lucas Korol LB; 53 Sheriden Lawley DT; 41 Will Likely DB; 85 Justin Sumpter SB; 50 Joel Van Pelt DE	**Injured list**: 33 Chris Frey LB; 69 Mathieu Girard C; 27 Cameron Marshall RB; 7 Jalin Marshall WR; 8 Jeremiah Masoli QB; 32 Tevin Mitchel DB; 36 Jordan Moore LB; 23 Nick Shortill LB; 66 Trevon Tate T; 31 Sean Thomas Erlington RB; 5 Adrian Tracy DE; 83 David Ungerer WR; 55 Jamaal Westerman DE; Italics indicate American player **Bold** indicates global player

== Coaching staff ==
Hamilton Tiger-Cats Staff
Front office: Caretaker – Bob Young; Chief executive officer – Scott Mitchell; President and chief operating officer – Matt Afinec; Sr. Director of Personnel & Co-Manager of Football Operations – Drew Allemang; Sr. Director of Personnel & Co-Manager of Football Operations – Shawn Burke; Director of U.S. Scouting – Spencer Zimmerman; Football operations consultant – Jim Barker; Coordinator, U.S. Scouting – Rich Massaro; Coordinator, Canadian Scouting – Spencer Boehm; Video co-ordinator – Matt Allemang; Head coach: Head coach – Orlondo Steinauer; Offensive coaches: Offensive Coordinator & Wide Receivers – Tommy Condell; Offensive line – Dennis McKnight; Running backs – D. J. Harper; Assistant Wide Receivers & Offensive Quality Control – Jarryd Baines	Defensive coaches: Defensive Coordinator & Defensive Backs – Mark Washington; Defensive line – Randy Melvin; Linebackers – Robin Ross; Defensive backs assistant – Craig Butler; Special teams coaches: Special teams coordinator – Jeff Reinebold; Special teams assistant – Craig Butler; → Coaching staff
