= Mike Jones (wide receiver, born 1992) =

Canadian football player

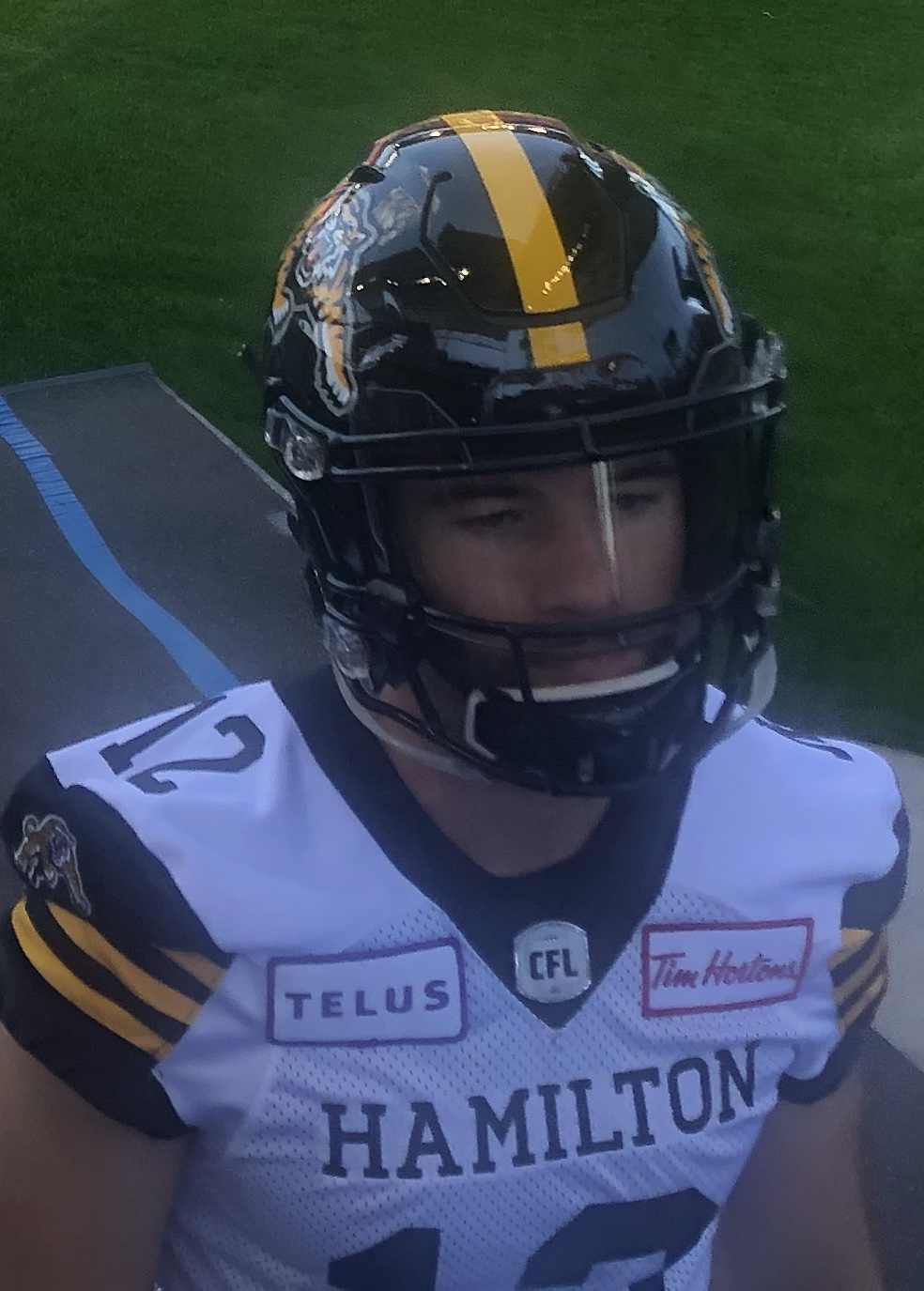
- Jones with the Hamilton Tiger-Cats in 2019

No. 85, 12, 80, 82
- Position: Wide receiver

Personal information
- Born: November 2, 1992 (age 34); Toronto, Ontario, Canada
- Listed height: 6 ft 0 in (1.83 m)
- Listed weight: 181 lb (82 kg)

Career information
- High school: James Earl Rudder
- College: Southern
- CFL draft: 2016: 3rd round, 18th overall pick

Career history
- 2016–2019: Hamilton Tiger-Cats
- 2021–2022: Edmonton Elks
- 2022: Hamilton Tiger-Cats
- 2022: Montreal Alouettes

Awards and highlights
- SWAC Champion – 2013

Career CFL statistics
- Receptions: 141
- Rec yards: 1,996
- Rec average: 14.2
- Rec touchdowns: 6
- Stats at CFL.ca

Mike Jones (born November 2, 1992) is a Canadian former professional football wide receiver who played in the Canadian Football League (CFL) for the Hamilton Tiger-Cats, Edmonton Elks, and Montreal Alouettes. He played college football with the Southern Jaguars from 2012 to 2015.

== College career ==
Jones played for four years in the Southern Jaguars football program, which included two SWAC West Division Titles. After minimal use his first season, Jones became a contributor in the offense and special teams. In 39 games played, Jones caught 49 passes for 919 yards and 6 touchdowns. As a returner, Jones had 16 kickoff returns for 237 yards, and his lone punt return went for 32 yards. His career highs in yards, touchdowns, and average yards per catch came during the 2013 season, which culminated in the Jaguars winning the 2013 SWAC Championship Game in double overtime. While attending Southern, Jones studied mass communications.

== Professional career ==
=== Hamilton Tiger-Cats (first stint) ===
Due to his Canadian citizenship, Jones was eligible to be drafted by Canadian Football League teams. He was drafted in the third round, 18th overall by the Hamilton Tiger-Cats in the 2016 CFL draft and he signed with the team on May 27, 2016. Jones was eased into the league during his rookie season by contributing as a special teamer, returning 6 kickoffs for 98 yards and one punt for 55 yards, as well as catching 2 passes on offense as a depth receiver. During the 2017 season, Jones' use on offense increased, although he was suspended for two games. In his first game back, Jones caught his first professional touchdown pass courtesy of a Jeremiah Masoli pass, and a June Jones challenge to overturn the call from incomplete to complete. The play occurred with Jones' 19-month-old son in attendance.

The 2018 season would be a breakout year for Jones, who developed a chemistry with now full-time starter and the Eastern Division's Most Outstanding Player candidate Masoli. Jones turned 49 catches into 841 yards and three scores, in addition to playing in his first playoff games, catching another touchdown. Jones' contributions were especially important to the Tiger-Cat's postseason goals given the season ending injuries to receivers Brandon Banks, Jalen Saunders, Chris Williams, and Terrence Toliver, as well as first overall draft pick Mark Chapman not reporting to the team. With a head coaching change and the emergence of Most Outstanding Rookie nominee Jaelon Acklin combined with the season ending injury to Masoli in 2019, Jones saw less use, but still provided quality depth for the Division Champion Tiger-cats who set the franchise record for wins in a season. During the 107th Grey Cup, Jones was unable to catch a deep pass, suffering an injury which turned out to be a torn labrum; despite the injury, Jones finished the game, a Ti-Cats loss. The defender in coverage was ironically also named Mike Jones, who had also caused the injury to Brandon Banks earlier in the game.

=== Edmonton Elks ===
Jones became a free agent in February 2020, and signed with the Edmonton Football Team on January 4, 2021. In his first year with the club he caught 29 passes for 394 yards with two touchdowns. In his second year in Edmonton in seven games Jones only caught 8 of 21 pass attempts for 100 yards. Jones and 10 other players were released by the Elks on July 29, 2022; midway through the 2022 season.

=== Hamilton Tiger-Cats (second stint) ===
Only a few days after being released by the Elks Jones signed with the Tiger-Cats on August 2, 2022. In his first game back with the team on August 6, 2022, he recorded three catches for 30 yards before being placed on the team's practice roster shortly after. He was later released on September 7, 2022.

=== Montreal Alouettes ===
On September 21, 2022, Jones signed a practice roster agreement with the Montreal Alouettes. He was promoted to the active roster on October 20, and placed on injured reserve on November 5, 2022. Overall, he dressed in two games, starting one, for the Alouettes in 2022 but did not record any statistics.

== Career statistics ==
Receiving		Regular season						Playoffs
Year	Team	Games	Rec.	Yards	Avg	Long	TD	Games	Rec.	Yards	Avg	Long	TD
2016	HAM	8	2	27	13.5	21	0	Inactive
2017	HAM	14	28	285	10.2	49	1	Team did not qualify
2018	HAM	18	49	841	17.2	84	3	2	6	71	11.8	37	1
2019	HAM	18	22	319	14.5	59	0	2	1	10	10.0	10	0
2021	EDM	11	29	394	13.6	52	2	Team did not qualify
2022	EDM	7	21	100	12.5	19	0
2022	HAM	1	3	30	10.0	0	0
CFL totals		77	141	1,996	14.2	84	6	4	7	81	11.6	37	1

== Coaching career ==
=== Langham Creek High School ===
In August 2023, Jones began his coaching career at Langham Creek High School in Texas, where he served as the tight ends coach and assisted with boys’ track and field. During his time there, he helped develop tight end Jordan Washington, who later signed with the University of Texas. In 2024, Jones transitioned to wide receivers coach while also taking on the role of head boys’ track coach.

=== Waller High School ===
In August 2025, Jones joined the coaching staff at Waller High School. He currently serves as the wide receivers coach and assistant basketball coach.
