= 2019 Winnipeg Blue Bombers season =

Canadian football team season

- General manager: Kyle Walters
- Head coach: Mike O'Shea
- Home stadium: IG Field

Results
- Record: 11–7
- Division place: 3rd, West
- Playoffs: Won Grey Cup
- Team MOP: Willie Jefferson
- Team MOC: Mike Miller
- Team MOR: Kenny Lawler

Uniform
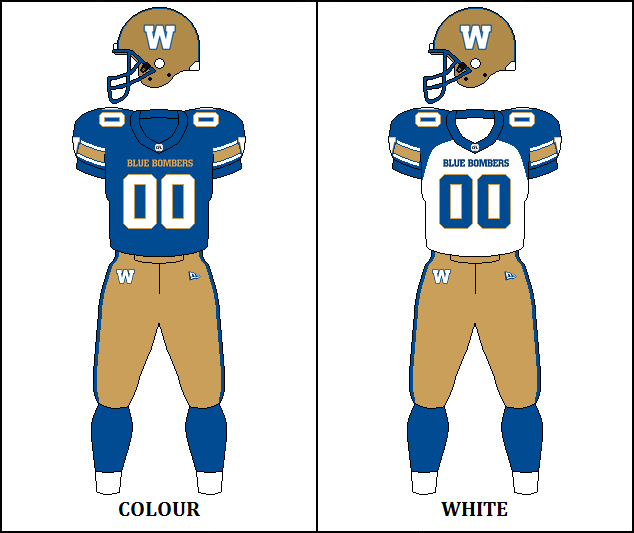

The 2019 Winnipeg Blue Bombers season was the 62nd season for the team in the Canadian Football League (CFL) and their 87th season overall. This was the sixth season under head coach Mike O'Shea and the sixth full season under general manager Kyle Walters. The Blue Bombers qualified for the playoffs for the fourth consecutive season on September 21, 2019, following a Montreal Alouettes loss. The club later would go on to win their 11th Grey Cup championship and their first since the 1990 Grey Cup championship game, ending what was the longest active Grey Cup drought.

== Offseason ==
=== Foreign drafts ===
For the first time in its history, the CFL held drafts for foreign players from Mexico and Europe. Like all other CFL teams, the Blue Bombers held three non-tradeable selections in the 2019 CFL–LFA draft, which took place on January 14, 2019. The 2019 European CFL draft took place on April 11, 2019, where all teams held one non-tradeable pick.

Draft	Round	Pick	Player	Position	School/Club team
LFA	1	8	Sergio Schiaffino	RB	Dinos de Saltillo
LFA	2	17	Manuel Hernández	S	UDLAP
LFA	3	26	Gabriel Amavizca	K	BUAP
Euro	1	2	Thiadric Hansen	LB	Potsdam Royals

=== CFL draft ===
The 2019 CFL draft took place on May 2, 2019. The Blue Bombers held nine selections in the eight-round draft after acquiring the BC Lions' first-round pick in a trade which included their own first-round pick from the 2018 CFL draft.

Round	Pick	Player	Position	School	Hometown
1	4	Drew Desjarlais	OL	Windsor	Belle River, ON
1	5	Jonathan Kongbo	DL	Tennessee	Surrey, BC
2	14	Brady Oliveira	RB	North Dakota	Winnipeg, MB
3	25	Connor Griffiths	DL	British Columbia	Langley, BC
4	34	Asotui Eli	OL	Hawai'i	Kailua-Kona, HI
5	43	Malik Richards	WR	Mount Allison	Brampton, ON
6	52	Tariq Lachance	DL	Manitoba	Winnipeg, MB
7	61	Nick Hallett	DB	Toronto	London, ON
8	70	Kerfalla Exumé	DB	Montreal	Montreal, QC

== Preseason ==
=== Schedule ===
Week	Date	Kickoff	Opponent	Results		TV	Venue	Attendance	Summary
Week	Date	Kickoff	Opponent	Score	Record	TV	Venue	Attendance	Summary
A	Bye								
B	Fri, May 31	7:30 p.m. CDT	vs. Edmonton Eskimos	W 20–3	1–0	None	IG Field	19,273	Recap
C	Thu, June 6	8:00 p.m. CDT	at Saskatchewan Roughriders	W 35–29	2–0	None	Mosaic Stadium	28,706	Recap

== Regular season ==
=== Standings ===
West Division
Team	GP	W	L	T	Pts	PF	PA	Div	Stk	
Saskatchewan Roughriders	18	13	5	0	26	487	386	7–3	W3	Details
Calgary Stampeders	18	12	6	0	24	482	407	8–2	W1	Details
Winnipeg Blue Bombers	18	11	7	0	22	508	409	7–3	W1	Details
Edmonton Eskimos	18	8	10	0	16	406	400	3–7	L2	Details
BC Lions	18	5	13	0	10	411	452	0–10	L3	Details

=== Schedule ===
Week	Game	Date	Kickoff	Opponent	Results		TV	Venue	Attendance	Summary
Week	Game	Date	Kickoff	Opponent	Score	Record	TV	Venue	Attendance	Summary
1	1	Sat, June 15	9:00 p.m. CDT	at BC Lions	W 33–23	1–0	TSN/ESPN2	BC Place	18,058	Recap
2	Bye									
3	2	Thu, June 27	7:30 p.m. CDT	vs. Edmonton Eskimos	W 28–21	2–0	TSN/RDS/ESPN2	IG Field	25,336	Recap
4	3	Fri, July 5	6:30 p.m. CDT	at Ottawa Redblacks	W 29–14	3–0	TSN/RDS	TD Place Stadium	20,429	Recap
5	4	Fri, July 12	7:30 p.m. CDT	vs. Toronto Argonauts	W 48–21	4–0	TSN/RDS	IG Field	24,187	Recap
6	5	Fri, July 19	7:30 p.m. CDT	vs. Ottawa Redblacks	W 31–1	5–0	TSN/RDS	IG Field	25,350	Recap
7	6	Fri, July 26	6:00 p.m. CDT	at Hamilton Tiger-Cats	L 15–23	5–1	TSN/RDS	Tim Hortons Field	23,512	Recap
8	7	Thu, Aug 1	6:00 p.m. CDT	at Toronto Argonauts	L 27–28	5–2	TSN/RDS/ESPN2	BMO Field	12,072	Recap
9	8	Thu, Aug 8	7:30 p.m. CDT	vs. Calgary Stampeders	W 26–24	6–2	TSN/RDS	IG Field	25,354	Recap
10	9	Thu, Aug 15	7:30 p.m. CDT	vs. BC Lions	W 32–16	7–2	TSN/RDS2	IG Field	24,914	Recap
11	10	Fri, Aug 23	8:00 p.m. CDT	at Edmonton Eskimos	W 34–28	8–2	TSN/ESPN2	Commonwealth Stadium	34,217	Recap
12	11	Sun, Sept 1	2:00 p.m. CDT	at Saskatchewan Roughriders	L 17–19	8–3	TSN	Mosaic Stadium	33,356	Recap
13	12	Sat, Sept 7	3:00 p.m. CDT	vs. Saskatchewan Roughriders	W 35–10	9–3	TSN	IG Field	33,134	Recap
14	Bye									
15	13	Sat, Sept 21	3:00 p.m. CDT	at Montreal Alouettes	L 37–38	9–4	TSN/RDS	Molson Stadium	19,070	Recap
16	14	Fri, Sept 27	7:30 p.m. CDT	vs. Hamilton Tiger-Cats	L 13–33	9–5	TSN/RDS2	IG Field	25,086	Recap
17	15	Sat, Oct 5	6:00 p.m. CDT	at Saskatchewan Roughriders	L 6–21	9–6	TSN	Mosaic Stadium	31,080	Recap
18	16	Sat, Oct 12	3:00 p.m. CDT	vs. Montreal Alouettes	W 35–24	10–6	TSN/RDS	IG Field	20,907	Recap
19	17	Sat, Oct 19	6:00 p.m. CDT	at Calgary Stampeders	L 33–37	10–7	TSN	McMahon Stadium	26,885	Recap
20	18	Fri, Oct 25	7:30 p.m. CDT	vs. Calgary Stampeders	W 29–28	11–7	TSN	IG Field	24,460	Recap
21	Bye									

== Post-season ==
=== Schedule ===
Game	Date	Kickoff	Opponent	Results		TV	Venue	Attendance	Summary
Game	Date	Kickoff	Opponent	Score	Record	TV	Venue	Attendance	Summary
West Semi-Final	Sun, Nov 10	3:30 p.m. CST	at Calgary Stampeders	W 35–14	1–0	TSN/RDS/ESPN2	McMahon Stadium	24,278	Recap
West Final	Sun, Nov 17	3:30 p.m. CST	at Saskatchewan Roughriders	W 20–13	2–0	TSN/RDS/ESPN2	Mosaic Stadium	33,300	Recap
107th Grey Cup	Sun, Nov 24	5:00 p.m. CST	Hamilton Tiger-Cats	W 33–12	3–0	TSN/RDS/ESPN2	McMahon Stadium	35,439	Recap

== Roster ==
2019 Winnipeg Blue Bombers final roster
**Quarterbacks**: 8 Zach Collaros; 12 Sean McGuire; 17 Chris Streveler; **Running backs**: 27 Johnny Augustine; 33 Andrew Harris; 24 Mike Miller; 32 John Rush; **Receivers**: 1 Darvin Adams; 88 Rasheed Bailey; 10 Nic Demski; 80 Janarion Grant; 89 Kenny Lawler; 81 Daniel Petermann; 82 Drew Wolitarsky	**Offensive linemen**: 66 Stanley Bryant T; 61 Drew Desjarlais G; 67 Asotui Eli C; 51 Jermarcus Hardrick T; 53 Patrick Neufeld G; 62 Cody Speller G/C; **Defensive linemen**: 3 Thiadric Hansen DE; 94 Jackson Jeffcoat DE; 5 Willie Jefferson DE; 2 Jonathan Kongbo DE; 92 Drake Nevis DT; 98 Steven Richardson DT; 95 Jake Thomas DT; **Special teams**: 9 Justin Medlock K/P; 46 Chad Rempel LS	**Linebackers**: 4 Adam Bighill; 34 Jesse Briggs; 44 Shayne Gauthier; 45 Korey Jones; 52 Thomas Miles; 19 Kyrie Wilson; **Defensive backs**: 37 Brandon Alexander; 41 Kerfalla Exumé; 22 Chandler Fenner; 21 Nick Hallett; 29 Jeff Hecht; 0 Derek Jones; 16 Mike Jones; 36 Mercy Maston; 30 Winston Rose; 14 Marcus Sayles; 25 Nick Taylor	**Practice roster**: 48 Nate Brisson-Fast DT; 38 Manuel Hernández Reyes LB; 35 Trey Johnson DB; 49 David Kenney DE; 18 Trevor Knight QB; 97 Meffy Koloamatangi DE; 39 Marcus Rios DB; 47 Jordan Robinson RB; 26 Sergio Schiaffino DB; 86 Kenny Walker SB; 84 Malcolm Williams WR; 40 Dondre Wright DB	**Injured list**: 43 Brandon Calver LB; 59 Michael Couture C; 23 Anthony Gaitor DB; 68 Geoff Gray G; 91 Connor Griffiths DT; 31 Dexter Janke LB; 58 Maxime Latour LS; 6 Charles Nelson SB; 15 Matt Nichols QB; 20 Brady Oliveira RB; 93 Craig Roh DE; 7 Lucky Whitehead WR; 65 Darrell Williams T; Italics indicate American players **Bold** indicates Global players

== Coaching staff ==
Winnipeg Blue Bombers Staff
Front office: Owner – Community owned (non-profit corporation owned by members); Chairperson of the board of governors – Brock Bulbuck; President/CEO – Wade Miller; General manager of football operations – Kyle Walters; Assistant General Manager / Director of U.S. Scouting – Danny McManus; Assistant general manager / director of player personnel – Ted Goveia; National scout – Craig Smith; Team services coordinator – Matt Gulakow; Head equipment manager – Brad Fotty; Assistant equipment manager – Kevin Todd; Assistant equipment manager – Jared Cronk; Video coordinator – Colin Thurston	Head coaches: Head coach – Mike O'Shea; Offensive coaches: Offensive coordinator/receivers – Paul LaPolice; Quarterbacks – Buck Pierce; Running backs – Kevin Bourgoin; Offensive line – Marty Costello; Defensive coaches: Defensive coordinator – Richie Hall; Defensive line & linebackers – Glen Young; Defensive backs – Jordan Younger; Special teams coaches: Special teams coordinator – Paul Boudreau; → Coaching staff
