= 107th Grey Cup =

2019 Canadian Football championship game

Hamilton Tiger-Cats	Winnipeg Blue Bombers
(15–3)	(11–7)
12	33
Head coach: Orlondo Steinauer	Head coach: Mike O'Shea
	1	2	3	4	Total
Hamilton Tiger-Cats	3	3	6	0	12
Winnipeg Blue Bombers	8	13	6	6	33
- Date: November 24, 2019
- Stadium: McMahon Stadium
- Location: Calgary
- Most Valuable Player: Andrew Harris, RB (Blue Bombers)
- Most Valuable Canadian: Andrew Harris, RB (Blue Bombers)
- Favourite: Tiger-Cats by 3.5
- National anthem: Lindsey Kelly with the Calgary Stampede Showband
- Coin toss: Lois Mitchell
- Referee: André Proulx
- Halftime show: Keith Urban
- Attendance: 35,440

Broadcasters
- Network: English: TSN; French: RDS; United States: ESPN2; Mexico: MVS; UK/Ireland: BT Sport
- Announcers: Chris Cuthbert (Note: This ended up being Chris Cuthbert's final Grey Cup as play-by-play man. He would later leave TSN in Summer 2020 to join Sportsnet.) (play-by-play); Glen Suitor (analyst); Sara Orlesky (sideline reporter); Matthew Scianitti (sideline reporter)
- Ratings: 3.9 million (average); 9 million (total)

The 107th Grey Cup decided the champion of the 2019 season in the Canadian Football League (CFL). The match was played on November 24, 2019, between the Winnipeg Blue Bombers and the Hamilton Tiger-Cats at McMahon Stadium in Calgary, Alberta. Winnipeg defeated Hamilton, 33–12. This was the Blue Bombers' first Grey Cup victory since 1990 (and first as a West Division team since 1984, after two victories as an East Division team), ending one of the longest championship droughts in CFL history. Winnipeg's Andrew Harris was named both Most Valuable Player and Most Valuable Canadian of the game, which was the first time a player had won both honours in the same game.

== Date ==
On November 24, 2017, at the CFL's State of the League address, League Commissioner Randy Ambrosie stated that he explored the possibility of having the Grey Cup during the third week of October. Reasons in favour of this were the weather being warmer in October as well as a potential television deal with the American-based NFL Network. Reasons against would be the increased overlap of the National Hockey League's Stanley Cup playoffs in May and June (since the season would also have to start one month earlier) as well as the CFL's playoffs overlapping Major League Baseball's playoffs in October. It was ultimately scheduled for its usual date (fourth Sunday of November) and took place on November 24, 2019.

== Host city ==
Leading up to the formal announcement, the Hamilton Tiger-Cats and the Calgary Stampeders were the only clubs that publicly expressed interest in hosting the game. The Tiger-Cats' stadium, Tim Hortons Field, was completed in 2014, but the city of Hamilton had not hosted a Grey Cup since the 84th Grey Cup in 1996. The main obstacle had been that multiple levels of government and the Tiger-Cats themselves have filed lawsuits against the construction firm due to the stadium construction delays and ongoing maintenance issues with the stadium itself. The club would also need support from Hamilton City Council. Temporary seating would have to be installed with the goal to raise seating capacity to 40,000. Tiger-Cats CEO, Scott Mitchell, had said that the team wanted to host this game in particular since it coincides with the 150th anniversary of the original Hamilton Football Club.

At the 2018 CFL Week, it was reported that the Stampeders were the most likely host of the game. The team's president and general manager, John Hufnagel, confirmed that they had made a bid. The speculation was confirmed on April 25, 2018, in a formal announcement that Calgary had won the rights to host the game. It marked the second time that the province of Alberta hosted the Grey Cup in consecutive years, with Edmonton hosting the year prior (the two cities also hosted back-to-back games in 2009 and 2010). It was the fifth time that Calgary hosted the Grey Cup, the last time having been the 97th Grey Cup in 2009.

=== Grey Cup Festival ===
The Grey Cup Festival ran from November 20 to 23 and was centred around downtown Calgary and the facilities in Stampede Park. Over forty events were scheduled to take place over the four-day festival, including a family-friendly street festival, pancake breakfasts, and the traditional team parties. Unique events to this year's festival included the Grey Cup Rodeo, which was held at the Stampede Corral, and the Fusion Music Festival, which included such musical acts as Fetty Wap, Brett Kissel, and Nervo.

Despite the hometown Calgary Stampeders losing to the Winnipeg Blue Bombers in the Western Semi-Final, organizers anticipated that the festival will generate a direct economic boom of approximately $40 million for the city of Calgary.

== Background ==
The 107th Grey Cup featured the only two teams who had not won the Grey Cup since 2000. The Tiger-Cats, who came into the game having won the Grey Cup most recently in 1999, were facing off against the Blue Bombers, who had won most recently in 1990 (when the team competed in the East Division).

=== Winnipeg Blue Bombers ===
The Blue Bombers finished third in the West Division with a regular season record of 11–7. The Bombers had a tumultuous season, compiling an 8–2 record over the first half of the season before going 3–5 over their remaining eight games. In week 20 of the season, Bombers running back Andrew Harris broke the record for most career rushing yards by a Canadian in the CFL, surpassing Hall of Famer Norm Kwong. The Bombers were led into the playoffs by quarterback Zach Collaros, who played his first game for the team in the second last week of the season following injuries to Matt Nichols and Chris Streveler.

In the first round of the playoffs, the Bombers travelled to Calgary to play the second-place Calgary Stampeders. The Bombers defeated the Stampeders 35–14 after a strong second half in which they scored 27 points and held the home team scoreless. The following Sunday, November 17, the Bombers played the Western Final against the local rivals Saskatchewan Roughriders at Mosaic Stadium in Regina. The Bombers defeated the Riders 20–13 to win the Western Division for the first time since 1984. The Bombers had previously made seven Grey Cup appearances as an Eastern team from 1987 to 2013, winning in 1988 and 1990.

=== Hamilton Tiger-Cats ===
The Tiger-Cats ended the regular season with a league-best 15–3 record, setting a franchise record for wins in a season and placing first in the East Division. The Tiger-Cats finished the regular season undefeated at home, for the first time in their history, with a record of 9–0 at Tim Hortons Field. The Tiger-Cats ended the season on a six-game winning streak, the first time they had done so since 1972. For most of the year, the team was led by rookie quarterback Dane Evans after starter Jeremiah Masoli suffered a season-ending leg injury in the seventh game of the season.

As the first place team in the East Division, the Tiger-Cats received a bye in the first round of the playoffs and hosted the Eastern Final on November 17 against the crossover Edmonton Eskimos. The Tiger-Cats won the game 36–16 to become the Eastern Division champions for the first time since 2014.

=== Head-to-head ===
Winnipeg and Hamilton met twice during the 2019 regular season, with the Tiger-Cats winning both games. The first game took place in Hamilton in week 7, where the Tiger-Cats won 23–15 despite losing starting quarterback Jeremiah Masoli to injury in the first quarter. The two teams did not meet again until week 16 in Winnipeg, where the Tiger-Cats won 33–13, breaking a six-game unbeaten streak for the Bombers at IG Field.

These two teams had not met in the Grey Cup since 1984, and this was only the second time since 1965. Of the eight previous Grey Cup meetings, seven came in a thirteen-season span between 1953 and 1965 and the Blue Bombers won five of those eight games. Since their previous Grey Cup matchup, the two teams have met seven times in the East Division playoffs, during Winnipeg's three separate periods as an Eastern team. The Blue Bombers won six of those seven playoff games.

The combined Grey Cup drought of 49 seasons of play between the two teams is the longest in modern CFL and Grey Cup history. (Note: While the Saskatchewan Roughriders were founded in 1910 and did not win the Grey Cup until 1966, their initial Grey Cup drought was 42 seasons of play. This is because Western teams were not allowed to compete for the trophy until 1921 and the Grey Cup was suspended for three seasons during World War II. Thus, combined with the Ottawa Rough Riders' then-five season drought entering the 54th Grey Cup the combined Grey Cup championship drought for that game was 47 seasons - two less than the 107th Grey Cup.)

=== Uniforms ===
As the West Division representative in a Grey Cup held in a West Division city, the Blue Bombers were the designated home team for the game. However, the club elected to wear their road uniforms rather than their home versions after upsetting both the Calgary Stampeders and Saskatchewan Roughriders on the road. The Tiger-Cats then chose to wear their black jerseys with black pants; a combination that was worn three times during the regular season. Both teams wore the same uniforms during the entirety of their post-season runs (Winnipeg for three games and Hamilton for two).

== Game summary ==
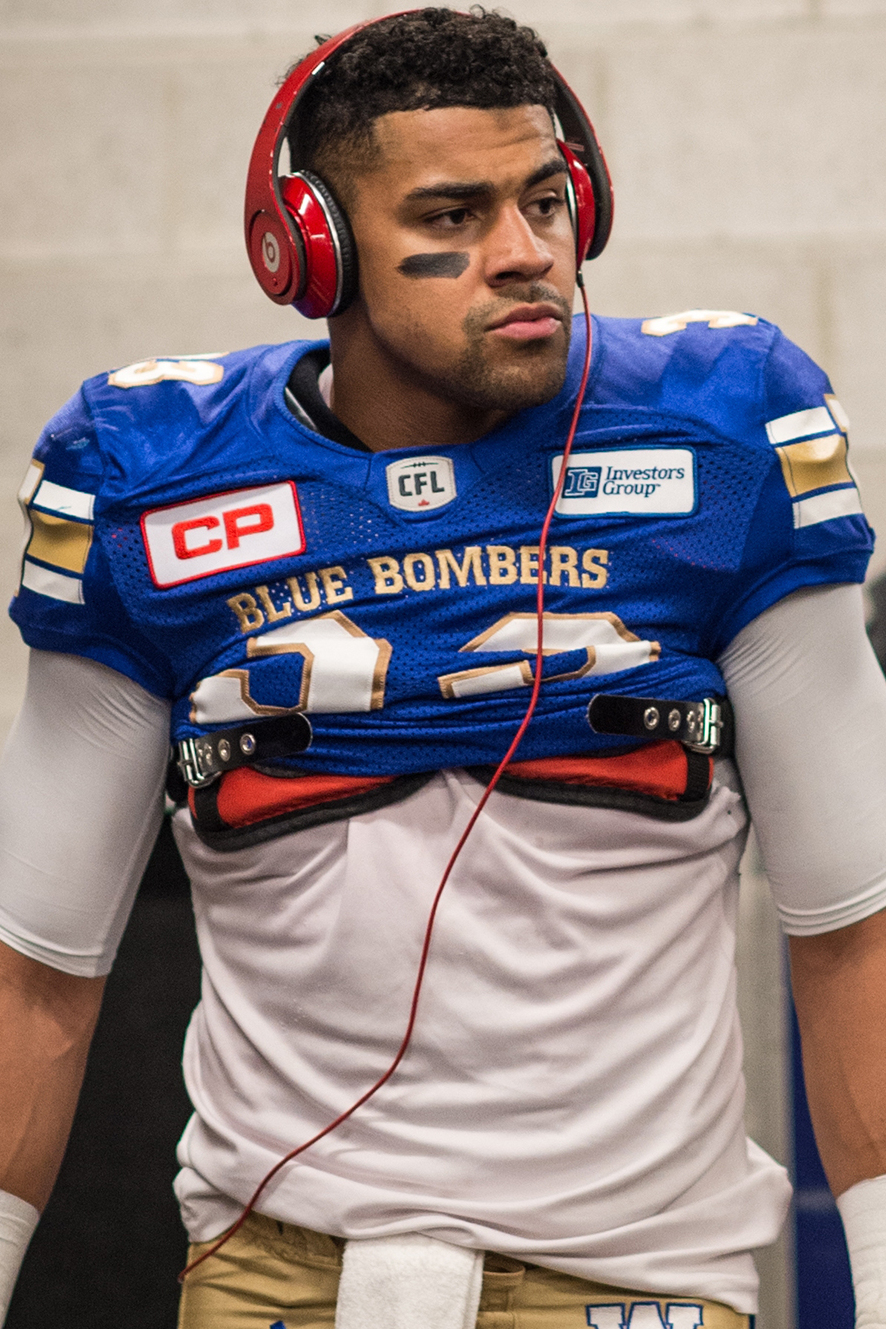
Andrew Harris had 170 yards from scrimmage and two touchdowns in the game.

The Winnipeg defence started the game well, forcing two turnovers in the first five minutes of game time. The second turnover was a Willie Jefferson quarterback sack that caused Dane Evans to fumble, losing 35 yards. This led to an Andrew Harris rushing touchdown on the next play, giving the Blue Bombers a 7–0 lead. Hamilton moved down the field quickly with two long catch-and-runs by Brandon Banks, but a pair of unsuccessful running plays limited them to a field goal, cutting the lead to 7–3. The Bombers immediately answered with a high 30-yard toss from Zach Collaros to Kenny Lawler, but the drive ended with an unsuccessful 48-yard field goal attempt which scored one point. A promising Tiger-Cats drive was ended by David Watford failing a 3rd-and-1 quarterback sneak. This ended the first quarter, with the score 8–3 for Winnipeg. The teams traded field goals in the first part of the second quarter to make the score 11–6. Hamilton's Lirim Hajrullahu had a 46-yard punt returned 32 yards by Janarion Grant, leaving the Bombers with good field position. They were able to take advantage, with Harris providing 40 of the drive's 50 yards in two plays, including receiving a touchdown to make the score 18–6. The half ended with a short Justin Medlock field goal for Winnipeg, extending their lead to 21–6.

The Blue Bombers began the second half by running down almost four minutes of game time, followed by a 39-yard field goal to make it 24–6. The Tiger-Cats attempted to respond, but on reaching the opposing 25-yard line were again halted by the Winnipeg defence, who forced another turnover on downs. However, Winnipeg went two-and-out. Hamilton capitalized with an eight-play touchdown drive, but missed the two-point conversion to leave the score 24–12. With three minutes left in the quarter, the Bombers moved quickly down the field with a Drew Wolitarsky 45-yard catch-and-run play, leading to another field goal and a score of 27–12.

Two touchdowns behind, Hamilton had no success in the fourth quarter. They were forced to punt after a 47-yard pass to Mike Jones (Hamilton receiver) inside the 10 yard line was knocked away by Mike Jones (Winnipeg defensive back). Winnipeg took six minutes off the clock with an 80-yard drive down the field which appeared to score a touchdown, but was overturned after television review. They settled for a field goal and a 30–12 lead with only 6:12 to go. The Blue Bombers defence then did its part, sacking Evans on the next two plays for two fumbles and another turnover. Winnipeg took possession and scored another field goal, giving them a 33–12 lead. With this goal, Justin Medlock tied the Grey Cup records for field goals made (6) and attempted (7) in a single game. Winnipeg had scored points on seven of their last eight possessions. The game ended without further incident, giving Winnipeg a 33–12 victory.

Blue Bombers running back Andrew Harris was named the game's Most Valuable Player and also received the Dick Suderman Trophy as the game's Most Valuable Canadian, the first time a single player had won both awards.

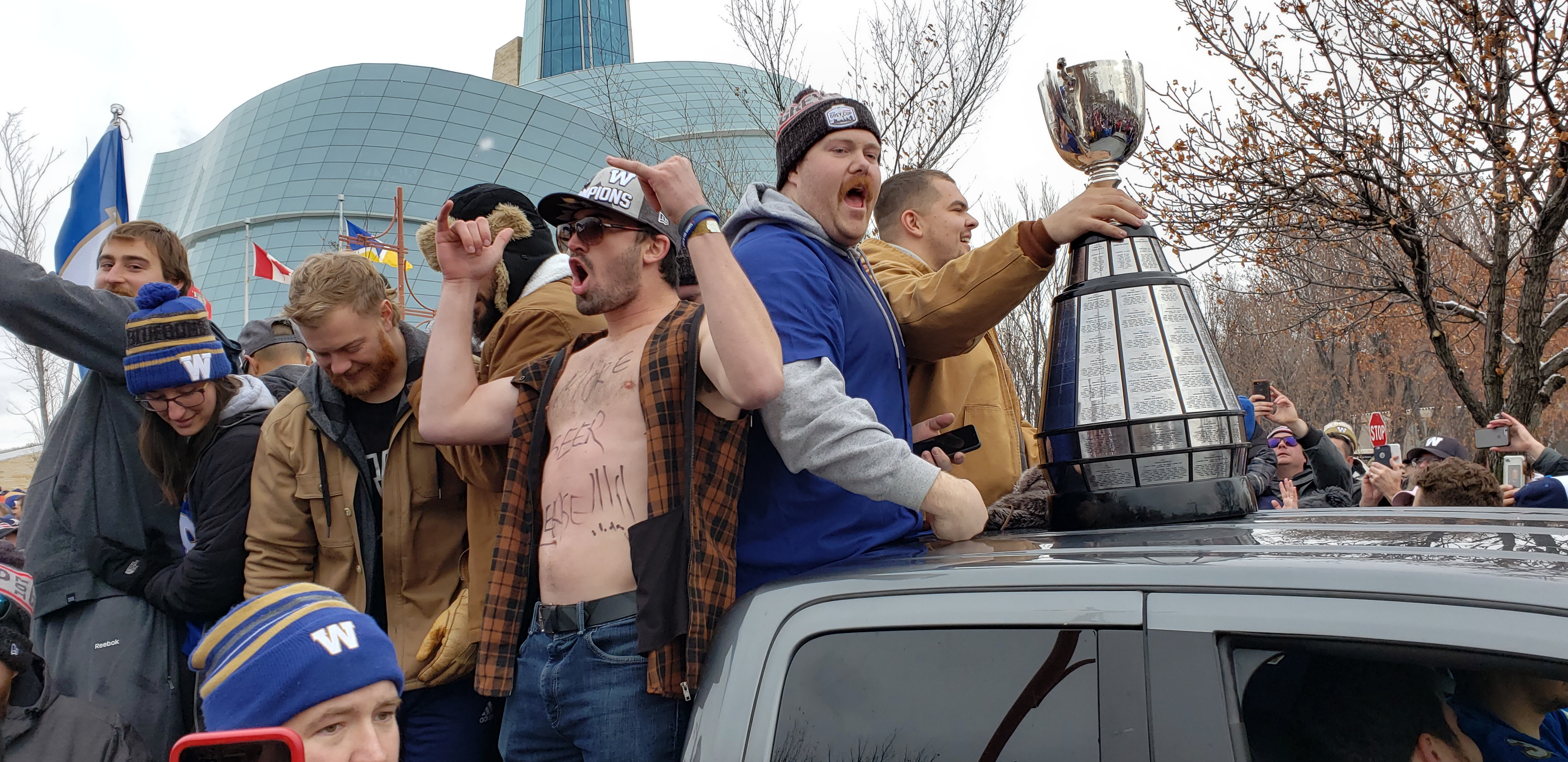
Blue Bomber players during the Grey Cup parade.

=== Scoring summary ===
First quarter

WPG – TD Harris 15 yard run (Medlock convert) (11:37) 7–0 WPG
HAM – FG Hajrullahu 44 yards (8:42) 7–3 WPG
WPG – Single Medlock (6:18) 8–3 WPG

Second quarter

HAM – FG Hajrullahu 47 yards (14:32) 8–6 WPG
WPG – FG Medlock 45 yards (10:05) 11–6 WPG
WPG – TD Harris 18 yard reception from Chris Streveler (Medlock convert) (6:26) 18–6 WPG
WPG – FG Medlock 17 yards (00:34) 21–6 WPG

Third quarter

WPG – FG Medlock 39 yards (11:12) 24–6 WPG
HAM – TD Addison 4 yard reception (incomplete two-point convert) (3:17) 24–12 WPG
WPG – FG Medlock 41 yards (00:03) 27–12 WPG

Fourth quarter

WPG – FG Medlock 17 yards (6:33) 30–12 WPG
WPG – FG Medlock 18 yards (3:00) 33–12 WPG

=== Individual statistics ===
Sources: CFL 107th Grey Cup Boxscore

Blue Bombers passing
	CP/AT	Pct	Yards	TD	Int
Zach Collaros	17/23	73.9%	170	0	0
Chris Streveler	3/3	100%	39	1	0
Darvin Adams	1/1	100%	13	0	0
Blue Bombers rushing
	Car	Yards	Avg	Lg	TD
Andrew Harris	18	134	7.4	26	1
Chris Streveler	9	30	3.3	5	0
Nic Demski	1	22	22.0	22	0
Blue Bombers receiving
	Rec	Yards	Avg	Lg	TD
Kenny Lawler	3	52	17.3	30	0
Nic Demski	4	45	11.2	31	0
Drew Wolitarsky	3	40	13.3	26	0
Andrew Harris	5	35	7.0	18	1
Rasheed Bailey	2	15	7.5	11	0
Chris Streveler	1	13	13.0	13	0
Darvin Adams	2	11	5.5	8	0
Janarion Grant	1	11	11.0	11	0
Blue Bombers defence
	DT–ST	QS	Int	FR	FF
Marcus Sayles	6–0	0	0	0	0
Mercy Maston	5–0	0	0	0	0
Kyrie Wilson	5–0	0	0	0	0
Jackson Jeffcoat	4–0	2	0	1	1
Adam Bighill	4–0	0	0	1	0
Mike Jones	4–1	0	1	0	0
Winston Rose	3–0	0	0	0	0
Willie Jefferson	2–0	3	0	0	2
Brandon Alexander	2–0	0	1	0	0
Steven Richardson	2–0	0	0	0	0
Drake Nevis	1–0	1	0	0	0
Jesse Briggs	1–1	0	0	0	0
Nick Taylor	1–0	0	0	0	0
Jake Thomas	1–0	0	0	0	0
Derek Jones	0–2	0	0	0	0
Mike Miller	0–1	0	0	0	0
Korey Jones	0–1	0	0	0	0
Shayne Gauthier	0–1	0	0	0	0
Johnny Augustine	0–1	0	0	0	0
Thiadric Hansen	0–1	0	0	0	0
Blue Bombers placekicking
Player	FM–FA	Lng	Avg	Sng	CM-CA
Justin Medlock	6–7	45	29.5	1	2–2
Blue Bombers punting
Player	No	GAv	NAv	Sng	Lng
Justin Medlock	3	44.3	30.3	0	45

Tiger-Cats passing
	CP/AT	Pct	Yards	TD	Int
Dane Evans	16/27	59.3%	203	1	2
Lirim Hajrullahu	1/1	100%	12	0	0
Tiger-Cats rushing
	Car	Yards	Avg	Lg	TD
Tyrell Sutton	11	86	7.8	22	0
Bralon Addison	4	45	11.2	14	0
Dane Evans	4	12	3.0	6	0
David Watford	1	1	1.0	1	0
Brandon Banks	1	-4	-4.0	-4	0
Tiger-Cats receiving
	Rec	Yards	Avg	Lg	TD
Jaelon Acklin	5	88	17.6	35	0
Brandon Banks	6	72	12.0	26	0
Bralon Addison	3	30	10.0	15	1
Luke Tasker	1	12	12.0	12	0
Mike Jones	1	10	10.0	10	0
Tyrell Sutton	1	3	3.0	3	0
Tiger-Cats defence
	DT–ST	QS	Int	FR	FF
Cariel Brooks	6–0	0	0	0	0
Tunde Adeleke	6–0	0	0	0	0
Simoni Lawrence	5–0	1	0	0	0
Ja'Gared Davis	5–0	0	0	0	0
Richard Leonard	4–0	0	0	0	0
Justin Tuggle	4–0	0	0	0	0
Frankie Williams	4–0	0	0	0	0
Lorenzo Mauldin	3–0	0	0	0	0
Dylan Wynn	3–0	0	0	0	0
Delvin Breaux	3–0	0	0	0	0
Rico Murray	2–0	0	0	0	0
Ryker Mathews	1–0	0	0	0	0
Jaelon Acklin	1–0	0	0	0	0
Julian Howsare	1–0	0	0	0	0
Luke Tasker	1–0	0	0	0	0
Chris Van Zeyl	1–0	0	0	0	0
Mike Daly	0–1	0	0	0	0
Curtis Newton	0–1	0	0	0	0
Connor McGough	0–1	0	0	0	0
Nikola Kalinic	0–1	0	0	0	0
Maleek Irons	0–1	0	0	0	0
Tiger-Cats placekicking
Player	FM–FA	Lng	Avg	Sng	CM-CA
Lirim Hajrullahu	2–2	47	45.5	0	0–0
Tiger-Cats punting
Player	No	GAv	NAv	Sng	Lng
Lirim Hajrullahu	3	39.7	26.3	0	46

== Depth charts ==
The following diagrams illustrate the teams' depth charts that were released one day prior to game day. Starters are listed in boxes in their respective positions with backups listed directly above or below. As per CFL rules, 45 of the 46 players for each team dressed in the game, with Winnipeg's Chandler Fenner and Hamilton's Marcus Tucker being the teams' game day scratches.

=== Winnipeg Blue Bombers ===
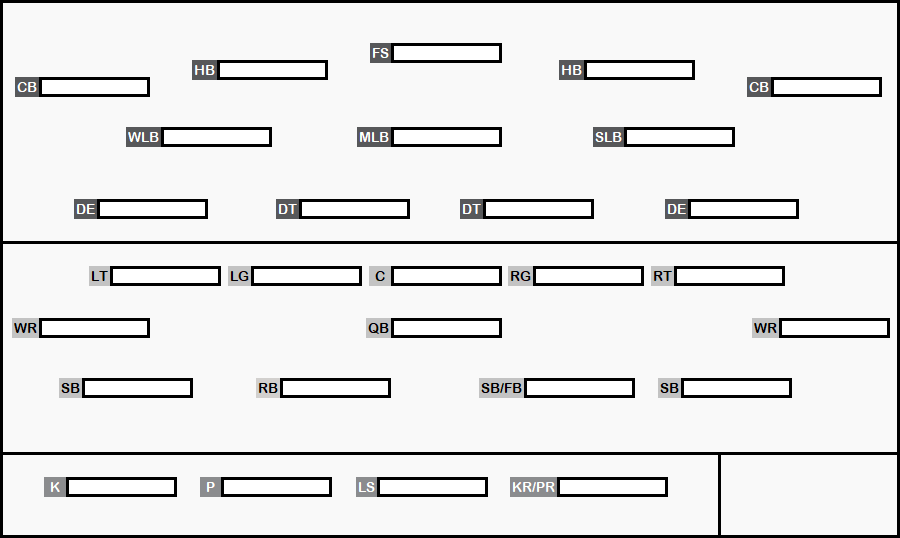

=== Hamilton Tiger-Cats ===
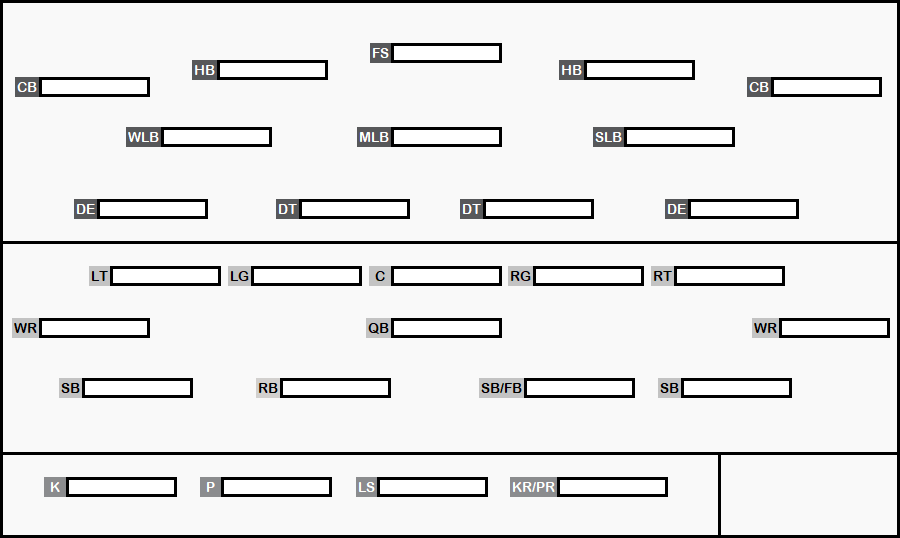

== Broadcasting ==
The game was televised in Canada by TSN (English) and RDS (French), in the United States on ESPN2, in the United Kingdom by BT Sport, and in Mexico by MVS. Outside of North America, the Grey Cup was broadcast by ESPN International and its affiliated networks to 74 countries.

The game was also available for online streaming for international viewers (outside of Canada, the United States, and the United Kingdom) through the CFL's streaming platform, in Canada through the TV Everywhere system TSN Go and in the United States via ESPN's TV Everywhere system.

TSN Radio stations, including Tiger-Cats flagship CKOC and Winnipeg's CFRW (replacing game coverage on CJOB), carried the Grey Cup on radio across Canada. Those stations were distributed online and to mobile devices via iHeartRadio.

The game was watched by an average of 3.9 million viewers, split between TSN and RDS. Nearly nine million Canadians watched some or all of the game. This represented a 19% increase in viewership over the 106th Grey Cup. Viewership on TSN's streaming platforms also increased 77% over the previous year.

In the United States, the game attracted an audience of 109,000 viewers on ESPN2.

== Entertainment ==
Rock band The Beaches performed during the SiriusXM Kickoff Show while Young Canadians singer Lindsey Kelly, accompanied by the Calgary Stampede Showband sang "O Canada".

On September 26, 2019, it was announced that Keith Urban would be performing during the halftime show. Urban performed a 13-minute medley of songs including "Somebody Like You" and a virtual duet of the song "The Fighter" which featured Carrie Underwood (who is unable to perform due to attending the 2019 American Music Awards) on various screens on the stage.

== Officials ==
The highest rated officials during the 2019 CFL season from their respective positions were selected for the game and announced on November 21, 2019. The CFL kept the standard seven-person crew as opposed to eight-person after that format was used during the 106th Grey Cup game. The numbers below indicate their uniform numbers.

- Referee: #28 André Proulx
- Umpire: #61 Patrick MacArthur
- Head Linesman: #25 Ron Barss
- Line Judge: #19 Chris Shapka
- Side Judge: #47 Jocelyn Paul
- Back Judge: #44 Blair Brown
- Field Judge: #56 Steve Dolyniuk
- Backup Referee: #60 Tom Vallesi
- Backup Umpire: #31 Ben Major
- Backup Official: #27 Andrew Wakefield
- Backup Official: #18 Pierre Laporte
