= Maurice Carnell =

American gridiron football player (born 1994)

Profile
- Position: Defensive back

Personal information
- Born: October 12, 1994 (age 32); San Diego, California, U.S.
- Listed height: 5 ft 10 in (1.78 m)

Career information
- High school: Lincoln High
- College: North Alabama; Grossmont College

Career history
- 2018: Toronto Argonauts*
- 2019–2021: Hamilton Tiger-Cats
- 2022–2023: Toronto Argonauts
- * Offseason or practice squad member only

Awards and highlights
- Grey Cup champion (2022)
- Stats at CFL.ca

Maurice Carnell IV (born October 12, 1994) is an American professional football defensive back. He previously played in the Canadian Football League (CFL) for the Hamilton Tiger-Cats and Toronto Argonauts.

== University career ==
Carnell first played college football for the Grossmont College Griffins from 2014 to 2015. He then transferred to the University of North Alabama to play for the Lions in 2016 and 2017. With the Lions, he played in 23 games where he had 64 tackles, six interceptions, one forced fumble, and one fumble recovery.

== Professional career ==
=== Toronto Argonauts (first stint) ===
Carnell signed with the Toronto Argonauts on June 3, 2018, well after the team had started training camp. He played in one preseason game, but was released shortly after on June 9, 2018.

=== Hamilton Tiger-Cats ===
On May 2, 2019, Carnell signed with the Hamilton Tiger-Cats. Following training camp, he was added to the team's practice roster where he spent most of the 2019 season. He made his professional debut in the last game of the regular season on November 2, 2019. He was re-assigned to the practice roster for the playoffs and did not play in the team's 107th Grey Cup loss to the Winnipeg Blue Bombers. It was announced on December 19, 2019, that Carnell had re-signed with the Tiger-Cats, but did not play in 2020 due to the cancellation of the 2020 CFL season.

Carnell re-signed with the Tiger-Cats on June 29, 2021, but was released in training camp on July 19, 2021.

=== Toronto Argonauts (second stint) ===
On April 5, 2022, Carnell signed with the Argonauts, but was released with the final cuts on June 5, 2022. He re-signed with the team on August 9, 2022. Soon after his signing, Carnell played in his first game as an Argonaut against his former team, the Hamilton Tiger-Cats, on August 12, 2022, as a back up defensive back. In the team's next game, he started at halfback and recorded his first career interception, on August 20, 2022, against the Calgary Stampeders. He continued to start in the secondary and scored his first career touchdown on September 24, 2022, in a game against the Ottawa Redblacks, when he intercepted Caleb Evans and returned the ball 35 yards for the score. In that same game, he also recorded his first multiple interception game since he had picked off Nick Arbuckle earlier in the game.

Carnell sat out the entire 2023 season due to injury. He returned in 2024, but was part of the final training camp cuts on June 1, 2024.

== Personal life ==
Carnell was born to parents Johnisha Carnell and Maurice Carnell III. He has two brothers and one sister.
