= Chris Streveler =

American football player (born 1995)

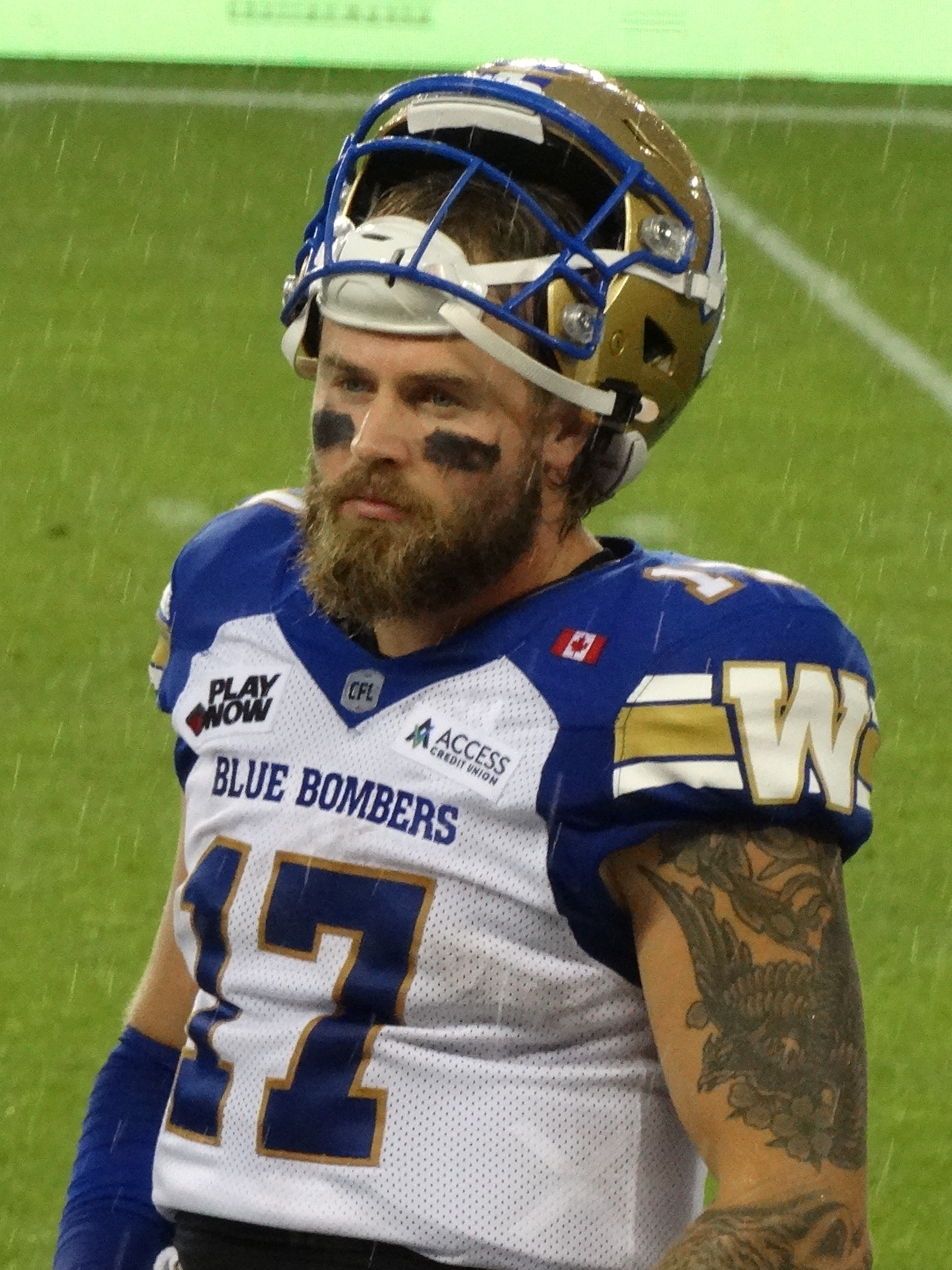
- Streveler with the Winnipeg Blue Bombers in 2025

No. 17, 15
- Position: Quarterback

Personal information
- Born: January 6, 1995 (age 31); Naperville, Illinois, U.S.
- Listed height: 6 ft 2 in (1.88 m)
- Listed weight: 222 lb (101 kg)

Career information
- High school: Marian Central Catholic (Woodstock, Illinois)
- College: Minnesota (2013–2015); South Dakota (2016–2017)
- NFL draft: 2018: undrafted

Career history
- Winnipeg Blue Bombers (2018–2019); Arizona Cardinals (2020–2021); Baltimore Ravens (2021)*; Miami Dolphins (2022)*; New York Jets (2022); Winnipeg Blue Bombers (2024–2025)
- * Offseason or practice squad member only

Awards and highlights
- Grey Cup champion (2019); 2× CFL rushing touchdowns leader (2019, 2024); MVFC Offensive Player of the Year (2017); MVFC Newcomer of the Year (2016); First-team FCS All-America (2017); First-team All-MVFC (2017)

Career NFL statistics
- TD–INT: 1–1
- Passing yards: 231
- Completion percentage: 67.5%
- Passer rating: 80.3
- Rushing yards: 75
- Stats at Pro Football Reference

Career CFL statistics
- Games played: 66
- Completions–Attempts: 366–572
- Passing yards: 4,144
- TD–INT: 26–31
- Passer rating: 78.2
- Rushing yards: 1,740
- Rushing touchdowns: 41
- Stats at CFL.ca

Christopher L. Streveler (born January 6, 1995) is an American former professional football player who was a quarterback in the National Football League (NFL) and Canadian Football League (CFL). He played college football for the Minnesota Golden Gophers and South Dakota Coyotes. After going undrafted in 2018, Streveler played two seasons as a backup quarterback for the Winnipeg Blue Bombers, where they won the 107th Grey Cup championship in 2019. He was also a member of the Arizona Cardinals, Baltimore Ravens, Miami Dolphins, and New York Jets.

== Early life ==
Christopher L. Streveler was born on January 6, 1995, in Naperville, Illinois. He attended Marian Central Catholic High School in Woodstock, Illinois.

== College career ==
Streveler started his college career playing at the University of Minnesota, where he played three years for the Golden Gophers, before transferring to the University of South Dakota. Streveler then played two years with the Coyotes. He threw for 6,081 yards and 54 touchdowns, earning the Missouri Valley Football Conference (MVFC) Offensive Player of the Year award in 2017. He was a runner-up for the Walter Payton Award.

== Professional career ==
Pre-draft measurables
| Height | Weight | Arm length | Hand span | Wingspan | 40-yard dash | 10-yard split | 20-yard split | 20-yard shuttle | Three-cone drill | Vertical jump | Broad jump |
|---|---|---|---|---|---|---|---|---|---|---|---|
| 6 ft 1 5/8 in (1.87 m) | 209 lb (95 kg) | 31 3/8 in (0.80 m) | 8 1/2 in (0.22 m) | 6 ft 2 1/8 in (1.88 m) | 4.51 s | 1.65 s | 2.59 s | 4.73 s | 7.35 s | 38.5 in (0.98 m) | 10 ft 5 in (3.18 m) |
All values from Pro Day

=== Winnipeg Blue Bombers (first stint) ===
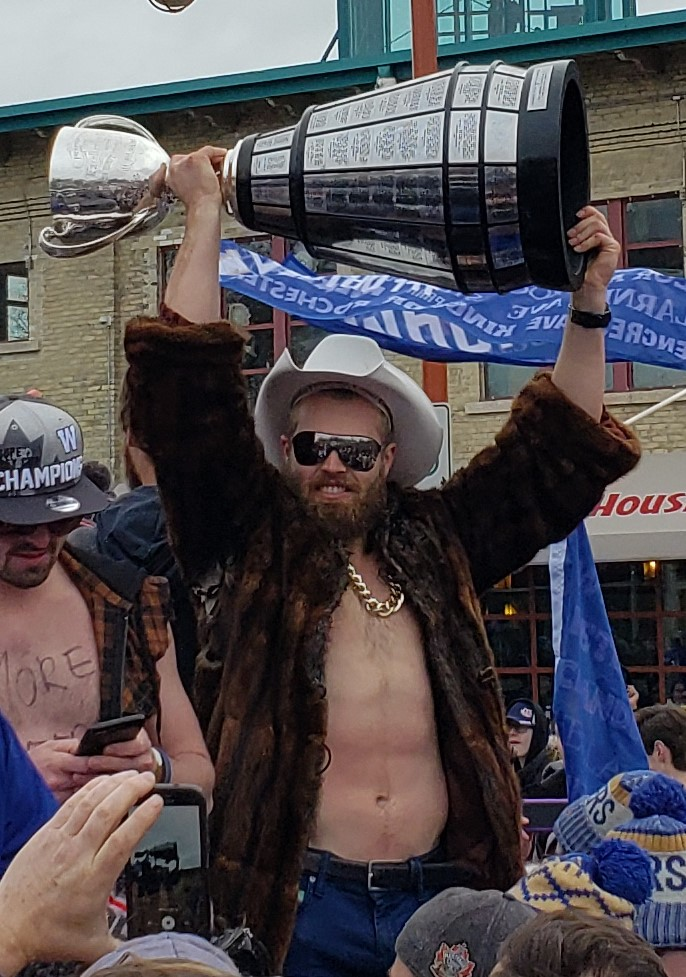
Streveler during the 2019 Grey Cup parade with the Winnipeg Blue Bombers

==== 2018 ====
Streveler signed with the Winnipeg Blue Bombers of the Canadian Football League (CFL) on May 4, 2018, after going undrafted in the 2018 NFL draft. He was expected to compete with Blue Bombers' quarterbacks Matt Nichols, Darian Durant and Alex Ross in training camp. However, the presumptive backup quarterback, Darian Durant, retired before the start of training camp. The Blue Bombers signed quarterback Bryan Bennett to compete with Streveler and Ross for backup behind Nichols. On June 1, 2018, Streveler played in his first preseason game with the Blue Bombers, going 10 for 10 with 140 yards and an 80-yard touchdown pass. On June 6, Nichols suffered an injury in practice that would later sideline him for four to six weeks to open the 2018 season. Instead of signing a veteran quarterback to lead the team, the Blue Bombers elected to start Streveler to open the season. Streveler became the first quarterback to start a CFL game coming out of college since 1994, when future Hall of Famer Anthony Calvillo started for the Las Vegas Posse. Streveler won his first CFL match in Week 2 when the Bombers defeated the Alouettes 56–10. Streveler started the first three games of the season for the Bombers before starting quarterback Nichols returned from injury. Streveler continued to be utilized as a rusher and rotational passer, and finished the season by completing 86 out of 140 passes for 1,134 yards and 11 touchdowns against five interceptions. On the ground, Streveler had 77 carries for 441 yards and 10 more scores.

==== 2019 ====
The 2019 season began with Streveler as the backup quarterback to Nichols. Nichols suffered an injury in Week 10 and was placed on the six-game injured reserve list, which promoted Streveler to the starting role. Despite completing only seven passes for 89 yards Streveler was able to lead the Bombers to a win thanks in part to his rushing performance in which he gained 95 yards and scored a touchdown. Streveler remained the Bombers starting quarterback for eight matches, winning three of those games and losing five. He suffered an injury in Week 19 and was relegated to the injured list for the Bombers final game of the regular season, as the team announced veteran Zach Collaros as the starting quarterback; whom the Bombers had traded for on trade deadline day only a couple weeks prior. Streveler finished 2019 with 1,564 yards passing and eight touchdowns, compared to 14 interceptions in 17 games played. On 127 carries, he put up 726 yards and 12 more majors. Competing as a running option to Collaros, the West Semi-Final victory over the Calgary Stampeders saw Streveler set a CFL playoff record when he took 23 snaps at quarterback without attempting a pass. Streveler played a limited role in the West Final against the Saskatchewan Roughriders, with only one pass attempt and four carries for 10 yards. The Bombers still won and got a chance to compete in the 107th Grey Cup in Calgary. In the championship game, Streveler played a much larger role, throwing a touchdown pass to Andrew Harris, rushing for thirty yards, and catching a pass from Darvin Adams, as the Bombers won their 11th Grey Cup, their first in 29 years.

Following the season, it was reported that Streveler had scheduled workouts with three NFL teams: the Arizona Cardinals, Tampa Bay Buccaneers and Miami Dolphins. He was released on February 3, 2020, in order to pursue NFL opportunities, reportedly with the Cardinals.

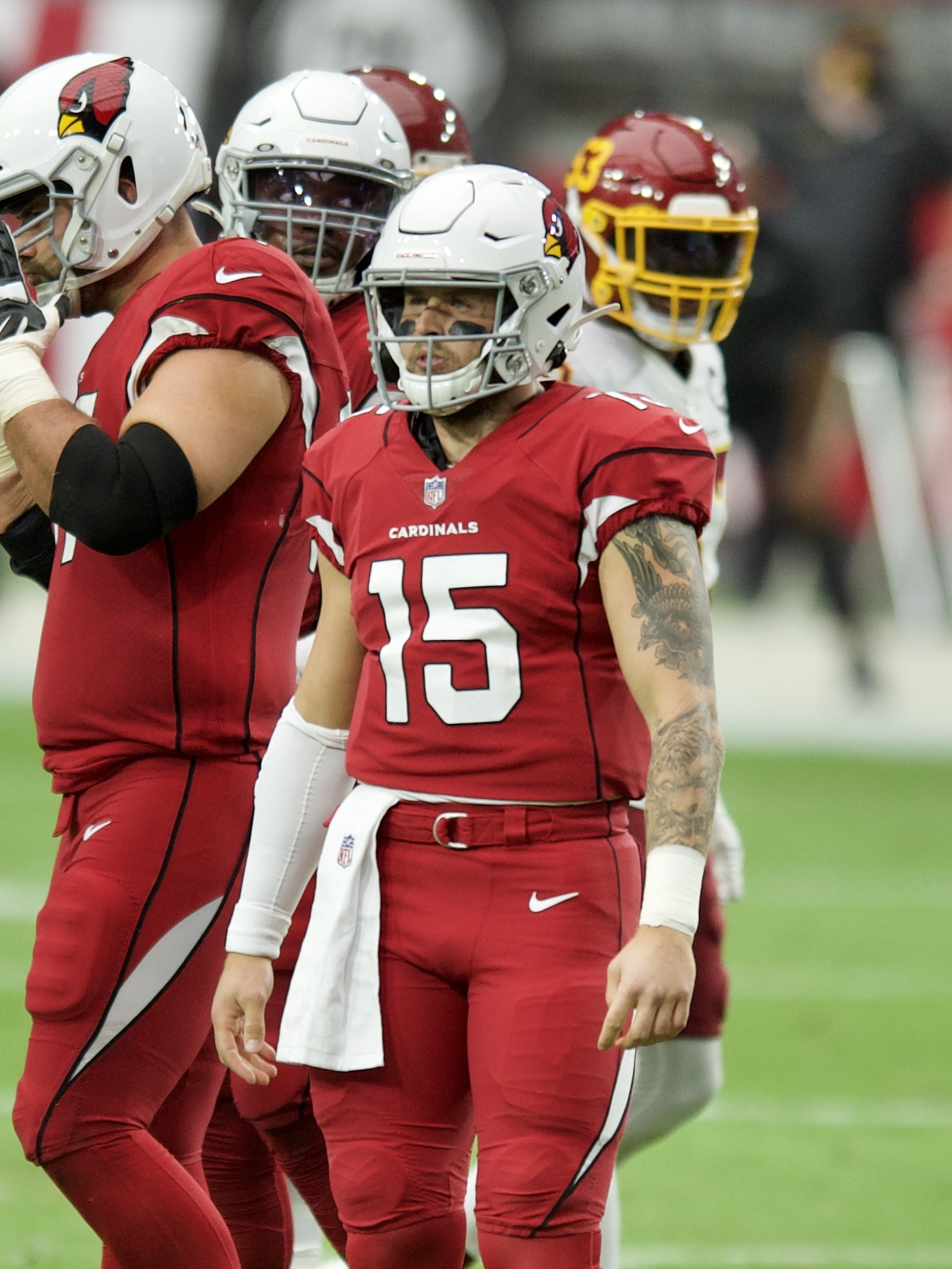
Streveler with the Arizona Cardinals in 2020

=== Arizona Cardinals ===
On February 4, 2020, Streveler signed a reserve/future contract with the Cardinals. Streveler made his NFL debut on September 13, 2020, playing one snap and rushing three yards for a first down as the Cardinals defeated the San Francisco 49ers 24–20. Streveler took over as quarterback in Week 17 (January 3, 2021), replacing the injured Kyler Murray and leading the team to a 18–7 loss against the Los Angeles Rams. During the game, Streveler threw for 105 yards, one touchdown, and one interception.

Streveler entered the 2021 season as the Cardinals third-string quarterback behind Murray and Colt McCoy. On November 22, 2021, Streveler was waived by the Cardinals.

=== Baltimore Ravens ===
On November 29, 2021, Streveler was signed to the practice squad of the Baltimore Ravens.

=== Miami Dolphins ===
On February 22, 2022, Streveler signed with the Dolphins. He was waived on May 18.

=== New York Jets ===
On July 26, 2022, Streveler signed with the New York Jets. Despite a strong preseason performance, he was waived on August 30, and signed to the practice squad the next day.

In Week 16 against the Jacksonville Jaguars, Streveler was credited with a start because he was lined up at wide receiver for the first play of the game. Later in the game, he replaced a struggling Zach Wilson at quarterback. Streveler completed 10-of-15 passes for 90 yards and rushed 9 times for 54 yards as the Jets lost 19–3. He signed a reserve/future contract on January 9, 2023. Streveler was released by the Jets on August 7, after he suffered an injury in the Hall of Fame game versus the Cleveland Browns. Streveler cleared waivers on August 8, and defaulted to the Jets injured reserve. On August 16, Streveler and the Jets reached an injury settlement and he was released from the team's injured reserve.

=== Winnipeg Blue Bombers (second stint) ===
On January 31, 2024, it was announced that Streveler had signed a one-year contract with the Blue Bombers. He began the 2024 season as the primary backup behind Zach Collaros, but started the week 5 matchup against the Ottawa Redblacks while Collaros was injured. He completed 13 of 21 pass attempts for 127 yards and rushed 13 times for 79 yards and one touchdown as he led the Blue Bombers to their first win of the season. Streveler played in 13 regular season games, completing 47 of 74 pass attempts for 558 yards with one touchdown pass and one interception and had 87 carries for 272 yards and ten touchdowns. He suffered a season-ending knee injury in the Banjo Bowl and was on the injured list during the team's loss to the Toronto Argonauts in the 111th Grey Cup.

On February 8, 2025, Streveler agreed to a one-year extension with the Blue Bombers. After Collaros was suspended for one game to start the season, Streveler earned the start and completed 15 of 24 passes for 246 yards, three touchdowns, and an interception in the victory over the BC Lions. He continued to operate the short-yardage team during the 2025 season and started in five total games, posting a 4–1 record as the starter. However, in his last start of the year, in the team's final regular season game, Streveler tore the ACL in his left knee, the same one that ended his season the year prior. He finished the year having dressed in all 18 regular season games where he had 1,103 passing yards with six touchdown passes and 11 interceptions. He also had 68 carries for 301 yards and nine touchdowns on the ground.

Streveler became a free agent upon the expiry of his contract on February 10, 2026. He announced his retirement from professional football on March 29.

== Career statistics ==
Legend
| **Bold** | Career high |

=== CFL ===
| Year | Team | Games | | | Passing | | | | | | | | | Rushing | | | | | Sacked | | Fumbles | |
| Year | Team | GP | GS | Record | Cmp | Att | Pct | Yds | Y/A | Lng | TD | Int | Rtg | Att | Yds | Y/A | Lng | TD | Sck | Yds | Fum | Lost |
|---|---|---|---|---|---|---|---|---|---|---|---|---|---|---|---|---|---|---|---|---|---|---|
| 2018 | WPG | **18** | 4 | 1–3 | 86 | 140 | 61.4 | 1,134 | **8.1** | 80 | **11** | 5 | **98.3** | 77 | 441 | 5.7 | 29 | 10 | 9 | — | 0 | 0 |
| 2019 | WPG | 17 | **8** | 3–5 | **156** | **234** | **66.7** | **1,564** | 6.7 | 58 | 8 | **14** | 72.0 | **127** | **726** | 5.7 | **38** | **12** | 21 | — | **4** | **1** |
| 2024 | WPG | 13 | 1 | 1–0 | 31 | 52 | 59.6 | 343 | 6.6 | 21 | 1 | 1 | 77.6 | 87 | 272 | 3.1 | 27 | 10 | 1 | — | 0 | 0 |
| 2025 | WPG | 18 | 5 | 4–1 | 93 | 146 | 63.7 | 1,103 | 7.6 | 42 | 6 | 11 | 68.9 | 68 | 301 | 4.4 | 36 | 9 | 15 | — | 0 | 0 |
| Career | | 66 | 17 | 9–9 | 366 | 572 | 64.0 | 4,144 | 7.2 | 80 | 26 | 31 | 78.2 | 359 | 1,740 | 4.8 | 38 | 41 | 46 | — | 4 | 1 |

=== NFL ===
| Year | Team | Games | | | Passing | | | | | | | | | Rushing | | | | | Sacked | | Fumbles | |
| Year | Team | GP | GS | Record | Cmp | Att | Pct | Yds | Y/A | Lng | TD | Int | Rtg | Att | Yds | Y/A | Lng | TD | Sck | Yds | Fum | Lost |
|---|---|---|---|---|---|---|---|---|---|---|---|---|---|---|---|---|---|---|---|---|---|---|
| 2020 | ARI | **5** | 0 | — | **11** | **16** | **68.8** | **105** | **6.6** | 19 | **1** | **1** | 81.5 | 4 | 15 | 3.8 | 12 | 0 | **2** | 10 | 1 | 0 |
| 2021 | ARI | 2 | 0 | — | 6 | 9 | 66.7 | 36 | 4.0 | 17 | 0 | 0 | 74.3 | 3 | 6 | 2.0 | 4 | 0 | **2** | **17** | 1 | 0 |
| 2022 | NYJ | 2 | 1 | — | 10 | 15 | 66.7 | 90 | 6.0 | **30** | 0 | 0 | **82.6** | **9** | **54** | **6.0** | **14** | 0 | 0 | 0 | 1 | 0 |
| Career | | 9 | 0 | — | 27 | 40 | 67.5 | 231 | 5.8 | 30 | 1 | 1 | 80.3 | 16 | 75 | 4.7 | 14 | 0 | 4 | 27 | 3 | 0 |

=== College ===
| Year | Team | Games | | Passing | | | | | | | | Rushing | | | |
| Year | Team | GP | Record | Comp | Att | Pct | Yards | Avg | TD | Int | Rate | Att | Yards | Avg | TD |
|---|---|---|---|---|---|---|---|---|---|---|---|---|---|---|---|
| 2013 | Minnesota | Redshirt | | | | | | | | | | | | | |
| 2014 | Minnesota | 5 | 1–0 | 4 | 11 | 36.4 | 37 | 3.4 | 1 | 1 | 76.4 | 36 | 235 | **6.5** | 1 |
| 2015 | Minnesota | 3 | 0–0 | 0 | 0 | 0 | 0 | 0 | 0 | 0 | 0 | 4 | 8 | 2.0 | 0 |
| 2016 | South Dakota | 10 | 4–6 | 164 | 273 | 60.1 | 1,947 | 7.1 | 22 | **9** | 139.9 | 161 | **823** | 5.1 | 9 |
| 2017 | South Dakota | 13 | **8–5** | **316** | **481** | **65.7** | **4,134** | **8.6** | **32** | 8 | **156.5** | **168** | 720 | 4.3 | **11** |
| Minnesota totals | | 8 | 1–0 | 4 | 11 | 36.4 | 37 | 3.4 | 1 | 1 | 76.4 | 40 | 243 | 6.1 | 1 |
| South Dakota totals | | 23 | 12–11 | 480 | 754 | 63.7 | 6,081 | 8.1 | 54 | 17 | 150.5 | 329 | 1,543 | 4.7 | 20 |
| Career | | 31 | 13–11 | 484 | 765 | 63.3 | 6,118 | 7.9 | 55 | 18 | 149.5 | 369 | 1,786 | 4.8 | 21 |
