= Zach Collaros =

American football player (born 1988)

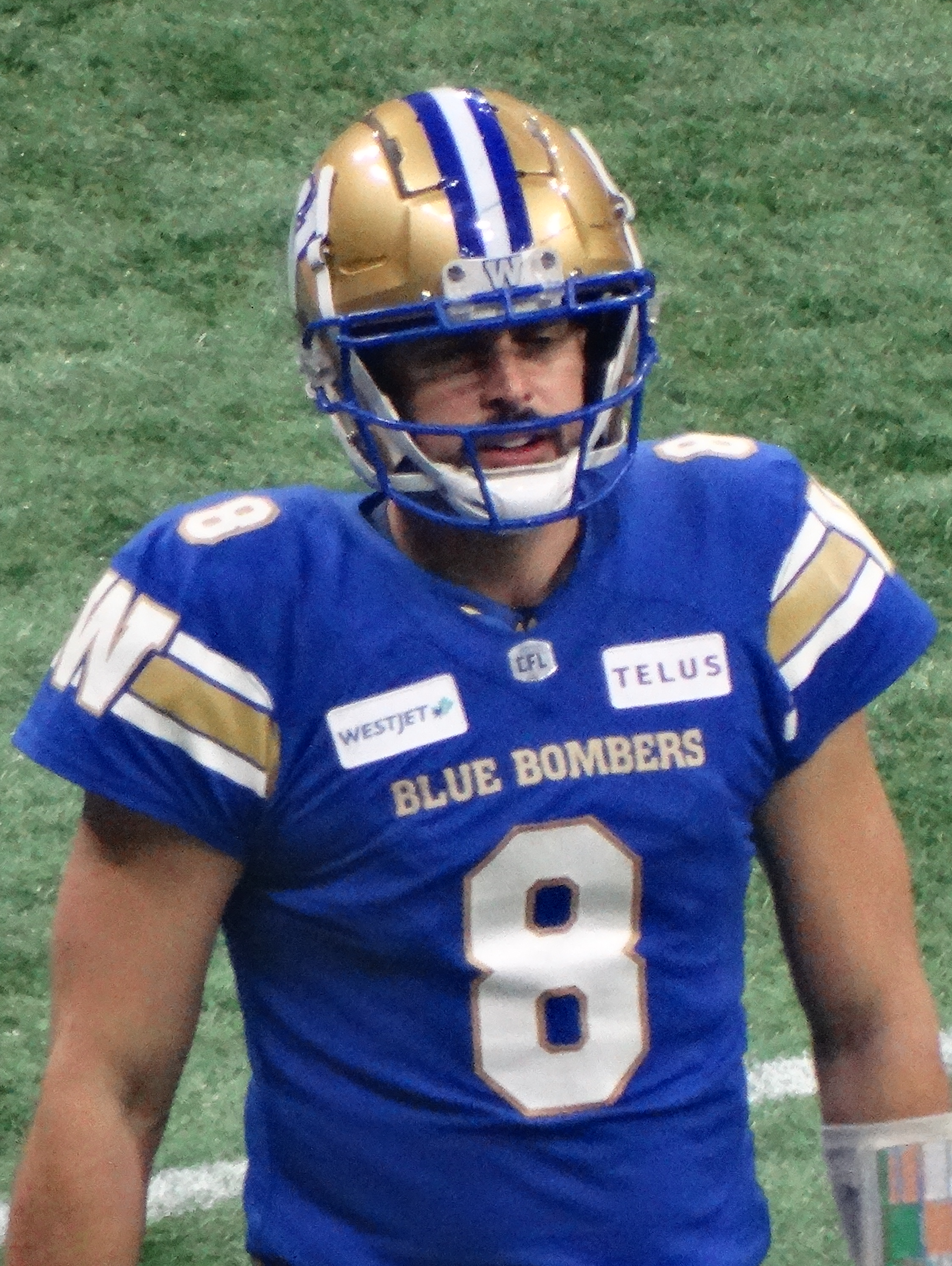
- Collaros with the Winnipeg Blue Bombers in 2024

No. 8 – Winnipeg Blue Bombers
- Position: Quarterback
- Roster status: Active
- CFL status: American

Personal information
- Born: August 27, 1988 (age 38); Steubenville, Ohio, U.S.
- Listed height: 5 ft 11 in (1.80 m)
- Listed weight: 218 lb (99 kg)

Career information
- High school: Steubenville
- College: Cincinnati (2007–2011)
- NFL draft: 2012: undrafted

Career history
- Tampa Bay Buccaneers (2012)*; Toronto Argonauts (2012–2013); Hamilton Tiger-Cats (2014–2017); Saskatchewan Roughriders (2018–2019); Toronto Argonauts (2019); Winnipeg Blue Bombers (2019–present)
- * Offseason or practice squad member only

Awards and highlights
- 3× Grey Cup champion (2012, 2019, 2021); Grey Cup Most Valuable Player (2021); 2× CFL Most Outstanding Player (2021, 2022); 2× Jeff Nicklin Memorial Trophy (2021, 2022); 2× CFL All-Star (2021, 2022); 3× CFL West All-Star (2021, 2022, 2023); 3× CFL passing touchdowns leader (2021, 2022, 2023); First-team All-Big East (2010); Second-team All-Big East (2011)

Career CFL statistics as of 2026
- Passing completions: 3,054
- Passing attempts: 4,481
- Percentage: 68.2%
- TD–INT: 231–127
- Passing yards: 38,972
- Rushing yards: 1,527
- Rushing touchdowns: 11
- Stats at CFL.ca

Zachary J. Collaros (born August 27, 1988) is an American professional football quarterback for the Winnipeg Blue Bombers of the Canadian Football League (CFL). He is a three-time Grey Cup champion after winning as a backup with the Toronto Argonauts in 2012, and twice as a starter with the Blue Bombers in 2019 and 2021. He was the Grey Cup Most Valuable Player in the 2021 game and was the CFL's Most Outstanding Player in 2021 and 2022. He is also a three-time Divisional All-Star and two-time CFL All-Star. Collaros played college football for the Cincinnati Bearcats, and has also been a member of the Tampa Bay Buccaneers, Hamilton Tiger-Cats, and Saskatchewan Roughriders.

== Early life ==
Collaros graduated from Steubenville (Ohio) High School in 2007, after leading the Big Red to Division III state titles in the 2005 and 2006 seasons, ending with an undefeated 30–0 record as a starter.

== College career ==
Collaros was one of five quarterbacks to play for the Cincinnati Bearcats during the 2008 season. After Tony Pike was injured in the Akron game, Collaros took his first snap as college quarterback halfway through the fourth quarter. On the season, he had one completion on four attempts for a total of two yards. He also rushed six times for a total of 29 yards.

When Pike was injured midway through the 2009 season, during a game against South Florida, Collaros again took over; on his third snap, he ran for a key 75-yard touchdown. He went on to start the next four games while Pike recovered from a broken arm. During week 10, Collaros won Big East Offensive Player of the Week, after racking up a Big East record 555 yards of total offense (480 passing, 75 rushing) and accounting for three touchdowns (one passing, two rushing) in a 48–45 win over Connecticut. In four starts, the second half of the USF game, and several "cameo appearances," Collaros racked up relatively big numbers (1,434 yards and 10 touchdowns passing, 344 yards and 4 touchdowns rushing).

Collaros was Cincinnati's starting quarterback for the 2010 season. He led the Big East in passing yards with 2,902 and touchdowns with 26. He was selected as the 2010 first-team All-Big East quarterback.

Collaros was again named the starting quarterback for the 2011 season, his second full year as the starter.

== Professional career ==
Pre-draft measurables
Height	Weight	40-yard dash	10-yard split	20-yard split	20-yard shuttle	Three-cone drill	Vertical jump	Broad jump	Bench press
5 ft 11 1/4 in (1.81 m)	217 lb (98 kg)	4.65 s	1.56 s	2.69 s	4.38 s	7.06 s	34.0 in (0.86 m)	9 ft 5 in (2.87 m)	22 reps
All values from Pro Day

=== Tampa Bay Buccaneers ===
Collaros signed with the Tampa Bay Buccaneers after going undrafted in the 2012 NFL draft but did not make the team.

=== Toronto Argonauts (first stint) ===
Collaros signed a contract to play for the Toronto Argonauts of the Canadian Football League in June 2012. He played in one game during the 2012 CFL season, completing seven of 11 passes for 101 yards and one touchdown. In the first preseason game of the 2013 CFL season he completed nine of 12 passes for 95 yards and one touchdown. On July 30, he had his first CFL start in place of the injured Ricky Ray, as the Argonauts defeated the B.C. Lions at the Rogers Centre. He threw for three touchdowns and completed 21 of 25 passes for 253 yards. Collaros had an outstanding 2013 season. He played in 14 games that season and was the starting quarterback for eight games, due to an injury to Ricky Ray. He completed 190 of 287 pass attempts at a strong completion percentage of 66.2%. He threw for 2,316 yards, 14 touchdowns and only six interceptions, for a quarterback rating of 98.4. He was not selected by the Ottawa Redblacks in the 2013 CFL Expansion Draft because he was set to become a free agent in February 2014. The Redblacks did not want to risk their selections on players who may not re-sign with their new team. Collaros was set to become a free-agent in February 2014 if a contract extension could not be agreed upon by the Argos. Upon understanding that Collaros would not re-sign with the Argos and would instead test the free-agent market, Argos general manager Jim Barker decided to release Collaros prior to the start of free agency. After failing to come to terms on a new contract, the Argonauts released Collaros on January 29, 2014.

=== Hamilton Tiger-Cats ===
On January 30, 2014, Collaros announced his intention to sign with the Hamilton Tiger-Cats. He signed a contract later that day to keep him in Hamilton through the 2016 season. In his first season with the Tiger-Cats Collaros started in 13 of the 18 regular season games and helped lead the Tiger-Cats to a 9–9 record (first-place in the East division) and took them all the way to the 102nd Grey Cup game; in which they were defeated by the Calgary Stampeders. Collaros came into form in the 2015 CFL season leading the Tiger-Cats to a record of 8–3 to start the season. In a game against the Eskimos on September 19, 2015, Collaros left the game with a leg injury and did not return to the field. It was announced two days later that he had suffered a torn ACL and would miss the remainder of the 2015 season. At the time of the injury Collaros was leading the league in passing yards (3,376), touchdown passes (25) and passer rating (113.7).

On May 4, 2016, Tiger-Cats head coach Kent Austin announced that Collaros would be limited in training camp, and likely miss the start of the 2016 regular season as he recovers from his torn ACL injury. On June 19, three days before the season commenced, Austin confirmed that Collaros would not be starting the season as he continued to rehab his knee. Prior to Week 8, and almost 11 months since sustaining his knee injury, Collaros returned to practising with the first team offense. Collaros made his season debut in time for the team's Week 8 match against the BC Lions. The following season, on August 29, 2017, after an 0–8 start to the 2017 season, Tiger-Cats head coach June Jones announced that Jeremiah Masoli would get the start at quarterback in Week 11 over Collaros. Collaros did not start another game for the Tiger-Cats in the 2017 season. By all accounts, 2017 was the worst season of Collaros' career. Not only did he not win a game, he also posted a career low quarterback efficiency rating of 88.1 and career low completion percentage (62.8%). His touchdown-to-interception ratio (8:7) was also the lowest of his career.

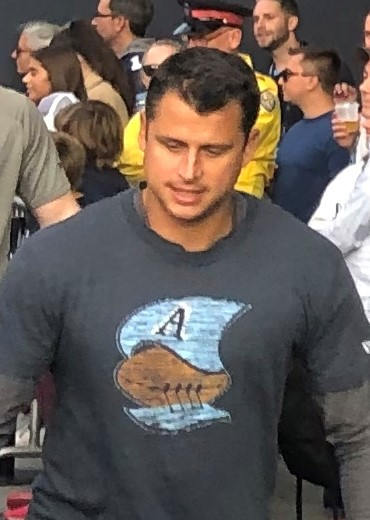
Collaros with the Toronto Argonauts in 2019

=== Saskatchewan Roughriders ===
On January 3, 2018, Collaros was traded to the Saskatchewan Roughriders for a 2nd round pick in the 2018 CFL draft. On January 19, 2018, Collaros agreed to a restructured contract with the Riders. Prior to the restructured deal Collaros was set to make $500,000 in 2018, plus a $200,000 roster bonus due February 1, 2018. Collaros suffered a concussion in the team's Week 2 loss to the Ottawa Redblacks. In the following week Collaros was placed on the six-game injured reserve. Collaros played in 14 regular season games during the 2018 regular season, leading the Riders to a 12–6 record and a home playoff game. Collaros was unable to play in the Western Semi-Final playoff game because of a concussion, and the Riders were defeated by the Blue Bombers 23–18, ending their season. Collaros re-signed with the Riders on the opening day of free agency, February 12, 2019, for a one-year contract. Collaros was knocked out of the first game of the season when he was hit in the head by Ti-Cats linebacker Simoni Lawrence while attempting to slide. Collaros was subsequently placed on the 6-game injured list.

=== Toronto Argonauts (second stint) ===
On July 31, 2019, Collaros was traded to the Argonauts in exchange for a conditional fourth round pick in the 2020 CFL draft. The pick could have been upgraded to as high as a second-round pick in that draft if Collaros had met playing time targets and extension clauses. In early September 2019, Collaros was still unable to participate in practice because of the concussion he suffered in Week 1. However, by the end of the month he was throwing the ball in practice.

=== Winnipeg Blue Bombers ===
Collaros was traded to the Winnipeg Blue Bombers, on the CFL's 2019 trade deadline day, October 9, 2019, along with an exchange of draft picks in the 2020 CFL draft. The Bombers had lost starting quarterback Matt Nichols to a season ending injury earlier in the season and the Bombers had lost four of their last five games with Chris Streveler under centre. Prior to the last game of the regular season, Collaros started taking first-team reps in practice for the Bombers, and was announced as the starting quarterback on October 24, 2019, taking over for an injured Streveler. Collaros threw his first passes of the year to count (his lone attempt for the Roughriders was wiped out due to a defensive penalty) and lead the Blue Bombers to a victory in their season finale. Collaros formed a QB tandem with Streveler, where Streveler served primarily as a gritty run option. The two turned what had been a late season slump for the Bombers, into a post-season winning streak that saw Winnipeg defeat the Hamilton Tiger-Cats 33–12 to win the 107th Grey Cup. Collaros' Grey Cup victory was unique in that he beat Saskatchewan, the team he started the season with in the division finals and then beat Hamilton, whose linebacker Simoni Lawrence had hit him in the head in Week 1 and knocking him out for a significant portion of the season, on his way to the championship. The media had frequently brought these circumstances up and Collaros did not answer them until the final media session after the Grey Cup saying "What are they calling it? The revenge tour? We finished it. It’s over. Last show tonight." On January 27, 2020, Collaros and the Bombers agreed to a two-year contract extension, preventing him from becoming a free agent on February 11.

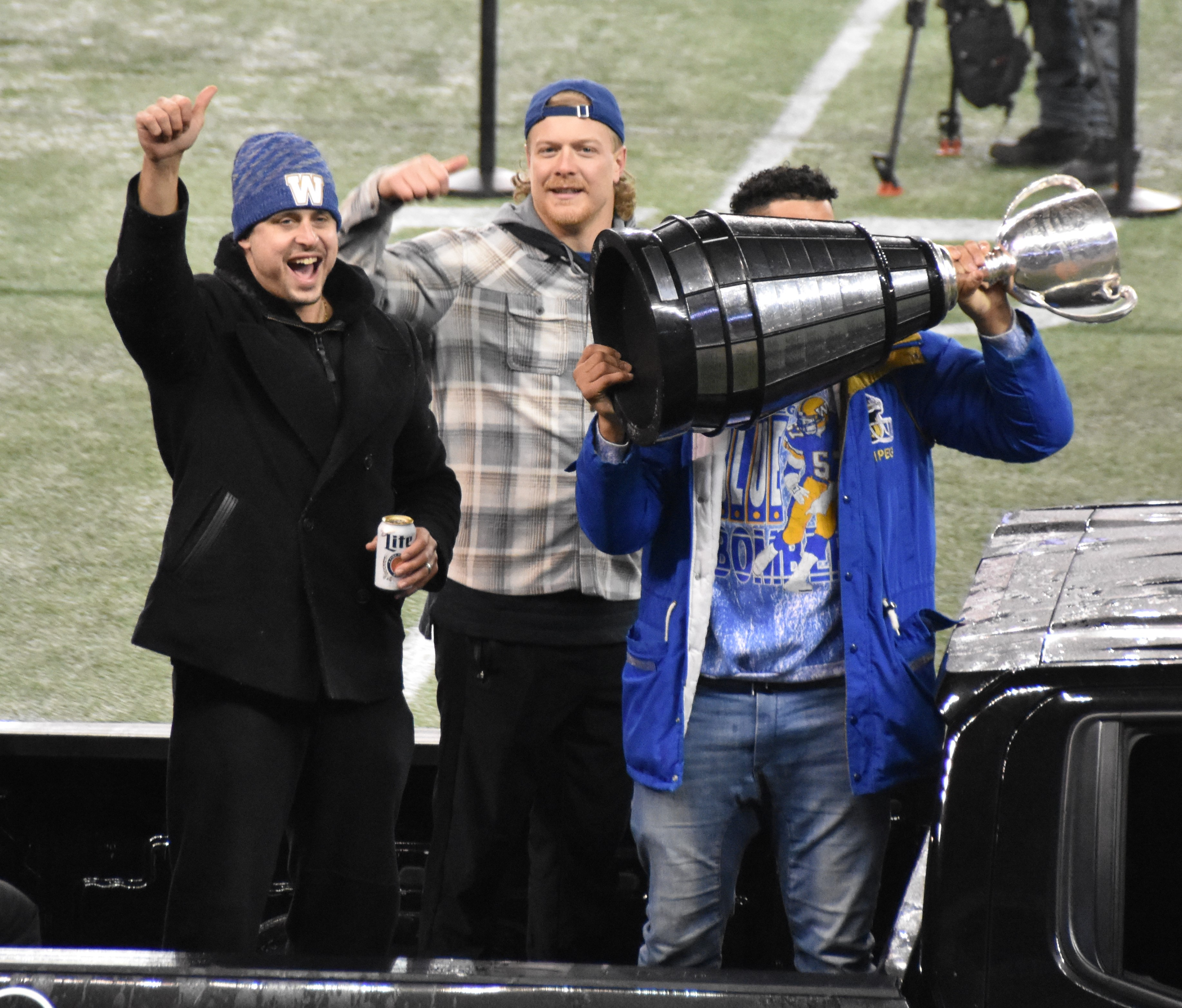
Collaros (left) as Andrew Harris raises the Grey Cup at Winnipeg's 2021 Grey Cup celebration.

Due to the cancellation of the 2020 CFL season, Collaros did not play in 2020. He entered the 2021 Winnipeg Blue Bombers season as the undisputed starter and completed 18 of 28 pass attempts for 217 yards and two touchdowns in the season-opening Grey Cup rematch against the Hamilton Tiger-Cats. He threw for a season-high 417 yards, the second highest of his career, and two touchdowns in a week 9 win over the BC Lions on October 1, 2021. The Blue Bombers clinched first place in the league in week 12 with three games remaining as Collaros had a 10–1 record as the team's starting quarterback. He finished the season having played and started in 13 regular season games, completing 243 passes out of 346 attempts for 3,185 yards, 20 touchdowns, and six interceptions. He had a 111.01 quarterback passer rating, which at the time was the 10th-best single season rating in CFL history. For his dominant year, he was named a CFL All-Star and the CFL's Most Outstanding Player. In Winnipeg's first West Final playoff game since 1972, Collaros completed 17 out of 21 pass attempts for 229 yards, one touchdown, and three interceptions in the victory over the Saskatchewan Roughriders. He then started in his third career Grey Cup game in the 108th Grey Cup championship, which was once again against the Hamilton Tiger-Cats. Collaros completed 21 of 32 pass attempts for 240 yards, two touchdowns, and two interceptions in the 33–25 overtime victory over the Tiger-Cats and he was named the Grey Cup Most Valuable Player.

Collaros and the Blue Bombers agreed to a one-year contract extension on January 20, 2022. Collaros continued his impressive play into the 2022 season leading the Bombers to a second consecutive first-place finish in the Western Division. With three weeks remaining in the season, and a first-round bye already secured, the Bombers began resting Collaros for the playoffs. On October 18, 2022, the Bombers announced they had signed Collaros to a three-year contract extension, keeping him with the club through 2025. He ended the season leading the league in touchdown passes with 37 and highest touchdown rate (8.49%). His 116.20 quarterback passer rating, was the 4th-best single season rating in CFL history and he won his second consecutive CFL's Most Outstanding Player award. In the playoffs, Collaros helped lead the Bombers to their third consecutive Grey Cup appearance where they were favored against the underdog Toronto Argonauts. Hoping to become the first team in 40 years to win three consecutive Grey Cups, the Bombers led 23–14 at the start of the 4th quarter. Unfortunately for Collaros, they were ultimately upset by the Argos who prevailed with a score of 24–23. Collaros played poorly in the game completing only 14 out of 23 pass attempts for 183 yards, one interception and no touchdowns, his worst performance of the season.

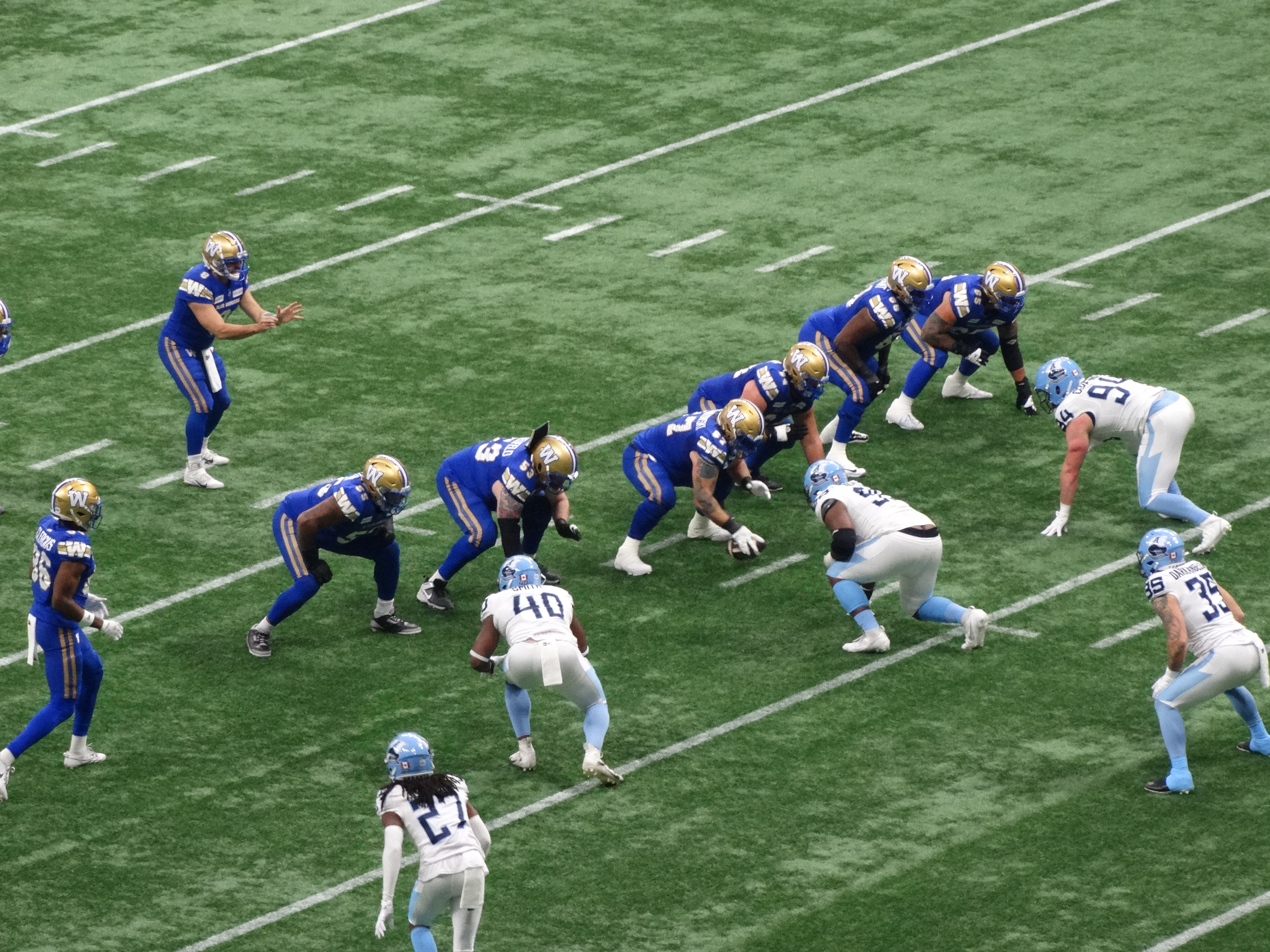
Collaros (8) calls for the snap in the 111th Grey Cup game.

In 2023, Collaros and the Blue Bombers continued to dominate the regular season as the team started with a 6–2 record. In the ninth game of the season, against the Edmonton Elks, Collaros completed just two of five passes for six yards before exiting the game with a head injury. He missed one game and returned to play in the team's 47–17 victory over the Montreal Alouettes in week 12. After the Blue Bombers clinched first place in the West Division for the third straight season following their week 20 victory over the Elks, Collaros rest for the final game of the regular season. He started in 16 regular season games, completing 69.0% of his passes for 4,252 yards, 33 touchdowns and 15 interceptions. He also had two rushing touchdowns, his first since 2015. Despite leading the league in passing touchdowns and passer rating, he was not nominated for the CFL's Most Outstanding Player Award as his team's nomination went to Brady Oliveira. In the West Final, Collaros completed 14 of 21 pass attempts for 158 yards in the Blue Bombers' 24–13 victory over the BC Lions. He then started in his fourth consecutive Grey Cup game, as he completed 19 of 23 passes for 236 yards and one interception in the team's last minute 24–28 loss to the Alouettes in the 110th Grey Cup game.

In the 2024 season, the Blue Bombers had an uncharacteristically slow start to the season as the team started with four straight losses and Collaros had no passing touchdowns with four interceptions. He also suffered a thorax injury in the team's fourth game and sat out the second half and overtime in the 22–19 loss to the Calgary Stampeders. He missed one game due to the injury, and returned in week 6, also against the Stampeders, where he completed 27 of 36 passes for 344 yards, two touchdowns, and two interceptions, in the Blue Bombers' victory. While Collaros was strong statistically, the Blue Bombers also lost their next two games to drop their record to 2–6. Thereafter, the team won eight straight games and nine of ten as the Blue Bombers finished in first place for the fourth consecutive season. During the streak, Collaros had one of the best games of his career against the Elks as he completed 21 of 26 pass attempts for 432 yards and six touchdowns. He finished the season with career highs in completions (342), attempts (488), and passing yards (4,336) although he had just 17 passing touchdowns along with a career-high 15 interceptions. Collaros had an outstanding game in the West Final as he completed 19 of 26 pass attempts for 301 yards and four touchdowns in the victory over the Saskatchewan Roughriders. He started in his fifth straight Grey Cup game, in the 111th Grey Cup, but suffered an injury to his finger, which contributed to his four interceptions thrown as Collaros completed 15 of 30 passes for 202 yards in the team's third straight championship loss.

On May 7, 2025, it was announced the Collaros had been suspended for one game after failing to respond to Canadian Centre for Ethics in Sport (CCES) officials for an off-season drug test. The CCES attempted to contact Collaros twice by phone, once by text, and once by email over a two-hour period and he did not respond within 24 hours.

== Career statistics ==
Legend
	CFL's Most Outstanding Player
	Won the Grey Cup
	Led the league
**Bold**	Career high

=== Regular season ===
		Games			Passing							Rushing
Year	Team	GP	GS	Rec	Comp	Att	Pct	Yards	TD	Int	Rating	Att	Yards	Avg	Long	TD
2012	TOR	4	0	—	7	11	63.6	101	1	0	**123.7**	3	17	5.7	8	0
2013	TOR	**18**	8	5–3	190	287	66.2	2,316	14	6	98.4	**59**	246	4.2	21	**5**
2014	HAM	13	13	8–5	279	424	65.8	3,261	15	9	91.9	57	**328**	5.8	**28**	2
2015	HAM	12	12	8–4	252	359	70.2	3,376	25	8	113.7	28	164	5.9	18	1
2016	HAM	10	10	3–7	232	347	66.9	2,938	18	8	100.8	7	39	5.6	10	0
2017	HAM	**18**	8	0–8	167	266	62.8	1,767	8	7	81.1	8	52	6.5	18	0
2018	SSK	14	14	10–4	234	382	61.3	2,999	9	13	79.5	24	103	4.3	15	0
2019	SSK	1	1	0–1	0	0	0.0	0	0	0	0.0	1	7	7.0	7	0
2019	TOR	0	0	—	0	0	0.0	0	0	0	0.0	0	0	0.0	0	0
2019	WPG	2	1	1–0	22	28	**78.6**	221	2	1	108.5	3	10	3.3	5	0
2020	WPG	Season cancelled
2021	WPG	13	13	11–2	243	346	70.2	3,185	20	6	111.0	10	63	6.3	18	0
2022	WPG	**18**	**17**	15–2	305	436	70.0	4,183	**37**	13	116.2	6	49	**8.2**	11	0
2023	WPG	**18**	16	12–4	291	422	69.0	4,252	33	**15**	112.8	14	77	5.5	13	2
2024	WPG	**18**	**17**	10–7	**342**	**488**	70.1	**4,336**	17	15	96.3	23	168	7.3	21	0
2025	WPG	13	13	6–7	254	350	72.6	3,048	17	**16**	96.0	18	130	7.2	18	1
2026	WPG	12	12	7–5	236	335	70.4	2,989	15	10	100.5	16	76	4.8	14	0
CFL totals		184	155	96–59	3,054	4,481	68.2	38,972	231	127	100.5	277	1,529	5.5	28	11

=== Playoffs ===
Year & game	Team	GP	GS	ATT	COMP	YD	TD	INT	RUSH	YD	TD
2012 East Semi-Final	TOR	0	-	-	-	-	-	-	-	-	-
2012 East Final	TOR	0	-	-	-	-	-	-	-	-	-
2013 East Final	TOR	1	0	0	-	-	-	-	2	3	1
2014 East Final	HAM	1	1	27	18	199	0	0	3	19	0
2015 East Semi-Final	HAM	0	-	-	-	-	-	-	-	-	-
2015 East Final	HAM	0	-	-	-	-	-	-	-	-	-
2016 East Semi-Final	HAM	1	1	31	20	236	0	1	1	1	0
2018 West Semi-Final	SSK	0	-	-	-	-	-	-	-	-	-
2019 West Semi-Final	WPG	1	1	21	11	193	1	0	0	-	-
2019 West Final	WPG	1	1	25	17	267	1	0	1	8	0
2021 West Final	WPG	1	1	21	17	229	1	3	1	0	0
2022 West Final	WPG	1	1	20	14	178	1	1	2	2	0
2023 West Final	WPG	1	1	21	14	158	0	0	0	-	-
2024 West Final	WPG	1	1	26	19	301	4	0	1	10	0
Totals		9	8	192	130	1,761	8	5	11	43	1

=== Grey Cup ===
Year	Team	GP	GS	ATT	COMP	YD	TD	INT	RUSH	YD	TD
2012	TOR	0	-	-	-	-	-	-	-	-	-
2014	HAM	1	1	33	25	342	1	0	3	11	0
2019	WPG	1	1	23	17	170	0	0	0	-	-
2021	WPG	1	1	32	21	240	2	2	0	-	-
2022	WPG	1	1	23	14	183	0	1	1	7	0
2023	WPG	1	1	23	19	236	0	1	1	4	0
2024	WPG	1	1	30	15	202	0	4	0	-	-
Totals		6	6	164	111	1,373	3	8	5	22	0

=== College ===
Year	Team	Games			Passing								Rushing			
Year	Team	GP	GS	Record	Cmp	Att	Pct	Yds	Y/A	TD	Int	Rtg	Att	Yds	Avg	TD
2007	Cincinnati	0	0	—	Redshirted (redshirt)											
2008	Cincinnati	8	0	—	1	4	25.0	2	0.5	0	0	29.2	6	29	4.8	0
2009	Cincinnati	**12**	4	**4−0**	93	124	**75.0**	1,434	**11.6**	10	2	**195.5**	57	**344**	**6.0**	4
2010	Cincinnati	11	**11**	4−7	**225**	**383**	58.7	**2,902**	7.6	**26**	**14**	137.5	**121**	202	1.7	4
2011	Cincinnati	10	10	8−2	166	272	61.0	1,940	7.1	15	10	131.8	84	234	2.8	**8**
Career		41	25	16−9	485	783	61.9	6,278	8.0	51	26	144.1	268	809	3.0	16

== Personal life ==
Collaros and his wife, Nicole, own a home in Aurora, Ontario. The couple were acquainted through former Hamilton Tiger-Cats player Andy Fantuz and his wife Amanda, and they were married in February 2019.

He is of Greek heritage and is an enthusiastic practitioner of Greek dance. Collaros was a roommate of future NFL players Travis Kelce and Jason Kelce in college, and remains good friends with both brothers.
