= David Watford =

American football player (born 1993)

No. 6, 9, 14
- Position: Quarterback

Personal information
- Born: June 16, 1993 (age 33); Hampton, Virginia, U.S.
- Listed height: 6 ft 2 in (1.88 m)
- Listed weight: 212 lb (96 kg)

Career information
- High school: Hampton
- College: Virginia (2011–2014); Hampton (2015)
- NFL draft: 2016: undrafted

Career history
- Philadelphia Eagles (2016–2017)*; Saskatchewan Roughriders (2017–2018); Hamilton Tiger-Cats (2019–2021)
- * Offseason or practice squad member only

Career CFL statistics
- Passing completions: 60
- Passing attempts: 97
- Passing yards: 584
- TD–INT: 2–2
- Rushing touchdowns: 6
- Stats at CFL.ca
- Stats at Pro Football Reference

David Watford (born June 16, 1993) is an American former professional football player who was a quarterback in the Canadian Football League (CFL). He played college football for the Virginia Cavaliers for three seasons before transferring to Hampton Pirates.

== Early life ==
Watford attended Hampton High School in Hampton, Virginia.

== Professional career ==
=== Philadelphia Eagles ===
Watford went undrafted in the 2016 NFL draft. He signed with the Philadelphia Eagles as a wide receiver on July 27, 2016. He was waived on September 3, 2016, and was signed to the practice squad the next day. He signed a reserve/future contract with the Eagles on January 2, 2017. He was waived on August 26, 2017.

=== Saskatchewan Roughriders ===
On October 9, 2017, Watford was signed to the Saskatchewan Roughriders' practice squad as a quarterback. Watford made his professional debut for the Roughriders the following season in the second half of the Riders Week 3 loss to the Montreal Alouettes. Watord, who came on to replace an ineffective Brandon Bridge, completed 10 of 22 pass attempts for 108 yards, throwing one touchdown and two interceptions in the game. Watford struggled in limited playing time in 2018, completing 15 of 32 pass attempts for 168 yards with one touchdown and two interceptions. In the playoffs where the Roughriders were eliminated in their lone game against Winnipeg in the West Division semi-final, Watford recorded one rush for 6 yards. Additionally he was brought in for the final play where he threw a desperation deep pass which was intercepted. Watford was unable to beat out free agent addition Cody Fajardo during the 2019 preseason, and was cut on June 8.

=== Hamilton Tiger-Cats ===
On July 29, 2019, after a season-ending injury to starting QB Jeremiah Masoli, the Tiger-Cats announced that they had signed Watford. Watford provided depth to Hamilton, served as a short yardage rusher who scored 6 touchdowns during 12 games played, and in garbage time in Hamilton's season finale, brought the team in range for a game winning field goal; Hamilton's win was meaningless for playoff seeding purposes which had been settled weeks prior, but it did further establish a franchise best record of 15–3. Watford had two more rushing touchdowns in the Eastern final, a victory which advanced Hamilton to the CFL championship game. During the 107th Grey Cup, Watford was stopped short on a third and short rush, one of many stops made by Winnipeg's defensive line for a Blue Bomber victory.

Watford was released by the Ti-Cats in June 2021, but rejoined the team during the regular season. Following a series of injuries to quarterbacks Masoli and Evans, on September 16, 2021, Watford was named the starter for Hamilton's week 7 game against the Calgary Stampeders. Watford led Hamilton to a win in his first career start thanks to a simplified game-plan. Watford failed to lead a touchdown drive, but only threw 3 incompletions on 22 attempts, and was also Hamilton's leading rusher for the game. Watford started the next game as well, a victory over the Ottawa Redblacks, before returning to a backup and situational rushing role. Watford played 6 games overall in 2021 until Masoli and Evans both returned from injury. Watford completed 40 passed out of 57 attempts with one touchdown and no turnovers, plus 24 rushes for 96 yards.
