= Derek Jones (Canadian football) =

Canadian football player (born 1992)

Profile
- Position: Defensive back

Personal information
- Born: May 22, 1992 (age 34); Edmonton, Alberta, Canada
- Listed height: 6 ft 1 in (1.85 m)
- Listed weight: 192 lb (87 kg)

Career information
- College: Simon Fraser
- CFL draft: 2014: 4th round, 29th overall pick

Career history
- 2014–2019: Winnipeg Blue Bombers
- 2020–2021: BC Lions*
- * Offseason or practice squad member only

Awards and highlights
- Grey Cup champion (2019)
- Stats at CFL.ca

Derek Jones (born May 22, 1992) is a Canadian former professional football who was a defensive back in the Canadian Football League (CFL). He was drafted 29th overall in the fourth round of the 2014 CFL draft by the Winnipeg Blue Bombers. On February 11, 2020, he signed a two-year contract with the BC Lions. He played college football for the Simon Fraser Clan, and retired from football on June 23, 2021.

His father, Ed Jones, played in the CFL for nine years and won five Grey Cup championships with the Edmonton Eskimos.
