= Jaelon Acklin =

American gridiron football player (born 1995)

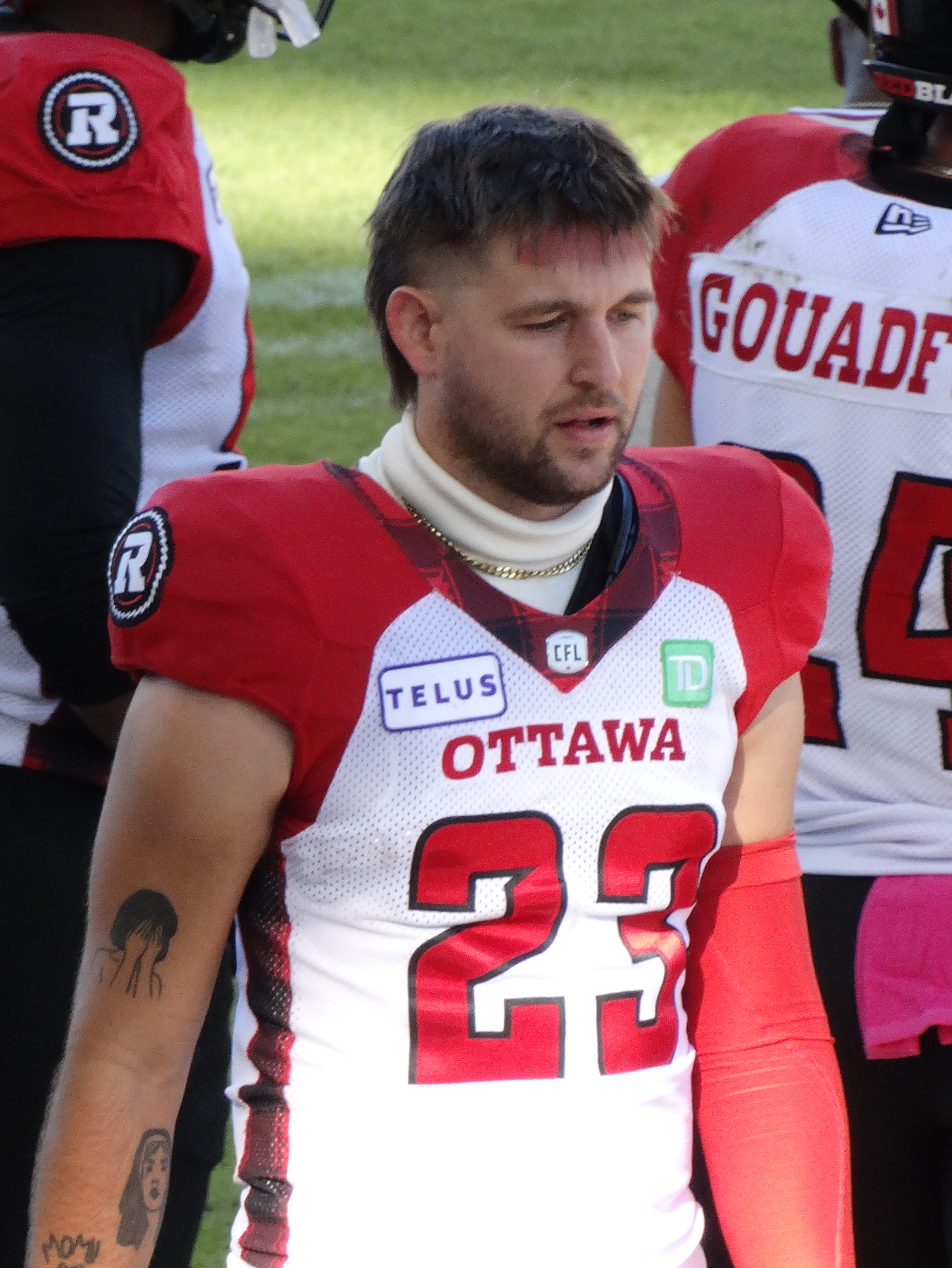
- Acklin with the Ottawa Redblacks in 2024

No. 80, 23
- Position: Wide receiver

Personal information
- Born: August 10, 1995 (age 31); Springfield, Missouri, U.S.
- Listed height: 6 ft 2 in (1.88 m)
- Listed weight: 190 lb (86 kg)

Career information
- High school: Liberty (Mountain View, Missouri)
- College: Western Illinois (2014–2017)
- NFL draft: 2018: undrafted

Career history
- Baltimore Ravens (2018)*; Hamilton Tiger-Cats (2019–2021); Ottawa Redblacks (2022–2024)
- * Offseason or practice squad member only

Awards and highlights
- 2× CFL East All-Star (2021–2022)

Career CFL statistics
- Games played: 80
- Targets: 474
- Receptions: 319
- Receiving yards: 4,186
- Touchdowns: 14
- Stats at CFL.ca

Jaelon D. Acklin (born August 10, 1995) is an American former professional football wide receiver who played for five seasons in the Canadian Football League (CFL). He played college football at Western Illinois. Acklin was a member of the Baltimore Ravens, Hamilton Tiger-Cats, and Ottawa Redblacks.

== Early life ==
Jaelon D. Acklin was born on August 10, 1995, in Springfield, Missouri. He attended Liberty High School in Mountain View, Missouri.

== College career ==
Acklin played college football for the Western Illinois Leathernecks from 2014 to 2017. He caught 84 passes for 1,369 yards and 10 touchdowns his senior year, finishing with career totals of 105 receptions for 1,733 yards and 12 touchdowns.

== Professional career ==
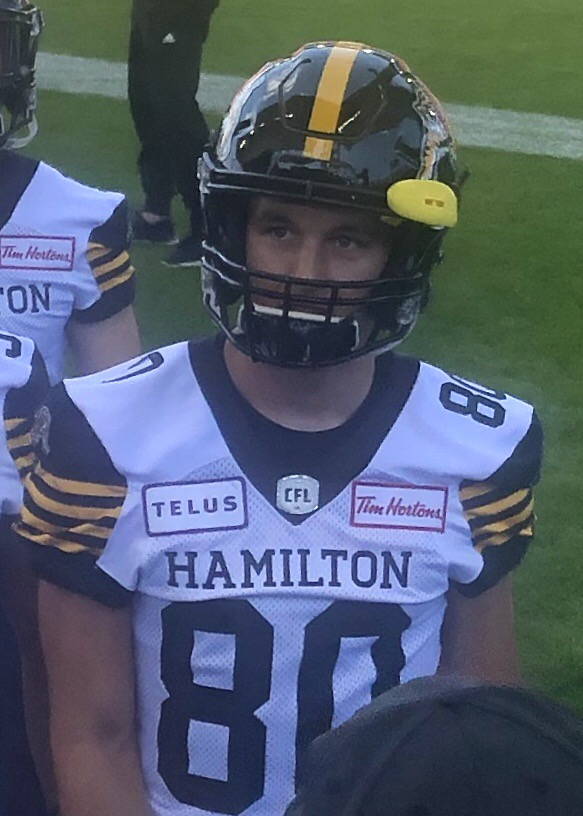
Acklin with the Hamilton Tiger-Cats in 2019

=== Baltimore Ravens ===
Acklin was signed by the Baltimore Ravens as an undrafted free agent and participated in their 2018 training camp; however, after a hip injury near the end of camp, Acklin was released by the Ravens.

=== Hamilton Tiger-Cats ===
On March 20, 2019, Acklin signed with the Hamilton Tiger-Cats. He participated in both of the Ticats' preseason games, recording 10 receptions for 85 yards. Following preseason and training camp, Acklin began the 2019 season on the team's practice roster. Following an injury to Luke Tasker, Acklin was made a starting wide receiver and played in his first professional game on June 22, 2019 against the Toronto Argonauts where he had five catches for 59 yards. He scored his first CFL touchdown on July 4, 2019 against the Montreal Alouettes. Acklin was voted the team nominee for the Most Outstanding Rookie award for the East Division champion Tiger-Cats. Acklin re-signed with the Tiger-Cats on January 2, 2021. He became a free agent upon the expiry of his contract on February 8, 2022.

=== Ottawa Redblacks ===
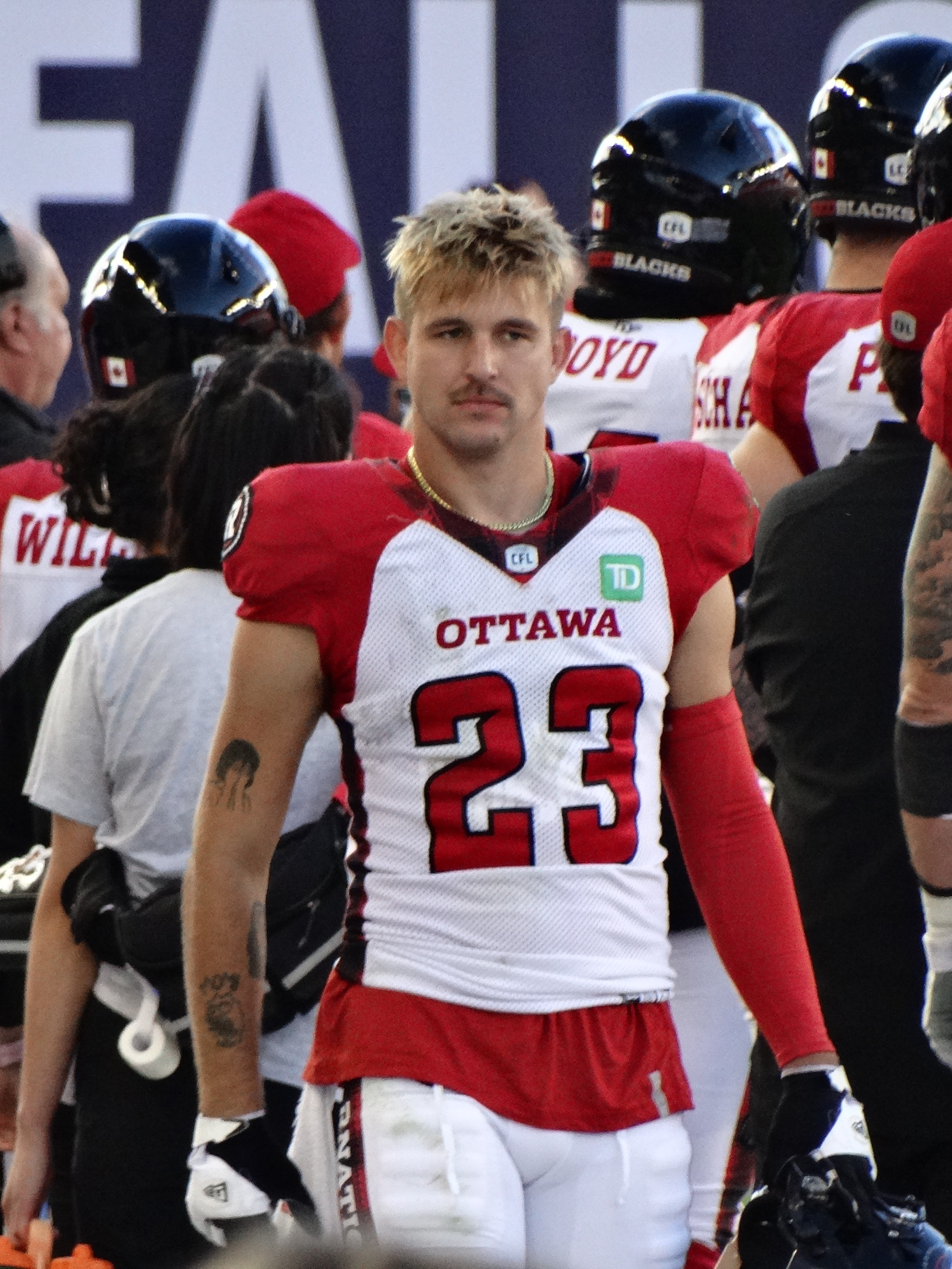
Acklin with the Redblacks in 2023

On February 9, 2022, it was announced that Acklin had signed with the Ottawa Redblacks. Acklin enjoyed a breakout season in 2022 with the Redblacks, despite inconsistent quarterback play he posted career highs in receptions, targets and yards. Acklin missed a few games at the end of the season after suffering head and shoulder injuries after an illegal hit from Montreal Alouettes’ linebacker Micah Awe. Following the season Acklin had a workout with the Denver Broncos of the National Football League (NFL). On May 12, 2023, Acklin signed a two-year contract extension with the Redblacks. On August 24, 2024, Acklin was forced to leave the game against the BC Lions on a stretcher after he went up for a catch and then crashed awkwardly to the turf. However, On the morning of August 25, 2024, the Redblacks sent out a message on social media saying Acklin had been released from the hospital and all scans were negative. He played in 16 games in 2024 where he had 69 receptions for 739 yards and four touchdowns. He announced his retirement on February 4, 2025.

== Career statistics ==
=== CFL ===
| Season info | | Receiving | | | | | |
| Year | Team | GP | Rec | Tar | Yds | YPC | TDs |
|---|---|---|---|---|---|---|---|
| 2019 | Hamilton | 17 | 58 | 74 | 708 | 12.3 | 3 |
| 2020 | Cancelled due to COVID-19 pandemic | | | | | | |
| 2021 | Hamilton | 14 | 50 | 77 | 678 | 13.6 | 4 |
| 2022 | Ottawa | 15 | 75 | 116 | 1,169 | 15.6 | 2 |
| 2023 | Ottawa | 18 | 67 | 99 | 892 | 13.3 | 1 |
| 2024 | Ottawa | 16 | 69 | 108 | 739 | 10.7 | 4 |
| Career totals | | 80 | 319 | 474 | 4,186 | 13.1 | 14 |

=== College ===
| | | | Receiving | | |
| Year | Team | GP | Rec | Yds | TDs |
|---|---|---|---|---|---|
| 2014 | Western Illinois | 8 | 1 | 4 | 0 |
| 2015 | Western Illinois | 13 | 12 | 168 | 2 |
| 2016 | Western Illinois | 11 | 8 | 192 | 0 |
| 2017 | Western Illinois | 12 | 84 | 1,369 | 10 |
| Totals | | 44 | 105 | 1,733 | 12 |

== Personal life ==
Acklin is the son of Darin and Tina Acklin. His dad played football at Carthage College. His uncle played football at Missouri and another relative played football at Avila.

In May 2024, Acklin welcomed a daughter into the world with his girlfriend Aynsley Cameron named Poppy Marie. The couple met in 2022 when the Redblacks were in Hamilton for a game. She was a server at Moxie's.
