= Marcus Tucker =

American gridiron football player (born 1992)

No. 15
- Position: Wide receiver

Personal information
- Born: June 24, 1992 (age 34); Flint, Michigan, U.S.
- Listed height: 5 ft 10 in (1.78 m)
- Listed weight: 190 lb (86 kg)

Career information
- High school: Grand Blanc (Grand Blanc, Michigan)
- College: Northern Michigan
- NFL draft: 2016: undrafted

Career history
- Pittsburgh Steelers (2016–2018)*; Hamilton Tiger-Cats (2019–2021)
- * Offseason or practice squad member only
- Stats at Pro Football Reference

Marcus Tucker (born June 24, 1992) is an American former professional football wide receiver. He played college football at Northern Michigan and signed with the Pittsburgh Steelers as an undrafted free agent in 2016.

== Professional career ==
=== Pittsburgh Steelers ===
Tucker signed with the Pittsburgh Steelers as an undrafted free agent on May 9, 2016. During the 2016 preseason, Tucker caught three passes for 23 yards. He was waived by the Steelers on September 3, 2016. On November 8, 2016, he was signed to the Steelers' practice squad. He signed a reserve/future contract with the Steelers on January 24, 2017.

On September 2, 2017, Tucker was waived by the Steelers, and was then signed to the practice squad the next day. He signed a reserve/future contract with the Steelers on January 16, 2018.

On September 1, 2018, Tucker was waived by the Steelers.

=== Hamilton Tiger-Cats ===
Tucker re-signed with the Hamilton Tiger-Cats on January 2, 2021.

== Coaching career ==
On June 21, 2023, Tucker was named head varsity football coach of the Westwood Patriots, a high school residing in Ishpeming, MI. The school is approx 17 miles west of Northern Michigan University, where Tucker played college football. Tucker replaced Jacob Wolf, who went 5-5 in his lone year as varsity football coach. Tucker is the first African American coach in the school's history.
