= Mike Jones (defensive back) =

American gridiron football player (born 1995)

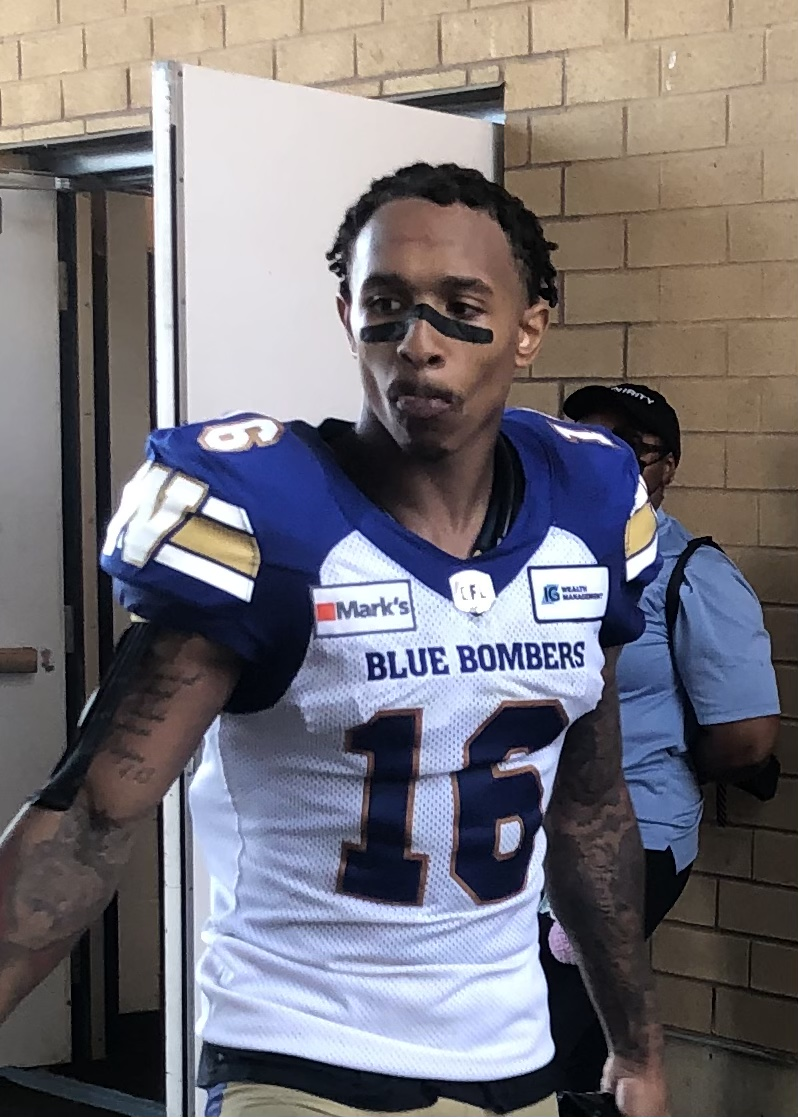
- Jones with the Winnipeg Blue Bombers in 2021

Profile
- Position: Defensive back

Personal information
- Born: September 1, 1995 (age 31); Baltimore, Maryland, U.S.
- Listed height: 5 ft 9 in (1.75 m)
- Listed weight: 185 lb (84 kg)

Career information
- College: North Carolina Central; Temple

Career history
- 2018: New York Giants*
- 2019–2021: Winnipeg Blue Bombers
- 2022: Montreal Alouettes
- 2023: BC Lions
- * Offseason or practice squad member only

Awards and highlights
- 2× Grey Cup champion (2019, 2021)
- Stats at CFL.ca

Mike Jones (born September 1, 1995) is an American professional football defensive back. He previously played in the Canadian Football League (CFL) for the Winnipeg Blue Bombers, Montreal Alouettes, and BC Lions.

== College career ==
Jones played college football for the North Carolina Central Eagles from 2013 to 2016 and the Temple Owls in 2017.

== Professional career ==
Pre-draft measurables
Height	Weight	Arm length	Hand span	Wingspan	40-yard dash	10-yard split	20-yard split	20-yard shuttle	Three-cone drill	Vertical jump	Broad jump	Bench press
5 ft 9 1/4 in (1.76 m)	187 lb (85 kg)	29 1/2 in (0.75 m)	9 3/4 in (0.25 m)	5 ft 11 1/2 in (1.82 m)	4.75 s	1.70 s	2.78 s	4.52 s	7.06 s	31.0 in (0.79 m)	9 ft 6 in (2.90 m)	15 reps
All values from Pro Day

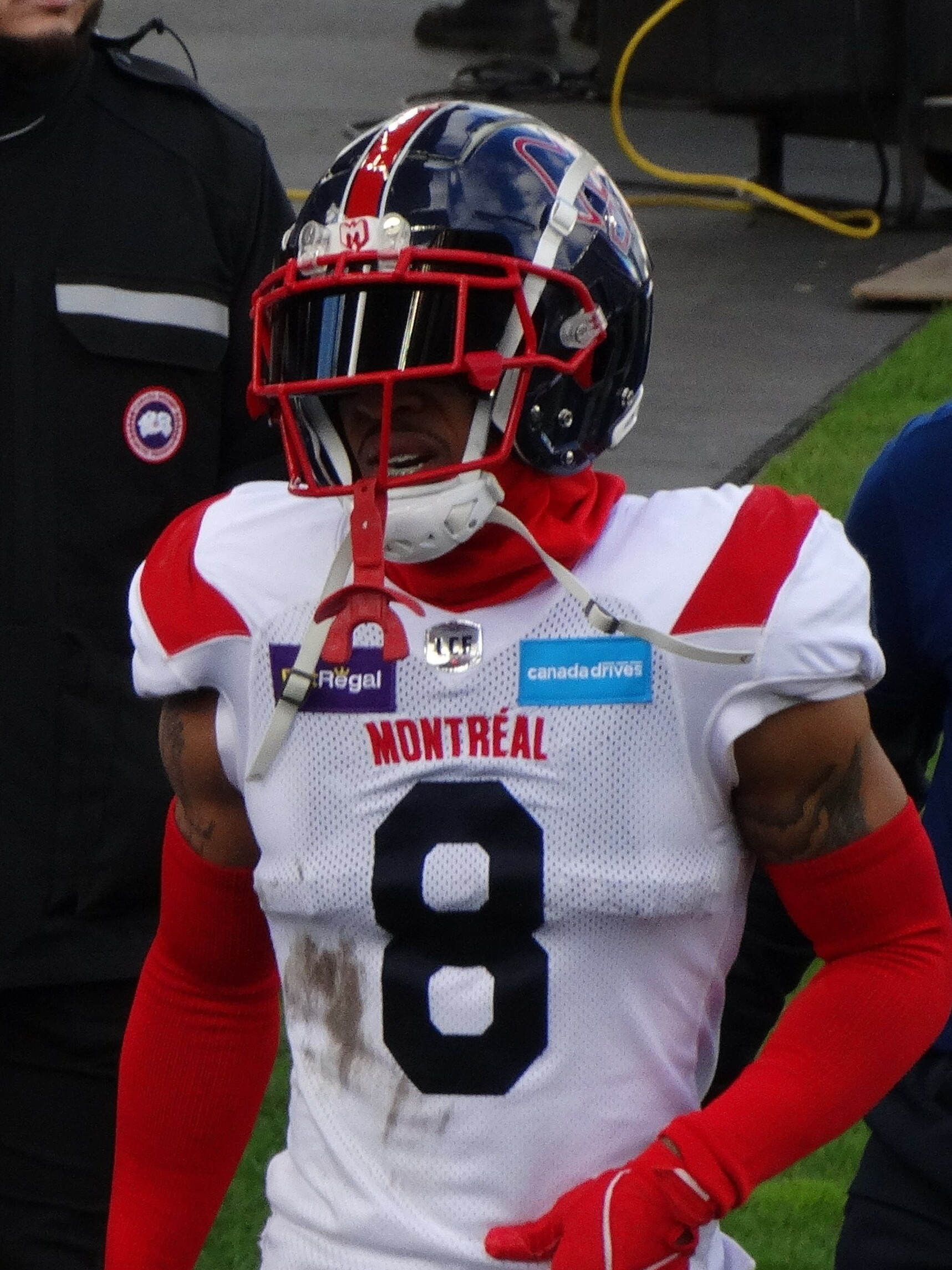
Jones with the Montreal Alouettes in 2022

=== New York Giants ===
Jones was originally signed as an undrafted free agent in 2018 by the New York Giants of the National Football League (NFL), but was released.

=== Winnipeg Blue Bombers ===
Jones signed with the Winnipeg Blue Bombers on April 29, 2019. After spending two seasons with the Blue Bombers, Jones won two Grey Cup championships with the team. He became a free agent upon the expiry of his contract on February 8, 2022.

=== Montreal Alouettes ===
On February 8, 2022, Jones signed with the Montreal Alouettes as a free agent. He played in all 18 regular season games where he had 47 defensive tackles, one special teams tackle, one interception, and one forced fumble. He became a free agent on February 14, 2023.

=== BC Lions ===
On February 16, 2023, it was announced that Jones had signed with the BC Lions. On February 13, 2024, Jones became a free agent, as his contract with the Lions was not renewed.
