= 2022 Winnipeg Blue Bombers season =

Canadian football team season

- General manager: Kyle Walters
- President: Wade Miller
- Head coach: Mike O'Shea
- Home stadium: IG Field

Results
- Record: 15–3
- Division place: 1st, West
- Playoffs: Lost Grey Cup
- Team MOP: Zach Collaros
- Team MODP: Willie Jefferson
- Team MOC: Nic Demski
- Team MOOL: Stanley Bryant
- Team MOST: Janarion Grant
- Team MOR: Dalton Schoen

Uniform
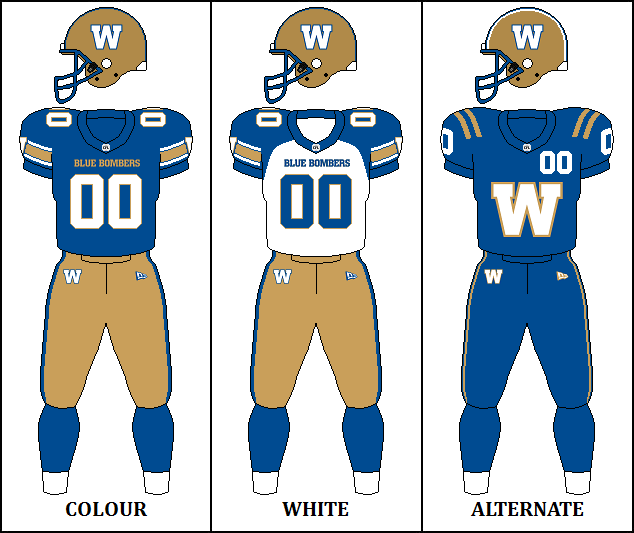

The 2022 Winnipeg Blue Bombers season was the 64th season for the team in the Canadian Football League (CFL) and their 89th season overall. The Blue Bombers entered the season as the two-time defending Grey Cup champions after winning both the 107th and 108th Grey Cup games. The team qualified for the playoffs following their 12th game of the season after defeating the Saskatchewan Roughriders in the Labour Day Classic on September 4, 2022. The team then clinched first place in the division in week 18 following their victory over the Edmonton Elks on October 8, 2022. The Blue Bombers reached the 109th Grey Cup, but were not able to perform the three-peat and lost to the Toronto Argonauts 24–23.

The 2022 CFL season was the eighth season under head coach Mike O'Shea and the eighth full season under general manager Kyle Walters.

== Offseason ==
=== Players lost ===
Position	Player	Tag	2022 Team	Date
RB	Andrew Harris	Released	Toronto Argonauts	February 8
WR	Darvin Adams	Released	Ottawa Redblacks	February 8
WR	Kenny Lawler	Released	Edmonton Elks	February 8
DT	Steven Richardson	Released	BC Lions	February 8
LB	Tobi Antigha	Released	Edmonton Elks	February 8
CB	Mike Jones	Released	Montreal Alouettes	February 8
K	Sergio Castillo	Released	Edmonton Elks	February 9
OL	Drew Desjarlais	Released	New England Patriots	January 27
LB	Jonathan Kongbo	Released	Denver Broncos	February 13
CB	Dee Alford	Released	Atlanta Falcons	February 8
OL	Asotui Eli	UFA	Free Agent	February 8
CB	Josh Miller	UFA	Free Agent	February 20
CB	Josh Johnson	UFA	Free Agent	February 25
LB	Kevin Brown II	UFA	Free Agent	February 20
QB	Sean McGuire	UFA	Retired	February 25
K	Tyler Crapigna	UFA	Retired	February 25

=== CFL global draft ===
The 2022 CFL global draft took place on May 3, 2022. With the format being a snake draft, the Blue Bombers selected sixth in the odd-numbered rounds and fourth in the even-numbered rounds.

Round	Pick	Player	Position	University/Club Team	Nationality
1	6	Tom Hackett	P	Utah	Australia
2	13	Souleymane Karamoko	DB	Laval	France
3	24	Michael Sleep-Dalton	P	Iowa	Australia

== CFL national draft ==
The 2022 CFL draft took place on May 3, 2022. The Blue Bombers were scheduled to have the last selection in each of the eight rounds of the draft after winning the Grey Cup in the previous season. However, the team had two fewer selection after acquiring Cameron Lawson from the Montreal Alouettes in a trade for a first-round pick and Sergio Castillo from the BC Lions for a third-round pick.

Round	Pick	Player	Position	University team	Hometown
2	13	Tyrell Ford	DB	Waterloo	Niagara Falls, ON
4	38	Cole Adamson	DL	Manitoba	Winnipeg, MB
5	47	Chris Ciguineau	DB	Ottawa	Montreal, QC
6	56	Jeremy Kapelanski	DL	Guelph	Saint-Jérôme, QC
7	65	Cedrick Lavigne	DB	Carleton	Gatineau, QC
8	74	Konner Burtenshaw	FB	Queen's	Amherstview, ON

== Preseason ==
=== Schedule ===
Week	Game	Date	Kickoff	Opponent	Results		TV	Venue	Attendance	Summary
Week	Game	Date	Kickoff	Opponent	Score	Record	TV	Venue	Attendance	Summary
A	1	Fri, May 27	7:30 p.m. CDT	vs. Edmonton Elks	L 20–30	0–1	None	IG Field	20,518	Recap
B	2	Tues, May 31	7:30 p.m. CDT	at Saskatchewan Roughriders	W 25–16	1–1	TSN	Mosaic Stadium	N/A	Recap

== Regular season ==
=== Standings ===
West Division
Team	GP	W	L	T	Pts	PF	PA	Div	Stk	
Winnipeg Blue Bombers	18	15	3	0	30	538	370	10–1	W1	Details
BC Lions	18	12	6	0	24	525	405	8–4	L1	Details
Calgary Stampeders	18	12	6	0	24	533	373	7–5	W2	Details
Saskatchewan Roughriders	18	6	12	0	12	370	440	3–8	L7	Details
Edmonton Elks	18	4	14	0	8	354	599	1–11	L4	Details

=== Schedule ===
Week	Game	Date	Kickoff	Opponent	Results		TV	Venue	Attendance	Summary
Week	Game	Date	Kickoff	Opponent	Score	Record	TV	Venue	Attendance	Summary
1	1	Fri, June 10	7:30 p.m. CDT	vs. Ottawa Redblacks	W 19–17	1–0	TSN	IG Field	26,002	Recap
2	2	Fri, June 17	6:30 p.m. CDT	at Ottawa Redblacks	W 19–12	2–0	TSN/RDS/ESPN2	TD Place Stadium	22,185	Recap
3	3	Fri, June 24	7:30 p.m. CDT	vs. Hamilton Tiger-Cats	W 26–12	3–0	TSN/ESPN2	IG Field	23,600	Recap
4	4	Mon, July 4	6:30 p.m. CDT	at Toronto Argonauts	W 23–22	4–0	TSN/RDS	BMO Field	9,806	Recap
5	5	Sat, July 9	6:00 p.m. CDT	at BC Lions	W 43–22	5–0	TSN/ESPNews	BC Place	17,603	Recap
6	6	Fri, July 15	7:30 p.m. CDT	vs. Calgary Stampeders	W 26–19	6–0	TSN/RDS	IG Field	29,746	Recap
7	7	Fri, July 22	8:00 p.m. CDT	at Edmonton Elks	W 24–10	7–0	TSN/ESPN2	Commonwealth Stadium	22,716	Recap
8	8	Sat, July 30	6:00 p.m. CDT	at Calgary Stampeders	W 35–28	8–0	TSN/RDS/ESPN2	McMahon Stadium	25,147	Recap
9	9	Thu, Aug 4	6:30 p.m. CDT	at Montreal Alouettes	W 35–20	9–0	TSN/RDS	Molson Stadium	17,093	Recap
10	10	Thu, Aug 11	7:30 p.m. CDT	vs. Montreal Alouettes	L 17–20 (OT)	9–1	TSN/RDS	IG Field	31,053	Recap
11	Bye									
12	11	Thu, Aug 25	7:30 p.m. CDT	vs. Calgary Stampeders	W 31–29	10–1	TSN	IG Field	30,062	Recap
13	12	Sun, Sept 4	5:00 p.m. CDT	at Saskatchewan Roughriders	W 20–18	11–1	TSN	Mosaic Stadium	33,350	Recap
14	13	Sat, Sept 10	4:00 p.m. CDT	vs. Saskatchewan Roughriders	W 54–20	12–1	TSN/RDS2	IG Field	33,234	Recap
15	14	Sat, Sept 17	3:00 p.m. CDT	at Hamilton Tiger-Cats	L 31–48	12–2	TSN/RDS	Tim Hortons Field	22,288	Recap
16	Bye									
17	15	Fri, Sept 30	7:00 p.m. CDT	vs. Saskatchewan Roughriders	W 31–13	13–2	TSN/RDS2	IG Field	33,224	Recap
18	16	Sat, Oct 8	6:00 p.m. CDT	vs. Edmonton Elks	W 48–11	14–2	TSN/RDS	IG Field	27,159	Recap
19	17	Sat, Oct 15	9:00 p.m. CDT	at BC Lions	L 32–40	14–3	TSN	BC Place	24,280	Recap
20	Bye									
21	18	Fri, Oct 28	7:30 p.m. CDT	vs. BC Lions	W 24–9	15–3	TSN	IG Field	23,685	Recap

== Post-season ==
=== Schedule ===
Game	Date	Kickoff	Opponent	Results		TV	Venue	Attendance	Summary
Game	Date	Kickoff	Opponent	Score	Record	TV	Venue	Attendance	Summary
West Semi-Final	Bye								
West Final	Sun, Nov 13	3:30 p.m. CST	vs. BC Lions	W 28–20	1–0	TSN/RDS/ESPNews	IG Field	30,319	Recap
109th Grey Cup	Sun, Nov 20	5:00 p.m. CST	Toronto Argonauts	L 23–24	1–1	TSN/RDS/ESPN2	Mosaic Stadium	33,350	Recap

== Roster ==
2022 Winnipeg Blue Bombers final roster
**Quarterbacks**: 6 Dru Brown; 8 Zach Collaros; 12 Dakota Prukop; **Running backs**: 27 Johnny Augustine; 32 Konner Burtenshaw; 24 Mike Miller; 20 Brady Oliveira; **Receivers**: 88 Rasheed Bailey; 10 Nic Demski; 2 Greg Ellingson; 80 Janarion Grant; 84 Brendan O'Leary-Orange; 83 Dalton Schoen; 82 Drew Wolitarsky	**Offensive linemen**: 66 Stanley Bryant T; 59 Michael Couture C; 61 Liam Dobson G/C; 68 Geoff Gray G/T; 51 Jermarcus Hardrick T; 67 Chris Kolankowski C/G; 53 Patrick Neufeld G; **Defensive linemen**: 94 Jackson Jeffcoat DE; 5 Willie Jefferson DE; 99 Cameron Lawson DT; 90 Casey Sayles DT; 95 Jake Thomas DT; 96 Ricky Walker DT; **Special teams**: 40 Mike Benson LS; 13 Marc Liegghio P/K	**Linebackers**: 4 Adam Bighill; 34 Jesse Briggs; 47 Tanner Cadwallader; 0 Malik Clements; 41 Brian Cole II; 44 Shayne Gauthier; 54 Les Maruo; **Defensive backs**: 37 Brandon Alexander; 22 Alden Darby; 25 Tyrell Ford; 21 Nick Hallett; 31 Evan Holm; 46 Des Lawrence; 1 Deatrick Nichols; 45 Jamal Parker; 30 Winston Rose	**Practice roster**: 15 DeJuan Cooper LB; 14 Jaivon Heiligh WR; 42 Souleymane Karamoko DB; 89 Timothy Knüttel WR; 26 Cedrick Lavigne DB; 55 Eric Lofton OL; 87 Luke McMillan WR; 18 Ali Mourtada K; 38 Donald Rutledge DB; 50 Tyler Witt OL; **Suspended list**: Vance Barnes RB; Tom Hackett P; Tyrique McGhee DB	**Injured list**: 54 Keion Adams DE; 86 Carlton Agudosi WR; 23 Noah Hallett DB; 3 Thiadric Hansen DL; 35 Demerio Houston DB; 17 Redha Kramdi LB; 69 Tomoya Machino OL; 7 Mercy Maston DB; 29 Greg McCrae SB; 39 Patrice Rene DB; 60 Drew Richmond OL; 9 Nick Taylor DB; 36 Malcolm Thompson DB; 19 Kyrie Wilson LB
Italics indicate American player • **Bold** indicates Global player

== Coaching staff ==
Winnipeg Blue Bombers staff
Front office: Owner – Winnipeg Football Club; Chairperson of the board of governors – Dayna Spiring; President/CEO – Wade Miller; General manager of football operations – Kyle Walters; Senior assistant general manager / director of player personnel – Ted Goveia; Assistant General Manager / Director of U.S. Scouting – Danny McManus; Director of football operations – Matt Gulakow; U.S. Scout — Cyril Penn; Equipment staff: Head equipment manager – Brad Fotty; Assistant equipment manager – Kevin Todd	Head coaches: Head coach – Mike O'Shea; Offensive coaches: Offensive coordinator and quarterbacks – Buck Pierce; Receivers – Kevin Bourgoin; Running backs – Jason Hogan; Offensive line – Marty Costello; Defensive coaches: Defensive coordinator – Richie Hall; Defensive line – Darrell Patterson; Defensive backs – Jordan Younger; Pass game analyst and linebackers – James Stanley; Special teams coaches: Special teams coordinator – Paul Boudreau, Jr.; Video coaches: Video coordinator – Josh Burton; → Coaching staff
