= 2021 Winnipeg Blue Bombers season =

Canadian football team season

- General manager: Kyle Walters
- Head coach: Mike O'Shea
- Home stadium: IG Field

Results
- Record: 11–3
- Division place: 1st, West
- Playoffs: Won Grey Cup
- Team MOP: Zach Collaros
- Team MODP: Adam Bighill
- Team MOC: Nic Demski
- Team MOOL: Stanley Bryant
- Team MOST: Mike Miller
- Team MOR: DeAundre Alford

Uniform
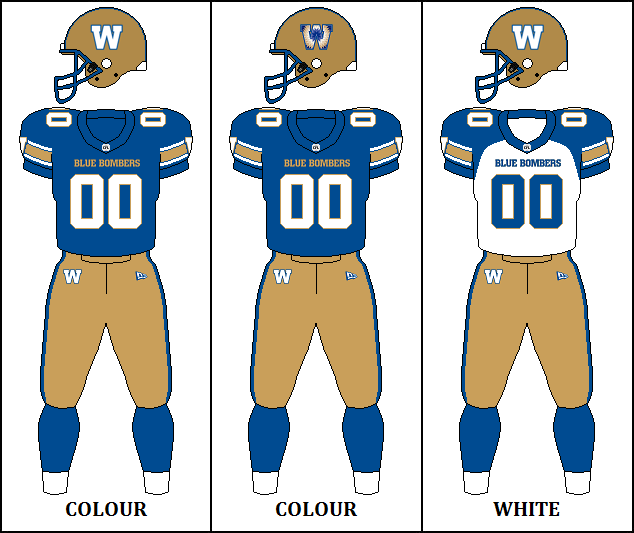

The 2021 Winnipeg Blue Bombers season was the 63rd season for the team in the Canadian Football League (CFL) and their 88th season overall. The Blue Bombers entered the season as the defending Grey Cup champions for the first time in 30 years, having ended the franchise's lengthy drought with last year's championship win in the 107th Grey Cup game. The Blue Bombers qualified for the playoffs for the fifth consecutive season following a victory over the Edmonton Elks on October 16, 2021. The team won their first division title since 2011, and first west division title since 1972, after they defeated the BC Lions on October 23, 2021.

The Blue Bombers won the 12th Grey Cup championship in franchise history following their 33–25 overtime victory over the Hamilton Tiger-Cats in the 108th Grey Cup game.

This was the seventh season under head coach Mike O'Shea and the seventh full season under general manager Kyle Walters.

An 18-game season schedule was originally released on November 20, 2020, but it was announced on April 21, 2021, that the start of the season would likely be delayed until August and feature a 14-game schedule. On June 15, 2021, the league released the revised 14-game schedule with regular season play beginning on August 5, 2021.

== Offseason ==
=== CFL global draft ===
The 2021 CFL global draft took place on April 15, 2021. With the format being a snake draft, the Blue Bombers selected fourth in the odd-numbered rounds and sixth in the even-numbered rounds.

Round	Pick	Player	Position	University/Club Team	Nationality
1	4	Les Maruo	LB	Texas, San Antonio	Japan
2	15	Tomoya Machino	OL	Fujitsu Frontiers	Japan
3	22	Ayo Oyelola	LB	Nottingham	(United Kingdom) Great Britain
4	33	Arryn Siposs	P	Auburn	Australia

== CFL national draft ==
The 2021 CFL draft took place on May 4, 2021. The Blue Bombers had six selections in the six-round snake draft and had the third pick in odd rounds and the seventh pick in even rounds.

Round	Pick	Player	Position	University team	Hometown
1	3	Liam Dobson	OL	Maine	Ottawa, ON
2	16	Redha Kramdi	DB	Montreal	Montreal, QC
3	21	Patrice Rene	DB	North Carolina	Ottawa, ON
4	34	Robbie Lowes	LB	Regina	Regina, SK
5	39	Kyle Borsa	RB	Regina	Regina, SK
6	48	Shae Weekes	DB	Manitoba	St. Adolphe, MB

== Preseason ==
Due to the shortening of the season, the CFL confirmed that pre-season games would not be played in 2021.

=== Planned schedule ===
Week	Game	Date	Kickoff	Opponent	TV	Venue
A	Bye					
B	1	Fri, May 28	7:30 p.m. CDT	vs. Saskatchewan Roughriders	NA	IG Field
C	2	Fri, June 4	8:00 p.m. CDT	at Saskatchewan Roughriders	NA	Mosaic Stadium

== Regular season ==
=== Standings ===
West Division
Team	GP	W	L	T	Pts	PF	PA	Div	Stk	
Winnipeg Blue Bombers	14	11	3	0	22	351	187	8–1	L2	Details
Saskatchewan Roughriders	14	9	5	0	18	290	285	5–4	L1	Details
Calgary Stampeders	14	8	6	0	16	315	263	6–4	W3	Details
BC Lions	14	5	9	0	10	313	351	2–7	W1	Details
Edmonton Elks	14	3	11	0	6	246	377	2–7	L1	Details

=== Schedule ===
The Blue Bombers initially had a schedule that featured 18 regular season games beginning on June 10 and ending on October 30. However, due to the COVID-19 pandemic in Canada, the Canadian Football League delayed the start of the regular season to August 5, 2021, and the Blue Bombers began their 14-game season that same day.

Week	Game	Date	Kickoff	Opponent	Results		TV	Venue	Attendance	Summary
Week	Game	Date	Kickoff	Opponent	Score	Record	TV	Venue	Attendance	Summary
1	1	Thu, Aug 5	7:30 p.m. CDT	Hamilton Tiger-Cats	W 19–6	1–0	TSN/ESPN2	IG Field	29,376	Recap
2	2	Fri, Aug 13	7:30 p.m. CDT	Toronto Argonauts	W 20–7	2–0	TSN/RDS	IG Field	22,143	Recap
3	3	Sat, Aug 21	3:00 p.m. CDT	@ Toronto Argonauts	L 23–30	2–1	TSN/ESPN2	BMO Field	9,866	Recap
4	4	Sun, Aug 29	6:00 p.m. CDT	Calgary Stampeders	W 18–16	3–1	TSN/RDS/ESPN2	IG Field	22,806	Recap
5	5	Sun, Sept 5	5:00 p.m. CDT	@ Saskatchewan Roughriders	W 23–8	4–1	TSN/ESPNews	Mosaic Stadium	32,975	Recap
6	6	Sat, Sept 11	3:00 p.m. CDT	Saskatchewan Roughriders	W 33–9	5–1	TSN	IG Field	33,234	Recap
7	7	Sat, Sept 18	8:45 p.m. CDT	@ Edmonton Elks	W 37–22	6–1	TSN	Commonwealth Stadium	23,310	Recap
8	Bye									
9	8	Fri, Oct 1	9:00 p.m. CDT	@ BC Lions	W 30–9	7–1	TSN/ESPNews	BC Place	12,500	Recap
10	9	Fri, Oct 8	7:30 p.m. CDT	Edmonton Elks	W 30–3	8–1	TSN/RDS2	IG Field	27,388	Recap
11	10	Fri, Oct 15	8:00 p.m. CDT	@ Edmonton Elks	W 23–16	9–1	TSN	Commonwealth Stadium	24,276	Recap
12	11	Sat, Oct 23	6:00 p.m. CDT	BC Lions	W 45–0	10–1	TSN	IG Field	23,750	Recap
13	Bye									
14	12	Sat, Nov 6	6:00 p.m. CDT	Montreal Alouettes	W 31–21	11–1	TSN/RDS	IG Field	22,933	Recap
15	13	Sat, Nov 13	12:00 p.m. CST	@ Montreal Alouettes	L 14–28	11–2	TSN/RDS	Molson Stadium	12,605	Recap
16	14	Sat, Nov 20	6:00 p.m. CST	@ Calgary Stampeders	L 12–13	11–3	TSN	McMahon Stadium	19,103	Recap

== Post-season ==
=== Schedule ===
Game	Date	Kickoff	Opponent	Results		TV	Venue	Attendance	Summary
Game	Date	Kickoff	Opponent	Score	Record	TV	Venue	Attendance	Summary
West Semi-Final	Bye								
West Final	Sun, Dec 5	3:00 p.m. CST	Saskatchewan Roughriders	W 21–17	1–0	TSN/RDS/ESPN2	IG Field	31,160	Recap
108th Grey Cup	Sun, Dec 12	5:00 p.m. CST	Hamilton Tiger-Cats	W 33–25 (OT)	2–0	TSN/RDS/ESPN2	Tim Hortons Field	26,324	Recap

== Roster ==
2021 Winnipeg Blue Bombers final roster
**Quarterbacks**: 8 Zach Collaros; 12 Sean McGuire; **Running backs**: 27 Johnny Augustine; 33 Andrew Harris; 24 Mike Miller; 20 Brady Oliveira; **Receivers**: 1 Darvin Adams; 88 Rasheed Bailey; 10 Nic Demski; 80 Janarion Grant; 89 Kenny Lawler; 84 Brendan O'Leary-Orange; 82 Drew Wolitarsky	**Offensive linemen**: 66 Stanley Bryant T; 59 Michael Couture C; 61 Drew Desjarlais G; 68 Geoff Gray G/T; 51 Jermarcus Hardrick T; 67 Chris Kolankowski C; 53 Patrick Neufeld G/T; **Defensive linemen**: 3 Thiadric Hansen DE; 94 Jackson Jeffcoat DE; 5 Willie Jefferson DE; 2 Jonathan Kongbo DE; 98 Steven Richardson DT; 90 Casey Sayles DT; 95 Jake Thomas DT; 96 Ricky Walker DT	**Linebackers**: 4 Adam Bighill; 34 Jesse Briggs; 47 Tanner Cadwallader; 44 Shayne Gauthier; 19 Kyrie Wilson; **Defensive backs**: 37 Brandon Alexander; 45 Dee Alford; 22 Alden Darby; 21 Nick Hallett; 43 Redha Kramdi; 25 Josh Miller; 32 Deatrick Nichols; 30 Winston Rose; 9 Nick Taylor	**Special teams**: 40 Mike Benson LS; 14 Sergio Castillo K; 13 Marc Liegghio P/K; **Practice Roster**: 86 Carlton Agudosi WR; 18 Dru Brown QB; 52 Jalen Burks T; 38 Shaq Cooper RB; 35 Demerio Houston DB; 39 Robbie Lowes LB; 69 Tomoya Machino G; 54 Les Maruo LB; 87 Kelvin McKnight SB; 42 Ali Mourtada K; 6 Charles Nelson SB; 55 Ayo Oyelola LB; 26 Sergio Schiaffino DB; 83 James Tyrrell SB	**Injured List**: 15 Tobi Antigha LB; 41 Kevin Brown LB; 14 Tyler Crapigna K; 23 Noah Hallett DB; 0 Josh Johnson DB; 16 Mike Jones DB; 7 Mercy Maston DB; 60 Drew Richmond T; 50 Ezekiel Rose DT; **Suspended list**: -- Joshua Caldwell RB; -- Greg Ducre DB; 65 Asotui Eli G/C; -- Connor Griffiths DT; -- Zach Houghron DT; -- Malcolm Lewis WR; -- Dexter McDougle DB; -- Mekale McKay WR; -- Mason Moe LB; -- James Williams RB
Italics indicate American player • **Bold** indicates Global player

== Coaching staff ==
Winnipeg Blue Bombers staff
Front office: Owner – None; Chairperson of the board of governors – Dayna Spiring; President/CEO – Wade Miller; General manager of football operations – Kyle Walters; Assistant General Manager / Director of U.S. Scouting – Danny McManus; Assistant general manager / director of player personnel – Ted Goveia; Director of football operations – Matt Gulakow; Equipment staff: Head equipment manager – Brad Fotty; Assistant equipment manager – Kevin Todd	Head coaches: Head coach – Mike O'Shea; Offensive coaches: Offensive coordinator and quarterbacks – Buck Pierce; Receivers – Kevin Bourgoin; Running backs – Pete Costanza; Offensive line – Marty Costello; Defensive coaches: Defensive coordinator – Richie Hall; Defensive line – Darrell Patterson; Defensive backs – Jordan Younger; Pass game analyst and linebackers – James Stanley; Special teams coaches: Special teams coordinator – Paul Boudreau, Jr.; Video coaches: Video coordinator – Colin Thurston; Video assistant – Shannon Myran; → Coaching staff
