= Malik Clements =

American gridiron football player (born 1996)

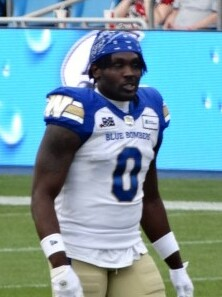
- Clements with the Winnipeg Blue Bombers in 2022

No. 0
- Position: Linebacker

Personal information
- Born: October 4, 1996 (age 30); Danville, Virginia, U.S.
- Listed height: 6 ft 0 in (1.83 m)
- Listed weight: 224 lb (102 kg)

Career information
- College: Cincinnati

Career history
- 2020–2021: Edmonton Elks
- 2022–2023: Winnipeg Blue Bombers
- 2024: Toronto Argonauts*
- * Offseason or practice squad member only
- Stats at CFL.ca

Malik Clements (born October 4, 1996) is an American former professional former linebacker who played in the Canadian Football League (CFL).

== College career ==
Clements played college football for the Cincinnati Bearcats from 2015 to 2018. He played in 34 games where he had 187 total tackles, nine for loss, two sacks, two forced fumbles, one fumble recovery, and one interception.

== Professional career ==
=== Edmonton Elks ===
Clements signed with the Edmonton Elks on January 24, 2020, but did not play that year due to the cancellation of the 2020 CFL season. He made the team following training camp in 2021 and played in his first career professional game on August 7, 2021, against the Ottawa Redblacks. He played in seven regular season games where he had 11 defensive tackles and two special teams tackles. Following a head coaching change by the team, Clements was released in the following offseason on February 17, 2022.

=== Winnipeg Blue Bombers ===
On March 4, 2022, it was announced that Clements had signed with the Winnipeg Blue Bombers. He began the year as a backup, but became the team's starting weak-side linebacker following an injury to Kyrie Wilson. He played in 12 regular season games in 2022 where he had 31 defensive tackles, four special teams tackles, and one sack.

Clements became a free agent upon the expiry of his contract on February 13, 2024.

=== Toronto Argonauts ===
On February 14, 2024, it was announced that Clements had signed with the Toronto Argonauts. He retired on May 12, 2024.
