= Redha Kramdi =

Canadian gridiron football player (born 1996)

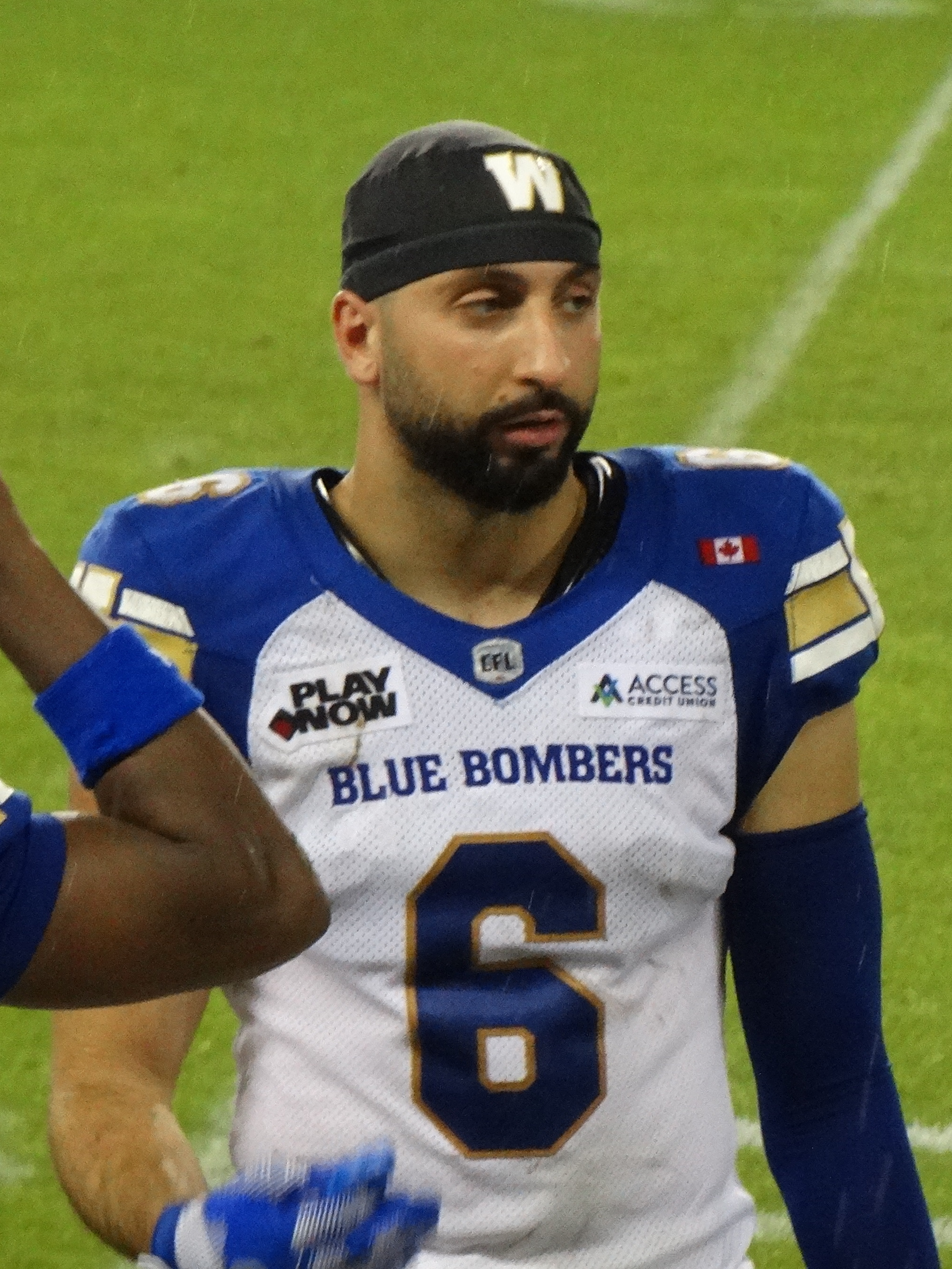
- Kramdi with the Winnipeg Blue Bombers in 2025

No. 6 – Winnipeg Blue Bombers
- Position: Linebacker
- Roster status: Active
- CFL status: National

Personal information
- Born: December 22, 1996 (age 29); Montreal, Quebec, Canada
- Listed height: 5 ft 11 in (1.80 m)
- Listed weight: 189 lb (86 kg)

Career information
- University: Montréal
- CFL draft: 2021: 2nd round, 16th overall pick

Career history
- 2021–present: Winnipeg Blue Bombers

Awards and highlights
- Grey Cup champion (2021)
- Stats at CFL.ca

Redha Kramdi (born December 22, 1996) is a Canadian professional football linebacker for the Winnipeg Blue Bombers of the Canadian Football League (CFL). He is a Grey Cup champion after winning with the Blue Bombers in 2021.

== Early life ==
Kramdi is the son of Algerian parents and was initially attending F.A.C.E. School in Montreal, a fine arts grade school his parents wanted him to attend. Though he liked the school, he was not all that into the arts and asked his parents if he could attend École secondaire Dalbé-Viau in the borough of Lachine instead, in order to play his preferred sport of football.

== University career ==
Kramdi played U Sports football for the Montreal Carabins.

== Professional career ==
Kramdi was drafted in the second round, 16th overall by the Winnipeg Blue Bombers in the 2021 CFL draft. He played in seven regular season games in 2021 where he had one special teams tackle. He also played in both post-season games, including his first Grey Cup game where the Blue Bombers defeated the Hamilton Tiger-Cats 33–25 in the 108th Grey Cup game.

In 2022, Kramdi played in 17 regular season games, starting in one, where he had nine defensive tackles and seven special teams tackles. In the 2023 season, he established himself as a starter as he played in 14 games, starting in 11, where he had 22 defensive tackles, six special teams tackles, four pass knockdowns, and two sacks. He played in the 109th Grey Cup game where he had two defensive tackles and one pass knockdown in the team's loss to the Toronto Argonauts.

In 2024, Kramdi played and started in all 18 regular season games where he had 59 defensive tackles, two special teams tackles, two sacks, and five pass knockdowns. He also played and started in the team's two post-season games that year, including the 111th Grey Cup where he had two defensive tackles as the Argonauts defeated the Blue Bombers 41–24.
