= Malcolm Thompson (Canadian football) =

Canadian gridiron football player (born 1995)

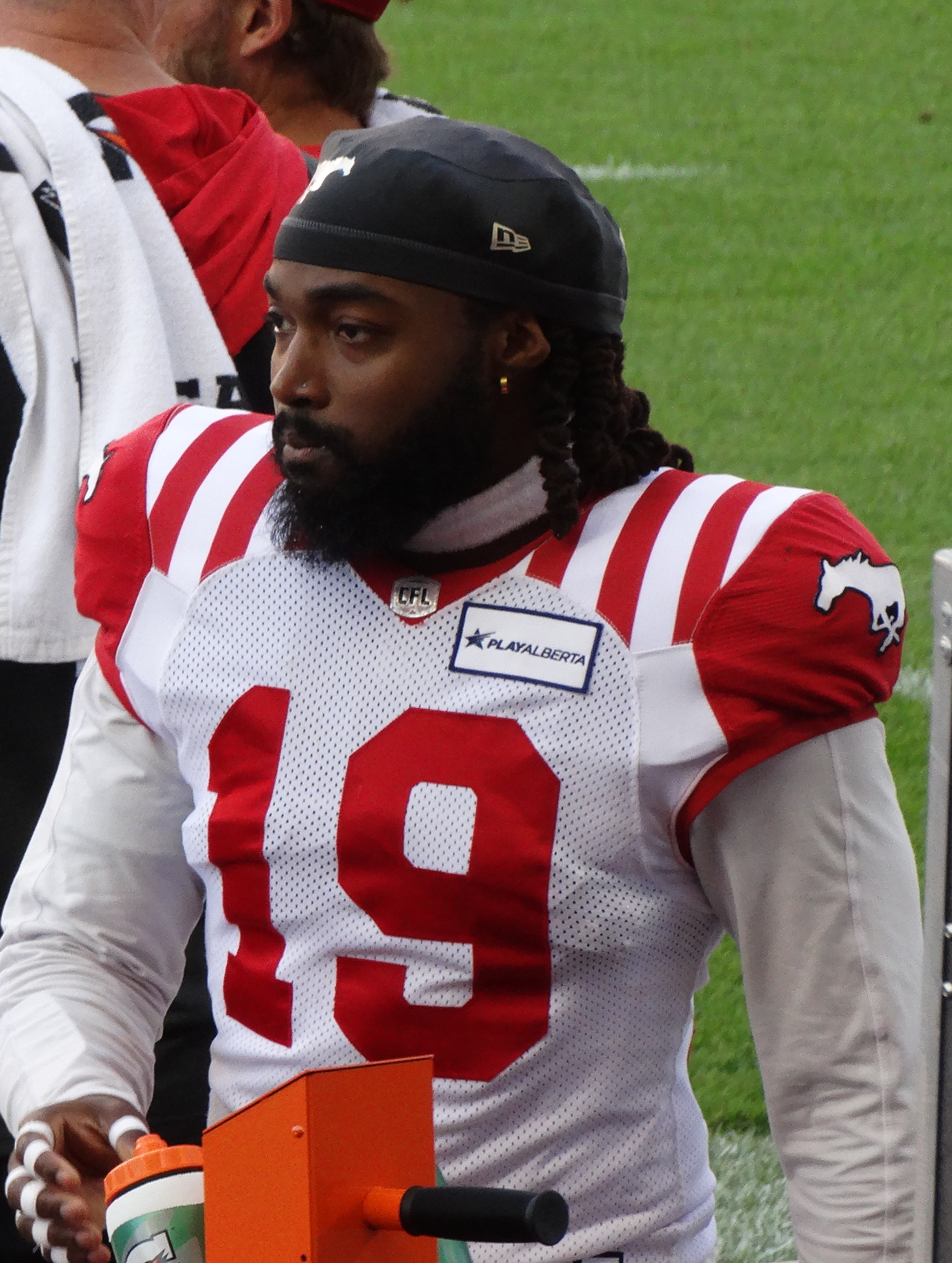
- Thompson with the Calgary Stampeders in 2024

Profile
- Position: Defensive back

Personal information
- Born: September 12, 1995 (age 31); Windsor, Ontario, Canada
- Listed height: 5 ft 10 in (1.78 m)
- Listed weight: 195 lb (88 kg)

Career information
- High school: Holy Names High
- University: Wilfrid Laurier
- CFL draft: 2019: undrafted

Career history
- 2020: Calgary Stampeders*
- 2021: Hamilton Tiger-Cats
- 2022: Winnipeg Blue Bombers
- 2023–2024: Calgary Stampeders
- * Offseason or practice squad member only

Awards and highlights
- Yates Cup champion (2016); First-team All-Canadian (2016)
- Stats at CFL.ca

Malcolm Thompson (born September 12, 1995) is a Canadian professional football defensive back. He previously played in the Canadian Football League (CFL).

== University career ==
Thompson played U Sports football for the Wilfrid Laurier Golden Hawks from 2014 to 2019. Before his university career began, Thompson tore his ACL while playing in the summer of 2014 with the Essex Ravens. After sitting out the 2014 season, he returned to play in 2015 for the Golden Hawks where he was named a Second Team OUA All-Star. In his second season, in 2016, he was named a U Sports First Team All-Canadian, but his season was cut short when he suffered another torn ACL in a game against the Guelph Gryphons on October 15, 2016.

After sitting out the 2017 season, Thompson returned in 2018. Following a lacklustre season, he was not selected in the 2019 CFL draft and returned to play for the Golden Hawks. In 2019, he returned to form as he played without a knee brace and was named a Second-Team OUA All-Star. He played in 31 games with the Golden Hawks where he had 120.5 tackles, nine interceptions, two sacks, eight pass knockdowns, one forced fumble, two fumble recoveries and 4 defensive touchdowns.

== Professional career ==
=== Calgary Stampeders (first stint) ===
On November 27, 2019, Thompson signed with the Calgary Stampeders as an undrafted free agent. However, he did not play in 2020 due to the cancellation of the 2020 CFL season. He attended training camp with the Stampeders in 2021, but was released on July 29, 2021.

=== Hamilton Tiger-Cats ===
On November 1, 2021, it was announced that Thompson had signed with the Hamilton Tiger-Cats. Soon after, he played in his first career professional game on November 5, 2021, against the BC Lions, where he recorded one special teams tackle. He played in two regular season games for the team and did not play in the post-season where the Tiger-Cats lost the 108th Grey Cup to the Winnipeg Blue Bombers. Since he finished the season on the practice roster, he became a free agent on the day following the Grey Cup, on December 13, 2021.

=== Winnipeg Blue Bombers ===
Thompson signed with the Winnipeg Blue Bombers for the 2022 season as it was announced on January 5, 2022. Due to an injury to the team's starting safety, Brandon Alexander, Thompson earned his first career start in the team's opening game of 2022 against the Ottawa Redblacks, where he recorded two defensive tackles and one special teams tackle in the Blue Bombers' victory. He played in the team's first seven games as the starting safety before suffering an injury and being placed on the injured list. On December 5, 2022, Thompson became a free agent.

=== Calgary Stampeders (second stint) ===
On September 16, 2023, Thompson signed a practice roster agreement with the Stampeders. He played in 20 regular season games over two years for the Stampeders where he recorded nine defensive tackles and nine special teams tackles. He became a free agent upon the expiry of his contract on February 11, 2025.
