= Noah Hallett =

Canadian gridiron football player (born 1997)

- Hallett with the McMaster Marauders in 2026

McMaster Marauders
- Title: Defensive assistant
- CFL status: National

Personal information
- Born: September 20, 1997 (age 29); London, Ontario
- Listed height: 6 ft 0 in (1.83 m)
- Listed weight: 188 lb (85 kg)

Career information
- Position: Defensive back
- University: McMaster
- CFL draft: 2020: 2nd round, 18th overall pick

Career history

Playing
- 2021–2024: Winnipeg Blue Bombers

Coaching
- 2026–present: McMaster Marauders

Career CFL statistics
- Games played: 23
- Special teams tackles: 12
- Stats at CFL.ca

Noah Hallett (born September 9, 1997) is a Canadian former professional football defensive back and he is a defensive assistant coach for the McMaster Marauders of U Sports football. He played in four seasons for the Winnipeg Blue Bombers of the Canadian Football League (CFL).

== University career ==
Hallett played U Sports football for the McMaster Marauders from 2016 to 2019.

== Professional career ==
Hallett was drafted by the Winnipeg Blue Bombers in the second round (18th overall) of the 2020 CFL draft. However, he did not play in 2020 due to the cancellation of the 2020 CFL season. Instead, he signed with the team on January 7, 2021, and made his professional debut in the team's opening game on August 5, 2021, against the Hamilton Tiger-Cats. He played in nine regular season games in 2021, starting in two, where he had one defensive tackle, four special teams tackles, and one fumble recovery. After suffering a knee injury on November 13, 2021, Hallett was on the injured list when the Blue Bombers defeated the Hamilton Tiger-Cats in the 108th Grey Cup.

In 2022, Hallett began the first 12 games on the injured list as he rehabilitated his knee injury that he suffered from the previous year. He played in two regular season games where he had two special teams tackles. On May 13, 2023, Hallett was released by the Blue Bombers after failing a physical examination. Hallett returned to the Bombers on October 17, 2023, but did not play in a regular season game. He re-signed with the team on February 1, 2024.

Hallett played in 12 regular season games in 2024 where he had six special teams tackles. He also made his post-season debut as he played in the West Final win over the Saskatchewan Roughriders. He was on the injured list for the 111th Grey Cup game where the Blue Bombers lost to the Toronto Argonauts. He became a free agent in the following offseason on February 11, 2025.

== Coaching career ==
Hallett joined the coaching staff for the McMaster Marauders in 2026 as a defensive assistant coach.

== Personal life ==
Hallett's brother, Nick, was drafted by the Blue Bombers in the seventh round of the 2019 CFL draft.
