= Steinbrenner High School =

George M. Steinbrenner High School

Location
- 5575 West Lutz Lake Fern Road; Lutz, Florida 33558; United States; 28°09′29″N 82°32′01″W

Information
- Type: Public
- Opened: 2009
- School district: Hillsborough County Public Schools
- Principal: Tiffany Ewell
- Teaching staff: 99.00 (FTE)
- Grades: 9–12
- Enrollment: 2,430 (2023–2024)
- Student to teacher ratio: 24.55
- Colors: Navy blue, Athletic gold
- Nickname: Warriors
- Newspaper: The Oracle
- Yearbook: The Odyssey
- Website: www.hillsboroughschools.org/o/steinbrenner

George M. Steinbrenner High School is a public high school in Lutz, Florida, United States. It is located adjacent to McKitrick Elementary and Martinez Middle School. The school was named in honor of late New York Yankees owner George Steinbrenner, a Tampa resident. Steinbrenner opened August 25, 2009, with about 1600 students.

== Extracurriculars ==
Steinbrenner High School offers many extracurricular opportunities, including orchestra, band, jazz band, and choir.

== Athletics ==
Sports offered at Steinbrenner include:

- Football
- Flag Football (girls)
- Volleyball
- Cheerleading
- Swimming (boys' and girls' teams)
- Cross Country (boys' and girls' teams)
- Golf (boys' and girls' teams)
- Basketball (boys' and girls' teams)
- Soccer (boys' and girls' teams)
- Wrestling
- Baseball
- Softball
- Track (boys' and girls' teams)
- Tennis (boys' and girls' teams)
- Lacrosse (boys' and girls' teams)

In the 2010–2011 season, the girls' soccer team won the class 4A State Championship.

In the 2016 season, the girls' cross country team won the 4A State Championship.

In the 2016 season, the baseball team won the class 8A State Championship.

In the 2019 season, the boys' cross country team won the 4A State Championship.

== Notable alumni ==
- Tobi Antigha (2011), football player.
- CJ Van Eyk (2017), baseball player.
