= Shayne Gauthier =

Canadian gridiron football player (born 1992)

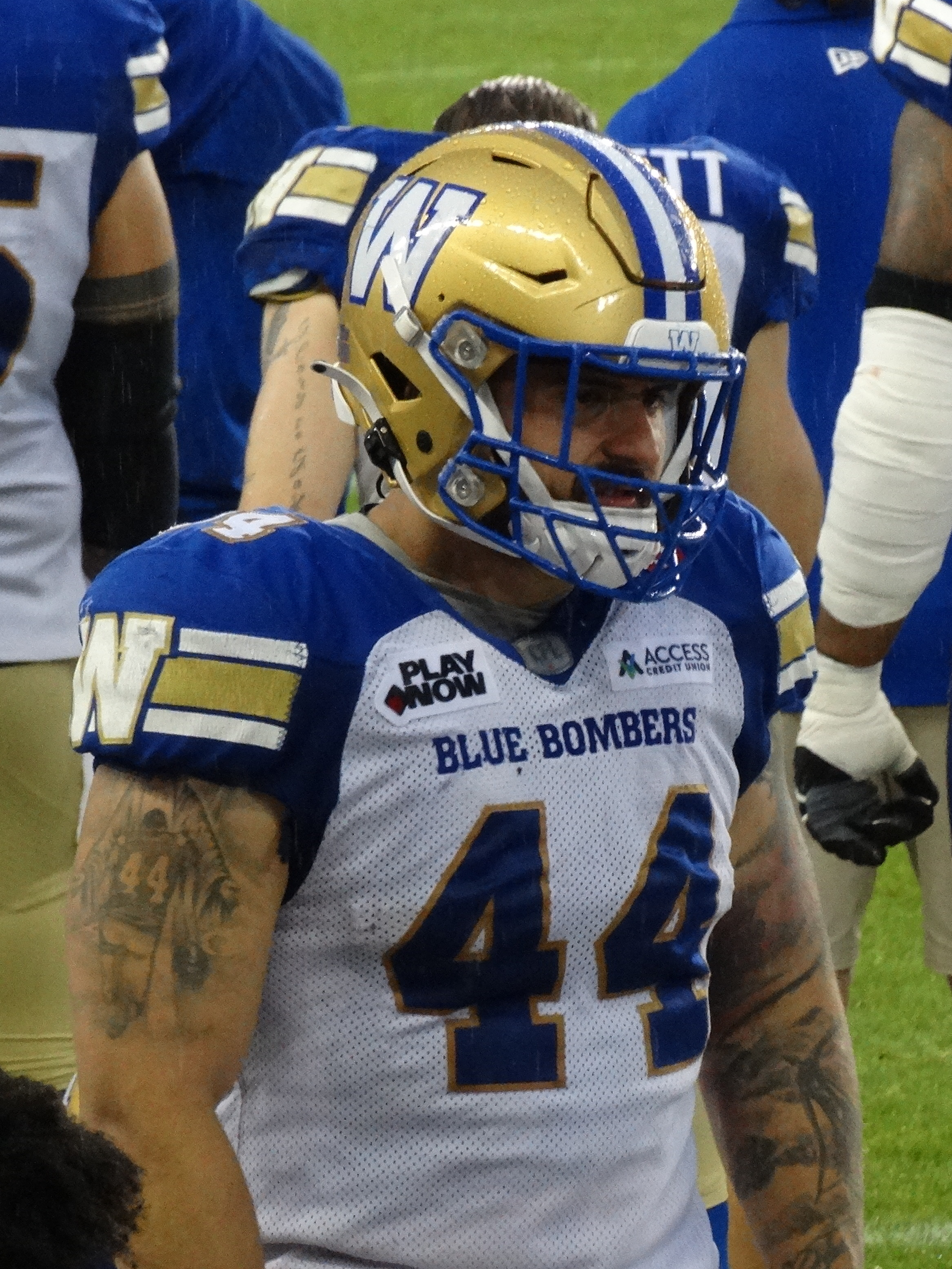
- Gauthier with the Winnipeg Blue Bombers in 2025

Profile
- Position: Linebacker

Personal information
- Born: February 20, 1992 (age 34); Dolbeau-Mistassini, Quebec, Canada
- Listed height: 5 ft 10 in (1.78 m)
- Listed weight: 231 lb (105 kg)

Career information
- University: Laval
- CFL draft: 2016: 4th round, 28th overall pick

Career history
- 2016–2025: Winnipeg Blue Bombers

Awards and highlights
- 2× Grey Cup champion (2019, 2021)

Career CFL statistics as of 2025
- Games played: 123
- Def tackles: 64
- ST tackles: 78
- Sacks: 2
- Forced fumbles: 2
- Stats at CFL.ca

Shayne Gauthier (born February 20, 1992) is a Canadian professional football linebacker. He most recently played for the Winnipeg Blue Bombers of the Canadian Football League (CFL). He is a two-time Grey Cup champion after winning with the Blue Bombers in 2019 and 2021.

== University career ==
Gauthier played CIS football for the Laval Rouge et Or from 2012 to 2015 where he won two Vanier Cup championships in 2012 and 2013.

== Professional career ==
Gauthier was drafted 28th overall in the fourth round of the 2016 CFL draft by the Blue Bombers and signed with the team on May 20, 2016. Following training camp, he made the team's active roster and played in his first professional football game on June 24, 2016, against the Montreal Alouettes where he recorded one special teams tackle. Over the course of his career, he has primarily been a special teams player for the Blue Bombers. During the 2019 West Division Final against the Saskatchewan Roughriders, with the Blue Bombers leading 20–13 in the fourth quarter, Gauthier made a shoestring tackle to save a touchdown during a trick punt return. Winnipeg closed out the game by the same score and the Blue Bombers advanced to the 107th Grey Cup. In the Grey Cup game that year, Gauthier recorded one special teams tackle as the Blue Bombers ended a 29-year championship drought in the 107th Grey Cup victory over the Hamilton Tiger-Cats.

On January 8, 2021, Gauthier signed a one-year contract extension to remain with the Blue Bombers. In a shortened 2021 season, he played in all 14 regular season games where he had 15 defensive tackles and nine special teams tackles. He also appeared in both post-season games that year, including the 108th Grey Cup game where he Blue Bombers again defeated the Tiger-Cats and Gauthier won his second championship.

In 2022, Gauthier received more playing time on defence and recorded a career-high 28 defensive tackles, five special teams tackles, and the first two sacks of his career. He made a third appearance in a Grey Cup game and recorded a special teams tackle, but the Blue Bombers lost the 109th Grey Cup to the Toronto Argonauts. Gauthier's 2023 season was marred by injury as he played in the first four regular season games, but only played in two of the last 14. He had six defensive tackles and three special teams tackles in six regular season games. He was healthy for the playoffs and had his most productive post-season as he recorded one defensive tackle and one special teams tackle in the West Final and five defensive tackles and one sack in the 110th Grey Cup loss to the Montreal Alouettes.

Gauthier played in all 18 regular season games in 2024 and made his first career start on June 6, 2024, against the Alouettes, and made three total starts during the season. He recorded seven defensive tackles, a career-high 14 special teams tackles, and one forced fumble. He had three special teams tackles in the West Final and one more in the 111th Grey Cup loss to the Argonauts as Gauthier played in his fifth Grey Cup game. In the 2025 season, he played in 18 regular season games where he had eight defensive tackles, seven special teams tackles, and one kickoff return for six yards. Gauthier also had two special teams tackles in the team's East Semi-Final loss to the Alouettes.

Gauthier became a free agent when his contract expired on February 10, 2026. The Blue Bombers had stated that they did not offer him a contract, but Gauthier's agent had also confirmed that Gauthier intended to play in 2026.
