= Nick Hallett (Canadian football) =

Canadian gridiron football player (born 1994)

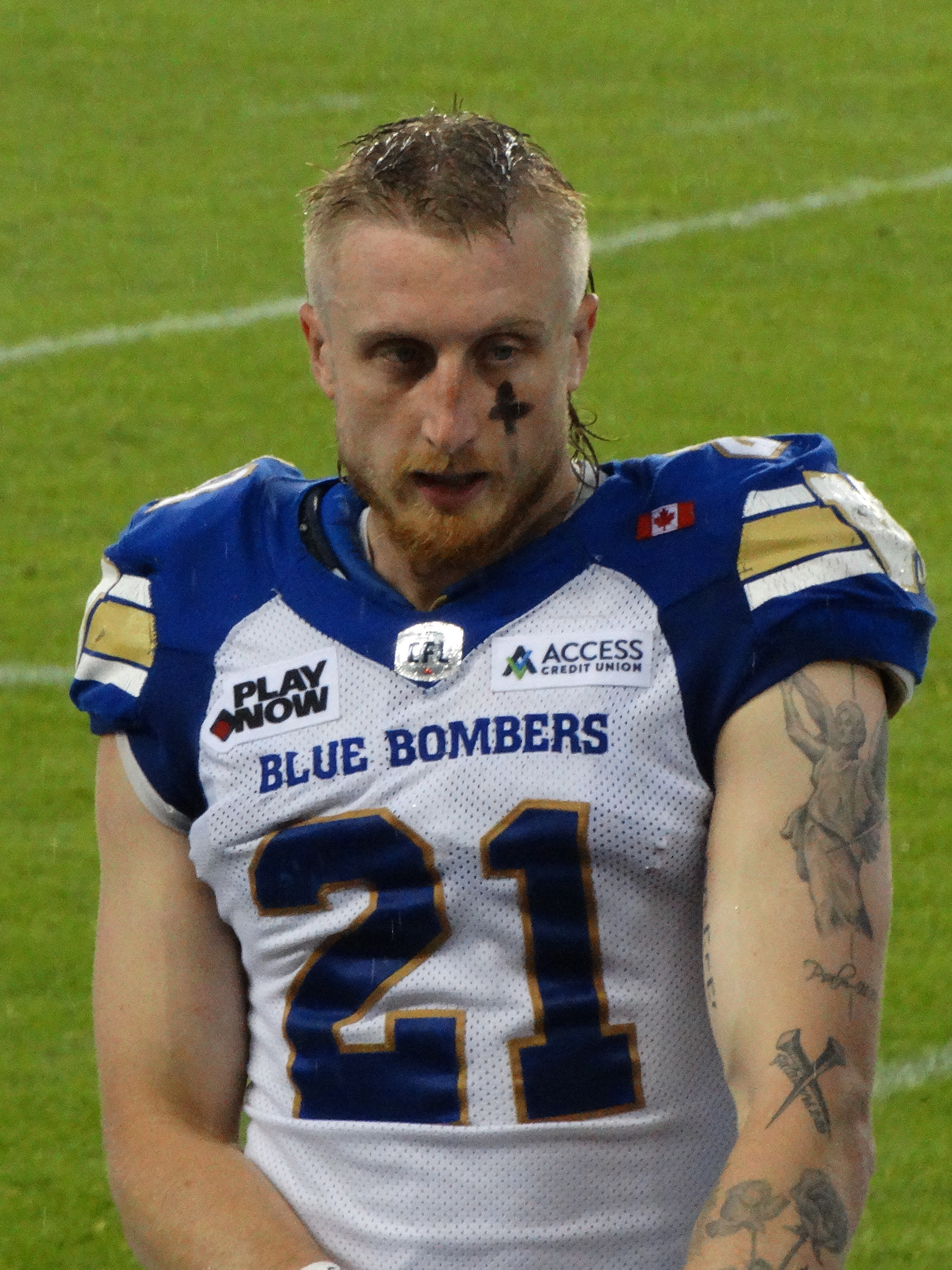
- Hallett with the Winnipeg Blue Bombers in 2025

No. 21 – Winnipeg Blue Bombers
- Position: Defensive back
- Roster status: Active
- CFL status: National

Personal information
- Born: February 12, 1994 (age 32); London, Ontario, Canada
- Listed height: 5 ft 11 in (1.80 m)
- Listed weight: 195 lb (88 kg)

Career information
- University: Toronto
- CFL draft: 2019: 7th round, 61st overall pick

Career history
- 2019–present: Winnipeg Blue Bombers

Awards and highlights
- 2× Grey Cup champion (2019, 2021)

Career CFL statistics as of 2026
- Total tackles: 137
- Sacks: 1
- Forced fumbles: 4
- Fumble recoveries: 2
- Pass knockdowns: 3
- Interceptions: 1
- Defensive touchdowns: 1
- Stats at CFL.ca

Nick Hallett (born February 12, 1994) is a Canadian professional football defensive back for the Winnipeg Blue Bombers of the Canadian Football League (CFL). He is a two-time Grey Cup champion after winning with the Blue Bombers in 2019 and 2021.

== University career ==
Hallett played U Sports football for the Toronto Varsity Blues. He played in 28 games over six seasons with his best season coming in 2017 where he had 60 tackles, one sack, two fumble recoveries, and one interception.

== Professional career ==
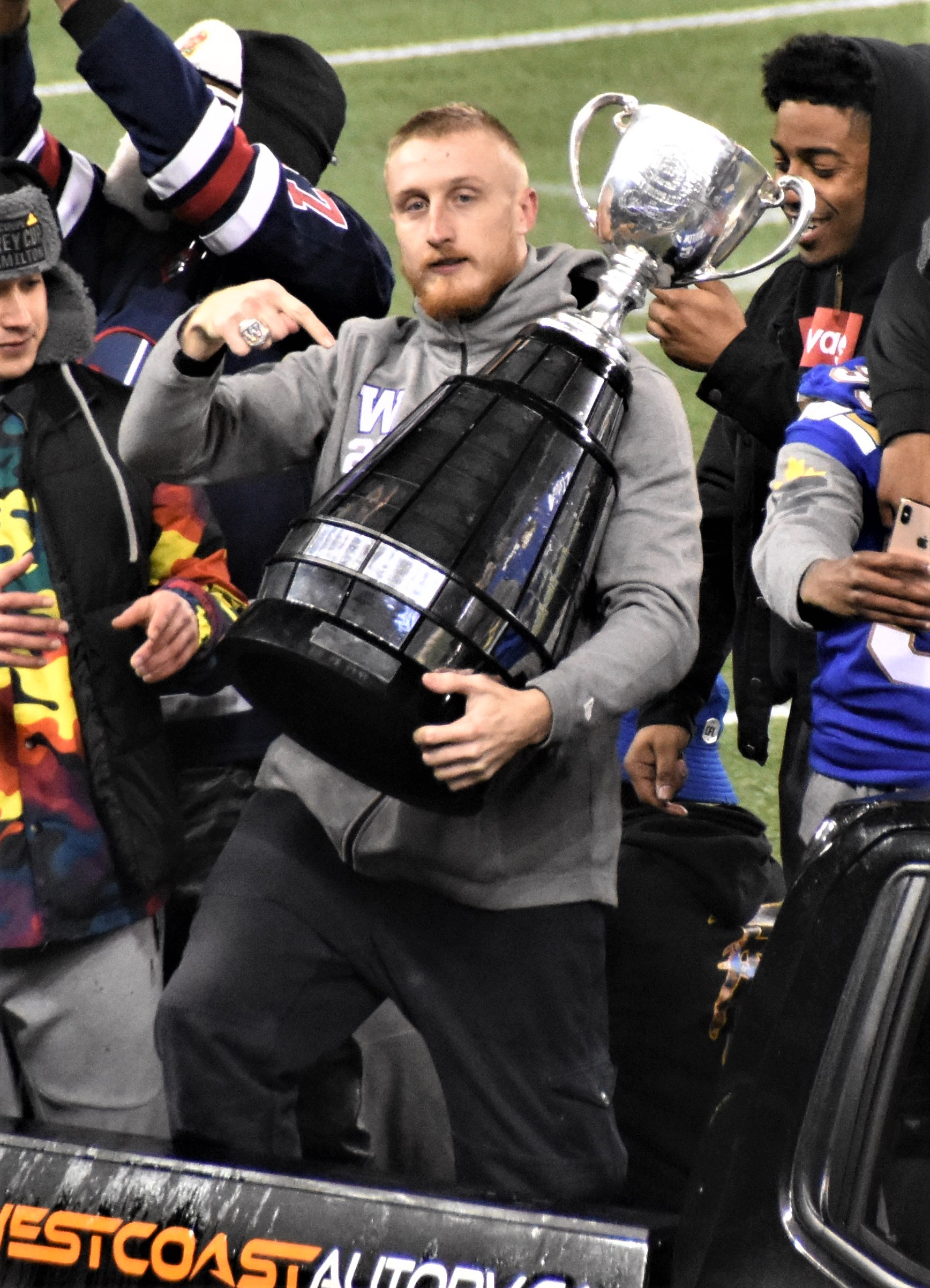
Hallett at Winnipeg's 2021 Grey Cup celebration.

Hallett was drafted in the seventh round, 61st overall, in the 2019 CFL draft by the Winnipeg Blue Bombers and was signed on May 15, 2019. He made the team's active roster following training camp and played in his first professional game on June 15, 2019, against the BC Lions. He played in all 18 regular season games in 2019 where he recorded 13 special teams tackles and one forced fumble. Hallett also played in the 107th Grey Cup where the Blue Bombers defeated the Hamilton Tiger-Cats 33–12.

Hallett did not play in 2020 due to the cancellation of the 2020 CFL season. In 2021, he played in all 14 regular season games where he recorded seven defensive tackles, 16 special teams tackles, one forced fumble, and one fumble return. He played again in the Grey Cup where he had one special teams tackle as the Blue Bombers won back-to-back championships following their 33–25 overtime victory over the Tiger-Cats in the 108th Grey Cup.

In the 2022 season, Hallett played in all 18 regular season games and had the first six starts of his career that year. He recorded a career-high 24 defensive tackles, 11 special teams tackles, his first career interception, and one forced fumble. In the 109th Grey Cup, Hallett had two special teams tackles and blocked a field goal in the fourth quarter, but the Blue Bombers lost to the Toronto Argonauts 24–23 when they had their own field goal attempt blocked. He played in 18 regular season games in 2023, starting in one, where he had three defensive tackles and a career-high 20 special teams tackles. In the West Final, Hallett had one defensive tackle and his first career touchdown on a 15-yard fumble recovery in the victory over the BC Lions. He then had two special teams tackles in the 110th Grey Cup loss to the Montreal Alouettes.

Hallett played in 18 regular season games in 2024 where he recorded six defensive tackles, 11 special teams tackles, and one quarterback sack. He also recorded his first career regular season touchdown on a fumble recovery in the end zone in the Labour Day Classic against the Saskatchewan Roughriders. In the 111th Grey Cup, he had one special teams tackle as the Blue Bombers lost again to the Argonauts.

== Personal life ==
Hallett's brother, Noah Hallett, also played for the Blue Bombers.
