= Rasheed Bailey =

American gridiron football player (born 1993)

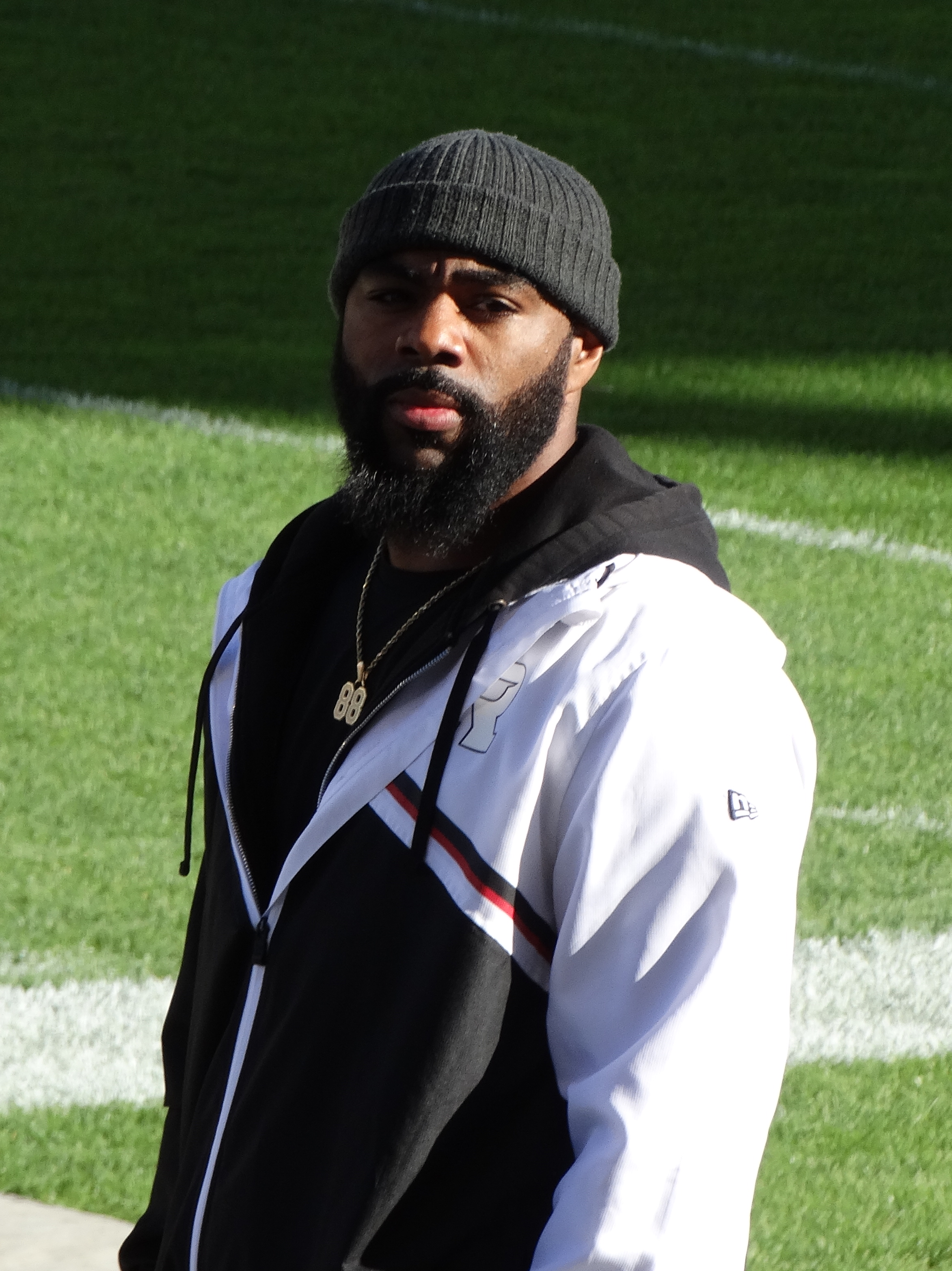
- Bailey with the Ottawa Redblacks in 2024

Profile
- Position: Wide receiver

Personal information
- Born: July 29, 1993 (age 33); Philadelphia, Pennsylvania
- Listed height: 6 ft 2 in (1.88 m)
- Listed weight: 212 lb (96 kg)

Career information
- High school: Roxborough (Philadelphia, Pennsylvania)
- College: Delaware Valley (2011–2014)
- NFL draft: 2015: undrafted

Career history
- Philadelphia Eagles (2015)*; BC Lions (2015)*; Jacksonville Jaguars (2015–2016)*; San Diego Chargers (2016)*; Philadelphia Eagles (2017)*; Cleveland Browns (2017)*; Carolina Panthers (2017–2018)*; Winnipeg Blue Bombers (2019–2023); Toronto Argonauts (2024); Ottawa Redblacks (2024)*
- * Offseason or practice squad member only

Awards and highlights
- 2× Grey Cup champion (2019, 2021); Maxwell Award Tri-State Player Of The Year (2014)
- Stats at Pro Football Reference
- Stats at CFL.ca

Rasheed Bailey (born July 29, 1993) is an American professional football wide receiver. He played college football at Delaware Valley. He has been a member of the Philadelphia Eagles, Jacksonville Jaguars, San Diego Chargers, and Cleveland Browns of the National Football League (NFL) and the BC Lions, Winnipeg Blue Bombers, Toronto Argonauts, and Ottawa Redblacks of the Canadian Football League (CFL).

== College career ==
Bailey finished his four-year career at Delaware Valley University as the school's all-time leader in receiving yards (3,138) and ranked second and third in receiving touchdowns (29) and receptions (165), respectively. As a senior in 2014, capped his career by setting single-season school records in all major receiving categories with 80 catches for 1,707 yards and 19 touchdowns. Led all of Division III in receiving yardage, yards per game (155.2) and receiving TDs. Bailey was also college teammates with current Spokane Empire quarterback Aaron Wilmer

== Professional career ==
=== Philadelphia Eagles ===
After going undrafted during the 2015 NFL draft, Bailey signed as an undrafted free agent with the Philadelphia Eagles. Bailey was cut by the Eagles on September 4, 2015

=== BC Lions ===
On October 6, 2015, Bailey was signed to the BC Lions practice roster, but was subsequently removed and signed with the Jacksonville Jaguars.

=== Jacksonville Jaguars ===
On October 20, 2015, Bailey signed to the Jacksonville Jaguars practice squad. He was released on August 17, 2016.

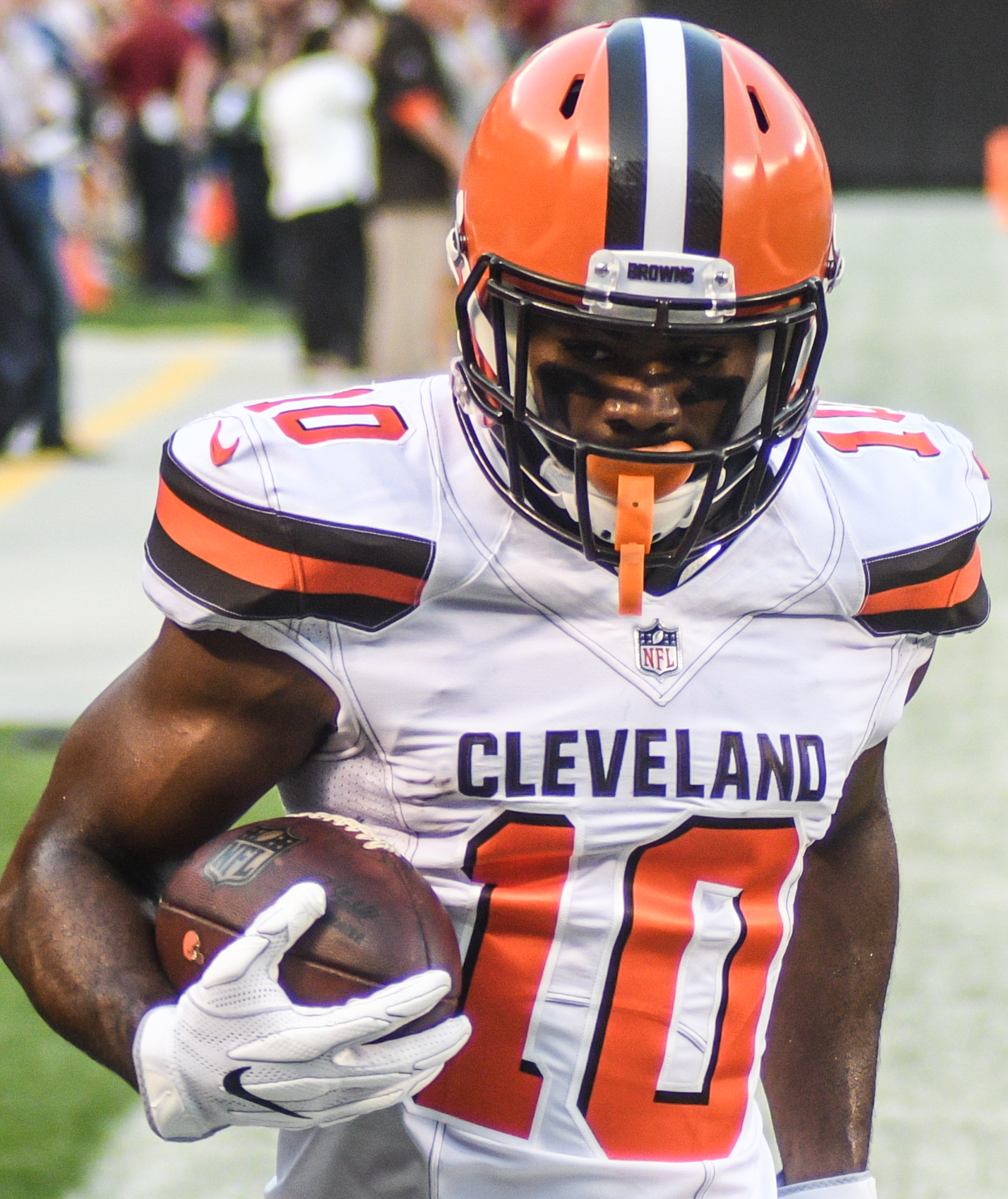
Bailey with the Cleveland Browns in 2017.

=== San Diego Chargers ===
On August 18, 2016, Bailey was claimed off waivers after being released by the Jaguars. On September 3, 2016, he was waived/injured by the Chargers. On September 9, he was released from injured reserve.

=== Philadelphia Eagles ===
On January 4, 2017, Bailey signed a reserve/future contract with the Eagles. He was waived by the Eagles on May 10, 2017.

=== Cleveland Browns ===
On August 5, 2017, Bailey signed with the Cleveland Browns. He was waived on September 1, 2017, during roster cutdowns.

=== Carolina Panthers ===
On December 12, 2017, Bailey was signed to the Carolina Panthers' practice squad. He signed a reserve/future contract with the Panthers on January 8, 2018. On August 31, 2018, Bailey was released as part of final roster cuts.

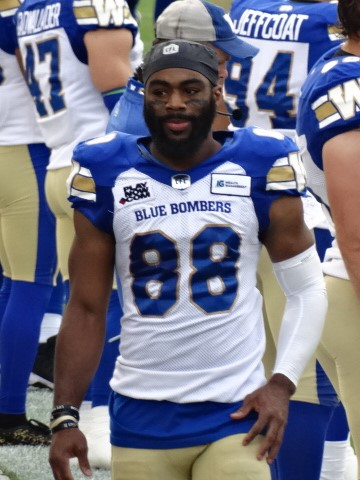
Bailey with the Winnipeg Blue Bombers in 2022.

=== Winnipeg Blue Bombers ===
Bailey joined the Winnipeg Blue Bombers in 2019, his first season in the Canadian Football League. He finished the year with 19 receptions for 206 yards. Bailey also helped the team as they fought their way into the 2019 Grey Cup, winning both playoff games on the road. He had two receptions for 15 yards as the club won their first Grey Cup in 30 years. Bailey signed a one-year contract extension with the Winnipeg Blue Bombers on January 14, 2021. During the 2021 season he had an increasing role in the Bombers' offence, helping the team lead the CFL on the offensive side of the ball. He had 52 catches for 629 yards both placed in the CFL's top 14, and had 5 touchdown passes as well. Bailey also picked up 58 yards on seven rushes.

Bailey was asked about joining the Blue Bombers by media from his hometown Philadelphia in 2021 and he replied of playing for the team that "You think about Winnipeg and you say, ‘Where is Winnipeg?’ or some people might ask ‘What is the CFL?’ But the moment I got here, I knew this is a football town. The crowd, the bells that ring, the horn, the cannon that goes off when we score touchdowns ... everything about it is just special." Bailey continued to play a key role on the Bombers in his sophomore season, helping the team to their second consecutive Grey Cup. There the Blue Bombers played against the hometown Hamilton Tiger-Cats again in a rematch. Bailey had a critical catch for 34 yards and caught the two-point conversion after the touchdown in overtime as the Blue Bombers won the 108th Grey Cup by a score of 33-25. He finished the game with three catches for 60 yards.

After testing free agency, it was announced on February 17, 2023, that Bailey had signed a one-year contract with the Blue Bombers. He played in 18 regular season games in 2023 where he had 46 receptions for 508 yards and six touchdowns. Bailey became a free agent upon the expiry of his contract on February 13, 2024.

=== Toronto Argonauts ===
On February 26, 2024, it was announced that Bailey had signed with the Toronto Argonauts. He played in six games and recorded 24 receptions for 245 yards and two touchdowns, before being released on July 26, 2024, just prior to the team's game against the Blue Bombers.

=== Ottawa Redblacks ===
On August 29, 2024, it was announced that Bailey had signed a practice roster agreement with the Ottawa Redblacks. However, he did not dress in a regular season game in 2024 and his contract expired on November 3, 2024, following the Redblacks' loss in the East Semi-Final.

== Statistics ==
Receiving		Regular season						Playoffs
Year	Team	Games	Rec	Yards	Avg	Long	TD	Games	Rec	Yards	Avg	Long	TD
2019	WPG	5	19	206	10.8	36	0	3	4	26	6.5	11	0
2020	WPG	Season cancelled						Season cancelled
2021	WPG	14	52	629	12.1	50	5	2	6	116	19.3	34	1
2022	WPG	18	63	729	11.6	36	9	2	4	50	12.5	17	0
2023	WPG	18	46	508	11.0	68	6	2	2	18	9.0	10	0
2024	TOR	6	24	245	10.2	25	2	Released
CFL totals		61	204	2,317	11.4	68	22	9	16	210	13.1	34	1
