= Asotui Eli =

Canadian gridiron football player (born 1996)

- Eli with the Winnipeg Blue Bombers in 2026

No. 65 – Winnipeg Blue Bombers
- Position: Offensive lineman
- Roster status: Active
- CFL status: National

Personal information
- Born: January 31, 1996 (age 30); Richmond, British Columbia, Canada
- Listed height: 6 ft 4 in (1.93 m)
- Listed weight: 314 lb (142 kg)

Career information
- College: Hawaii
- CFL draft: 2019: 4th round, 34th overall pick

Career history
- 2019–2021, 2023–present: Winnipeg Blue Bombers

Awards and highlights
- Grey Cup champion (2019, 2021)
- Stats at CFL.ca

Tavita Asotui Peter Eli (born January 31, 1996) is a Canadian professional football offensive lineman for the Winnipeg Blue Bombers of the Canadian Football League (CFL).

== College career ==
After using a redshirt season in 2014, Eli played college football for the Hawaii Rainbow Warriors from 2015 to 2017. An injury in 2018 cost him the entire season and he walked away from football.

== Professional career ==
Prior to the 2019 CFL draft, Eli was contacted by the Winnipeg Blue Bombers to see if he was interested in playing football again, to which he responded yes. Ultimately, he was drafted in the fourth round, 34th overall by the Bombers. Eli helped anchor the Bombers' offensive line during their 2019 season where he played in five regular season games. In that same season, he also played in the 107th Grey Cup where the Blue Bombers won over the Hamilton Tiger-Cats 33–12, which was the team's first Grey Cup in 28 years.

In a shortened 2021 season, Eli played in all 14 regular season games and the West Final. However, he was suspended prior to the 108th Grey Cup due to his vaccination status from COVID-19. He became a free agent upon the expiry of his contract on February 8, 2022, and sat out the 2022 CFL season.

On January 28, 2023, Eli signed a three-year contract to return to play for the Blue Bombers.

== Personal life ==
Eli was born in Richmond, British Columbia to parents Vaeluaga and Julianne Eli; he is of Samoan heritage.
