= Liam Dobson =

Canadian gridiron football player (born 1994)

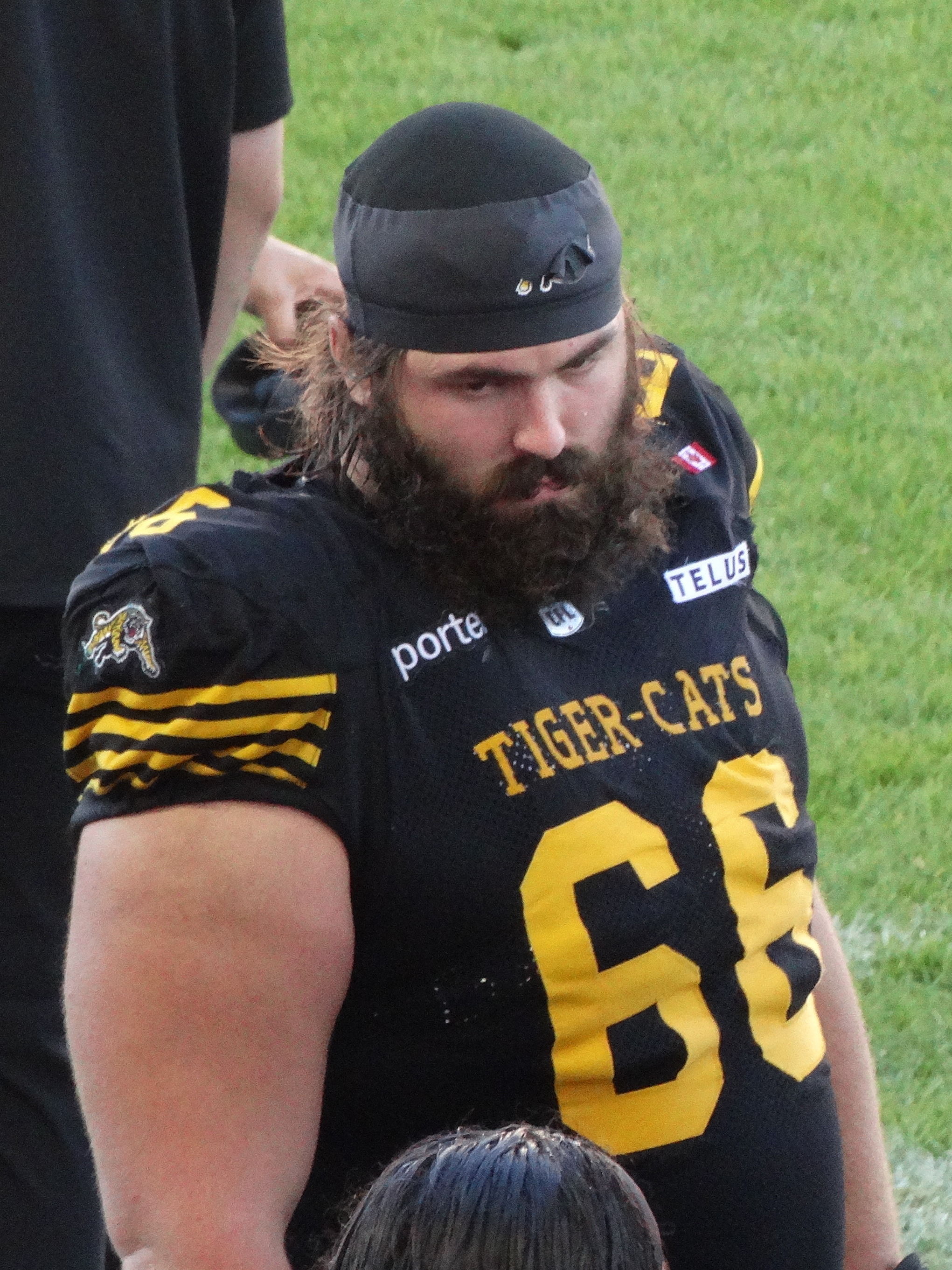
- Dobson with the Hamilton Tiger-Cats in 2025

No. 66 – Hamilton Tiger-Cats
- Position: Offensive lineman
- Roster status: Active
- CFL status: National

Personal information
- Born: February 6, 1998 (age 28); Ottawa, Ontario, Canada
- Listed height: 6 ft 2 in (1.88 m)
- Listed weight: 340 lb (154 kg)

Career information
- High school: Canada Prep Academy; St. Mark Catholic High
- College: Maine (2017–2020); Texas State (2021)
- CFL draft: 2021: 1st round, 3rd overall pick

Career history
- Winnipeg Blue Bombers (2022–2024); Hamilton Tiger-Cats (2025–present)

Awards and highlights
- CFL West All-Star (2024)
- Stats at CFL.ca

Liam Dobson (born February 6, 1998) is a Canadian professional football offensive lineman for the Hamilton Tiger-Cats of the Canadian Football League (CFL). He played college football for the Maine Black Bears and Texas State Bobcats.

== College career ==
=== Maine ===
A highly-touted prospect out of Canada, Dobson was recruited by number of FBS and FCS schools, including Syracuse, Buffalo, Maine, Colgate, and Fordham. Dobson committed to Maine. In his 2017 freshman season, he participated in six games on an offensive line which allowed the fewest sacks in the CAA. In 2018 Dobson stepped into the starting lineup at right guard, helping guide Maine to the CAA Championship and into the final four of the FCS Playoffs. After the season Dobson received All-CAA second team honors and was named an honorable mention on HERO Sports' Sophomore All-American team. The following season, Dobson was named to the 2019 Preseason All-CAA team. He started all 12 games, splitting time between guard and tackle, and averaged twelve knockdowns per game en route to STATS FCS All-American, All-CAA, and Phil Steele FCS All-Conference honors. Additionally, Dobson was the recipient of Maine's annual honor for offensive linemen: the Sam Sezak Outstanding Offensive Lineman award. Dobson again received Preseason All-American and All-Conference accolades in 2020. However, after the postponement of the CAA football season due to the COVID-19 pandemic, Dobson entered the transfer portal.

=== Texas State ===
Dobson received numerous scholarship offers from FBS schools once in the transfer portal, ultimately committing to Texas State. After his one season in San Marcos, he was named a PFF All-Sun Belt Honorable Mention while also making the Dean List.

== Professional career ==
Pre-draft measurables
Height	Weight	Arm length	Hand span	Wingspan
6 ft 2 1/8 in (1.88 m)	312 lb (142 kg)	32 3/4 in (0.83 m)	9 3/4 in (0.25 m)	6 ft 6 7/8 in (2.00 m)
All values from Pro Day

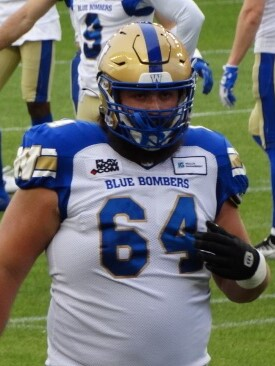
Dobson with the Blue Bombers in 2024

=== Winnipeg Blue Bombers ===
After failing to get picked up by an NFL team after mini-camps with the New Orleans Saints and Chicago Bears, Dobson expressed interest in joining the United States Football League but found that the league was not allowed to issue the necessary P visa due to a lack of revenue.

Dobson was drafted in the first round, third overall, by the Winnipeg Blue Bombers in the 2022 CFL draft and signed with the team on May 20, 2022. He made his professional debut on June 24, 2022, against the Hamilton Tiger-Cats as a backup offensive lineman. He dressed in 16 regular season games in 2022 and started in one. He also played in both post-season games, including the 109th Grey Cup where the Blue Bombers lost to the Toronto Argonauts.

In the 2023 season, Dobson dressed in all 18 regular season games, starting in one, and also dressed in both post-season games. In 2024, he earned a starting job as he started in all 18 regular season games and was named a CFL Western Division All-Star. He also started in both post-season games, but lost his third Grey Cup game in a row. He became a free agent upon the expiry of his contract on February 11, 2025.

=== Hamilton Tiger-Cats ===
On February 11, 2025, Dobson signed a two-year contract with the Hamilton Tiger-Cats.
