= Brendan O'Leary-Orange =

Canadian gridiron football player (born 1996)

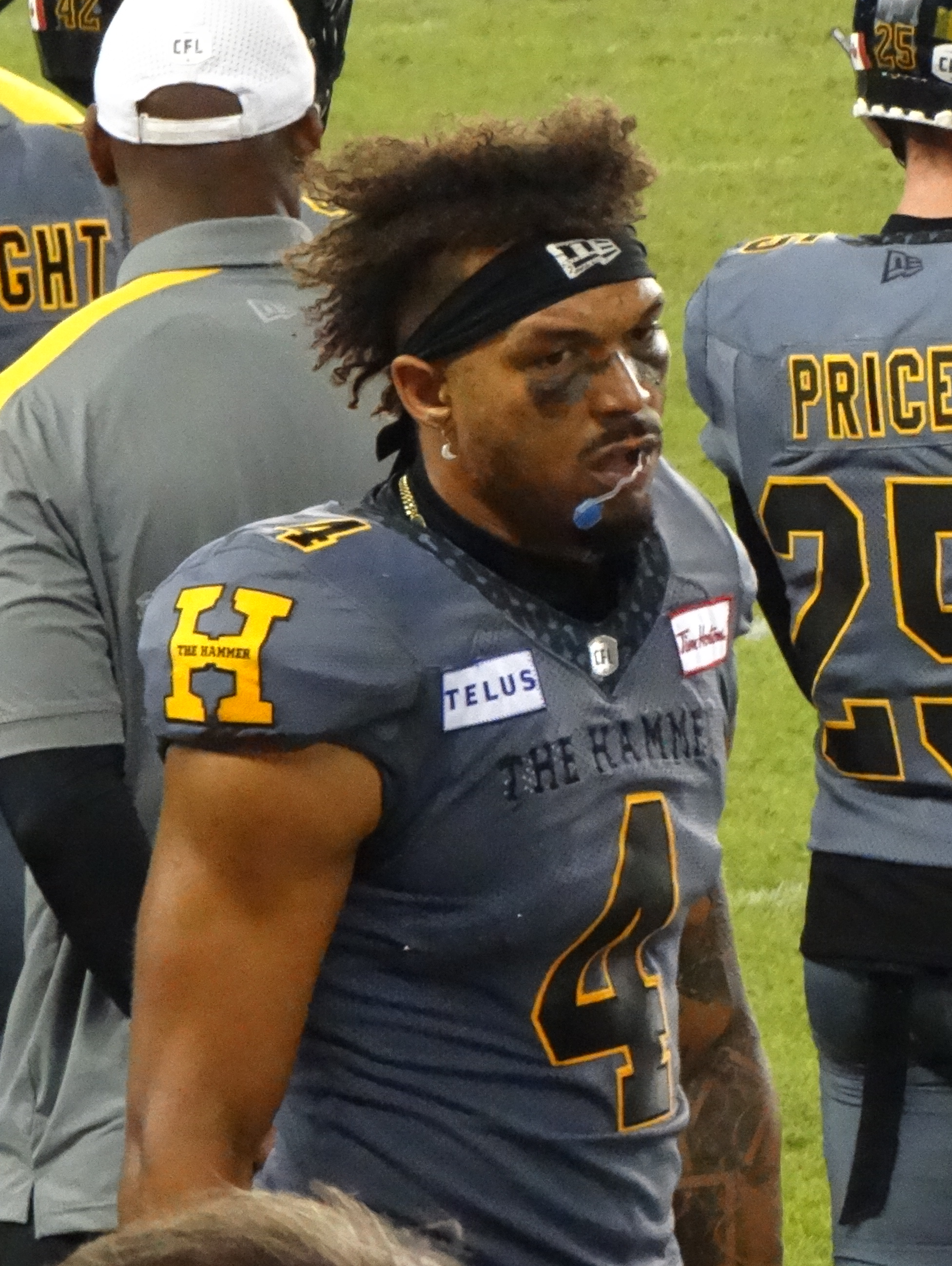
- O'Leary-Orange with the Edmonton Elks in 2026

No. 6 – Edmonton Elks
- Position: Wide receiver
- Roster status: Active
- CFL status: National

Personal information
- Born: June 24, 1996 (age 30); Toronto, Ontario, Canada
- Listed height: 6 ft 4 in (1.93 m)
- Listed weight: 205 lb (93 kg)

Career information
- College: Nevada
- CFL draft: 2020: 4th round, 37th overall pick

Career history
- 2021–2023: Winnipeg Blue Bombers
- 2024–2025: Hamilton Tiger-Cats
- 2026-Present: Edmonton Elks

Awards and highlights
- 2× Grey Cup champion (2021, 2026)
- Stats at CFL.ca

Brendan Peter O'Leary-Orange (born June 24, 1996) is a Canadian professional football wide receiver for the Edmonton Elks of the Canadian Football League (CFL).

== College career ==
O'Leary-Orange played college football for the Nevada Wolf Pack from 2016 to 2019 after taking a redshirt season in 2015.

== Professional career ==
Pre-draft measurables
| Height | Weight |
|---|---|
| 6 ft 4 in (1.93 m) | 210 lb (95 kg) |
Values from Pro Day

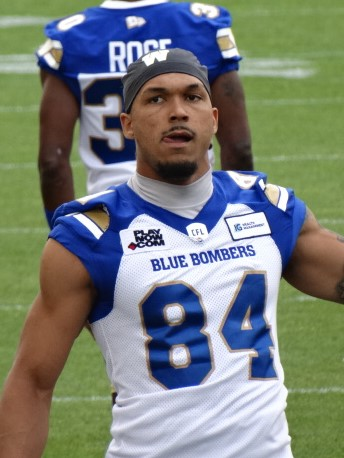
O'Leary-Orange with the Winnipeg Blue Bombers in 2022

=== Winnipeg Blue Bombers ===
O'Leary-Orange was drafted in the fourth round, 37th overall, by the Winnipeg Blue Bombers in the 2020 CFL draft, but did not play in 2020 due to the cancellation of the 2020 CFL season. He then signed with the team on April 26, 2021. He began the 2021 season on the practice roster, but was elevated to the active roster in week 14 where he played in his first professional game on November 6, 2021, against the Montreal Alouettes. He dressed in the last three regular season games as a backup receiver where he recorded two special teams tackles. He also played in both post-season games that year and won his first Grey Cup championship after the Blue Bombers defeated the Hamilton Tiger-Cats in the 108th Grey Cup championship game.

On September 10, 2022, in the Banjo Bowl game against the Saskatchewan Roughriders, O'Leary-Orange scored his first career touchdown on a 10-yard pass from Zach Collaros.

O'Leary-Orange became a free agent upon the expiry of his contract on February 13, 2024.

=== Hamilton Tiger-Cats ===
On February 14, 2024, it was announced that O'Leary-Orange had signed with the Hamilton Tiger-Cats.

=== Edmonton Elks ===
The Edmonton Elks announced the signing of O'Leary-Orange through free agency on February 11, 2026.

== Personal life ==
O'Leary-Orange was born in Toronto, Ontario to parents Margaret O'Leary-Orange and Doyle Orange. He has two brothers, Daniel and Liam. His father also played professionally as a running back and played for the Toronto Argonauts and Hamilton Tiger-Cats.

Brendan attended Michael Power - St. Joseph High School where he played high school football
