= Steven Richardson (Canadian football) =

American gridiron football player (born 1996)

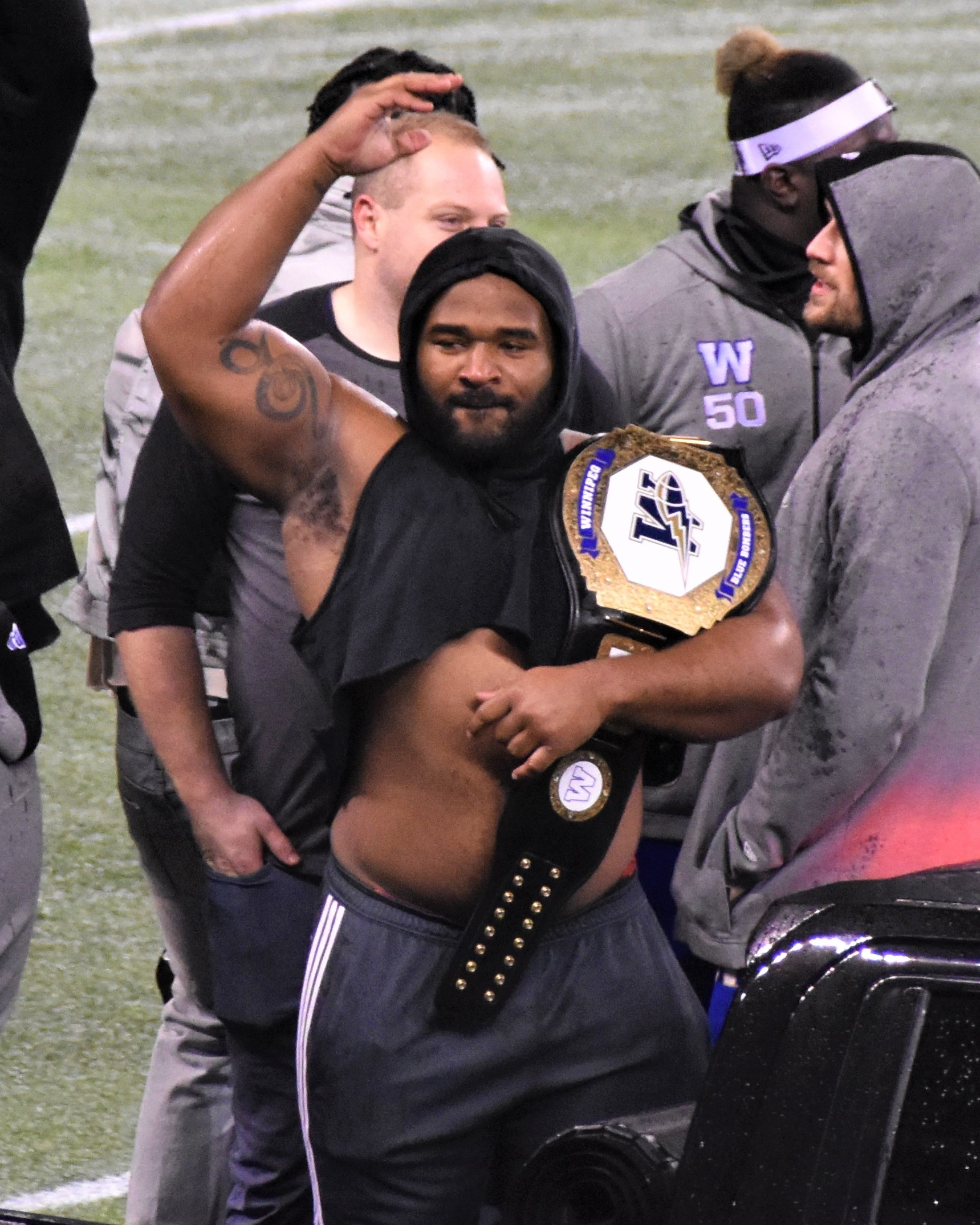
- Richardson at Winnipeg's 2021 Grey Cup celebration

Profile
- Position: Defensive tackle

Personal information
- Born: February 28, 1996 (age 30); Chicago, Illinois, U.S.
- Listed height: 5 ft 11 in (1.80 m)
- Listed weight: 298 lb (135 kg)

Career information
- High school: Mount Carmel
- College: Minnesota
- NFL draft: 2018: undrafted

Career history
- Los Angeles Chargers (2018)*; Winnipeg Blue Bombers (2019–2021); BC Lions (2022); BC Lions (2024)*
- * Offseason or practice squad member only

Awards and highlights
- 2× Grey Cup champion (2019, 2021)
- Stats at CFL.ca

Steven Richardson (born February 28, 1996) is an American former professional football defensive tackle. He played college football at Minnesota, and signed with the Los Angeles Chargers of the National Football League (NFL) as an undrafted free agent in 2018. He was also a member of the Winnipeg Blue Bombers and BC Lions of the Canadian Football League (CFL).

== College career ==
Richardson played in 48 games for the University of Minnesota from 2014–17 and recorded 103 defensive tackles, 12.5 sacks, a pair of forced fumbles and a fumble recovery. Led all Golden Gopher defenders with 11 tackles for a loss and seven sacks in 2016 while earning an All-Big Ten Honourable Mention.

== Professional career ==
=== Los Angeles Chargers ===
Richardson spent time on the practice roster of the Los Angeles Chargers in 2018.

=== Winnipeg Blue Bombers ===
Richardson signed with the Winnipeg Blue Bombers of the Canadian Football League (CFL), reuniting with University of Minnesota teammates Chris Streveler and Drew Wolitarsky. Richardson won the 107th Grey Cup in his rookie year, in a game which saw the Bombers defensive line apply constant pressure to Dane Evans and the Hamilton Tiger-Cats as Winnipeg soared to a 33-12 victory. At 5 feet 11 inches (1.80 m) and weighing 298 pounds (135 kg), Richardson was noted for his low centre of gravity, ability to stop the run, and played a key part getting stops in short yardage situations for the Blue Bombers. Following the cancelled 2020 season Richardson signed a one-year contract extension with the Winnipeg Blue Bombers on February 5, 2021. Richardson won the Grey Cup again in 2021.

=== BC Lions ===
Following the 2021 season, Richardson became a free agent in February 2022 and signed a contract with the BC Lions on February 8, 2022. On April 20, 2022 the BC Lions announced that Richardson suffered a significant injury which would cause him to miss a large amount of time. The injury was later revealed to be an Achilles injury and there was hope he would be able to return for the end of the 2022 season. However, on October 13, 2022, it was announced that Richardson suffered a setback in his recovery and would not play for the Lions in 2022. In late March 2023, the Lions' co-general manager Neil McEvoy revealed that he did not expect Richardson to play for the Lions in the 2023 season. At that time, there was speculation that his playing career could be over. On May 13, 2023, he was released by the Lions.

After spending a year out of football, Richardson re-signed with the Lions on November 22, 2023. On May 2, 2024, he was moved to the retired list by the Lions, signaling the end of his professional football career.

== Statistics ==
=== CFL ===
		Defence
Year	Team	Games	Tackles	ST	Sacks	Int	TD	FF
2019	WPG	18	25	0	2	0	0	0
2020	WPG	Season cancelled
2021	WPG	7	13	0	4	0	0	1
CFL totals		25	38	0	6	0	0	1
