= Johnny Augustine =

Canadian gridiron football player (born 1993)

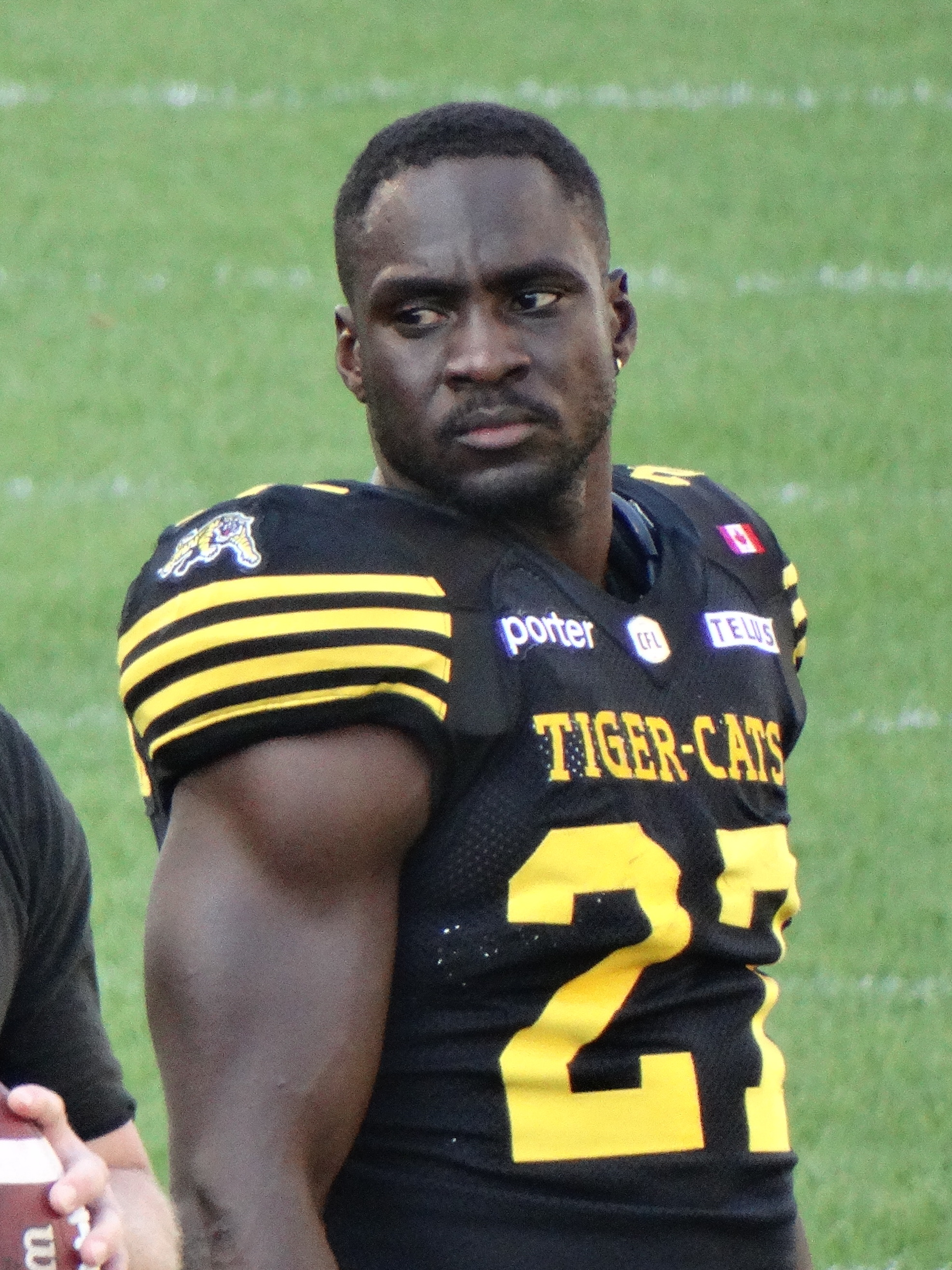
- Augustine with the Hamilton Tiger-Cats in 2025

No. 27 – Hamilton Tiger-Cats
- Position: Running back
- Roster status: Active
- CFL status: National

Personal information
- Born: July 7, 1993 (age 33); Welland, Ontario, Canada
- Listed height: 5 ft 9 in (1.75 m)
- Listed weight: 202 lb (92 kg)

Career information
- University: Guelph
- CFL draft: 2017: undrafted

Career history
- 2017: Edmonton Eskimos*
- 2018: Saskatchewan Roughriders*
- 2018–2024: Winnipeg Blue Bombers
- 2025–present: Hamilton Tiger-Cats
- * Offseason or practice squad member only

Awards and highlights
- 2× Grey Cup champion (2019, 2021)

Career CFL statistics as of 2026
- Rushing yards: 1,573
- Rushing average: 5.3
- Rushing touchdowns: 3
- Receptions: 32
- Receiving yards: 311
- Receiving touchdowns: 1
- Stats at CFL.ca

Johnny Augustine (born July 7, 1993) is a Canadian professional football running back for the Hamilton Tiger-Cats of the Canadian Football League (CFL).

== College career ==
Augustine played CIS football at the University of Guelph playing for the Guelph Gryphons.

== Professional career ==
Pre-draft measurables
Height	Weight	40-yard dash	20-yard shuttle	Three-cone drill	Vertical jump	Broad jump	Bench press
5 ft 8 5/8 in (1.74 m)	202 lb (92 kg)	4.77 s	4.40 s	7.34 s	30.5 in (0.77 m)	9 ft 2 in (2.79 m)	22 reps
All values from CFL Combine

=== Edmonton Eskimos ===
After very high expectations of being drafted early, Augustine went undrafted in the 2017 CFL draft, but was signed by the Edmonton Eskimos shortly after on May 15, 2017. He was part of the final training camp cuts and was released on June 18, 2017.

=== Saskatchewan Roughriders ===
Augustine signed with the Saskatchewan Roughriders on February 16, 2018, but was released prior to training camp on April 23, 2018.

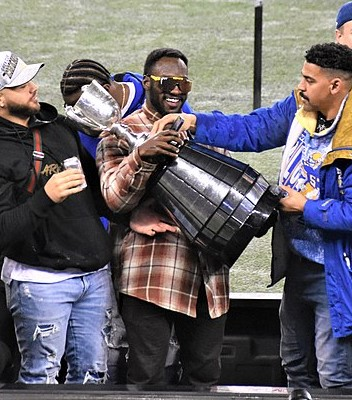
Augustine at Winnipeg's 2021 Grey Cup celebration

=== Winnipeg Blue Bombers ===
On May 16, 2018, it was announced that Augustine was signed by the Winnipeg Blue Bombers. He played in nine regular season games in 2018 where he had seven carries for 51 yards and one touchdown. In 2019, he played in 16 regular season games where he recorded 38 carries for 242 yards and six receptions for 92 yards and one receiving touchdown. Augustine also played in all three post-season games that year where he was a part of the 107th Grey Cup victory when the Blue Bombers defeated the Hamilton Tiger-Cats.

On December 27, 2019, it was announced that Augustine was signed to a two-year contract extension with the Blue Bombers. However, he did not play in 2020 due to the cancellation of the 2020 CFL season. In the 2021 season, he played in 14 regular season games and had 40 carries for 285 yards. In the 108th Grey Cup game, he recorded one special teams tackle in the team's second straight championship win over the Tiger-Cats.

In the next three seasons, Augustine continued to serve primarily as a backup running back where he played in all 18 regular season games and both post-season in each year. He played in five straight Grey Cup games, but the Blue Bombers lost their last three appearances. Augustine became a free agent upon the expiry of his contract on February 11, 2025.

=== Hamilton Tiger-Cats ===
On February 21, 2025, it was announced that Augustine had signed with the Hamilton Tiger-Cats.
