= Josh Miller (cornerback) =

American gridiron football player (born 1996)

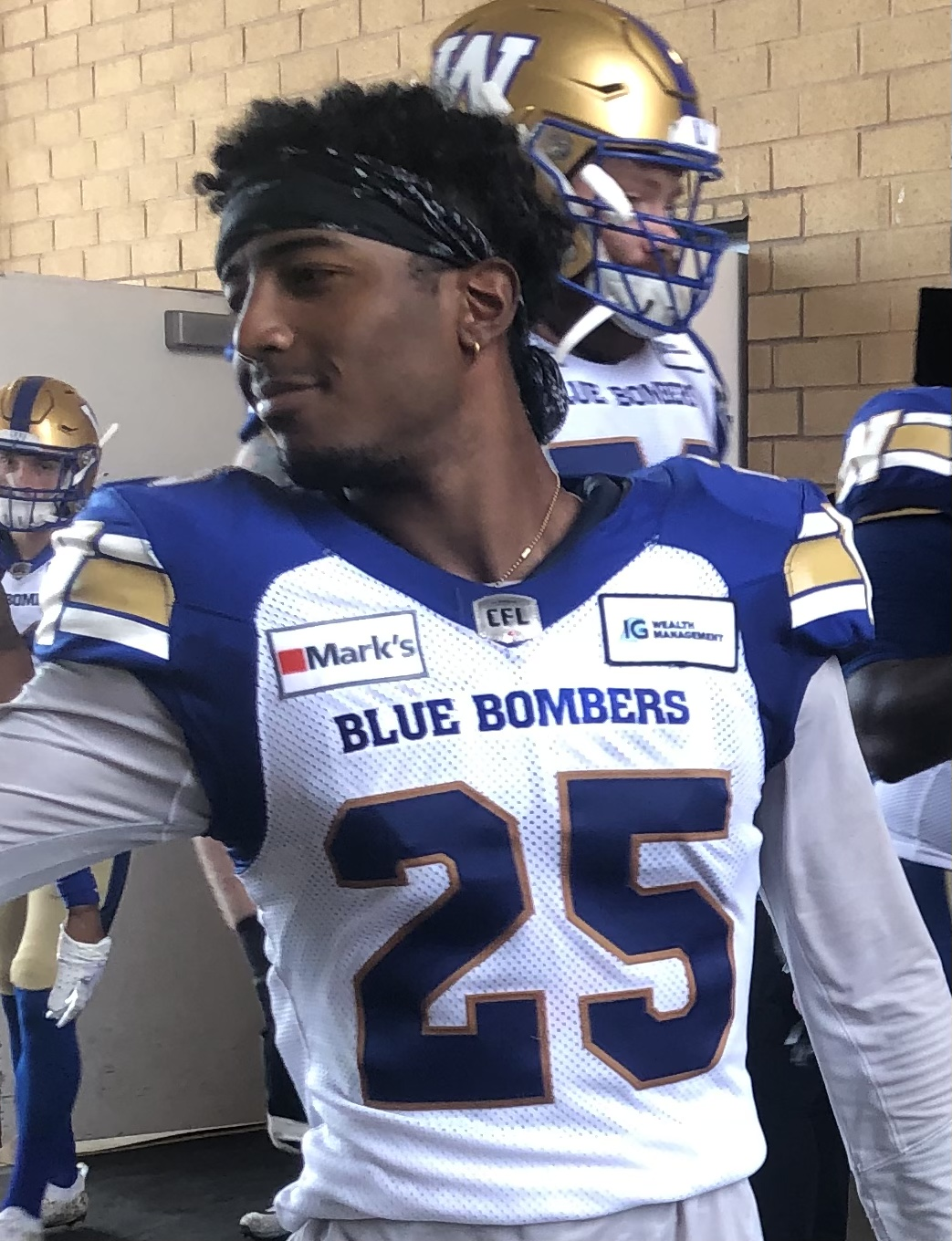
- Miller with the Winnipeg Blue Bombers in 2021

No. 25
- Position: Defensive back

Personal information
- Born: May 3, 1996 (age 30); Indianapolis, Indiana, U.S.
- Listed height: 5 ft 10 in (1.78 m)
- Listed weight: 180 lb (82 kg)

Career information
- High school: Plainfield (IN)
- College: Marian (IN) (2014); Ball State (2015–2018)
- NFL draft: 2019: undrafted

Career history
- Winnipeg Blue Bombers (2021)

Awards and highlights
- Grey Cup champion (2021)

Career CFL statistics
- Total tackles: 3
- Stats at CFL.ca

Joshua Jamal Miller (born May 3, 1996) is an American former professional football defensive back for the Winnipeg Blue Bombers of the Canadian Football League (CFL). He played college football at Ball State and Marian University (Indiana).

== Professional career ==
After going undrafted, Miller attended rookie minicamp on a tryout basis with the Detroit Lions of the National Football League (NFL) in May 2019.

Miller signed with the Winnipeg Blue Bombers on February 14, 2020. However, he did not play in 2020 due to the cancellation of the 2020 CFL season. Following training camp in 2021, he made the team's active roster and played in his first professional game on August 5, 2021, against the Hamilton Tiger-Cats. Following a loss to the Toronto Argonauts in week 3, Miller was demoted to the practice roster and did not play again in the regular season. However, he was re-activated for the 108th Grey Cup game and won his first Grey Cup championship over the Tiger-Cats.
