= Drew Richmond =

American football player (born 1996)

No. 60
- Position: Offensive tackle

Personal information
- Born: January 2, 1996 (age 30)
- Listed height: 6 ft 4 in (1.93 m)
- Listed weight: 315 lb (143 kg)

Career information
- High school: Memphis University (Memphis, Tennessee)
- College: Tennessee (2015–2018); USC (2019)
- NFL draft: 2020: undrafted

Career history
- Winnipeg Blue Bombers (2021–2023)

Awards and highlights
- Grey Cup champion (2021)
- Stats at CFL.ca

Drew A. Richmond (born January 2, 1996) is an American former professional football offensive tackle who played for the Winnipeg Blue Bombers of the Canadian Football League (CFL). He played college football at Tennessee and USC.

== Early life ==
Drew A. Richmond was born on January 2, 1996. He played high school football at Memphis University School in Memphis, Tennessee. As a senior in 2014, he earned MaxPreps second-team All-American and Parade honorable mention All-American honors. Richmond played in the 2015 Under Armour All-America Game.

== College career ==
Richmond first played college football for the Tennessee Volunteers of the University of Tennessee. He redshirted the 2015 season, and was a three-year letterman from 2016 to 2018. He played nine games, starting six at left tackle, as a redshirt freshman in 2016. Richmond appeared in seven games, all starts at left tackle, during the 2017 season. He started all 12 games at right tackle in 2018. He graduated from Tennessee with a bachelor's degree in psychology in spring 2019.

In 2019, Richmond transferred to USC to play his final year of college football eligibility. He played in 12 games, starting 11, during the 2019 season. He played in the East–West Shrine Bowl after his senior year.

== Professional career ==
Richmond was not invited to the NFL Combine, and USC's pro day ended up being cancelled due to the COVID-19 pandemic. He played in The Spring League in 2021. He played Week 1 for the Linemen but was then released and signed by the Conquerors.

Richmond signed with the Winnipeg Blue Bombers of the Canadian Football League (CFL) on July 17, 2021. He was moved to the practice roster on July 31, 2021, before the start of the 2021 CFL season. Richmond was promoted to the active roster on November 12 to start in place of Stanley Bryant who was resting as the Blue Bombers had already clinched first place in the West Division. Richmond made his CFL debut, and first start, on November 13, 2021, against the Montreal Alouettes but suffered a severe knee injury seven plays into the game. This injury caused him to miss the entire 2022 season. He was moved to the practice roster on June 4, 2023, before the start of the 2023 season. Richmond was promoted to the active roster on October 26, 2023, to start at left tackle after Stanley Bryant was moved to right tackle to replace the injured Jermarcus Hardrick. Richmond made his second career start on October 28 against the Calgary Stampeders. He was placed on injured reserve on November 10, 2023. Richmond, who was set to make the league minimum in 2024, retired on February 6, 2024, after Winnipeg would not offer him a higher contract.
