= Sean McGuire (Canadian football) =

American gridiron football player (born 1996)

No. 12
- Position: Quarterback

Personal information
- Born: February 14, 1996 (age 30); Milwaukee, Wisconsin, U.S.
- Listed height: 6 ft 2 in (1.88 m)
- Listed weight: 218 lb (99 kg)

Career information
- High school: Franklin (Franklin, Wisconsin)
- College: Western Illinois (2014–2018)
- NFL draft: 2019: undrafted

Career history
- Winnipeg Blue Bombers (2019–2022)

Awards and highlights
- 2× Grey Cup champion (2019, 2021); CFL rushing touchdowns leader (2021)

Career CFL statistics
- Passing completions: 15
- Passing attempts: 36
- Passing yards: 221
- TD–INT: 1–4
- Stats at CFL.ca

Sean McGuire (born February 14, 1996) is an American former professional football quarterback for the Winnipeg Blue Bombers of the Canadian Football League (CFL). He played college football at Western Illinois.

== College career ==
McGuire played college football for Western Illinois from 2014 to 2018.

== Professional career ==
On May 15, 2019, McGuire signed with the Winnipeg Blue Bombers. He made he team as the third-string quarterback and dressed for all 18 regular season games where played sparingly, as he completed two passes from three attempts for 17 yards. He also dressed in all three post-season games, including his first Grey Cup championship where the Blue Bombers defeated the Hamilton Tiger-Cats in the 107th Grey Cup game.

McGuire signed a one-year contract extension with the Blue Bombers on December 31, 2020. With the departure of the team's previous backup quarterback, Chris Streveler, to the National Football League, McGuire won the back-up position behind starting quarterback, Zach Collaros. McGuire was used regularly on the short yardage team and scored his first two career touchdowns on quarterback sneak plays on September 5, 2021, in the Labour Day Classic against the Saskatchewan Roughriders. With the Blue Bombers having already clinched the Western Division the Bombers announced that McGuire would be the team' starting quarterback for their Week 15 match against the Montreal Alouettes on November 13, 2021. McGuire completed 11 of 26 passes for 149 yards, a touchdown and four interceptions in his first CFL start as the Bombers were defeated 28–14 by the Alouettes.
