= Jesse Briggs =

Canadian football player (born 1990)

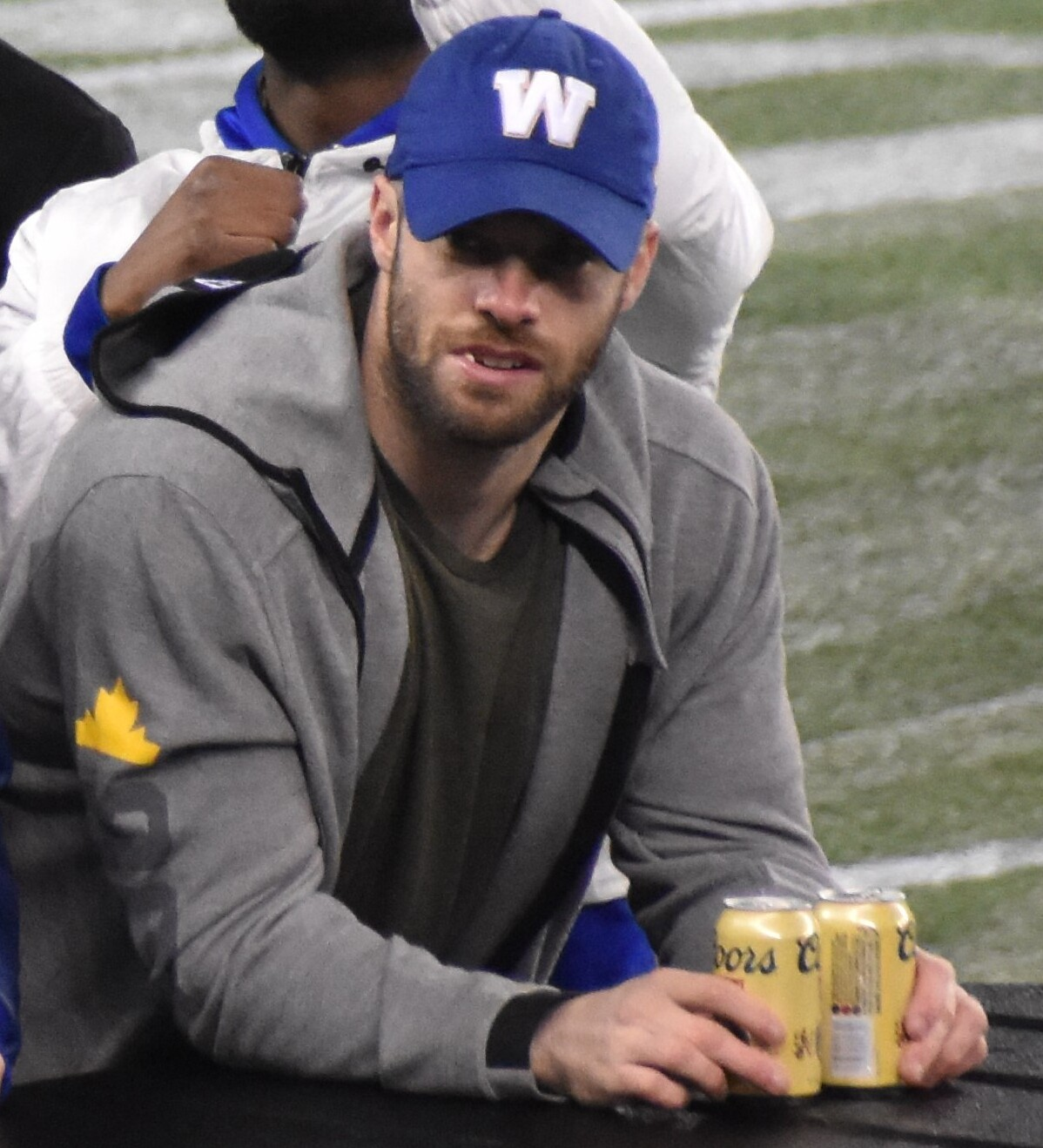
- Briggs at the Grey Cup celebration in 2021

No. 34
- Position: Linebacker

Personal information
- Born: April 14, 1990 (age 36); Kelowna, British Columbia, Canada
- Listed height: 6 ft 1 in (1.85 m)
- Listed weight: 215 lb (98 kg)

Career information
- University: McGill
- CFL draft: 2014: 2nd round, 17th overall pick

Career history
- 2014–2023: Winnipeg Blue Bombers

Awards and highlights
- 2× Grey Cup champion (2019, 2021)
- Stats at CFL.ca

Jesse Briggs (born April 14, 1990) is a Canadian former professional football linebacker who played for the Winnipeg Blue Bombers of the Canadian Football League (CFL). Briggs played CIS football for the McGill Redmen.

== Professional career ==
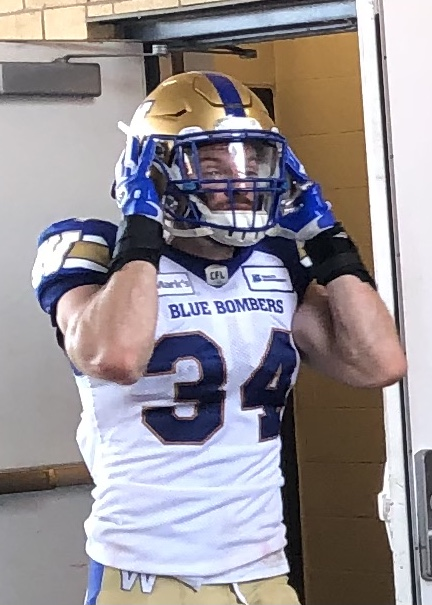
Briggs in 2021

Briggs was selected in the second round, 17th overall, in the 2014 CFL draft by the Winnipeg Blue Bombers. One of just 17 Bomber players to dress for all 18 games that year, Briggs was a regular on the club's punt and kickoff coverage teams. He saw some action on defense making a pair of defensive tackles to go with 11 stops on special team duty. He had three games with multiple special team tackles.

Additionally, in an October 10, 2015 game vs. the BC Lions, Briggs gained 11 yards on a 3rd and 10 fake punt run. After these late game heroics in a pivotal Western Division match up, he had another run in the Banjo Bowl vs. the Saskatchewan Roughriders.

He played in only four regular season games in 2019 due to injury, but returned in the playoffs where he played in all three of the Blue Bombers' post-season games. Briggs played in his first Grey Cup game that year where he recorded one defensive tackle and one special teams tackle as Briggs won his first championship in Winnipeg's victory over the Hamilton Tiger-Cats in the 107th Grey Cup game.

Briggs signed a one-year contract extension with Winnipeg on January 20, 2021. He started his first career game at linebacker on August 13, 2021 against the Toronto Argonauts where he had three defensive tackles and a forced fumble. In the next game on August 21, 2021, again against the Argonauts, he scored his first professional touchdown after returning a fumble 83 yards for a score.

He retired on February 12, 2024.
