= Tobi Antigha =

American gridiron football player (born 1993)

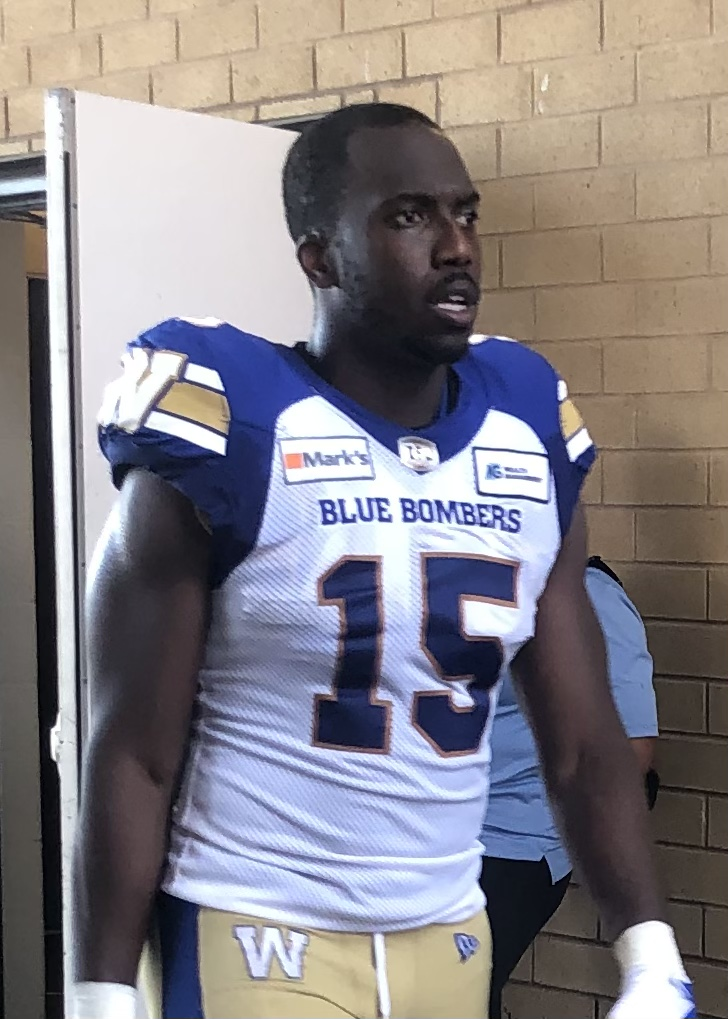
- Antigha with the Winnipeg Blue Bombers in 2021

No. 15
- Position: Linebacker

Personal information
- Born: March 16, 1993 (age 33); Tampa, Florida, U.S.
- Listed height: 6 ft 2 in (1.88 m)
- Listed weight: 240 lb (109 kg)

Career information
- High school: Steinbrenner (Lutz, Florida)
- College: Presbyterian

Career history
- Saskatchewan Roughriders (2017–2018); Toronto Argonauts (2019); Winnipeg Blue Bombers (2020–2021); Edmonton Elks (2022–2023)

Awards and highlights
- Grey Cup champion (2021)
- Stats at CFL.ca

Oluwatobi Antigha (born March 16, 1993) is an American former professional football linebacker and defensive lineman who played in the Canadian Football League (CFL). He played college football for the Presbyterian Blue Hose.

== Professional career ==
Antigha played for two seasons with the Saskatchewan Roughriders before joining the Toronto Argonauts as a free agent on February 13, 2019. After fulling his one-year contract with the Argonauts, he signed with the Blue Bombers on February 13, 2020. He signed a one-year contract extension with the Blue Bombers on January 8, 2021.

Antigha joined the Edmonton Elks in free agency on February 8, 2022. The Elks signed Antigua to a contract extension on February 16, 2023. He was released on July 24, 2023.
