= Kyrie Wilson =

American gridiron football player (born 1992)

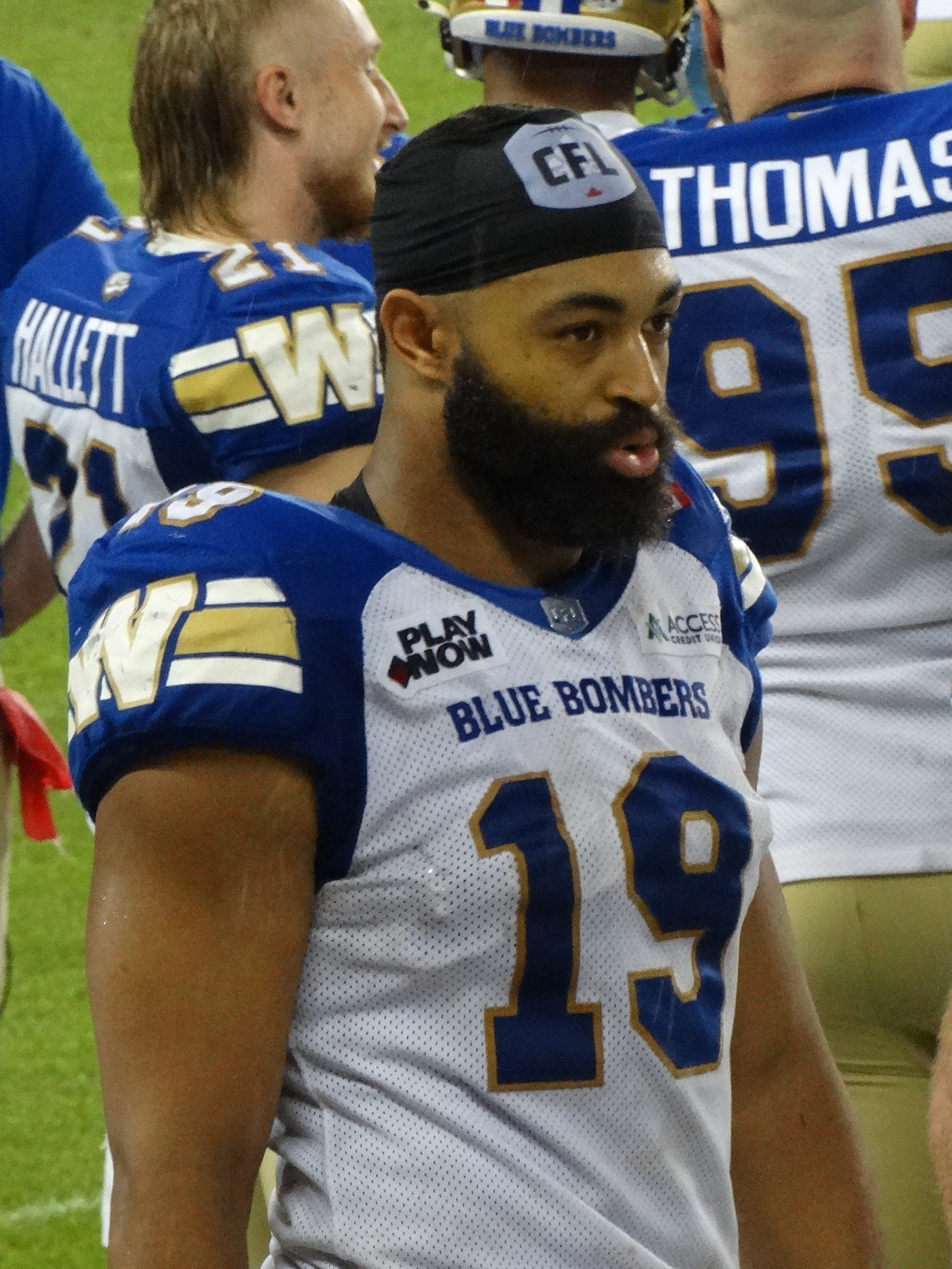
- Wilson with the Winnipeg Blue Bombers in 2025

No. 19 – Winnipeg Blue Bombers
- Position: Linebacker
- Roster status: Active
- CFL status: American

Personal information
- Born: November 5, 1992 (age 34); Fresno, California, U.S.
- Listed height: 6 ft 1 in (1.85 m)
- Listed weight: 216 lb (98 kg)

Career information
- High school: Ridgeview High School
- College: Fresno State

Career history
- 2016: Oakland Raiders*
- 2017–present: Winnipeg Blue Bombers
- * Offseason or practice squad member only

Awards and highlights
- 2× Grey Cup champion (2019, 2021)
- Stats at CFL.ca

Kyrie Jamal Wilson (born November 5, 1992) is an American professional football linebacker for the Winnipeg Blue Bombers of the Canadian Football League (CFL). He is a two-time Grey Cup champion after winning with the Blue Bombers in 2019 and 2021.

== College career ==
Wilson played college football for the Fresno State Bulldogs. He had 38 starts and recorded 251 combined tackles (144 solo), 14.5 tackles for a loss, and two interceptions.

== Professional career ==
Pre-draft measurables
Height	Weight	Arm length	Hand span	Wingspan	40-yard dash	10-yard split	20-yard split	20-yard shuttle	Three-cone drill	Vertical jump	Broad jump	Bench press
6 ft 1 5/8 in (1.87 m)	228 lb (103 kg)	31 7/8 in (0.81 m)	9 1/8 in (0.23 m)	6 ft 5 3/4 in (1.97 m)	4.60 s	1.64 s	2.66 s	4.43 s	6.99 s	40.5 in (1.03 m)	10 ft 2 in (3.10 m)	23 reps
All values from Pro Day

=== Oakland Raiders ===
Wilson signed with the Oakland Raiders of the National Football League (NFL) after going undrafted in the 2016 NFL draft. However, he was released as part of the team's final roster cuts before the start of the 2016 season.

=== Winnipeg Blue Bombers ===
Wilson first signed with the Winnipeg Blue Bombers on April 19, 2017. He made his professional debut in the Banjo Bowl that year on September 9, 2017, which was the only regular season game that he played in that year. He played in five games in 2018 and signed a two-year extension to remain with the team early in 2019.

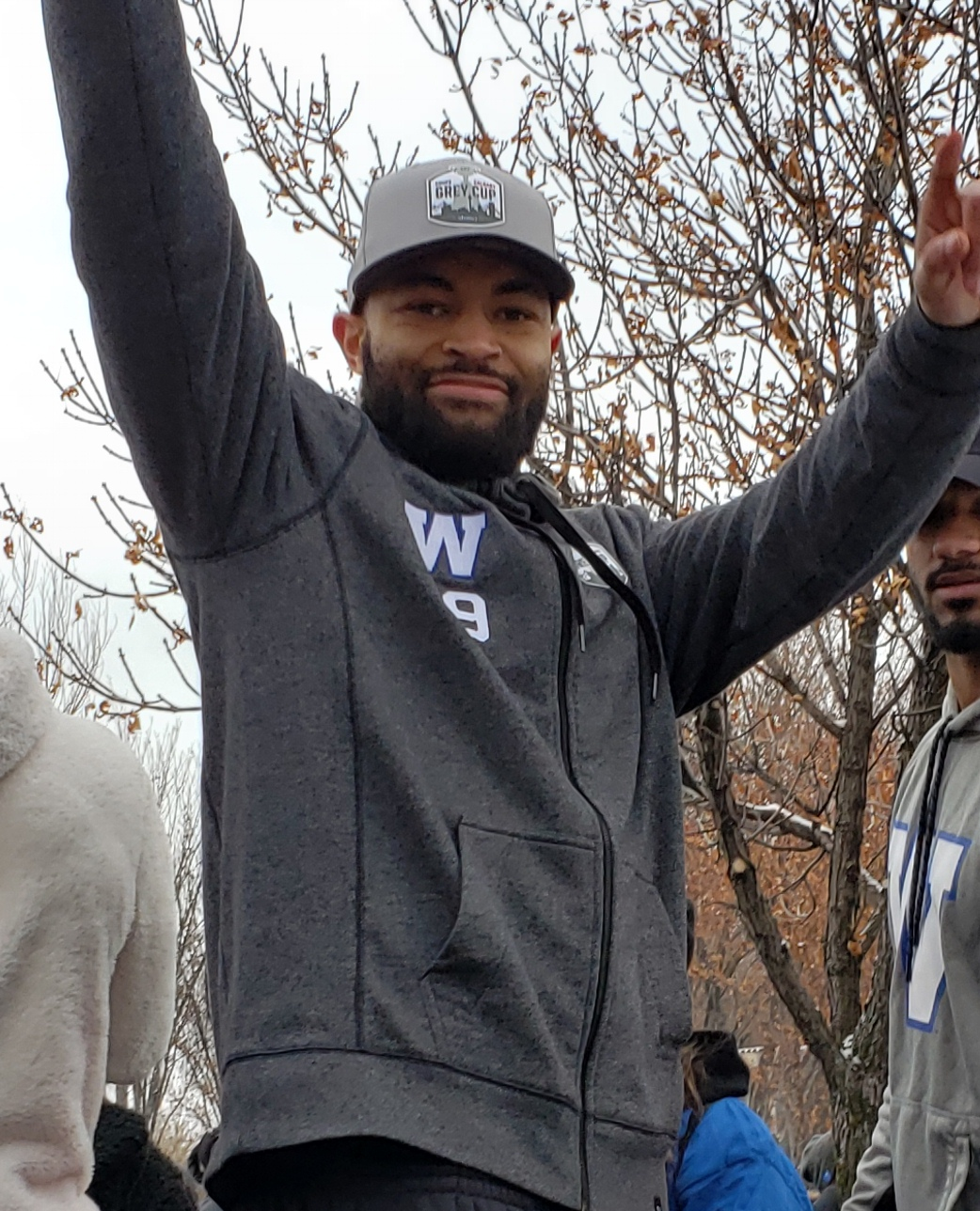
Wilson at the Winnipeg Blue Bombers 2019 Grey Cup parade.

Wilson played a key role in the Blue Bombers' defence at linebacker throughout the 2019 Winnipeg Blue Bombers season as he started in all 18 regular season games, recording 63 defensive tackles, three sacks, and an interception. Wilson helped the Bombers to the 107th Grey Cup in 2019. His efforts in the game included five tackles and a pass break-up on a two point conversion attempt that saw the Bombers win their first Grey Cup in 29 years and Wilson's first CFL championship.

Wilson signed a two-year extension with the Blue Bombers in January 2021, keeping him with the team through the next two seasons. He suffered a hip flexor injury in the first game of the season and did not play again until the end of September. Wilson finished the regular season with 16 tackles over seven games played. Despite the injuries he was a key part of the team that wen to defend their Grey Cup title in the 2021 CFL Final against the hometown Tiger-Cats in Hamilton. Trailing 22-10, the defence would rally the team as they would go to overtime and take the lead 33-25. There, after a tip drill with two Blue Bomber teammates, Wilson caught the pass deflected to him by Winston Rose sealing his and the team's second consecutive title. Wilson's father, step-mother, sister, and brother were all in attendance for the game and made their way down to the field to celebrate with him. Considering the season and the title in the middle of the pandemic, Wilson said that "Sometimes when you’re not able to do certain things, your mind starts to wander or you start questioning whether you still want to do it, but we were all locked in. It just shows that no matter what you go through, there’s a light at the end of the tunnel. Some stuff might be tough, but it’s all going to work out in the end."

Wilson suffered an Achilles injury early in the 2022 season and consequently missed the rest of the season. He had played in four games, recording 17 defensive tackles, one special teams tackle, and one sack prior to the injury. As he continued to recover into the 2023 season, he began the year on the injured list, but returned in week 9 against the BC Lions. He played in ten regular season games where he had 37 defensive tackles, four special teams tackles, one sack, and one forced fumble. He also played in the 110th Grey Cup, recording two defensive tackles, but the Blue Bombers lost to the Montreal Alouettes.

In 2024, Wilson again dealt with injuries which limited him to eight regular season games, starting in all of them, where he had 28 defensive tackles and one sack. He played in both post-season games, including the 111th Grey Cup where he had two defensive tackles in the Blue Bombers' 24–41 loss to the Toronto Argonauts.
