= Ricky Walker =

American gridiron football player (born 1996)

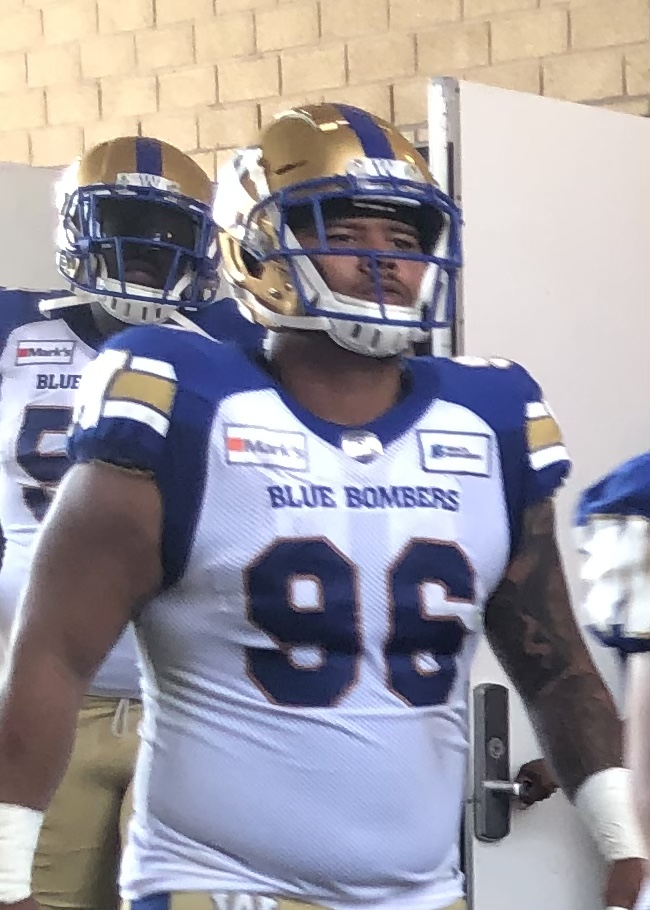
- Walker with the Blue Bombers in 2021

Profile
- Position: Defensive tackle

Personal information
- Born: April 18, 1996 (age 30); Newport News, Virginia, U.S.
- Listed height: 6 ft 2 in (1.88 m)
- Listed weight: 295 lb (134 kg)

Career information
- High school: Bethel (VA)
- College: Virginia Tech
- NFL draft: 2019: undrafted

Career history
- Dallas Cowboys (2019)*; Tampa Bay Vipers (2020); Cleveland Browns (2020)*; Winnipeg Blue Bombers (2021–2023)
- * Offseason or practice squad member only

Awards and highlights
- Second-team All-ACC (2018)
- Stats at Pro Football Reference
- Stats at CFL.ca

Ricky Walker (born April 18, 1996) is a gridiron football defensive tackle who is a free agent. He most recently played for the Winnipeg Blue Bombers of the Canadian Football League (CFL). He played college football at Virginia Tech.

== Early life ==
Walker attended Bethel High School. As a junior, he was a two-way player, making 70 tackles and 11 sacks, while receiving first-team All-district and All-region honors.

As a senior, he missed two games with an injury, finishing with 73 tackles (15 for loss) and 11 sacks, while receiving second-team All-state honors.

== College career ==
Walker accepted a football scholarship from Virginia Tech. As a true freshman, he played in 11 games as a backup defensive tackle and tallied nine tackles (one for loss). He was redshirted in 2015.

As a sophomore, he appeared in all 14 games (four starts). He registered 28 tackles (6.5 for loss), 1.5 sacks, four quarterback hurries, four pass breakups and two kickoff returns for 19 yards on special teams.

As a junior, he was named the starter at the 3-technique tackle spot. He collected 41 tackles (12.5 for loss), 4.5 sacks, six quarterback hurries, one pass break up and one fumble recovery for a touchdown.

As a senior, he was limited with a foot injury during the first half of the season. He recorded 49 tackles, 10.5 tackles for loss (led the team), two sacks and two forced fumbles. He also was a finalist for the Dudley Award, given to the top collegiate player in the state of Virginia.

== Professional career ==
=== Dallas Cowboys ===
Walker was signed as an undrafted free agent by the Dallas Cowboys, after being passed on the 2019 NFL draft because of a lack of height. He had three tackles (one for loss) and one quarterback hit in the preseason game against the San Francisco 49ers. He was waived on August 31.

=== Tampa Bay Vipers ===
In October 2019, he was selected by the Tampa Bay Vipers during phase 3 of the 2020 XFL draft. In March, amid the COVID-19 pandemic, the league announced that it would be cancelling the rest of the season. He finished the XFL's debut season with eight tackles and one quarterback hit in five games. He had his contract terminated when the league suspended operations on April 10, 2020.

=== Cleveland Browns ===
On August 22, 2020, Walker signed with the Cleveland Browns. The Browns waived Walker on September 3, 2020.

=== Winnipeg Blue Bombers ===
Walker signed with the Winnipeg Blue Bombers of the CFL on February 18, 2021. He played in his first career regular season game on August 13. He spent most of the season being moved between the practice squad and the active roster. He appeared in seven games as a backup player, making eight tackles and one sack.

In 2022, he was placed on the injured reserve list on July 3 and was activated on August 3. He was placed on the injured reserve list on November 13. He was signed to the active roster on November 20. He appeared in 12 games as a reserve player, collecting 14 tackles and one sack.

In 2023, he appeared in seven games with seven starts, making 12 tackles and three sacks. He became a free agent upon the expiry of his contract on February 13, 2024.
