= Ali Mourtada =

Sierra Leonean gridiron football player (born 1990)

No. 42
- Position: Placekicker

Personal information
- Born: August 19, 1990 (age 36); Sierra Leone
- Listed height: 5 ft 8 in (1.73 m)
- Listed weight: 158 lb (72 kg)

Career information
- High school: Foxborough High
- College: Pace

Career history
- 2015: Wichita Falls Nighthawks
- 2015: Las Vegas Outlaws
- 2018: Massachusetts Pirates
- 2021: Massachusetts Pirates
- 2021–2022: Winnipeg Blue Bombers
- Stats at CFL.ca

Ali Mourtada (born August 19, 1990) is a Sierra Leonean-American former professional football placekicker.

== Early life ==
Mourtada was born in Sierra Leone, and moved to Foxboro, Massachusetts when he was four years old.

== College career ==
Mourtada played college football for the Pace Setters from 2008 to 2011 where he played in 31 games and was successful on 14 of 27 field goal attempts. He was also the team's punter in all four years and had 66 punts for a 37.8-yard average in his senior year. He also played for the Assumption Greyhounds in 2013 while he was working on a master's degree in rehabilitation counseling.

== Professional career ==
Mourtada played in four games for the Wichita Falls Nighthawks in 2015. He then signed with the Las Vegas Outlaws in the team's only season of operation in 2015 and played in one game for the team before moving back to Foxborough in August of that year. He worked out for the Cleveland Browns in 2017, but was not offered a contract by the team. He later signed with the expansion Massachusetts Pirates on February 21, 2018, and was the team's primary kicker that year. He did not play in 2019 or 2020, but returned to play for the Pirates in 2021 following an injury to their kicker.

On August 30, 2021, it was announced that Mourtada had signed with the Winnipeg Blue Bombers following an injury to the team's incumbent placekicker, Tyler Crapigna. Following mixed results from the team's replacement kicker, Marc Liegghio, Mourtada was activated for the September 18, 2021 game against the Edmonton Elks. While he was successful on all four of his convert attempts, he missed all three of his field goal tries, missing from 28 yards, 51 yards, and 44 yards. He made his first field goal in the following game against the BC Lions on October 1, 2021. On November 21, 2022, Mourtada became a free agent.

== Personal life ==
Mourtada was born in Sierra Leone and moved to Foxborough, Massachusetts with his parents, Ahmed and Samira Mourtada, when he was four years old. He has three siblings, including older sisters Farah and Natalie and younger brother Bilal.
