= Tomoya Machino =

Japanese gridiron football player (born 1997)

No. 69
- Position: Offensive guard

Personal information
- Born: March 16, 1997 (age 29); Japan
- Listed height: 6 ft 4 in (1.93 m)
- Listed weight: 300 lb (136 kg)

Career information
- College: Kyoto

Career history
- Winnipeg Blue Bombers (2021–2023)

Awards and highlights
- Grey Cup champion (2021)
- Stats at CFL.ca

Tomoya Machino (born March 16, 1997) is a Japanese former professional gridiron football player who was an offensive guard for the Winnipeg Blue Bombers of the Canadian Football League (CFL). He played college football at Kyoto University.

== Early life and college ==
Tomoya Machino was born on March 16, 1997, in Japan. He played baseball growing up, and played the sport in high school. He is from Ōgaki.

Machino first played American football at Kyoto University. He originally wanted to be a tight end or wide receiver but was chosen to be an offensive lineman. He ate five pounds of rice every day for a year in order to put on weight needed to be a productive lineman. Machino represented Japan at the 2018 World University American Football Championship in Harbin, China. He graduated from Kyoto after playing four years of college football.

== Professional career ==
In 2020, Machino appeared at the CFL Global Combine in Japan. CFL director of global scouting Greg Quick was impressed by Machino's performance, stating “Not only did Tomoya stand out physically, but his agility for a man of his size was outstanding. He had the best shuttle time of all the o-linemen and showed that he can pull and move extremely well.”

Machino was selected by the Winnipeg Blue Bombers in the second round, with the 15th overall pick, of the 2021 CFL global draft. He officially signed with the team on June 15 and was placed on the practice roster on July 31. Machino's roster status in the CFL was "Global". On December 12, 2021, the Blue Bombers won the 108th Grey Cup against the Hamilton Tiger-Cats by a score of 33–25. Machino was released on December 13, 2021.

Machino later re-signed with Winnipeg on April 27, 2022, and was placed on the practice roster again on June 5. He was promoted to the active roster for the first time on August 24, and dressed for the week 12 game against the Calgary Stampeders. He was moved back to the practice roster on August 31. Machino was promoted to the active roster for the second time on October 14, and dressed for two games, before being placed on injured reserve on November 12, 2022.

Machino was moved back to the practice roster again the next year, on June 4, 2023. He was released by the Blue Bombers on November 20, 2023.
