= 2020 Toronto Argonauts season =

CFL team season

- General manager: Michael Clemons
- Head coach: Ryan Dinwiddie
- Home stadium: BMO Field

Results
- Record: N/A
- Division place: N/A, East
- Playoffs: Season cancelled

The 2020 Toronto Argonauts season was scheduled to be the 63rd season for the team in the Canadian Football League (CFL) and their 148th year of existence. This would have been the first full season with Michael Clemons as general manager following his appointment mid-way through the 2019 season. This would have also been the first season for head coach Ryan Dinwiddie.

Training camps, pre-season games, and regular season games were initially postponed due to the COVID-19 pandemic in Toronto. The CFL announced on April 7, 2020, that the start of the 2020 season would not occur before July 2020. On May 20, 2020, it was announced that the league would likely not begin regular season play prior to September 2020. On August 17, 2020, however, the season was officially cancelled due to COVID-19.

== Offseason ==
=== Personnel changes ===
Following the end of a disappointing season for first-year head coach, Corey Chamblin, new general manager, Michael Clemons, stated that Chamblin's position would undergo a thorough review. Over a month later, on December 12, 2019, it was announced that Chamblin would be relieved of his coaching duties and Ryan Dinwiddie would be named the team's new head coach, the 45th in team history.

== CFL national draft ==
The 2020 CFL National Draft took place on April 30, 2020. The Argonauts held the second selection in each round of the draft by virtue of finishing second to last in the 2019 league standings, less any traded picks. They obtained another first-round pick and gained a third-round pick after trading Zach Collaros and a fifth-round pick to the Winnipeg Blue Bombers. To acquire Collaros, the Argonauts traded their fourth-round pick to the Saskatchewan Roughriders. The team swapped a third-round pick for a fifth-round pick with the Montreal Alouettes that saw the club acquire Ryan Bomben. The Argonauts traded a seventh-round pick and Martese Jackson to Edmonton in exchange for a third-round pick in the 2019 CFL draft. The team also traded an eighth-round selection to Montreal in exchange for Boseko Lokombo.

The team also gained a territorial selection for the second consecutive year after finishing in the bottom two of the previous year's standings.

| Round | Pick | Player | Position | School | Hometown |
|---|---|---|---|---|---|
| 1 | 2 | Dejon Brissett | WR | Virginia | Mississauga, ON |
| 1 | 9 | Theren Churchill | OL | Regina | Stettler, AB |
| 2 | 11 | Jack Cassar | LB | Carleton | Mississauga, ON |
| 3 | 20T | Samuel Acheampong | DL | Wilfrid Laurier | Brampton, ON |
| 3 | 28 | Dylan Giffen | OL | Western | Strathroy, ON |
| 5 | 42 | Dion Pellerin | RB | Waterloo | Abbotsford, BC |
| 6 | 48 | Samuel Baker | WR | Saskatchewan | Esterhazy, SK |

=== CFL global draft ===
The 2020 CFL global draft was scheduled to take place on April 16, 2020. However, due to the COVID-19 pandemic, this draft and its accompanying combine were postponed to occur just before the start of training camp, which was ultimately cancelled. The Argonauts were scheduled to select second in each round with the number of rounds never announced.

== Planned schedule ==
=== Preseason ===
For the third consecutive season, the Argonauts were scheduled to play their home pre-season game at a U Sports football stadium.

| Week | Game | Date | Kickoff | Opponent | TV | Venue |
|---|---|---|---|---|---|---|
| A | Bye | | | | | |
| B | 1 | Thu, May 28 | 11:00 a.m. EDT | vs. Hamilton Tiger-Cats | NA | Varsity Stadium |
| C | 2 | Sat, June 6 | 1:00 p.m. EDT | at Montreal Alouettes | NA | Molson Stadium |

== Regular season ==
The Argonauts were scheduled to be the home team for a neutral site game for the Week 7 match-up with the Saskatchewan Roughriders. The league had been contemplating returning to Moncton, having been there in the previous season, but it was officially announced on January 23, 2020, that a Touchdown Atlantic game would be played in Halifax at Huskies Stadium. However, due to the COVID-19 pandemic, it was announced on May 20, 2020, that the game was cancelled.

| Week | Game | Date | Kickoff | Opponent | TV | Venue |
|---|---|---|---|---|---|---|
| 1 | 1 | Fri, June 12 | 7:00 p.m. EDT | at Ottawa Redblacks | TSN | TD Place Stadium |
| 2 | 2 | Sat, June 20 | 7:00 p.m. EDT | vs. Hamilton Tiger-Cats | TSN | BMO Field |
| 3 | Bye | | | | | |
| 4 | 3 | Sat, July 4 | 7:00 p.m. EDT | vs. Calgary Stampeders | TSN | BMO Field |
| 5 | 4 | Sat, July 11 | 7:00 p.m. EDT | at Saskatchewan Roughriders | TSN | Mosaic Stadium |
| 6 | 5 | Fri, July 17 | 9:30 p.m. EDT | at Edmonton Football Team | TSN | Commonwealth Stadium |
| 7 | 6 | Sat, July 25 | 4:00 p.m. EDT | vs. Saskatchewan Roughriders | TSN | Huskies Stadium |
| 8 | 7 | Fri, July 31 | 7:00 p.m. EDT | vs. Winnipeg Blue Bombers | TSN | BMO Field |
| 9 | 8 | Sat, August 8 | 7:00 p.m. EDT | at Calgary Stampeders | TSN | McMahon Stadium |
| 10 | Bye | | | | | |
| 11 | 9 | Sat, August 22 | 4:00 p.m. EDT | vs. Hamilton Tiger-Cats | TSN | BMO Field |
| 12 | 10 | Fri, August 28 | 7:00 p.m. EDT | vs. Montreal Alouettes | TSN/RDS | BMO Field |
| 13 | 11 | Mon, Sept 7 | 1:00 p.m. EDT | at Hamilton Tiger-Cats | TSN | Tim Hortons Field |
| 14 | 12 | Sat, Sept 12 | 10:00 p.m. EDT | at BC Lions | TSN | BC Place |
| 15 | 13 | Sat, Sept 19 | 4:00 p.m. EDT | vs. Ottawa Redblacks | TSN | BMO Field |
| 16 | 14 | Sat, Sept 26 | 7:00 p.m. EDT | at Ottawa Redblacks | TSN | TD Place Stadium |
| 17 | 15 | Fri, Oct 2 | 7:00 p.m. EDT | vs. BC Lions | TSN | BMO Field |
| 18 | 16 | Mon, Oct 12 | 1:00 p.m. EDT | at Montreal Alouettes | TSN/RDS | Molson Stadium |
| 19 | 17 | Sat, Oct 17 | 7:00 p.m. EDT | at Winnipeg Blue Bombers | TSN | IG Field |
| 20 | Bye | | | | | |
| 21 | 18 | Sat, Oct 31 | 1:00 p.m. EDT | vs. Edmonton Football Team | TSN | BMO Field |

== Team ==
=== Roster ===
Toronto Argonauts roster
| **Quarterbacks**: 4 McLeod Bethel-Thompson; -- Matt Nichols; 13 Michael O'Connor; **Receivers**: -- Natey Adjei; -- Dres Anderson; -- Joel Blumenthal QB/WR; -- Juwan Brescacin; -- DaVaris Daniels; -- Jawill Davis; -- Keyarris Garrett; 80 Kurleigh Gittens, Jr.; 83 Damion Jeanpiere; -- Kyle Lewis; -- Vince Mayle; -- Nyquan Murray; 84 Llevi Noel; -- Kent Shelby; -- Brandon Sheperd; -- Kwadarrius Smith; 00 Chandler Worthy; -- Isaac Zico | **Running backs**: -- Trayone Gray; 34 AJ Ouellette; 33 Bishop Sankey; -- Marcus Thigpen; -- Karlos Williams; **Fullbacks**: 25 Régis Cibasu; 38 Declan Cross; **Offensive linemen**: -- Jatitus Allen; -- Dariusz Bladek; -- Dontavius Blair; -- Philip Blake; 66 Isiah Cage; 67 Jamal Campbell; 50 Roubbens Joseph; -- Norman Price; 59 Randy Richards; 68 Shane Richards; 62 Maurice Simba; -- Eric Starczala | **Defensive linemen**: -- Alex Bazzie; -- Ryan Davis; -- Fabion Foote; -- Obinna Iheoma; -- Julian McCleod; -- Rickey Neal; -- Drake Nevis; -- Earl Okine; -- Ronald Ollie; -- Craig Roh; -- Whitney Richardson; 39 Robbie Smith; 42 Jhaustin Thomas; -- Prince Unaegbu; **Linebackers**: -- Chris Ackie; -- Curtis Akins; -- Jason Beck; -- Travis Feeney; 54 Kennan Gilchrist; -- Jeff Knox Jr.; -- Paul Kozachuk; 12 Nelkas Kwemo; -- Boseko Lokombo; -- Jordan Moore; -- Nick Shortill; 48 Bear Woods | **Defensive backs**: 28 Matthew Boateng; 20 Jalin Burrell; -- Crezdon Butler; -- Tommie Campbell; -- Arjen Colquhoun; 3 Alden Darby; 16 Cam Glenn; -- Chris Humes; -- Stanley Jean-Baptiste; -- Ermon Lane; -- Travis Lee; -- Davontae Merriweather; -- Jordan Powell; -- Denzel Radford; -- Malik Reaves; -- Jeff Richards; 1 Shaquille Richardson; -- James Sample; -- Kadeem Satchell; 7 Robert Woodson; -- Dondre Wright; **Special teams**: -- Boris Bede K; 58 Jake Reinhart LS |
Italics indicate American player • **Bold** indicates Global player • 89 Roster; Roster updated 2020-08-17 • Depth chart • Transactions (argonauts.ca) • Transactions (cfl.ca)

=== Coaching staff ===
Toronto Argonauts staff
| **Front office and support staff**: Owner – Maple Leaf Sports & Entertainment; President – Bill Manning; General manager – Michael Clemons; Director of player personnel – John Murphy; Director of Canadian scouting – Vince Magri; Player relations advisor and football ops assistant – Matt Black; Coordinator of logistics – Alex Russell; Equipment manager – Danny Webb; Assistant equipment manager – David Sillberg; Head athletic therapist – Josh Shewell; Assistant athletic therapist – Mark Belmore | **Head coaches**: Head coach – Ryan Dinwiddie; **Offensive coaches**: Offensive coordinator and quarterbacks – Jarious Jackson; Receivers – Markus Howell; Running backs – Fred Reid; Offensive line – Stephen McAdoo; **Defensive coaches**: Defensive coordinator – Glen Young; Defensive backs – Ike Charlton; Linebackers – Kevin Eiben; Defensive line – Mike Davis; Defensive assistant – Merritt Bowden; **Special teams coaches**: Special teams coordinator – Mark Nelson; Assistant special teams – Kevin Eiben; Assistant special teams – Merritt Bowden; → Coaching staff |
