= 2019 Toronto Argonauts season =

CFL team season

- General manager: Jim Popp (2–12); Michael "Pinball" Clemons (2–2)
- Head coach: Corey Chamblin
- Home stadium: BMO Field

Results
- Record: 4–14
- Division place: 3rd, East
- Playoffs: did not qualify
- Team MOP: Derel Walker
- Team MOC: Cleyon Laing
- Team MOR: Kennan Gilchrist

Uniform

The 2019 Toronto Argonauts season was the 62nd season for the team in the Canadian Football League (CFL) and their 147th season overall. The Argonauts finished with a 4–14 record, matching their win–loss record from a year prior, and did not qualify for the playoffs for the second consecutive season.

This was the third season with Jim Popp as general manager and first for new head coach Corey Chamblin who replaced Marc Trestman following a disappointing campaign in 2018 (failing to meet expectations following a Grey Cup victory in 2017). On October 8, 2019, Popp was relieved as general manager of the team, and was replaced by Michael "Pinball" Clemons with 4 games remaining in the season. The announcement about Jim Popp being relieved of his duties came not long after the Argonauts were eliminated from playoff contention during regular season play for the second consecutive season. Their week 17 loss at BC Place against the BC Lions marked the second consecutive year the Argonauts were eliminated from playoff contention, having won only 4 games in 2018.

== Offseason ==
=== Foreign drafts ===
For the first time in its history, the CFL held drafts for foreign players from Mexico and Europe. Like all other CFL teams, the Argonauts held three non-tradeable selections in the 2019 CFL–LFA draft, which took place on January 14, 2019. The 2019 European CFL draft took place on April 11, 2019, where all teams held one non-tradeable pick.

Draft	Round	Pick	Player	Position	School/Club
LFA	1	4	Uriel Bernal	DE	UANL
LFA	2	13	Jose Casarrubias	DE	UANM
LFA	3	22	Christian Hernández	LB	Fundidores de Monterrey
Euro	1	5	Marc Hor	DL	Frankfurt Universe

=== CFL draft ===
The 2019 CFL draft took place on May 2, 2019. The Argonauts had the first selection in each round of the draft by virtue of finishing last in league standings, less any traded picks. Consequently, the club selected first overall for the first time since the 1997 CFL draft and hold nine selections in total. The Argos acquired another third-round pick from the Edmonton Eskimos after trading Martese Jackson to them. The team also acquired another seventh-round selection after trading Brian Jones to the Saskatchewan Roughriders and sent their eighth-round pick to Hamilton in exchange for Abdul Kanneh.

Round	Pick	Player	Position	School	Hometown
1	1	Shane Richards	OL	Oklahoma State	Calgary, AB
2	9	Robbie Smith	DL	Wilfrid Laurier	Brampton, ON
2	18	Matthew Boateng	DB	Fresno State	Toronto, ON
3	20	Michael O'Connor	QB	British Columbia	Orleans, ON
3	23	Kurleigh Gittens, Jr.	WR	Wilfrid Laurier	Ottawa, ON
4	29	Maurice Simba	OL	Concordia	Laval, QC
5	38	Jamie Harry	DB	Ottawa	Lachine, QC
6	47	Joe Spaziani	LS	Virginia	Hingham, MA, USA
7	56	Phil Iloki	WR	Carleton	Montreal, QC
7	62	Eric Starczala	OL	Guelph	Cambridge, ON

== Preseason ==
The Argonauts' home preseason game was played at the University of Toronto's Varsity Stadium with tickets being sold to students from Greater Toronto Area schools.

=== Schedule ===
Week	Game	Date	Kickoff	Opponent	Results		TV	Venue	Attendance	Summary
Week	Game	Date	Kickoff	Opponent	Score	Record	TV	Venue	Attendance	Summary
A	Bye									
B	1	Thu, May 30	11:00 a.m. EDT	Montreal Alouettes	W 45–20	1–0	None	Varsity Stadium	4,313	Recap
C	2	Thu, June 6	7:30 p.m. EDT	@ Hamilton Tiger-Cats	W 30–23	2–0	Ticats.ca	Tim Hortons Field	NA	Recap

# Games played with colour uniforms.

== Regular season ==
=== Standings ===
East Division
Team	GP	W	L	T	Pts	PF	PA	Div	Stk	
Hamilton Tiger-Cats	18	15	3	0	30	551	344	7–1	W6	Details
Montreal Alouettes	18	10	8	0	20	479	485	5–3	W1	Details
Toronto Argonauts	18	4	14	0	8	373	562	3–5	L1	Details
Ottawa Redblacks	18	3	15	0	6	312	564	1–7	L11	Details

=== Schedule ===
The Argonauts home opener against the Hamilton Tiger-Cats was originally slated for a 7:00pm start local time. At the request of the Hamilton Tiger-Cats' fan base, kickoff was adjusted to a 4:00pm start in lieu of a concert at 8:00pm at a nearby venue. In week 11, the Argonauts were the "home" team as they played the Montreal Alouettes in the fourth regular season installment of Touchdown Atlantic in Moncton, New Brunswick.

Week	Game	Date	Kickoff	Opponent	Results		TV	Venue	Attendance	Summary
Week	Game	Date	Kickoff	Opponent	Score	Record	TV	Venue	Attendance	Summary
1	Bye									
2	1	Sat, June 22	4:00 p.m. EDT	Hamilton Tiger-Cats	L 14–64	0–1	TSN/RDS	BMO Field	16,734	Recap
3	2	Mon, July 1	7:00 p.m. EDT	@ Saskatchewan Roughriders	L 7–32	0–2	TSN/RDS2	Mosaic Stadium	30,121	Recap
4	3	Sat, July 6	7:00 p.m. EDT	BC Lions	L 17–18	0–3	TSN	BMO Field	11,428	Recap
5	4	Fri, July 12	8:30 p.m. EDT	@ Winnipeg Blue Bombers	L 21–48	0–4	TSN/RDS	IG Field	24,187	Recap
6	5	Thu, July 18	9:00 p.m. EDT	@ Calgary Stampeders	L 16–26	0–5	TSN/ESPN2	McMahon Stadium	23,355	Recap
7	6	Thu, July 25	9:30 p.m. EDT	@ Edmonton Eskimos	L 0–26	0–6	TSN	Commonwealth Stadium	30,368	Recap
8	7	Thu, Aug 1	7:00 p.m. EDT	Winnipeg Blue Bombers	W 28–27	1–6	TSN/RDS/ESPN2	BMO Field	12,072	Recap
9	Bye									
10	8	Fri, Aug 16	7:30 p.m. EDT	Edmonton Eskimos	L 26–41	1–7	TSN/RDS2	BMO Field	16,490	Recap
11	9	Sun, Aug 25	12:00 p.m. EDT	Montreal Alouettes	L 22–28	1–8	TSN/RDS/ESPNews	Croix-Bleue Medavie Stadium	10,126	Recap
12	10	Mon, Sept 2	1:00 p.m. EDT	@ Hamilton Tiger-Cats	L 27–38	1–9	TSN	Tim Hortons Field	25,093	Recap
13	11	Sat, Sept 7	1:00 p.m. EDT	@ Ottawa Redblacks	W 46–17	2–9	TSN/RDS2	TD Place Stadium	22,489	Recap
14	Bye									
15	12	Fri, Sept 20	7:00 p.m. EDT	Calgary Stampeders	L 16–23	2–10	TSN/RDS2	BMO Field	9,819	Recap
16	13	Sat, Sept 28	7:00 p.m. EDT	Saskatchewan Roughriders	L 16–41	2–11	TSN	BMO Field	12,406	Recap
17	14	Sat, Oct 5	10:00 p.m. EDT	@ BC Lions	L 8–55	2–12	TSN	BC Place	16,786	Recap
18	15	Fri, Oct 11	7:00 p.m. EDT	Ottawa Redblacks	W 28–21	3–12	TSN/RDS2/ESPNews	BMO Field	10,368	Recap
19	16	Fri, Oct 18	7:00 p.m. EDT	@ Montreal Alouettes	L 24–27	3–13	TSN/RDS/ESPNews	Molson Stadium	17,003	Recap
20	17	Sat, Oct 26	4:00 p.m. EDT	Ottawa Redblacks	W 39–9	4–13	TSN/RDS	BMO Field	12,995	Recap
21	18	Sat, Nov 2	7:00 p.m. EDT	@ Hamilton Tiger-Cats	L 18–21	4–14	TSN	Tim Hortons Field	22,804	Recap

# Games played with colour uniforms.
# Games played with white uniforms.

== Roster ==
2019 Toronto Argonauts final roster
**Quarterbacks**: 4 McLeod Bethel-Thompson; 8 James Franklin; 13 Michael O'Conner; 9 Dakota Prukop; **Running backs**: 25 Régis Cibasu; 39 Declan Cross; 34 A. J. Ouellette; 32 James Wilder Jr.; **Receivers**: 11 Alex Charette; 10 Armanti Edwards; 80 Kurleigh Gittens; 19 S. J. Green; 84 Llevi Noel; 88 Jimmy Ralph; 81 Rodney Smith	**Offensive linemen**: 64 Ryan Bomben G; 67 Jamal Campbell T; 57 Tyler Holmes G; 61 Sean McEwen C; 59 Randy Richards T; 68 Shane Richards G/T; 62 Maurice Simba G; **Defensive linemen**: 95 Hassan Barry DT; 94 Frank Beltre DE; 56 Freddie Bishop DE; 93 Linden Gaydosh DT; 53 Kennan Gilchrist DE; 39 Robbie Smith DE; 42 Jhaustin Thomas DT	**Linebackers**: 0 Tobi Antigha; 49 Juwan Foggie; 73 Christian Hernández; 12 Nelkas Kwemo; 6 Nakas Onyeka; 27 Eric Striker; **Defensive backs**: 20 Jalin Burrell; 37 Anthony Covington; 3 Alden Darby; 21 Qudarius Ford; 5 Jermaine Gabriel; 1 Shaquille Richardson; 36 Trumaine Washington; 7 Robert Woodson	**Special teams**: 46 Zack Medeiros P/K; 17 Ronnie Pfeffer P/K; 58 Jake Reinhart LS; **Practice roster**: 91 Jose Casarrubias DT; 50 Roubbens Joseph T; 85 Kimi Linnainmaa WR; 52 Joe Spaziani LS; **Suspended**: Donald De La Haye K; Mathieu Loiselle LB	**Injured list**: 51 Micah Awe LB; 28 Matt Boateng DB; 35 Brandon Burks RB; 66 Isiah Cage T; 23 Davon Coleman DT; 30 Tyler Crapigna K; 24 Jonathan Dowling DB; 26 Kevin Fogg DB; 16 Cameron Glenn DB; 99 Sean Harrington LB; 45 Justin Herdman-Reed LB; 14 Abdul Kanneh DB; 90 Cleyon Laing DT; 29 Jonathon Mincy DB; 2 Chris Rainey RB; 87 Derel Walker WR; 44 Ian Wild LB; 48 Bear Woods LB; 00 Chandler Worthy WR; Italics indicate American player **Bold** indicates Global player

== Coaching staff ==
Toronto Argonauts staff
Front office and support staff: Owner – Maple Leaf Sports & Entertainment; President – Bill Manning; General manager – Michael Clemons; Director of player personnel – John Murphy; Director of canadian scouting – Vince Magri; Player relations advisor and football ops assistant – Matt Black; Coordinator of logistics – Alex Russell; Equipment manager – Danny Webb; Assistant equipment manager – David Sillberg; Head athletic therapist – Josh Shewell; Assistant athletic therapist – Mark Belmore	Head coaches: Head coach – Corey Chamblin; Offensive coaches: Offensive coordinator and receivers – Jacques Chapdelaine; Quarterbacks – Jonathan Crompton; Running backs – Justin Poindexter; Offensive line – Dan Dorazio; Defensive coaches: Defensive coordinator – Corey Chamblin; Defensive backs – Tyron Brackenridge; Linebackers – Kevin Eiben; Defensive line – Kerry Locklin; Defensive line – Carey Bailey; Special teams coaches: Special teams coordinator – Cory McDiarmid; Assistant special teams – Dave Jackson; → Coaching staff
