= Kerfalla Exumé =

Canadian gridiron football player (born 1994)

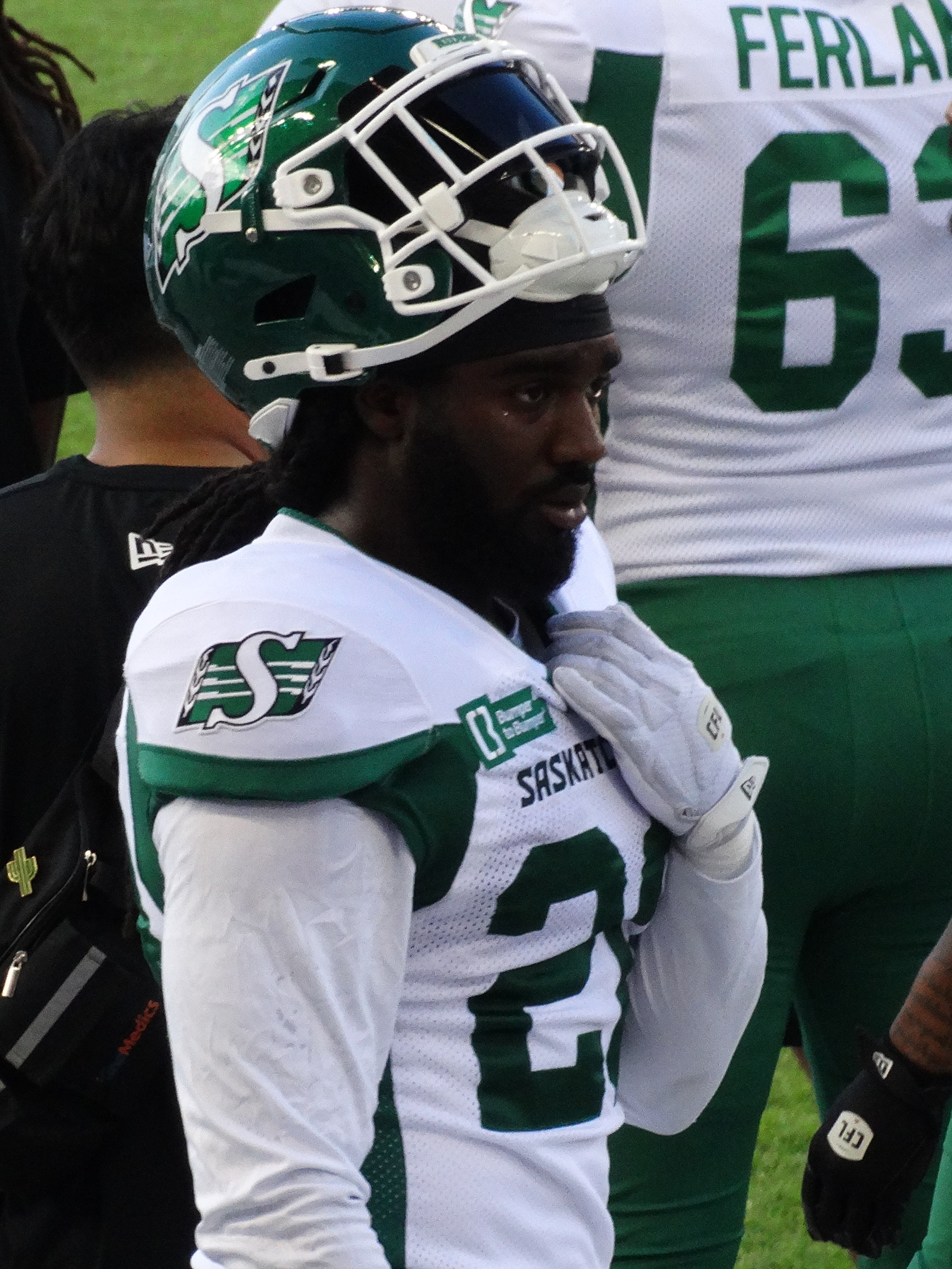
- Exumé with the Saskatchewan Roughriders in 2025

No. 20 – Saskatchewan Roughriders
- Position: Defensive back
- Roster status: Active
- CFL status: National

Personal information
- Born: February 24, 1994 (age 32); Montreal, Quebec, Canada
- Listed height: 5 ft 11 in (1.80 m)
- Listed weight: 195 lb (88 kg)

Career information
- University: Montréal
- CFL draft: 2019: 8th round, 70th overall pick

Career history
- 2019–2020: Winnipeg Blue Bombers
- 2021–2023: Montreal Alouettes
- 2023: Winnipeg Blue Bombers
- 2024: Toronto Argonauts
- 2024–present: Saskatchewan Roughriders

Awards and highlights
- 3× Grey Cup champion (2019, 2024, 2025)
- Stats at CFL.ca

Kerfalla Emmanuel Exumé (born February 24, 1994) is a Canadian professional football defensive back for the Saskatchewan Roughriders of the Canadian Football League (CFL). He is a two-time Grey Cup champion after winning with the Winnipeg Blue Bombers in 2019 and with the Toronto Argonauts in 2024.

== University career ==
Exumé played U Sports football for the Montréal Carabins.

== Professional career ==
Pre-draft measurables
Height	Weight	40-yard dash	20-yard shuttle	Three-cone drill	Vertical jump	Broad jump	Bench press
5 ft 10 7/8 in (1.80 m)	194 lb (88 kg)	4.73 s	4.40 s	7.31 s	28.0 in (0.71 m)	9 ft 0 1/4 in (2.75 m)	16 reps
All values from CFL Combine

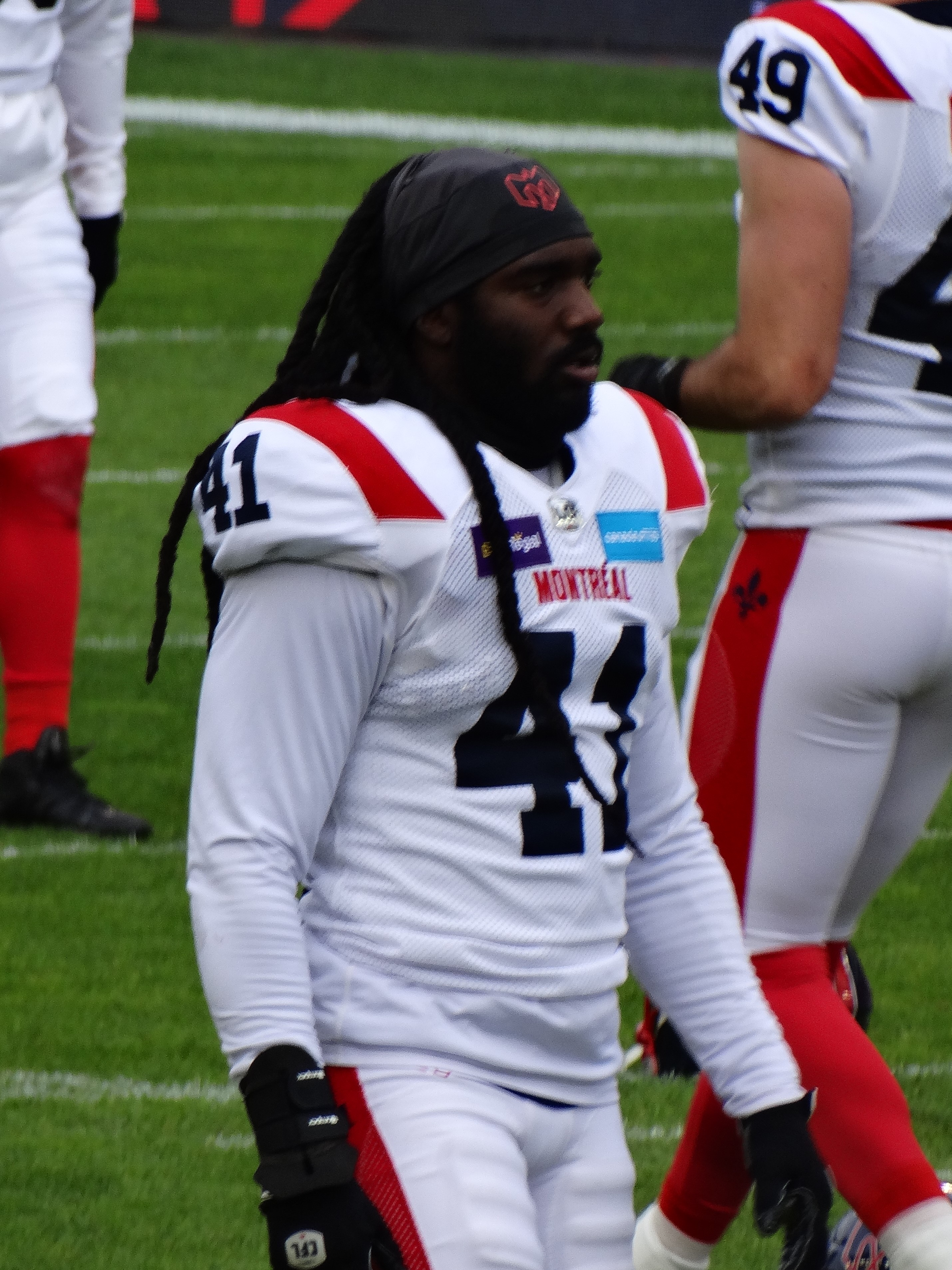
Exumé with the Montreal Alouettes in 2022

=== Winnipeg Blue Bombers (first stint) ===
Exumé was drafted in the eighth round, 70th overall, in the 2019 CFL draft by the Winnipeg Blue Bombers and was signed on May 15, 2019. In his professional debut, on June 15, 2019, he recorded five special teams tackles against the BC Lions. He played in all 18 regular season games and finished second in the league with 25 special teams tackles made. He also played in all three of the Blue Bombers' post-season games and was part of the 107th Grey Cup championship team. He did not play in 2020 due to the cancellation of the 2020 CFL season. He became a free agent in 2021.

=== Montreal Alouettes ===
On February 10, 2021, it was announced that Exumé had signed with the Montreal Alouettes. He played in all 14 regular season games in 2021 where he had 15 special teams tackles and three defensive tackles. In 2022, he played in 18 regular season games, but managed just six special teams tackles.

Exumé re-signed with the Alouettes on February 20, 2023. However, he did not dress in either of the first two games of the season and was released on June 29, 2023.

=== Winnipeg Blue Bombers (second stint) ===
Shortly after his release from Montreal, Exumé signed again with the Blue Bombers on July 4, 2023. He played in 14 regular season games where he had two defensive tackles and 17 special teams tackles. Exumé played in his second Grey Cup game, but the Blue Bombers were defeated by his former team, the Montreal Alouettes, in the 110th Grey Cup game. He became a free agent upon the expiry of his contract on February 13, 2024.

=== Toronto Argonauts ===
On February 13, 2024, it was announced that Exumé had signed with the Toronto Argonauts. In the 2024 season, he played in 12 regular season games, sitting out six due to injury, where he had eight special teams tackles. He also played in all three post-season games, including the 111th Grey Cup where he didn't record a statistic, but shared in the Argonauts' 41–24 victory over the Winnipeg Blue Bombers. He again played in 17 games in 2024. He became a free agent upon the expiry of his contract on February 11, 2025.

=== Saskatchewan Roughriders ===
On February 12, 2025, it was announced that Exumé had signed a contract with the Saskatchewan Roughriders.

== Personal life ==
Exumé was born to parents Emmanuella and Sonny Exumé. He has three older siblings, Bouba, Moussa, and Sadiya.
