= Jamie Harry =

Canadian gridiron football player (born 1994)

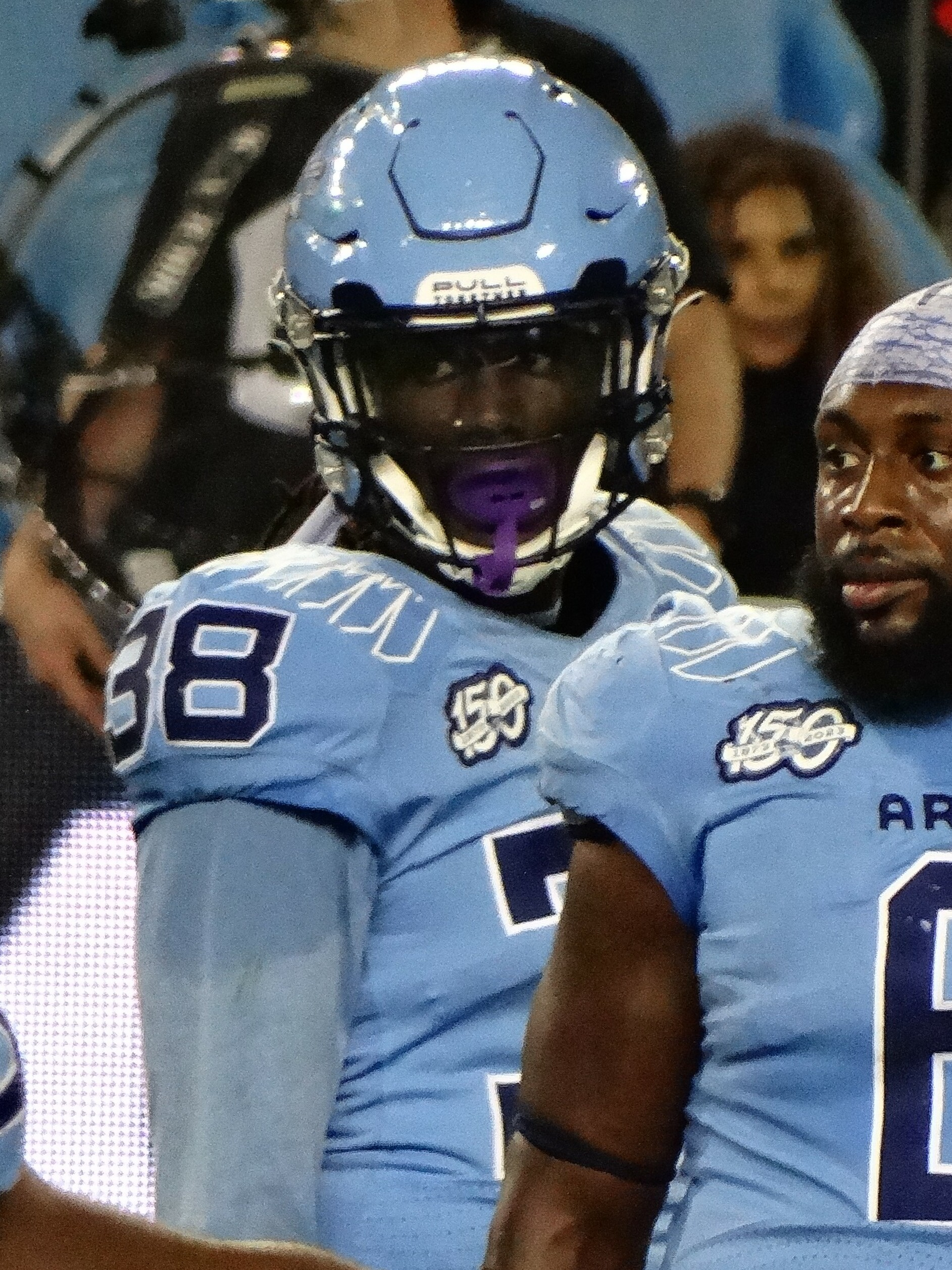
- Harry with the Toronto Argonauts in 2023

Profile
- Position: Defensive back

Personal information
- Born: July 13, 1994 (age 32); Lachine, Quebec, Canada
- Listed height: 6 ft 1 in (1.85 m)
- Listed weight: 217 lb (98 kg)

Career information
- High school: Vanier College
- University: Ottawa Gee-Gees
- CFL draft: 2019: 5th round, 38th overall pick

Career history
- 2019: Toronto Argonauts*
- 2019–2022: BC Lions
- 2022–2023: Edmonton Elks
- 2023–2024: Toronto Argonauts
- * Offseason or practice squad member only

Awards and highlights
- Grey Cup champion (2024); 2× First-team All-Canadian (2017, 2018)
- Stats at CFL.ca

Jamie Harry (born July 13, 1994) is a Canadian professional football defensive back. He most recently played for the Toronto Argonauts of the Canadian Football League (CFL).

== University career ==
Harry played U Sports football for the Ottawa Gee-Gees from 2015 to 2018. He had 98 solo tackles and 14 interceptions. He was also named a U Sports First Team All-Canadian in 2017 and 2018.

== Professional career ==
Pre-draft measurables
Height	Weight	40-yard dash	20-yard shuttle	Three-cone drill	Vertical jump	Broad jump	Bench press
6 ft 1 1/2 in (1.87 m)	200 lb (91 kg)	4.79 s	4.25 s	7.16 s	32.5 in (0.83 m)	9 ft 10 1/4 in (3.00 m)	0 reps
All values from CFL Combine

=== Toronto Argonauts (first stint) ===
Harry was drafted 38th overall in the 2019 CFL draft by the Toronto Argonauts and signed with the team on May 16, 2019. He attended training camp with the Argonauts in 2019, but was released with the final cuts on June 7, 2019.

=== BC Lions ===
On September 9, 2019, Harry signed a practice roster agreement with the BC Lions. He made his professional debut on October 18, 2019, against the Saskatchewan Roughriders, but reverted to the practice roster following the game. He re-signed with the Lions following the end of the season, but did not play in 2020 due to the cancellation of the 2020 CFL season.

In 2021, Harry played in 10 regular season games where he had six defensive tackles and two special teams tackles. To begin the 2022 season, he played in the team's first two regular season games, but was released on July 19, 2022.

=== Edmonton Elks ===
Harry signed with the Edmonton Elks on July 29, 2022. He was featured prominently on defence as he played in nine regular season games and had 18 defensive tackles. He re-signed with the Elks on January 17, 2023. On May 28, 2023, Harry was released by the Elks.

=== Toronto Argonauts (second stint) ===
On August 31, 2023, Harry signed a practice roster agreement with the Argonauts. In 2023, he played in five regular season games, starting in three, where he had 12 defensive tackles. He also made his post-season debut in the East Final, but the Argonauts were upset by the Alouettes.

In the 2024 season, Harry was on the injured list for the entire season, including in the Argonauts' victory in the 111th Grey Cup championship over the Winnipeg Blue Bombers. He became a free agent upon the expiry of his contract on February 11, 2025.
