= Maleek Irons =

Canadian gridiron football player (born 1996)

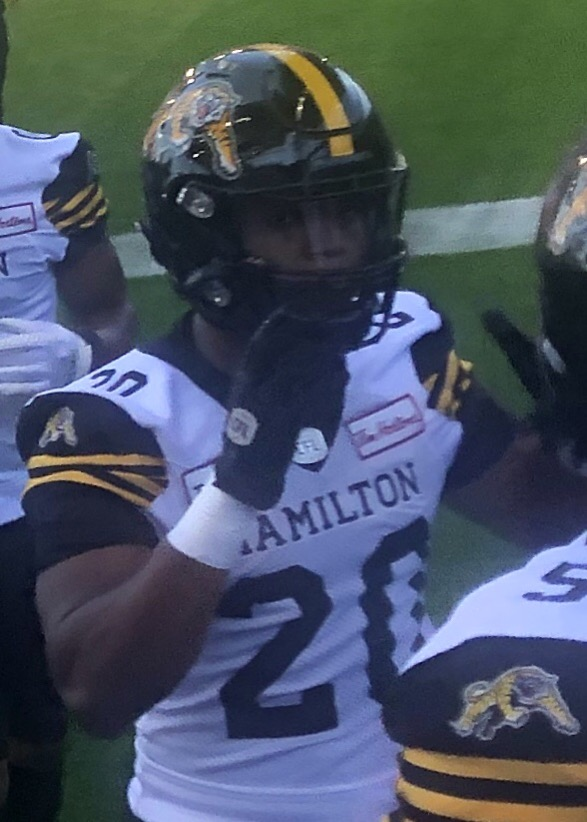
- Irons with the Hamilton Tiger-Cats in 2019

Profile
- Position: Running back

Personal information
- Born: June 29, 1996 (age 30); Calgary, Alberta, Canada
- Listed height: 6 ft 0 in (1.83 m)
- Listed weight: 230 lb (104 kg)

Career information
- College: Ohio
- CFL draft: 2019: 3rd round, 22nd overall pick

Career history
- 2019–2022: Hamilton Tiger-Cats
- 2022: Edmonton Elks
- Stats at CFL.ca

Maleek Irons (born June 29, 1996) is a Canadian former professional football running back. He was drafted in the third round, 22nd overall by the Hamilton Tiger-Cats of the Canadian Football League (CFL) in the 2019 CFL draft and he signed with the team on May 17, 2019. He played college football with the Ohio Bobcats from 2014 to 2018. Irons was also a member of the Edmonton Elks.

== Professional career ==
=== Hamilton Tiger-Cats ===
Irons played in 11 games in each of his first two seasons in Hamilton. In his rookie season he carried the ball 50 times for 208 yards with one rushing touchdown. He also caught 10 passes for 59 yards. In his second season in the league Irons saw half as many carries (23) and gained 113 yards on the ground. He also caught eight passes for 48 yards. After playing two games during the 2022 season Irons was released by the Tiger-Cats on July 12, 2022.

=== Edmonton Elks ===
On July 17, 2022, the Edmonton Elks announced the signing of Irons. He played in five games in for Edmonton during the 2022 CFL season, where he had 19 carries for 73 yards and one touchdown. Irons was placed on the team's retired list on October 6, 2022.
