= Jesse Gibbon =

Canadian football player (born 1997)

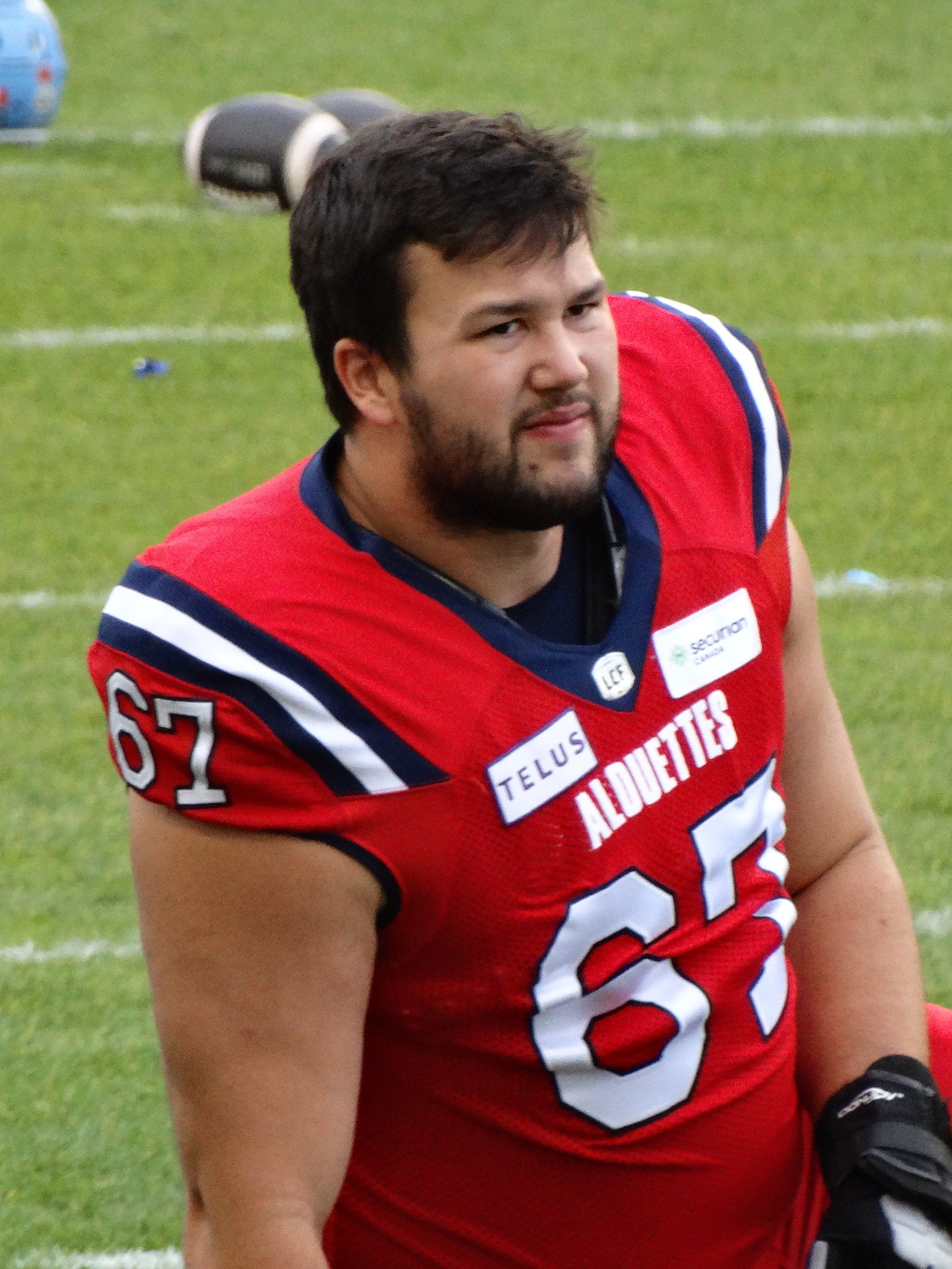
- Gibbon with the Montreal Alouettes in 2023

Profile
- Position: Offensive lineman

Personal information
- Born: January 14, 1997 (age 29); Hamilton, Ontario, Canada
- Listed height: 6 ft 4 in (1.93 m)
- Listed weight: 300 lb (136 kg)

Career information
- High school: Sherwood Secondary
- University: Waterloo
- CFL draft: 2019: 1st round, 2nd overall pick

Career history
- Hamilton Tiger-Cats (2019–2022); Edmonton Elks (2022); Montreal Alouettes (2023–2025)

Awards and highlights
- Grey Cup champion (2023)
- Stats at CFL.ca

Jesse Gibbon (born January 14, 1997) is a Canadian professional football offensive lineman.

== University career ==
Gibbon played U Sports football for the Waterloo Warriors, where he appeared in 32 regular season games at left tackle over the course of four seasons.

== Professional career ==
Pre-draft measurables
Height	Weight	40-yard dash	20-yard shuttle	Three-cone drill	Vertical jump	Broad jump	Bench press
6 ft 3 7/8 in (1.93 m)	295 lb (134 kg)	5.18 s	4.75 s	7.85 s	26.0 in (0.66 m)	9 ft 1 1/2 in (2.78 m)	26 reps
All values from CFL Combine

=== Hamilton Tiger-Cats ===
Gibbon was selected second overall in the 2019 CFL draft by the Hamilton Tiger-Cats. He also participated in a mini camp with the Pittsburgh Steelers of the National Football League. He played in 42 regular season games over three seasons for the Tiger-Cats as well as two Grey Cup games.

=== Edmonton Elks ===
On September 2, 2022, Gibbon was traded to the Edmonton Elks for David Beard and an exchange of 2023 CFL draft picks.

=== Montreal Alouettes ===
On February 15, 2023, it was announced that Gibbon had been traded to the Montreal Alouettes for a second-round pick in the 2024 CFL draft. He dressed in 17 games during the 2023 regular season as a backup offensive lineman.

On May 4, 2026, Gibbon was released by the Alouettes.
