= David Ungerer =

American gridiron football player (born 1995)

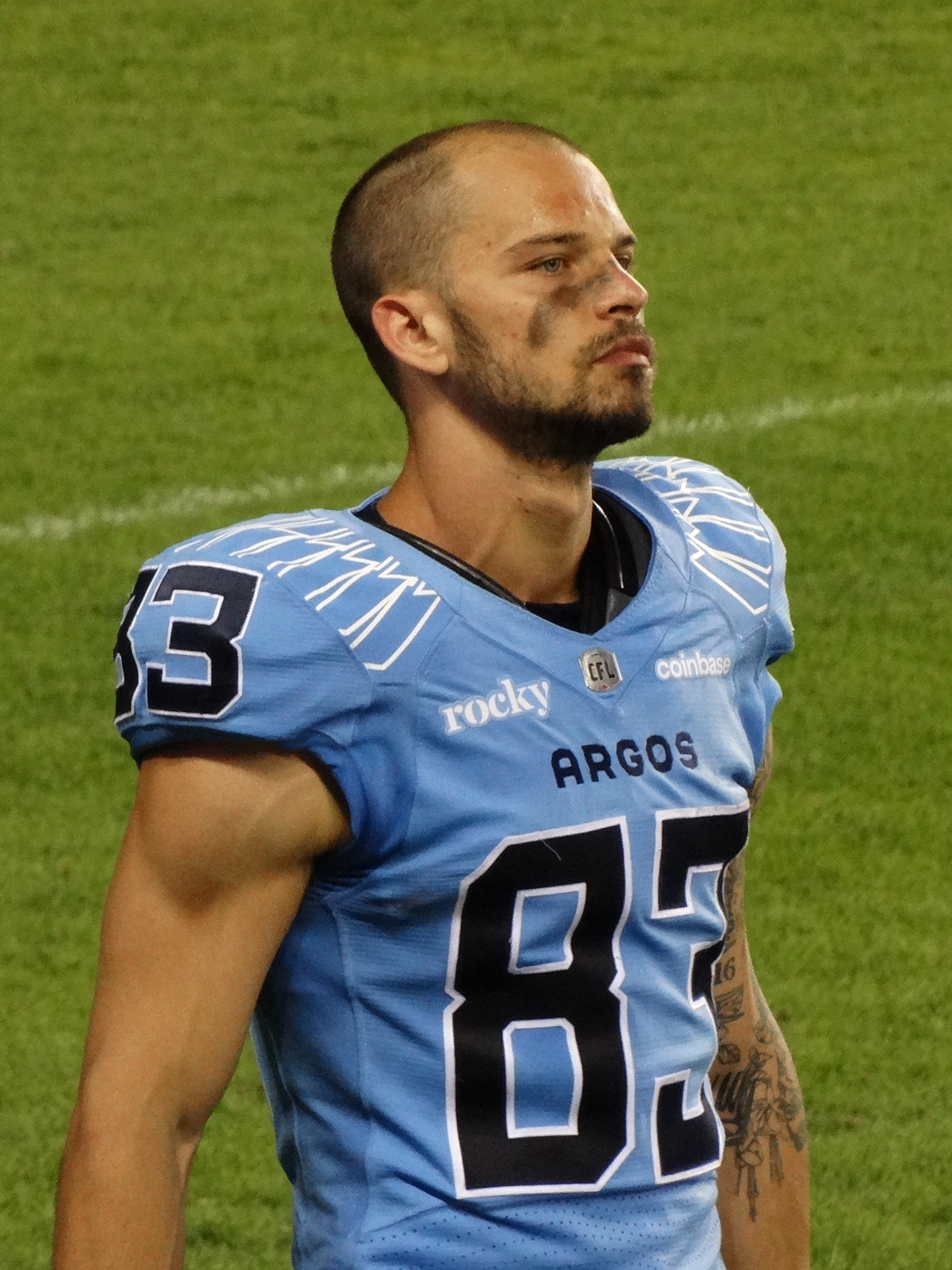
- Ungerer with the Toronto Argonauts in 2025

No. 83 – Toronto Argonauts
- Position: Wide receiver
- Roster status: Active
- CFL status: National

Personal information
- Born: September 16, 1995 (age 31); Pullman, Washington, U.S.
- Listed height: 5 ft 9 in (1.75 m)
- Listed weight: 171 lb (78 kg)

Career information
- High school: Pullman High
- College: Idaho
- CFL draft: 2019: 2nd round, 11th overall pick

Career history
- 2019–2022: Hamilton Tiger-Cats
- 2023–present: Toronto Argonauts

Awards and highlights
- Grey Cup champion (2024); CFL East All-Star (2026)
- Stats at CFL.ca

David Ungerer III (born September 16, 1995) is an American-Canadian professional football wide receiver for the Toronto Argonauts of the Canadian Football League (CFL). He is a Grey Cup champion after winning with Argonauts in 2024. He played college football at Idaho.

== College career ==
Ungerer played college football with the Idaho Vandals from 2014 to 2018.

== Professional career ==
Pre-draft measurables
Height	Weight	Arm length	Hand span	Wingspan	40-yard dash	10-yard split	20-yard split	20-yard shuttle	Three-cone drill	Vertical jump	Broad jump	Bench press
5 ft 9 in (1.75 m)	181 lb (82 kg)	27 5/8 in (0.70 m)	9 1/2 in (0.24 m)	5 ft 8 1/4 in (1.73 m)	4.70 s	1.64 s	2.72 s	4.25 s	7.00 s	35.5 in (0.90 m)	9 ft 9 in (2.97 m)	14 reps
All values from Pro Day

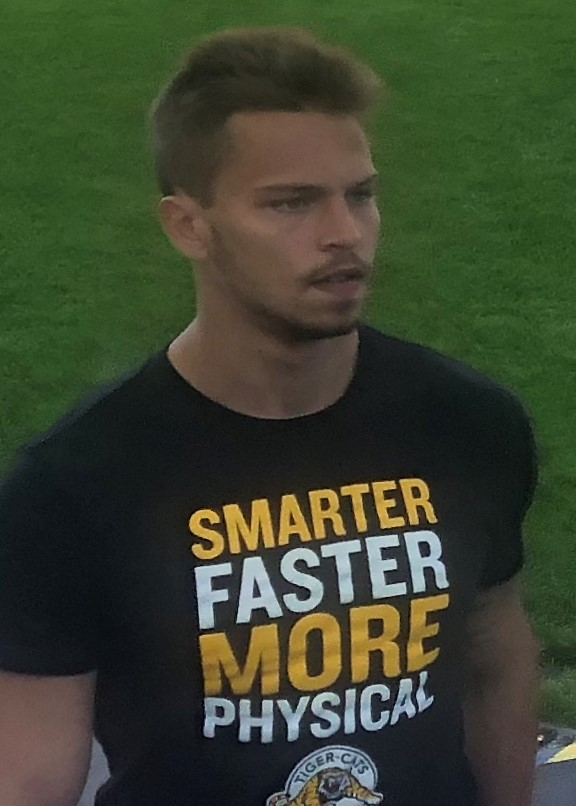
Ungerer with the Hamilton Tiger-Cats in 2019

=== Hamilton Tiger-Cats ===
Ungerer was drafted in the second round, 11th overall by the Hamilton Tiger-Cats in the 2019 CFL draft and he signed with the team on May 17, 2019. He played in his first career CFL game on August 10, 2019 against the BC Lions. He then recorded his first reception the next week on August 17, 2019 against the Ottawa Redblacks. For the season, he played in 10 regular season games as a rookie where he had two catches for 44 yards. He spent the post-season on the injured list and did not play in the Tiger-Cats' 107th Grey Cup loss.

Due to the cancellation of the 2020 CFL season, Ungerer did not play in 2020. He became a regular starter with the Tiger-Cats in 2021 and scored his first career touchdown on a 23-yard catch from Dane Evans in the Labour Day Classic against the Toronto Argonauts on September 6, 2021. For the season, he played in 14 regular season games, starting in 12, where he had 15 receptions for 227 yards and one touchdown along with ten punt returns for 85 yards. He also played in all three post-season games in 2021, including the 108th Grey Cup, where he had three kickoff returns for 42 yards in the loss to the Winnipeg Blue Bombers.

In 2022, Ungerer played in 14 regular season games with seven starts where he had 16 catches for 225 yards and one touchdown. He became a free agent upon the expiry of his contract on February 14, 2023.

=== Toronto Argonauts ===
On March 9, 2023, it was announced that Ungerer had signed with the Toronto Argonauts. He played in all 18 regular season games in 2023, starting seven, where he had a career-high 41 catches for 579 yards and three touchdowns. He also played in the team's East Final loss to the Montreal Alouettes where he had four catches for 35 yards.

In the 2024 season, Ungerer began the season on the six-game injured list, but played and started in the remaining 12 regular season games where he had 32 receptions for 425 yards and one touchdown. He also played and started in all three post-season games, including the 111th Grey Cup where he had four receptions for 29 yards in the Argonauts' 41–24 victory over the Winnipeg Blue Bombers.
