= Nick Statz =

Canadian gridiron football player (born 1996)

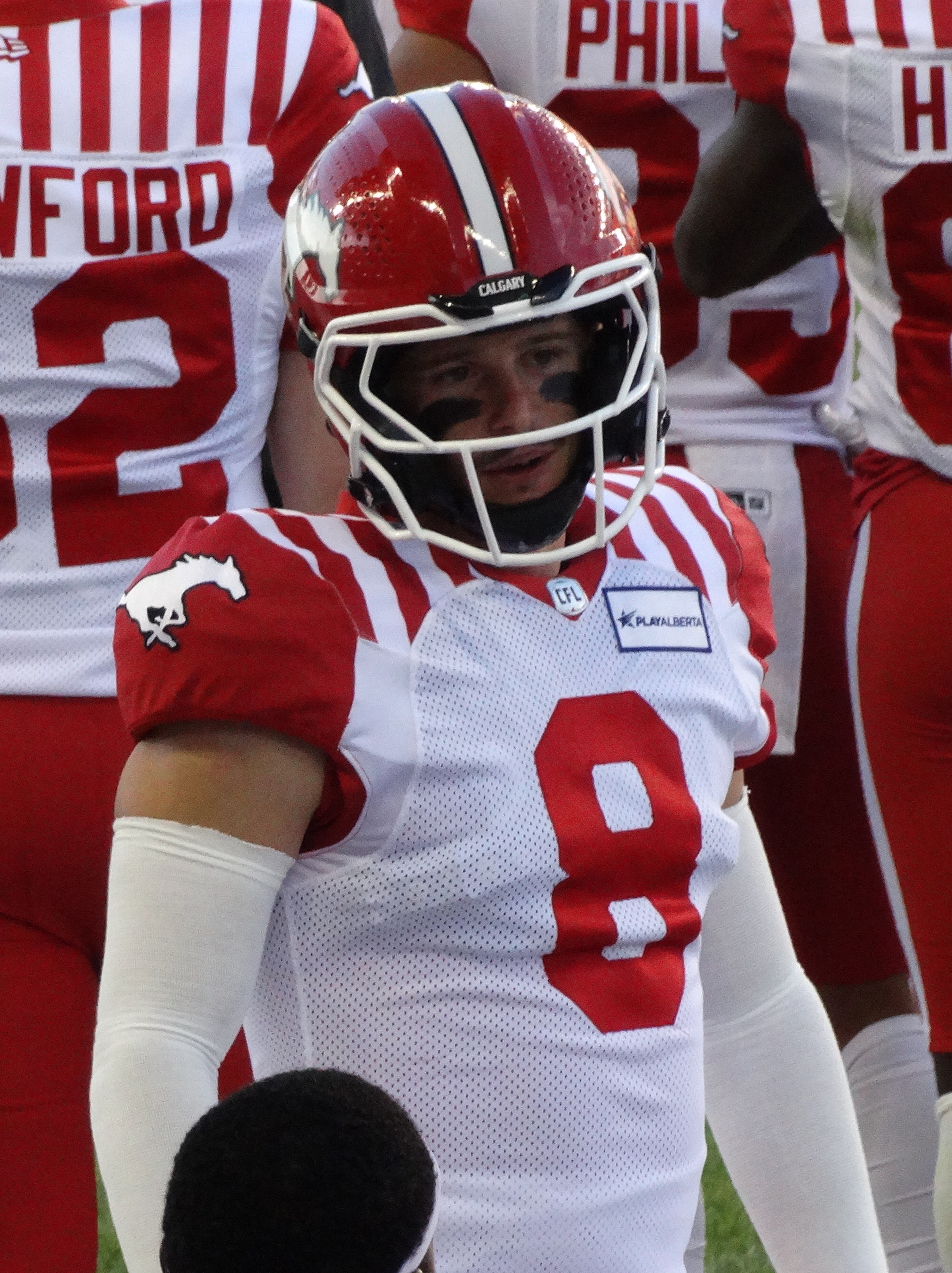
- Statz with the Calgary Stampeders in 2024

Profile
- Position: Defensive back

Personal information
- Born: May 9, 1996 (age 30); Calgary, Alberta, Canada
- Listed height: 5 ft 10 in (1.78 m)
- Listed weight: 190 lb (86 kg)

Career information
- High school: Notre Dame High (AB)
- University: Calgary
- CFL draft: 2019: 6th round, 55th overall pick

Career history
- 2019: Calgary Stampeders*
- 2020–2024: Calgary Stampeders
- * Offseason or practice squad member only

Awards and highlights
- Vanier Cup champion (2019)
- Stats at CFL.ca

Nick Statz (born May 9, 1996) is a Canadian professional football defensive back. He previously played for the Calgary Stampeders of the Canadian Football League (CFL). He played U Sports football at the University of Calgary.

== University career ==
After using a redshirt season in 2014, Statz played U Sports football for the Calgary Dinos from 2015 to 2019. He played in 43 regular season games where he had 125 tackles and eight interceptions. After being drafted by the Calgary Stampeders, he returned to the Dinos for his final season of eligibility in 2019 where he finished his career as a Vanier Cup champion following the team's victory over the Montreal Carabins in the 2019 championship game.

== Professional career ==
Statz was drafted in the sixth round, 55th overall, by the Calgary Stampeders in the 2019 CFL draft and signed with the team on May 13, 2019. He played in both pre-season games in 2019, but returned to school to play for the Dinos that year. He re-signed with the Stampeders on December 4, 2019. However, he did not play in 2020 due to the cancellation of the 2020 CFL season.

In 2021, Statz made the team's active roster following training camp and made his professional debut on August 7, 2021, against the Toronto Argonauts where he had one special teams tackle. He played in the first 12 games of the regular season before suffering a shoulder injury against the Ottawa Redblacks on October 29, 2021, and finished the year on the injured list. To begin the 2022 season, Statz was on the injured list and then the practice roster before dressing in the week 3 game against the Edmonton Elks. He recorded his first career interception on August 13, 2022, after picking off the BC Lions' Nathan Rourke and returning it 16 yards, which led to a Stampeders' touchdown two plays later. He finished his second season in the league having played in 11 games and contributed with 12 special teams tackles, six tackles on defense and one interception. Following the season he agreed to a contract extension with the Stampeders on January 6, 2023.

In 2023, Statz played in 13 regular season games where he recorded five defensive tackles, two special teams tackles, and two interceptions. In the 2024 season, he played in ten games where he had nine defensive tackles, six special teams tackles, and one forced fumble. He became a free agent upon the expiry of his contract on February 11, 2025.

== Personal life ==
Statz has a twin brother, Aaron, who also played as a defensive back for the Calgary Dinos. He went to Notre Dame High School with Colton Hunchak.
