= Jimmy Ralph =

Canadian football player (born 1992)

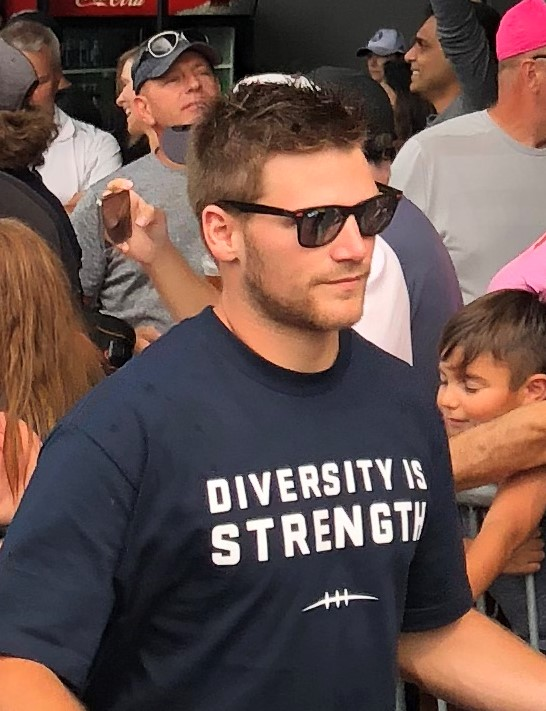
- Ralph before a Toronto Argonauts game in 2018

Profile
- Position: Wide receiver

Personal information
- Born: October 16, 1992 (age 34); Raymond, Alberta, Canada
- Listed height: 5 ft 10 in (1.78 m)
- Listed weight: 185 lb (84 kg)

Career information
- CJFL: Calgary Colts
- College: Weber State Wildcats
- University: Alberta Golden Bears
- CFL draft: 2017: undrafted

Career history
- 2017–2019: Toronto Argonauts
- 2020–2021: Edmonton Eskimos / Football Team / Elks*
- * Offseason or practice squad member only
- Stats at CFL.ca

Jimmy Ralph (born October 16, 1992) is a Canadian former professional football wide receiver. He began his professional career with the Toronto Argonauts in 2017 where he won his first Grey Cup as a member of the 105th Grey Cup championship team.

== Amateur career ==
Ralph played for the Calgary Colts of the Canadian Junior Football League in 2012 before enrolling at Weber State University to play for the Wildcats. He redshirted for the 2013 season and, following a coaching overhaul the following year, elected to transfer to the University of Alberta to play for the Golden Bears for the 2014 season. He was a member of the Golden Bears from 2014 to 2016, but sat out the 2016 season due to injury.

== Professional career ==
=== Toronto Argonauts ===
After not being selected in the 2017 CFL draft, Ralph was signed as an undrafted free agent with the Toronto Argonauts on May 17, 2017. After an impressive showing in the pre-season, Ralph made the team's roster. He dressed in his first game with the Argonauts on June 25, 2017 and had his first career reception in his first career start on July 13, 2017 against the Winnipeg Blue Bombers on a nine-yard pass from Ricky Ray. He recorded 26 receptions for 278 yards in 16 regular season games in 2017. He played in the 105th Grey Cup game and earned his first Grey Cup championship as a member of the Argonauts' winning team.

In his second season with the Argonauts, Ralph began the season as the starting slot receiver due to an injury to teammate Anthony Coombs. After failing to provide much of an impact through the first few games, and the team struggling with the loss of starting quarterback Ricky Ray, the Argonauts coaching staff moved Ralph from the starting lineup into a reserve role, and eventually onto the practice roster. Ralph ended the 2018 season with eight receptions for 70 yards.

In 2019, he earned a spot in the starting lineup following training camp for the first game of the season. He scored his first career CFL touchdown on August 25, 2019 on a six-yard pass from McLeod Bethel-Thompson in Moncton for the Touchdown Atlantic game. He finished the 2019 with a career-high 38 receptions for 355 yards and one touchdown in 18 regular season games. As a pending free agent in 2020, he was released during the free agency negotiation window on February 7, 2020.

=== Edmonton Eskimos / Football Team / Elks ===
As a free agent, Ralph signed with the Edmonton Eskimos on February 13, 2020, but did not play in 2020 due to the cancellation of the 2020 CFL season. He re-signed with the since re-named Edmonton Elks on a contract extension through 2021 on December 26, 2020. He retired from football on June 30, 2021.

== Personal life ==
Ralph was born in Raymond, Alberta, to parents Jim and Shelly Ralph. He has three older brothers who also played football at a high level, at the same position of wide receiver. The eldest brother, Dustin, played college football for the Wyoming Cowboys and Alberta Golden Bears and was Jimmy's head coach in high school. Brock also played for Wyoming before playing professionally for nine years in the Canadian Football League for three teams, winning two Grey Cup championships. Brett played collegiately for Alberta and played for five seasons with the Calgary Stampeders where he was a member of the 96th Grey Cup championship team.
