= Gordon Whyte (Canadian football) =

Canadian gridiron football player (born 1997)

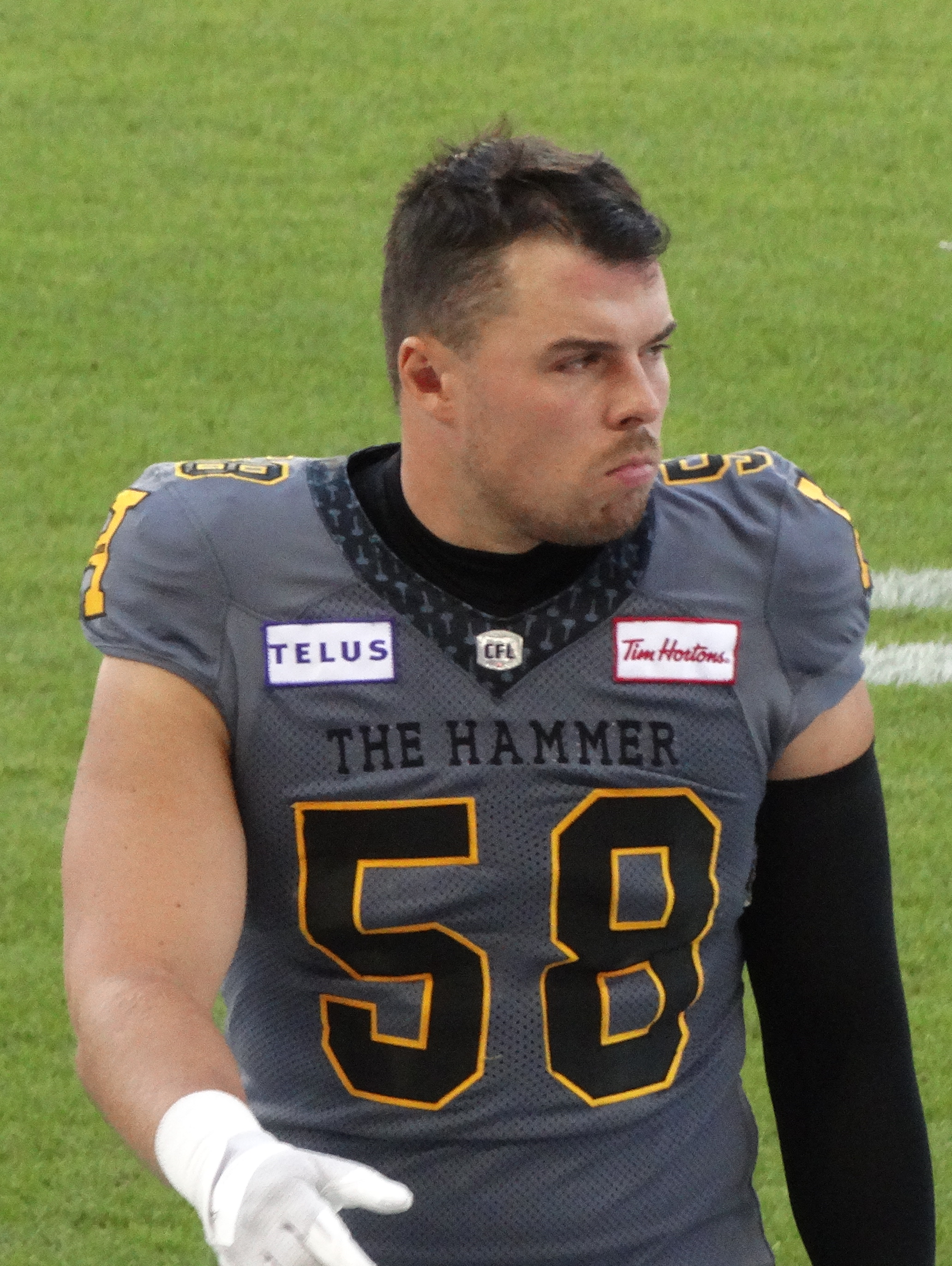
- Whyte with the Hamilton Tiger-Cats in 2024

No. 58 – Hamilton Tiger-Cats
- Position: Long snapper
- Roster status: Active
- CFL status: National

Personal information
- Born: August 21, 1997 (age 29); Toronto, Ontario, Canada
- Listed height: 6 ft 2 in (1.88 m)
- Listed weight: 231 lb (105 kg)

Career information
- University: St. Francis Xavier
- CFL draft: 2019: 8th round, 67th overall pick

Career history
- 2019: Hamilton Tiger-Cats*
- 2020–present: Hamilton Tiger-Cats
- * Offseason or practice squad member only

Awards and highlights
- 3× Loney Bowl champion (2015, 2016, 2018)
- Stats at CFL.ca

Gordon Whyte (born August 21, 1997) is a Canadian professional football long snapper for the Hamilton Tiger-Cats of the Canadian Football League (CFL).

== University career ==
Whyte played U Sports football for the St. Francis Xavier X-Men from 2015 to 2019. He played in 40 games over five seasons with the team where he had 137 tackles, ten tackles for a loss, and one sack. He was a member of three Loney Bowl championship teams as the X-Men won in 2015, 2016, and 2018.

== Professional career ==
Pre-draft measurables
Height	Weight	40-yard dash	20-yard shuttle	Three-cone drill	Vertical jump	Broad jump	Bench press
6 ft 0 7/8 in (1.85 m)	230 lb (104 kg)	5.09 s	4.66 s	7.66 s	30.5 in (0.77 m)	9 ft 0 in (2.74 m)	12 reps
All values from CFL Combine

Whyte was drafted in the eighth round, 67th overall by the Hamilton Tiger-Cats as a linebacker in the 2019 CFL draft and signed with the team on May 17, 2019. He attended training camp in 2019 with the team, but was placed on the suspended list prior to the start of the season so that he could return to school.

Following the end of the 2019 U Sports football season, Whyte re-signed with the Tiger-Cats which was announced on December 18, 2019. However, he did not play in 2020 due to the cancellation of the 2020 CFL season. He made the team's active roster following training camp in 2021 and played in his first career professional game on August 5, 2021, against the Winnipeg Blue Bombers. He played in all 14 games at long snapper where he had four special teams tackles and one fumble recovery. He also played in all three post-season games that year, including his first Grey Cup game in a 108th Grey Cup loss to the Blue Bombers.
