= 2021 Montreal Alouettes season =

Canadian football team season

- General manager: Danny Maciocia
- Head coach: Khari Jones
- Home stadium: Percival Molson Memorial Stadium

Results
- Record: 7–7
- Division place: 3rd, East
- Playoffs: Lost East Semi-Final
- Team MOP: William Stanback
- Team MODP: David Ménard
- Team MOC: David Ménard
- Team MOOL: Landon Rice
- Team MOST: David Côté
- Team MOR: David Côté

Uniform

The 2021 Montreal Alouettes season was the 54th season for the team in the Canadian Football League (CFL) and their 66th overall. The Alouettes qualified for the playoffs on November 5, 2021, after the Hamilton Tiger-Cats defeated the BC Lions in week 14. The team's season was ended by the same Tiger-Cats following a 23–12 East Semi-Final loss in Hamilton.

The 2021 CFL season was the second season for Khari Jones as the Alouettes' head coach and offensive coordinator as he had the "interim" tag removed after he agreed to a three-year extension on November 26, 2019. This was his first full season as the team's head coach. This was also the first season with Danny Maciocia as the team's general manager.

An 18-game season schedule was originally released on November 20, 2020, but it was announced on April 21, 2021 that the start of the season would likely be delayed until August and feature a 14-game schedule. On June 15, 2021, the league released the revised 14-game schedule with regular season play beginning on August 5, 2021.

== Offseason ==
=== CFL global draft ===
The 2021 CFL global draft took place on April 15, 2021. With the format being a snake draft, the Alouettes selected sixth in the odd-numbered rounds and fourth in the even-numbered rounds.

Round	Pick	Player	Position	University/Club Team	Nationality
1	6	Joseph Zema	P	Incarnate Word	Australia
2	13	Akio Yamagishi	LB	Fujitsu Frontiers	Japan
3	24	Taku Lee	RB	Obic Seagulls	Japan
4	31	William James	DB	North Dakota	Sweden

== CFL national draft ==
The 2021 CFL draft took place on May 4, 2021. The Alouettes had five selections in the six-round draft after the team traded their first-round pick to the Hamilton Tiger-Cats in the trade for Johnny Manziel. The team had the ninth pick in odd rounds and the first pick in even rounds.

Round	Pick	Player	Position	University team	Hometown
2	10	Pier-Olivier Lestage	OL	Montreal	Saint-Eustache, QC
3	27	Chris Fournier	OL	Lehigh	Orleans, ON
4	28	Patrick Davis	OL	Syracuse	Gatineau, QC
5	45	David Côté	K	Laval	Quebec City, QC
6	46	Ethan Makonzo	DB	Montreal	Montreal, QC

== Preseason ==
Due to the shortening of the season, the CFL confirmed that pre-season games would not be played in 2021.

=== Planned schedule ===
Week	Game	Date	Kickoff	Opponent	TV	Venue
A	Bye					
B	1	Fri, May 28	7:30 p.m. EDT	vs. Ottawa Redblacks	RDS	Molson Stadium
C	2	Fri, June 4	7:30 p.m. EDT	at Ottawa Redblacks	RDS	TD Place Stadium

== Regular season ==
=== Standings ===
East Division
Team	GP	W	L	T	Pts	PF	PA	Div	Stk	
Toronto Argonauts	14	9	5	0	18	309	318	6–2	L1	Details
Hamilton Tiger-Cats	14	8	6	0	16	312	244	4–4	W1	Details
Montreal Alouettes	14	7	7	0	14	356	295	5–3	L1	Details
Ottawa Redblacks	14	3	11	0	6	224	384	1–7	W1	Details

=== Schedule ===
The Alouettes initially had a schedule that featured 18 regular season games beginning on June 11 and ending on October 30. However, due to the COVID-19 pandemic in Canada, the Canadian Football League delayed the start of the regular season to August 5, 2021 and the Alouettes began their 14-game season on August 14, 2021.

Week	Game	Date	Kickoff	Opponent	Results		TV	Venue	Attendance	Summary
Week	Game	Date	Kickoff	Opponent	Score	Record	TV	Venue	Attendance	Summary
1	Bye									
2	1	Sat, Aug 14	7:00 p.m. EDT	@ Edmonton Elks	W 30–13	1–0	TSN/RDS	Commonwealth Stadium	25,116	Recap
3	2	Fri, Aug 20	9:30 p.m. EDT	@ Calgary Stampeders	L 22–28	1–1	TSN/RDS	McMahon Stadium	21,199	Recap
4	3	Fri, Aug 27	7:30 p.m. EDT	Hamilton Tiger-Cats	L 10–27	1–2	TSN/RDS/ESPNews	Molson Stadium	14,753	Recap
5	4	Fri, Sept 3	7:30 p.m. EDT	@ Ottawa Redblacks	W 51–29	2–2	TSN/RDS	TD Place Stadium	15,000	Recap
6	Bye									
7	5	Sat, Sept 18	7:00 p.m. EDT	BC Lions	L 18–24	2–3	TSN/RDS	Molson Stadium	13,591	Recap
8	6	Fri, Sept 24	7:30 p.m. EDT	@ Toronto Argonauts	L 27–30	2–4	TSN/RDS	BMO Field	7,758	Recap
9	7	Sat, Oct 2	4:00 p.m. EDT	@ Hamilton Tiger-Cats	W 23–20 (OT)	3–4	TSN/RDS	Tim Hortons Field	18,000	Recap
10	8	Mon, Oct 11	1:00 p.m. EDT	Ottawa Redblacks	W 20–16	4–4	TSN/RDS	Molson Stadium	15,236	Recap
11	9	Sat, Oct 16	4:00 p.m. EDT	@ Ottawa Redblacks	W 27–16	5–4	TSN/RDS	TD Place Stadium	16,139	Recap
12	10	Fri, Oct 22	7:30 p.m. EDT	Toronto Argonauts	W 37–16	6–4	TSN/RDS	Molson Stadium	12,142	Recap
13	11	Sat, Oct 30	7:00 p.m. EDT	Saskatchewan Roughriders	L 14–19	6–5	TSN/RDS	Molson Stadium	11,817	Recap
14	12	Sat, Nov 6	7:00 p.m. EDT	@ Winnipeg Blue Bombers	L 21–31	6–6	TSN/RDS	IG Field	22,933	Recap
15	13	Sat, Nov 13	1:00 p.m. EDT	Winnipeg Blue Bombers	W 28–14	7–6	TSN/RDS	Molson Stadium	12,605	Recap
16	14	Fri, Nov 19	7:30 p.m. EDT	Ottawa Redblacks	L 18–19	7–7	TSN/RDS	Molson Stadium	11,297	Recap

# Games played with white uniforms.
# Games played with blue uniforms.

== Post-season ==
=== Schedule ===
Game	Date	Kickoff	Opponent	Results		TV	Venue	Attendance	Summary
Game	Date	Kickoff	Opponent	Score	Record	TV	Venue	Attendance	Summary
East Semi-Final	Sun, Nov 28	1:00 p.m. EST	@ Hamilton Tiger-Cats	L 12–23	0–1	TSN/RDS/ESPN2	Tim Hortons Field	21,892	Recap

# Games played with white uniforms.

== Roster ==
2021 Montreal Alouettes final roster
**Quarterbacks**: 17 Trevor Harris; 14 Shea Patterson; **Running backs**: 20 Jeshrun Antwi; 26 Cameron Artis-Payne; 80 Spencer Moore; 38 Christophe Normand; 31 William Stanback; **Receivers**: 4 Quan Bray; 83 Régis Cibasu; 11 Kaion Julien-Grant; 87 Geno Lewis; 81 Rashaun Simonise; 84 Reggie White Jr.; 9 Jake Wieneke	**Offensive linemen**: 66 David Brown C/T; 68 David Foucault G; 50 Mathieu Girard C; 64 Sean Jamieson C; 51 Kristian Matte G/C; 55 Landon Rice T/G; 67 Tony Washington T; **Defensive linemen**: 97 Woody Baron DT; 99 Jamal Davis DE; 94 Cameron Lawson DT; 52 David Ménard DT/DE; 90 Almondo Sewell DT; 10 Nick Usher DE; 96 Michael Wakefield DT/DE	**Linebackers**: 21 Chris Ackie; 0 Brian Harelimana; 40 Paul Kozachuk; 43 Ahmad Thomas; 33 Tre Watson; **Defensive backs**: 30 Ty Cranston; 24 Marc-Antoine Dequoy; 41 Kerfalla Exumé; 1 Money Hunter; 3 Patrick Levels; 12 Najee Murray; 6 Adarius Pickett; 32 Rodney Randle; 5 Greg Reid	**Special teams**: 15 David Côté K; 34 Alexandre Gagné LS; 36 Joseph Zema P; **Practice roster**: 69 Kwabena Asare G; 82 Manasseh Bailey WR; 62 Nick Callender T; 45 Reshard Cliett LB; 12 Quinten Dormady QB; 95 Chris Favoroso DE; 00 Jermaine Gabriel DB; 89 Fabian Guerra WR; 88 Kevin Kaya WR; 91 Anthony Luke DE; 59 Junior Luke DT; 46 Matt Mengel K/P; 61 Taylor Tappin T; 65 Samuel Thomassin G; 49 Akio Yamagishi LB	**Injured list**: 19 Dante Absher WR; 8 Vernon Adams QB; 2 Mario Alford WR; 42 Jean-Samuel Blanc DE; 35 Pierre-Luc Caron LS; 25 Ryan Carter DB; 85 B. J. Cunningham SB; 60 Patrick Davis C/G; 53 Philippe Gagnon G; 22 Tyquwan Glass DB; 23 Martese Jackson RB; 29 Taku Lee RB; 44 Frédéric Plesius LB; 54 Chris Schleuger T; 18 Matt Shiltz QB; 37 Wes Sutton DB; **Suspended list**: 41 Jason Hall LB; 61 Donald Hawkins T; -- Prince Charles Iworah DB; 47 D. J. Lalama LB; 23 Dominique Termansen DB
Italics indicate American player • **Bold** indicates Global player

== Coaching staff ==
Montreal Alouettes staff
Front office: Owner – S and S Sportsco (Sid Spiegel and Gary Stern); President/CEO – Mario Cecchini; General manager – Danny Maciocia; Senior player personnel executive – Brendan Taman; Director of player personnel – Byron Archambault; Director of football operations – Éric Deslauriers; Head video coordinator – Rico Morotti; Head coach: Head coach – Khari Jones; Assistant head coach – André Bolduc; Offensive coaches: Offensive Coordinator & Quarterbacks – Khari Jones; Offensive line – Luc Brodeur-Jourdain; Receivers – Robert Gordon; Running backs – André Bolduc; Offensive assistant – Michael Lionello	Defensive coaches: Defensive Coordinator & Defensive Backs – Barron Miles; Linebackers – Mickey Donovan; Defensive line – Greg Quick; Special teams coaches: Special teams coordinator – Mickey Donovan; Staff: Equipment manager – Greg McGuire; Assistant equipment manager – Ryan Batten; Head athletic therapist – Rodney Sassi; → Coaching staff
