= Régis Cibasu =

Canadian gridiron football player (born 1994)

- Cibasu with the Montreal Alouettes in 2026

No. 3 – Montreal Alouettes
- Position: Wide receiver
- Roster status: Active
- CFL status: National

Personal information
- Born: September 13, 1994 (age 32); Kinshasa, Zaire
- Listed height: 6 ft 3 in (1.91 m)
- Listed weight: 240 lb (109 kg)

Career information
- University: Montreal
- CFL draft: 2018: 3rd round, 20th overall pick

Career history
- Toronto Argonauts (2019–2020); Montreal Alouettes (2021–present)

Awards and highlights
- Grey Cup champion (2023); Vanier Cup champion (2014); Vanier Cup MVP (2014)
- Stats at CFL.ca

Régis Cibasu (born September 13, 1994) is a Congolese-Canadian professional football wide receiver for the Montreal Alouettes of the Canadian Football League (CFL).

== University career ==
Cibasu played U Sports football with the Montreal Carabins, originally joining the team in 2014 and playing wide receiver. He quickly established himself as a dominant force as he was named an RSEQ First Team All-Star and the RSEQ Rookie of the Year in 2014. He finished his stellar year with a Vanier Cup Most Valuable Player award after recording six receptions for 90 yards in a Carabins victory in the 50th Vanier Cup game in Montreal. He continued to have success over his five-year university career with the Carabins and finished as the program's all-time leading receiver with 183 receptions for 2,231 receiving yards and nine touchdowns in 38 career games.

== Professional career ==
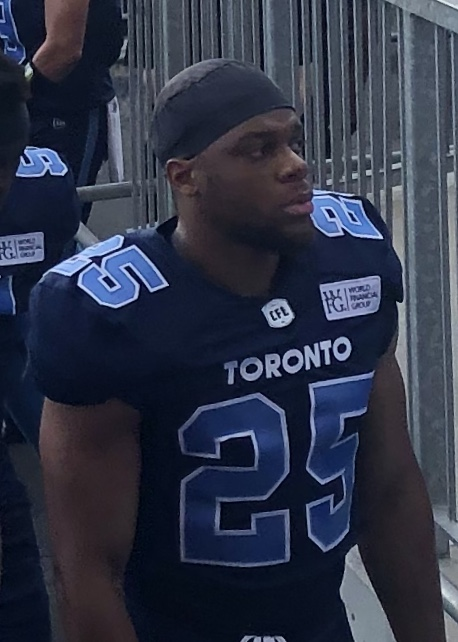
Cibasu with the Toronto Argonauts in 2019

=== Toronto Argonauts ===
Cibasu was drafted in the third round, 20th overall, by the Toronto Argonauts in the 2018 CFL draft as a wide receiver. However, he elected to return to university to complete his fifth and final year of eligibility. He was then signed on the 2019 CFL draft day on May 2, 2019.

Upon making the active roster following 2019 training camp, he dressed in his first professional game on June 22, 2019, against the Hamilton Tiger-Cats as a back-up receiver. Following an injury to the team's starting fullback, Declan Cross, Cibasu switched positions to fullback and started his first professional game on July 6, 2019, against the BC Lions. For the 2019 season, he played in 16 regular season games and recorded three special teams tackles. He did not play in 2020 due to the cancellation of the 2020 CFL season and, as a pending free agent in 2021, he was released early by the Argonauts on February 8, 2021.

=== Montreal Alouettes ===
On February 9, 2021, it was announced that Cibasu had signed with the Montreal Alouettes. He played in 13 regular season games in 2021 where he had five special teams tackles. After changing positions back to wide receiver in 2022, he made his first career reception on June 16, 2022, against his former team, the Argonauts. He played in 17 regular season games where he had two receptions for eight yards and four special teams tackles.

== Personal life ==
Cibasu was born in Kinshasa, Zaire (now the Democratic Republic of the Congo), but moved to southwest Montreal with his parents when he was three years old.
