= Kaion Julien-Grant =

Canadian gridiron football player (born 1996)

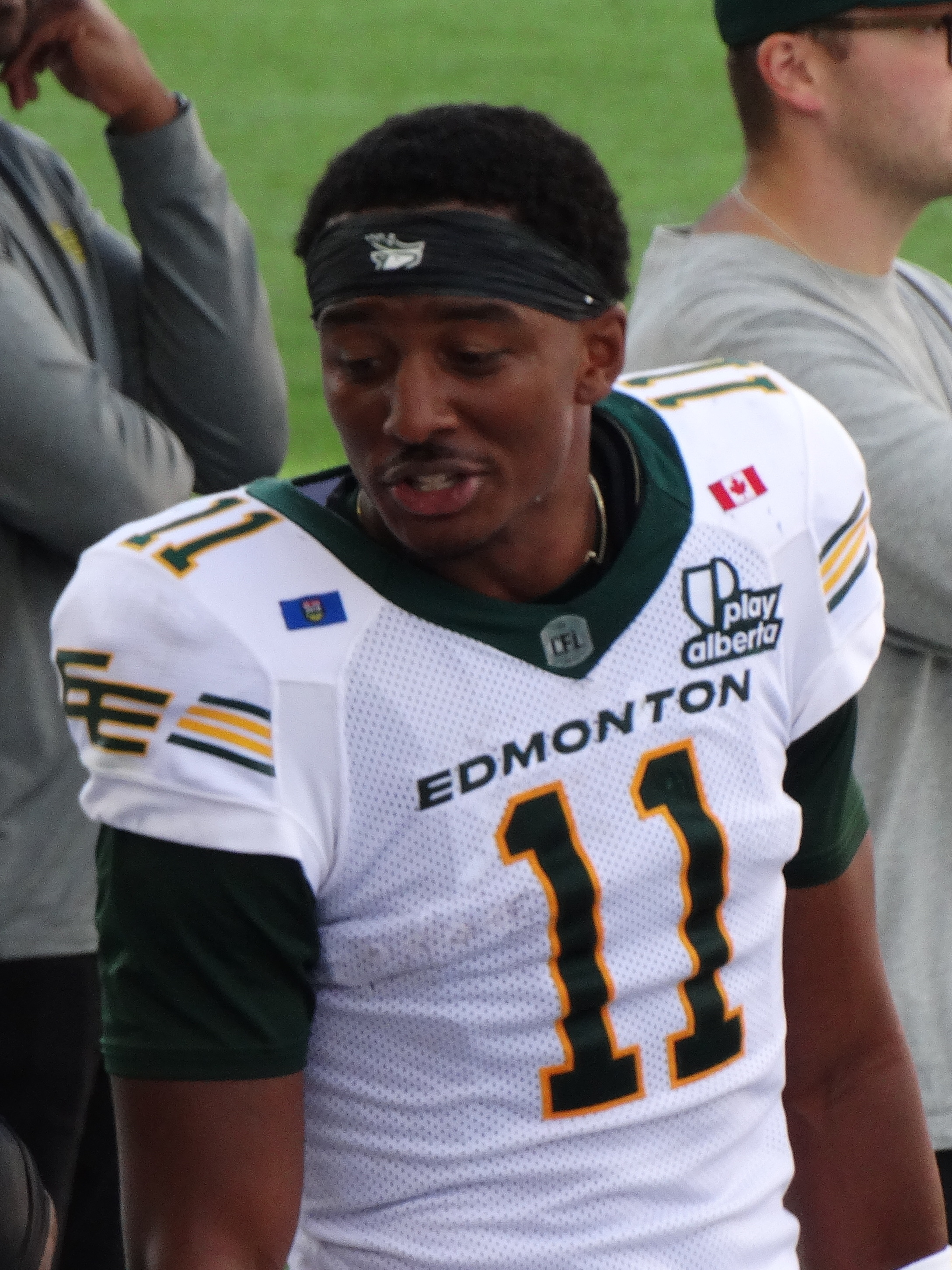
- Julien-Grant with the Edmonton Elks in 2025

No. 11 – Edmonton Elks
- Position: Wide receiver
- Roster status: Active
- CFL status: National

Personal information
- Born: July 6, 1996 (age 30); Toronto, Ontario, Canada
- Listed height: 6 ft 0 in (1.83 m)
- Listed weight: 210 lb (95 kg)

Career information
- University: St. Francis Xavier
- CFL draft: 2019: 2nd round, 13th overall pick

Career history
- 2019–2024: Montreal Alouettes
- 2025–present: Edmonton Elks

Awards and highlights
- 2× Grey Cup champion (2023, 2026)
- Stats at CFL.ca

Kaion Julien-Grant (born July 6, 1996) is a Canadian professional football wide receiver for the Edmonton Elks of the Canadian Football League (CFL). He played U Sports football for the St. Francis Xavier X-Men.

== University career ==
In high school, Julien-Grant was a dual-sport athlete, playing both football and basketball. He committed to play college football at St. Francis Xavier. Over 31 career games with the X-Men, Julien-Grant had 118 receptions for 2,032 yards and 22 touchdowns, adding 672 yards on 31 kickoff returns and 1,786 yards and two touchdowns on 119 punt returns.

== Professional career ==
Pre-draft measurables
Height	Weight	40-yard dash	20-yard shuttle	Three-cone drill	Vertical jump	Broad jump	Bench press
6 ft 1 in (1.85 m)	210 lb (95 kg)	4.49 s	4.47 s	7.43 s	37.5 in (0.95 m)	10 ft 7 1/4 in (3.23 m)	7 reps
All values from CFL Combine

=== Montreal Alouettes ===
Julien-Grant was selected 13th overall by the Montreal Alouettes in the 2019 CFL draft. He began the 2019 season on the injured list, but then dressed for his first professional regular season game on August 25, 2021, against the Toronto Argonauts. He had his first career reception on November 1, 2021, against the Ottawa Redblacks and the eight-yard catch was his lone stat of the season while playing in eight regular season games. Julien-Grant played in his first post-season game this season, but the Alouettes lost the East Semi-Final to the Edmonton Eskimos.

Due to the cancellation of the 2020 CFL season, Julien-Grant did not play in 2020. He re-signed with the Alouettes on January 20, 2021. He played in all 14 regular season games during the 2021 season where he had eight receptions for 133 yards.

On June 23, 2022, Julien-Grant scored his first career professional touchdown on a 70-yard reception from Trevor Harris in a game against the Saskatchewan Roughriders. He finished the season having played in all 18 regular season games where he had 36 receptions for 517 yards and three touchdowns. He also had six catches for 46 yards in the two playoff games that year. Following the season Julien-Grant had a workout with the Denver Broncos of the National Football League (NFL).

=== Edmonton Elks ===
Julien-Grant joined the Edmonton Elks through free agency on February 11, 2025.

== Personal life ==
Julien-Grant's father, Karim Grant, played in the CFL for the Alouettes and the Hamilton Tiger-Cats.
