= Hergy Mayala =

Canadian gridiron football player (born 1995)

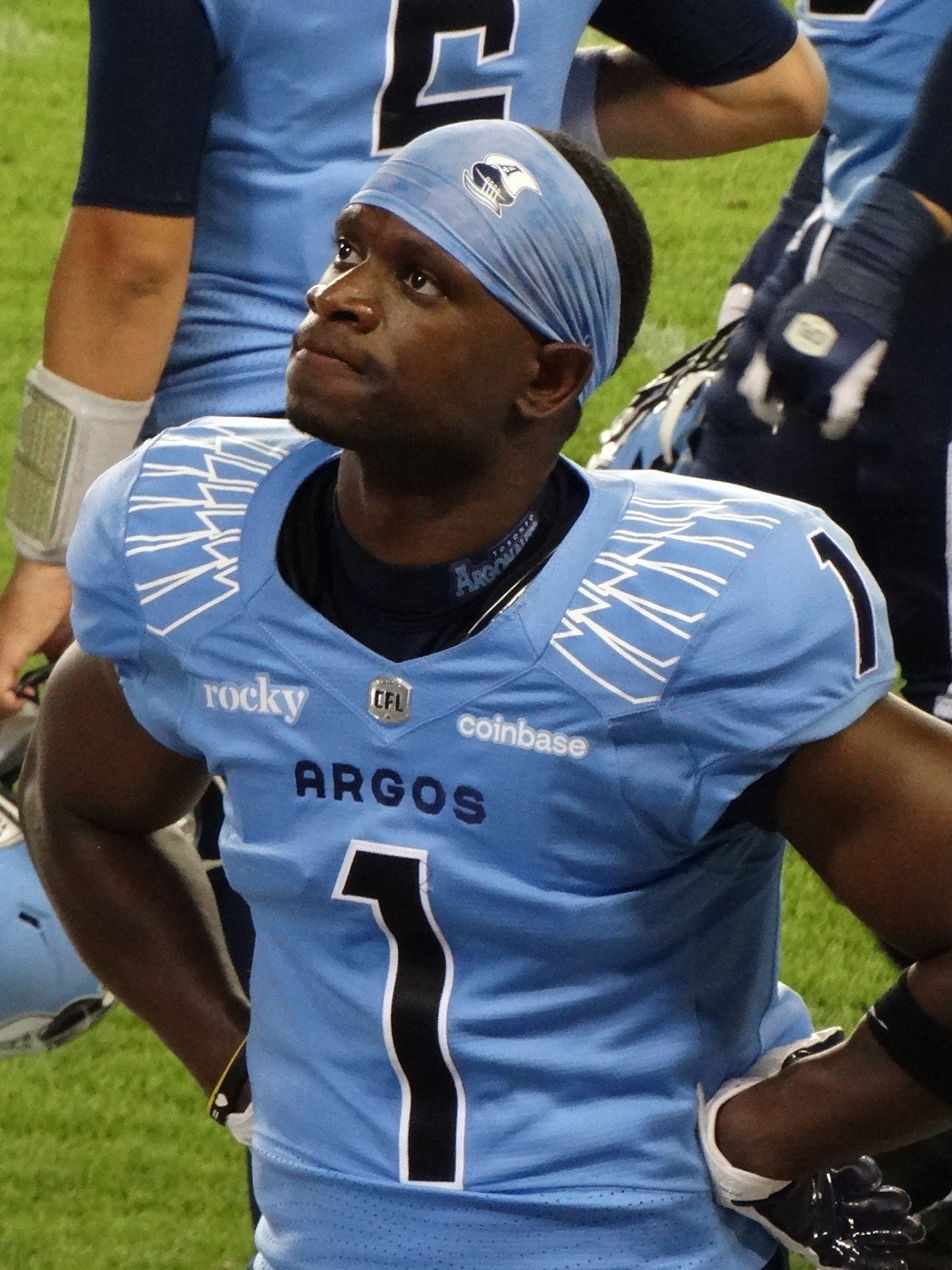
- Mayala with the Toronto Argonauts in 2025

No. 88 – BC Lions
- Position: Wide receiver
- Roster status: Active
- CFL status: National

Personal information
- Born: October 21, 1995 (age 31); Montreal, Quebec, Canada
- Listed height: 6 ft 0 in (1.83 m)
- Listed weight: 208 lb (94 kg)

Career information
- High school: Trinity-Pawling School
- College: Connecticut (2015–2018)
- CFL draft: 2019: 1st round, 8th overall pick

Career history
- 2019–2021: Calgary Stampeders
- 2022: Montreal Alouettes
- 2023: New Orleans Breakers*
- 2023: Montreal Alouettes
- 2023: Hamilton Tiger-Cats
- 2024: Edmonton Elks
- 2025: Toronto Argonauts
- 2025–present: BC Lions
- * Offseason or practice squad member only
- Stats at CFL.ca

Hergy Mayala (born October 21, 1995) is a Canadian professional football wide receiver for the BC Lions of the Canadian Football League (CFL).

== College career ==
Mayala played college football at Connecticut. He started in all regular season games as a junior and senior at Connecticut, and across his college career he totaled 113 receptions for 1,352 yards and 12 touchdowns. His 113 receptions place him sixth all-time at Connecticut since Connecticut moved from the FCS to the FBS.

== Professional career ==
Pre-draft measurables
Height	Weight	Arm length	Hand span	40-yard dash	20-yard shuttle	Three-cone drill	Vertical jump	Broad jump	Bench press
6 ft 1 3/8 in (1.86 m)	206 lb (93 kg)	31 5/8 in (0.80 m)	10 in (0.25 m)	4.67 s	4.29 s	7.14 s	30.0 in (0.76 m)	9 ft 8 in (2.95 m)	15 reps
All values from Pro Day

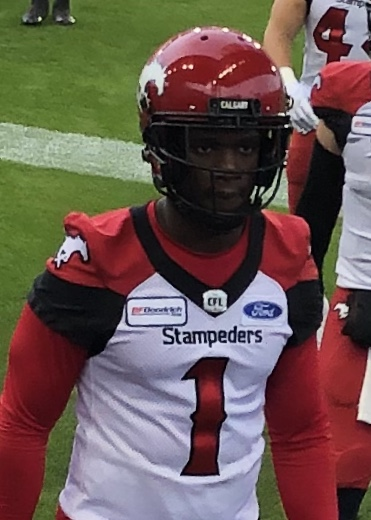
Mayala with the Calgary Stampeders in 2019

=== Calgary Stampeders ===
Mayala was selected in the first round, eighth overall, by the Calgary Stampeders in the 2019 CFL draft. He played in his first professional game on June 15, 2019 against the Ottawa Redblacks. He scored his first professional touchdown on an eight-yard reception from Bo Levi Mitchell against the Saskatchewan Roughriders on October 11, 2019. He played in 16 regular season games in 2019 where he had 38 receptions for 562 yards and five touchdowns. He did not play in 2020 due to the cancellation of the 2020 CFL season. In 2021, he played in 13 out of 14 regular season games where he recorded 29 catches for 284 yards, but no touchdowns. He became a free agent upon the expiry of his contract on February 8, 2022.

=== Montreal Alouettes (first stint) ===
On February 8, 2022, it was announced that Mayala had signed with his hometown team, the Montreal Alouettes. On February 14, 2023, his contract expired and he became a free agent.

=== New Orleans Breakers ===
On February 15, 2023, Mayala signed with the New Orleans Breakers of the United States Football League (USFL). He was transferred to the team's inactive list on March 19, 2023, and activated from the suspended list on March 26. He was released on April 10.

=== Montreal Alouettes (second stint) ===
Mayala re-signed with the Alouettes on May 4, 2023. He played in ten games where he recorded seven catches for 115 yards before being released on August 29, 2023.

=== Hamilton Tiger-Cats ===
On October 6, 2023, it was announced that Mayala had signed with the Hamilton Tiger-Cats. He played in two regular season games and one playoff game, but did not record any statistics.

=== Edmonton Elks ===
Mayala joined the Edmonton Elks in free agency on April 9, 2024. He played in 12 regular season games where he recorded a career-high 41 receptions for 503 yards and five touchdowns. He became a free agent upon the expiry of his contract on February 11, 2025.

=== Toronto Argonauts ===
On February 11, 2025, it was announced that Mayala had signed with the Toronto Argonauts. He played in seven games, recording three catches for 40 yards, before being released on August 7, 2025.

=== BC Lions ===
On August 11, 2025, Mayala signed with the BC Lions and joined their practice roster for the remainder of the 2025 season, until his contract expired on November 9, 2025.

On January 30, 2026, Mayala re-signed with the Lions for the 2026 season. On May 31, 2026, Mayala was released by Lions, during their final cuts before the start of the 2026 CFL season.

On June 22, 2026, Mayala again re-signed with the Lions and rejoined their practice roster. On June 26, 2026, Mayala was promoted to the Lions' active roster. He was reassigned to the practice roster on August 7, 2026. On November 6, 2026, Mayala was again promoted to the Lions' active roster ahead of the West Final.
