= Shane Richards =

Canadian gridiron football player (born 1995)

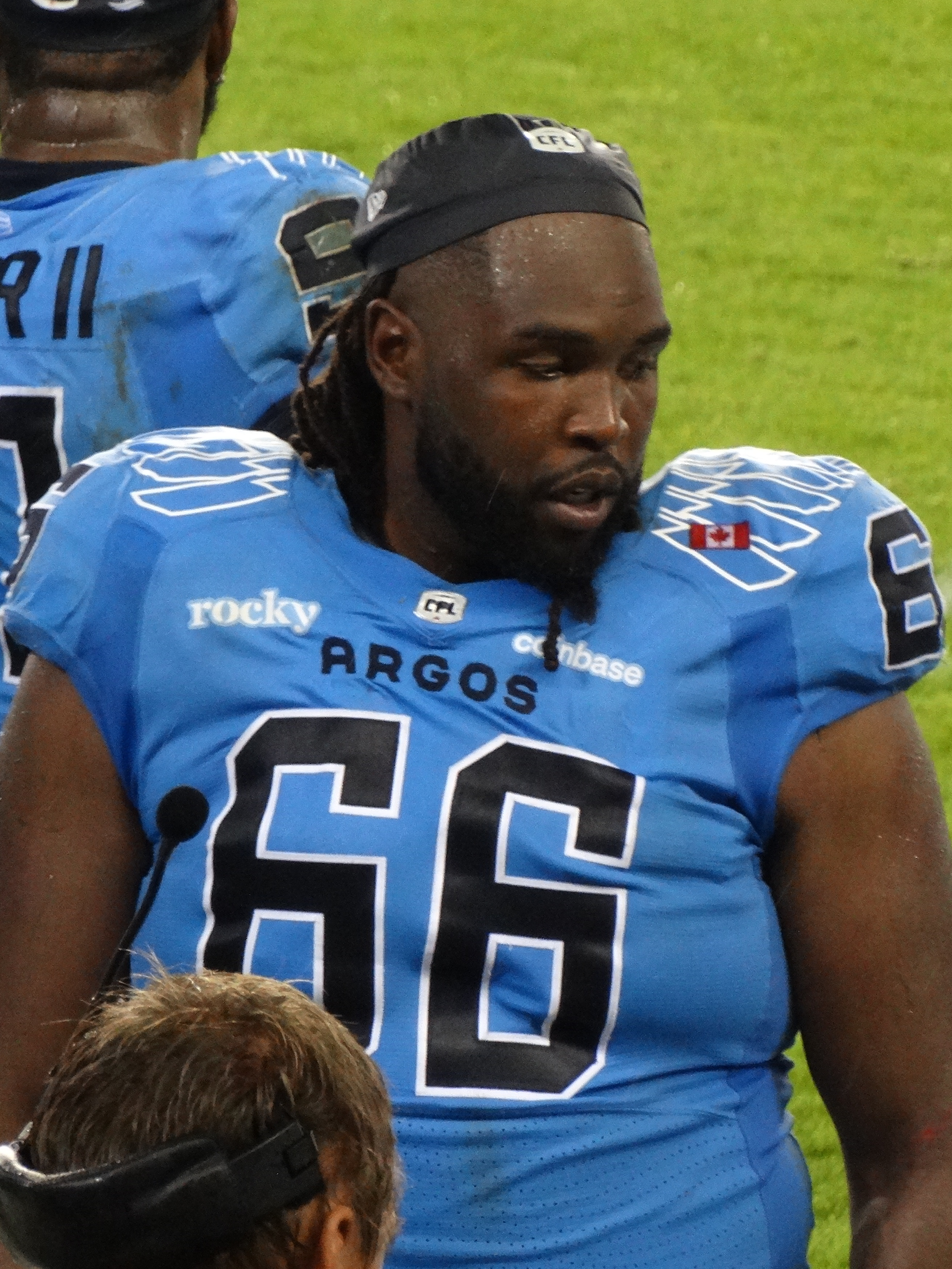
- Richards with the Toronto Argonauts in 2025

Profile
- Position: Offensive lineman

Personal information
- Born: June 4, 1995 (age 31); Kingston, Jamaica
- Listed height: 6 ft 8 in (2.03 m)
- Listed weight: 325 lb (147 kg)

Career information
- High school: Crescent Heights
- CJFL: Calgary Colts
- College: Oklahoma State; New Mexico Military
- CFL draft: 2019: 1st round, 1st overall pick

Career history
- 2019–2023: Toronto Argonauts
- 2024: Edmonton Elks
- 2025: Toronto Argonauts

Awards and highlights
- Grey Cup champion (2022)
- Stats at CFL.ca

Shane Richards (born June 4, 1995) is a Jamaican-Canadian professional football offensive lineman. He most recently played for the Toronto Argonauts of the Canadian Football League (CFL).

== Early life ==
Richards was born in Kingston, Jamaica to Daniel and Opel Richards and moved to Calgary as a child where he grew up and attended Crescent Heights High School.

== Amateur career ==
Following high school, Richards played for the Calgary Colts of the Canadian Junior Football League in the 2014 season and practiced with the Calgary Stampeders as a territorial rights player that same year. He then attended New Mexico Military Institute to play college football for the Broncos in 2015. After seeing success there, he transferred to play for the Oklahoma State Cowboys in 2016 where he played in four games as a junior. He had a redshirt season in 2017 and returned to play his senior year in 2018 where he played in eight regular season games and in the Liberty Bowl victory over Missouri.

== Professional career ==
=== Toronto Argonauts (first stint) ===
Upon entering the CFL draft, Richards was ranked as the second-best prospect by the Central CFL Scouting Bureau for players eligible in the 2019 CFL draft. He was eventually drafted first overall in the draft by the Toronto Argonauts and signed with the team at a team draft party with season ticket holders on May 2, 2019, to a three-year contract. Richards was an opening day starter for the team in the 2019 season and played in his first professional game on June 22, 2019, against the Hamilton Tiger-Cats. He suffered a groin injury in practice before the second game of the season and was on the injured reserve for the next ten games. Richards dressed in the last seven games of the season and played eight in total for his rookie year. He did not play in 2020 due to the cancellation of the 2020 CFL season.

In 2021, Richards dressed in all 14 regular season games and started in eight. He also dressed in his first post-season game, but the Argonauts lost to the Tiger-Cats in the East Final. In the 2022 season, he played in 16 regular season games and started in two. He also played in both post-season games, including the 109th Grey Cup where the Argonauts defeated the Winnipeg Blue Bombers. Richards played in just four regular season games in 2023 as he spent the rest of the season on the injured list. His contract expired in the following offseason on February 13, 2024.

=== Edmonton Elks ===
On April 9, 2024, Richards signed with the Edmonton Elks in free agency. He played in 16 regular season games in 2024. He became a free agent upon the expiry of his contract on February 11, 2025.

=== Toronto Argonauts (second stint) ===
On July 21, 2025, it was announced that Richards had signed with the Toronto Argonauts. He played in 12 games in 2025 and became a free agent upon the expiry of his contract on February 10, 2026.
