= Matt Boateng =

Canadian football player (born 1996)

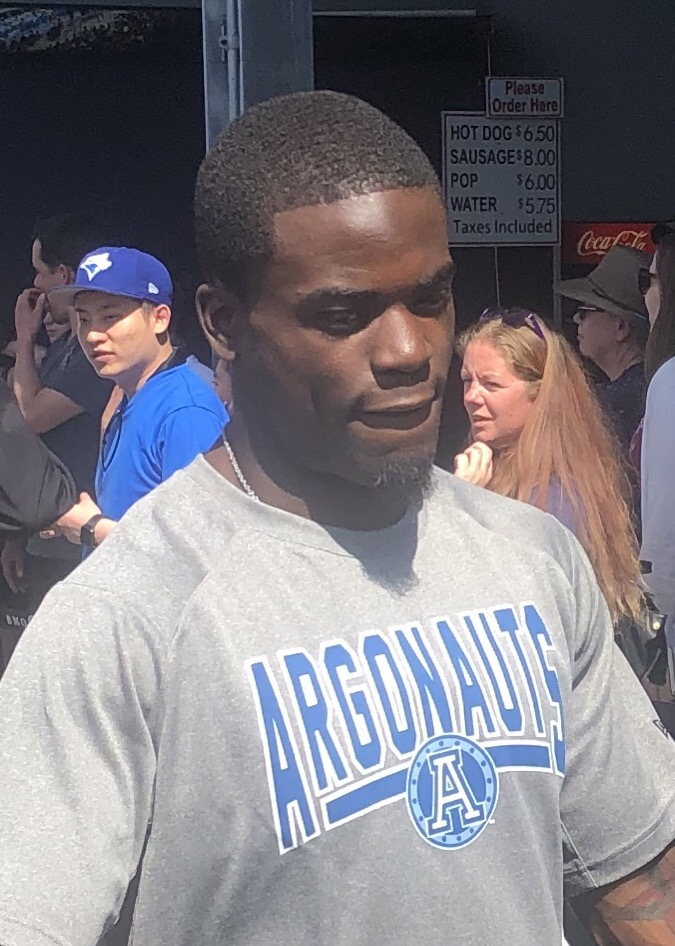
- Boateng with the Toronto Argonauts in 2019

No. 28
- Position: Defensive back

Personal information
- Born: May 23, 1996 (age 30); Ajax, Ontario, Canada
- Listed height: 5 ft 11 in (1.80 m)
- Listed weight: 188 lb (85 kg)

Career information
- High school: Pickering High
- College: Fresno State; Arizona Western; Kansas Jayhawks
- CFL draft: 2019: 2nd round, 18th overall pick

Career history
- 2019–2022: Toronto Argonauts
- Stats at CFL.ca

Matthew Boateng (born May 23, 1996) is a Canadian former professional football defensive back who played for the Toronto Argonauts of the Canadian Football League (CFL).

== College career ==
Boateng played college football with the Kansas Jayhawks in 2016, the Arizona Western Matadors in 2016, and the Fresno State Bulldogs in 2017 and 2018.

== Professional career ==
Boateng was drafted by the Toronto Argonauts in the second round as a territorial exemption, 18th overall, in the 2019 CFL draft and signed with the club on May 17, 2019. He played in his first career professional game on July 1, 2019 against the Saskatchewan Roughriders. Over the course of the 2019 season, he played in 12 games and recorded eight defensive tackles and one special teams tackle.

Due to the cancellation of the 2020 CFL season, Boateng did not play in 2020. He later re-signed with the Argonauts on December 15, 2020. Boateng returned to the team in 2021 and dressed for 12 games, making three defensive tackles and two special teams tackles. He played one game for the Argos during the 2022 season, before being released on July 13, 2022.
