= Eric Starczala =

Canadian gridiron football player (born 1996)

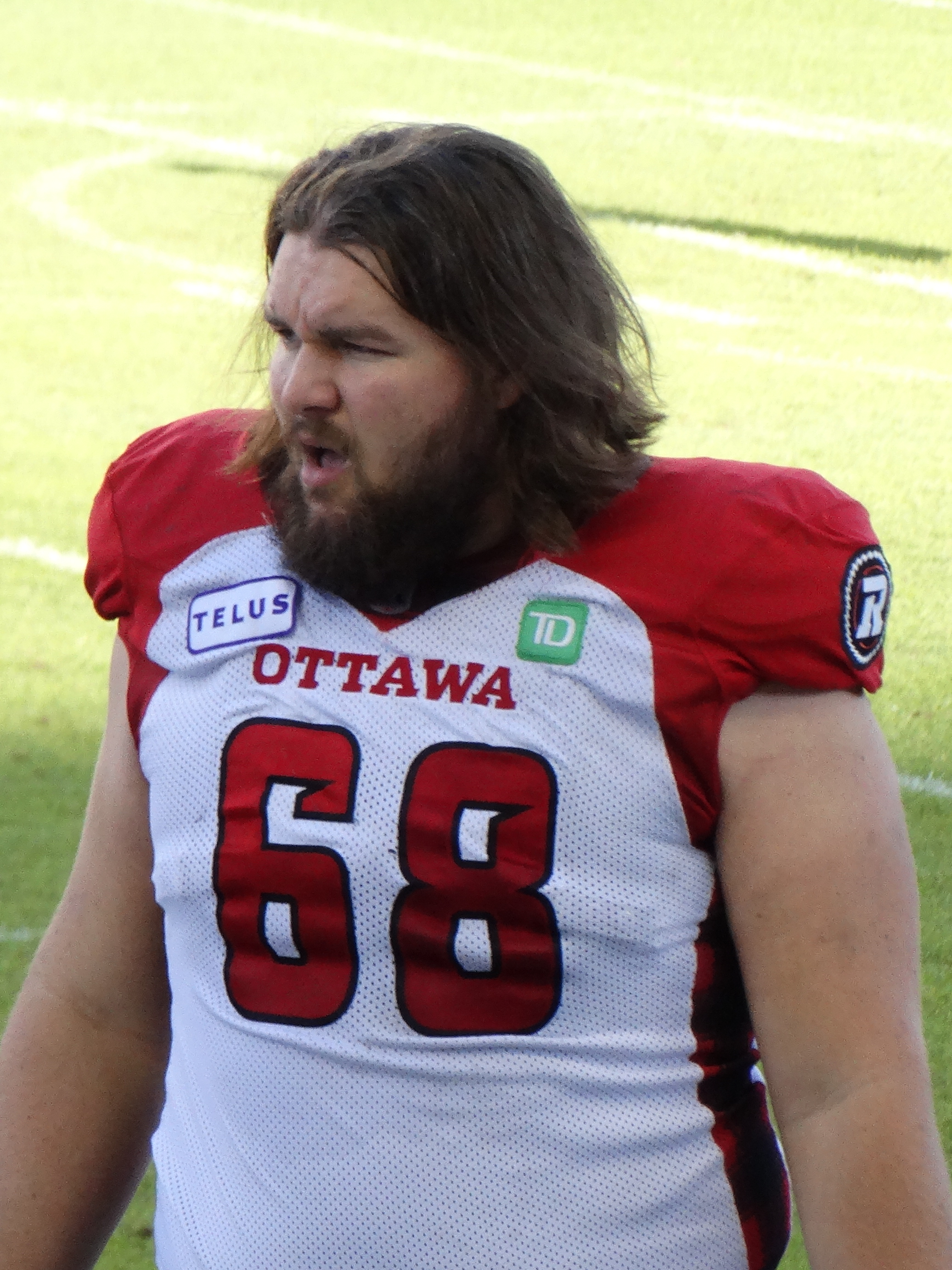
- Starczala with the Ottawa Redblacks in 2024

No. 58 – Ottawa Redblacks
- Position: Offensive lineman
- Roster status: Active
- CFL status: National

Personal information
- Born: August 6, 1996 (age 30); Cambridge, Ontario, Canada
- Listed height: 6 ft 4 in (1.93 m)
- Listed weight: 307 lb (139 kg)

Career information
- High school: Jacob Hespeler (Cambridge)
- University: Guelph (2014–2019)
- CFL draft: 2019: 7th round, 62nd overall pick

Career history
- 2019: Toronto Argonauts*
- 2020–2021: Toronto Argonauts*
- 2022–present: Ottawa Redblacks
- * Offseason or practice squad member only
- Stats at CFL.ca

Eric Starczala (born August 6, 1996) is a Canadian professional football offensive lineman for the Ottawa Redblacks of the Canadian Football League (CFL). He played U Sports football at Guelph. He has also been a member of the Toronto Argonauts of the CFL.

== Early life ==
Starczala attended Jacob Hespeler Secondary School in Cambridge, Ontario.

== University career ==
Starczala was first a member of the Guelph Gryphons football team of U Sports football from 2014 to 2018. However, he did not play in 2014.

== Professional career ==
Pre-draft measurables
Height	Weight	40-yard dash	20-yard shuttle	Three-cone drill	Vertical jump	Broad jump	Bench press
6 ft 3 3/4 in (1.92 m)	307 lb (139 kg)	5.46 s	5.00 s	8.25 s	24.5 in (0.62 m)	8 ft 6 1/4 in (2.60 m)	24 reps
All values from CFL Combine

=== Toronto Argonauts ===
Starczala was selected by the Toronto Argonauts of the Canadian Football League (CFL) in the seventh round, with the 62nd overall pick, of the 2019 CFL draft. He officially signed with the team on May 16, 2019. Starczala was cut before the start of the 2019 CFL season, and returned to Guelph for his sixth season of U Sports football.

After the 2019 U Sports football season, Starczala signed with the Argonauts again on November 25, 2019. The 2020 CFL season was cancelled due to the COVID-19 pandemic. He was later released by the Argonauts on July 28, 2021 before the start of the 2021 season.

=== Ottawa Redblacks ===
Starczala was signed by the Ottawa Redblacks of the CFL on January 3, 2022. He was moved to the practice roster on June 5, and was released on October 30. He later re-signed with the Redblacks on November 21, 2022. He did not dress in any regular season games in 2022.

Starczala was moved between the practice roster and active roster many times during the 2023 season. Overall, he dressed in two games for the Redblacks that year. In 2024, he again began the season on the practice roster, but due to an injury to Cyrille Hogan-Saindon, Starczala made his first career start on August 15, 2024, in the win against the Calgary Stampeders. He played and started in the final ten games of the regular season that year and also made his playoff debut in the East Semi-Final, starting at centre in the loss to the Toronto Argonauts.

In 2025, Starczala spent the entire season on the injured list. He became a free agent upon the expiry of his contract on February 10, 2026.

On September 29, 2026, Starczala signed with the Redblacks practice squad.
