= Roubbens Joseph =

American gridiron football player (born 1994)

No. 71
- Position: Offensive lineman

Personal information
- Born: December 21, 1994 (age 31); Springfield, Massachusetts, U.S.
- Listed height: 6 ft 4 in (1.93 m)
- Listed weight: 325 lb (147 kg)

Career information
- High school: High School of Commerce
- College: Hudson Valley (2013–2014); Buffalo (2015–2016)
- NFL draft: 2017: undrafted

Career history
- Baltimore Ravens (2017)*; Miami Dolphins (2018)*; Washington Redskins (2018–2019)*; Toronto Argonauts (2019–2020); Massachusetts Pirates (2022); San Antonio Brahmas (2023); West Texas Desert Hawks (2024)*
- * Offseason or practice squad member only

Career CFL statistics
- Games played: 3
- Games started: 3
- Stats at CFL.ca
- Stats at Pro Football Reference

Roubbens Joseph (born December 21, 1994) is an American former professional gridiron football offensive lineman. He played college football at the University at Buffalo.

== Professional career ==
=== National Football League ===
Following the end of his college football career, Joseph was signed as a free agent by the Baltimore Ravens, Miami Dolphins, and Washington Redskins of the National Football League.

=== Canadian Football League ===
Joseph signed with the Toronto Argonauts of the Canadian Football League (CFL) in 2019, playing in 3 games. He made his CFL debut in the starting lineup on July 25, 2019, against the Edmonton Eskimos.

On February 1, 2021, Joseph was released by the Argonauts.

=== Indoor Football League ===
On December 17, 2021, Joseph signed with the Massachusetts Pirates of the Indoor Football League (IFL).

=== San Antonio Brahmas ===
On November 17, 2022, Joseph was drafted in the 6th round of the 2023 XFL draft by the San Antonio Brahmas. He was removed from the team roster on August 3, 2023.

=== West Texas Desert Hawks ===
On January 11, 2024, the Desert Hawks signed Joseph.
