= Jhaustin Thomas =

American football player (born 1993)

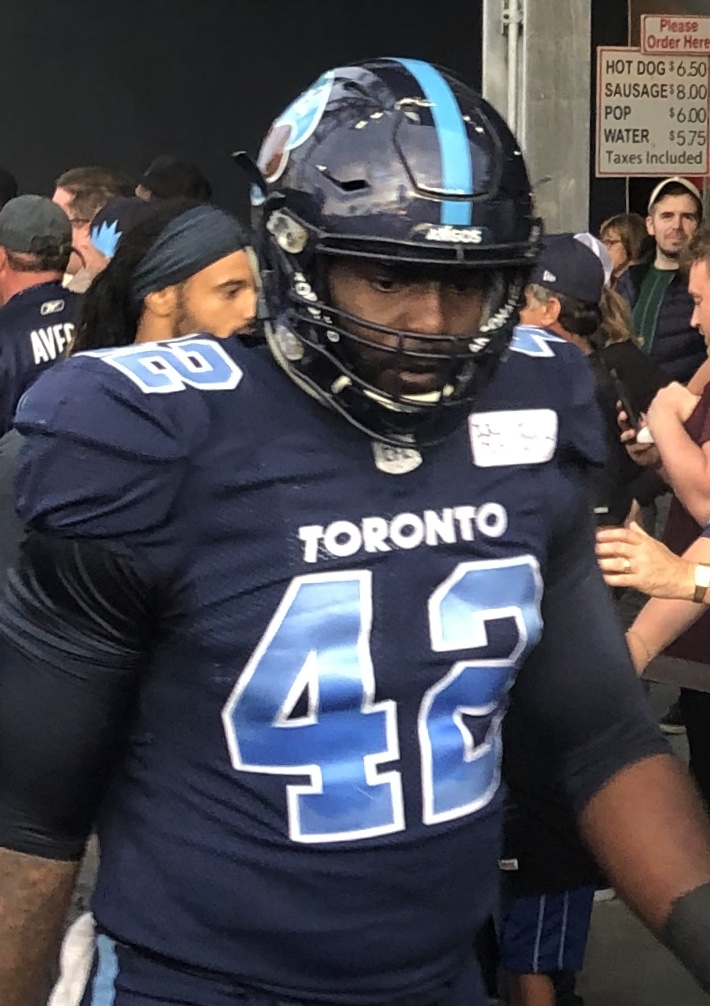
- Thomas Toronto Argonauts in 2019

No. 42
- Position: Defensive lineman

Personal information
- Born: April 13, 1993 (age 33); Atlanta, Georgia, U.S.
- Listed height: 6 ft 6 in (1.98 m)
- Listed weight: 275 lb (125 kg)

Career information
- High school: Columbia High (Decatur, Georgia)
- College: Iowa State; Trinity Valley
- NFL draft: 2017: undrafted

Career history
- 2017: Indianapolis Colts*
- 2017: Cleveland Browns*
- 2017: Oakland Raiders*
- 2017–2018: Denver Broncos*
- 2019–2020: Toronto Argonauts
- 2021: Hamilton Tiger-Cats*
- * Offseason or practice squad member only
- Stats at Pro Football Reference
- Stats at CFL.ca

Jhaustin Thomas (born April 13, 1993) is an American former professional football defensive lineman. He played college football for the Trinity Valley Cardinals from 2013 to 2014 and the Iowa State Cyclones from 2015 to 2016.

== Professional career ==
=== Indianapolis Colts ===
After going undrafted in the 2017 NFL draft, Thomas signed as an undrafted free agent with the Indianapolis Colts on May 4, 2017. He played in all four pre-season games in 2017, but was part of final roster cuts on September 2, 2017.

=== Cleveland Browns ===
Thomas signed a practice squad agreement with the Cleveland Browns on September 19, 2017, but was released shortly after on September 22, 2017.

=== Oakland Raiders ===
On October 25, 2017, Thomas signed with the Oakland Raiders, but he was released on October 28, 2017.

=== Denver Broncos ===
Thomas signed with the Denver Broncos on December 7, 2017 to their practice squad where he remained for the rest of the 2017 NFL season. He signed a futures contract after the season ended, but was released on April 30, 2018.

=== Toronto Argonauts ===
Thomas signed with the Toronto Argonauts during the team's training camp on May 25, 2019. He played in the team's first preseason game on May 30, 2019 where he was injured and subsequently released on June 1, 2019. He was re-signed to a practice roster agreement on July 17, 2019 where he remained until making his professional regular season debut on August 16, 2019 in a start against the Edmonton Eskimos where he had one defensive tackle. He recorded his first sack on September 2, 2019 in the Labour Day Classic against the Hamilton Tiger-Cats. In total, he played in 11 regular season games, making five starts at tackle, while recording 14 defensive tackles and one sack.

In the following off-season, Thomas signed a contract extension with the Argonauts on December 9, 2019. However, the 2020 CFL season was cancelled and Thomas did not play in 2020. He then signed another extension on December 18, 2020. However, he was released following the end of the team's training camp on July 29, 2021.

=== Hamilton Tiger-Cats ===
On August 13, 2021, it was announced that Thomas had signed with the Hamilton Tiger-Cats. He spent time on the team's practice roster and was eventually released on September 27, 2021.
