= Randy Richards =

Jamaican-born offensive lineman (born 1991)

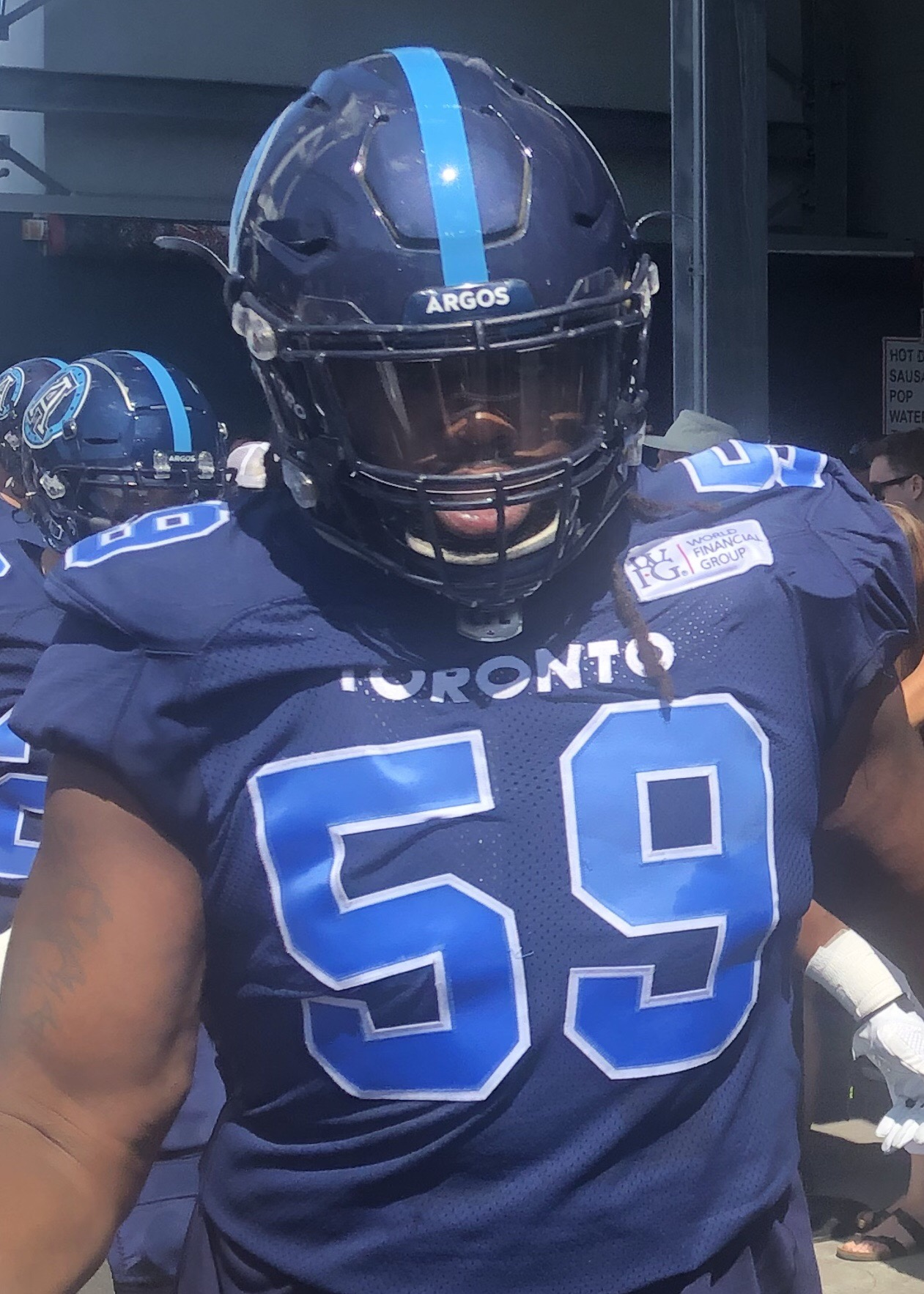
- Richards with the Toronto Argonauts in 2019

Profile
- Position: Offensive tackle

Personal information
- Born: January 24, 1991 (age 35); Kingston, Jamaica
- Listed height: 6 ft 3 in (1.91 m)
- Listed weight: 304 lb (138 kg)

Career information
- High school: Royal Palm Beach
- College: Missouri State

Career history
- 2013: San Diego Chargers*
- 2013: Tampa Bay Buccaneers*
- 2015: Saskatchewan Roughriders
- 2015–2018: Calgary Stampeders
- 2019–2020: Toronto Argonauts
- 2021: Edmonton Football Team / Elks*
- 2022: Ottawa Redblacks
- * Offseason or practice squad member only

Awards and highlights
- Grey Cup champion (2018)
- Stats at CFL.ca

Randy Shimon Richards (born January 24, 1991) is a Jamaican-American former professional football offensive lineman who played in the Canadian Football League (CFL). He made his professional debut in 2015 with the Saskatchewan Roughriders and won his first Grey Cup championship with the Calgary Stampeders in 2018. Richards was also a member of the San Diego Chargers, Tampa Bay Buccaneers, Toronto Argonauts, Edmonton Football Team, and Ottawa Redblacks. He played college football for the Missouri State Bears and the College of the Sequoias.

== Professional career ==
=== NFL ===
Richards was originally signed as an undrafted free agent by the San Diego Chargers of the National Football League (NFL) on April 27, 2013 and also spent time with the Tampa Bay Buccaneers that year before being released on October 16, 2013. He was unsigned by a team in 2014.

=== Saskatchewan Roughriders ===
Richards made his way to the CFL with the Saskatchewan Roughriders and signed with the team on May 29, 2015. He made his professional debut starting at right tackle on August 22, 2015 against the Calgary Stampeders. Richards played in two games for the Riders during the 2015 season.

=== Calgary Stampeders ===
Richards was traded to the Calgary Stampeders on September 29, 2015, and played in the final game of the season. He was re-signed by the Stampeders following the season. From 2016 to 2018, he saw spot starting duties playing at both left and right tackle. He won the 106th Grey Cup with the Stampeders as the team's starting right tackle.

=== Toronto Argonauts ===
In the following off-season, he signed with the Toronto Argonauts on March 6, 2019. He played in 12 games for the Argonauts in 2019. He did not play in 2020 due to the cancellation of the 2020 CFL season and was released by the Argonauts on December 15, 2020.

=== Edmonton Football Team / Elks ===
Richards signed with the Edmonton Football Team on January 31, 2021. However, he retired from football on June 24, 2021 before the season started.

=== Ottawa Redblacks ===
On March 21, 2022 the Ottawa Redblacks announced that Richards (age 31) had agreed to a contract to join the team. On February 14, 2023, Richards became a free agent.
