= 2019 CFL draft =

Canadian football draft

2019 CFL Draft

General information
- Sport: Canadian football
- Date: May 2, 2019
- Time: 8:00 pm EDT
- Location: Toronto
- Network: TSN/RDS

Overview
- 73 total selections in 8 rounds
- First selection: Shane Richards OL, Toronto Argonauts
- Most selections: Toronto Argonauts (10)
- Fewest selections: Saskatchewan Roughriders (6)
- U Sports selections: 52
- NCAA selections: 21

The 2019 CFL draft took place on May 2, 2019 at 8:00 pm ET and was broadcast on TSN and RDS. 73 players were chosen from among eligible players from Canadian universities, as well as Canadian players playing in the United States on NCAA or NAIA teams.

The draft was broadcast live on TSN and RDS for two hours and then switched to digital platforms on TSN.ca and TSN GO. Randy Ambrosie, the CFL commissioner, was at the TSN studios in Toronto to announce the first twenty picks.

== Top prospects ==
Source: CFL Scouting Bureau rankings.

Final Ranking	December Ranking	August Ranking	Player	Position	University	Hometown
1	1	2	Mathieu Betts	Defensive lineman	Laval	Montreal, QC
2	2	4	Shane Richards	Offensive lineman	Oklahoma State	Calgary, AB
3	3	5	Justin McInnis	Receiver	Arkansas State	Pierrefonds, QC
4	17	8	Zach Wilkinson	Offensive lineman	Northern Colorado	Vancouver, BC
5	6	3	Hergy Mayala	Receiver	UConn	Montreal, QC
6	4	1	Jonathan Kongbo	Defensive lineman	Tennessee	Surrey, BC
7	-	-	Drew Desjarlais	Offensive lineman	Windsor	Belle River, ON
8	8	11	Maleek Irons	Running back	Ohio	Chilliwack, BC
9	13	14	Kaion Julien-Grant	Receiver	St. Francis Xavier	Toronto, ON
10	5	9	Alex Fontana	Offensive lineman	Kansas	Toronto, ON
11	-	-	Brayden Lenius	Receiver	New Mexico	North Vancouver, BC
12	16	12	Samuel Thomassin	Offensive lineman	Laval	Quebec, QC
13	11	18	Maurice Simba	Offensive lineman	Concordia	Laval, QC
14	-	-	Jesse Gibbon	Offensive lineman	Waterloo	Hamilton, ON
15	12	15	Robbie Smith	Defensive lineman	Wilfrid Laurier	Brampton, ON
16	9	13	Kurleigh Gittens, Jr.	Receiver	Wilfrid Laurier	Ottawa, ON
17	19	20	Michael O'Connor	Quarterback	British Columbia	Orleans, ON
18	10	7	Brady Oliveira	Running back	North Dakota	Winnipeg, MB
19	-	-	Malcolm Lee	Defensive back	British Columbia	Surrey, BC
20	7	10	Alexandre Savard	Receiver	Laval	Quebec, QC
-	14	19	Fraser Sopik	Linebacker	Western	Toronto, ON
-	15	17	Jamie Harry	Defensive back	Ottawa	Lachine, QC
-	18	-	Trivel Pinto	Receiver	British Columbia	Toronto, ON
-	20	-	Nate Anderson	Defensive lineman	Missouri	Toronto, ON
-	-	6	Dejon Brissett	Receiver	Richmond	Mississauga, ON
-	-	16	Jamel Lyles	Running back	Manitoba	Surrey, BC

== Trades ==
In the explanations below, (D) denotes trades that took place during the draft, while (PD) indicates trades completed pre-draft.

=== Round one ===
- BC → Winnipeg (PD). BC traded this selection and a second-round pick in the 2018 CFL draft to Winnipeg in exchange for a first-round pick and a second-round pick in the 2018 CFL draft.

=== Round two ===
- Montreal → Hamilton (PD). Montreal traded this selection and the first, 31st, and 44th overall selections in the 2018 CFL draft to Hamilton in exchange for the second, 34th, and 56th overall picks in the 2018 CFL draft, Ryan Bomben, and Jamal Robinson.
- BC → Montreal (PD). BC traded this selection to Montreal in exchange for Tyrell Sutton and a third-round pick in this year's draft.
- Ottawa → Montreal (PD). Ottawa traded this selection to Montreal in exchange for Chris Ackie.

=== Round three ===
- Saskatchewan → Montreal (PD). Saskatchewan traded this selection, Tevaughn Campbell, and a third-round pick in the 2018 CFL draft to Montreal for Vernon Adams and a fifth-round pick in the 2018 CFL draft.
- Edmonton → Toronto (PD). Edmonton traded this selection to Toronto in exchange for Martese Jackson and a conditional sixth-round pick in the 2020 CFL draft.
- Montreal → BC (PD). Montreal traded this selection and Tyrell Sutton to BC in exchange for a second-round pick in this year's draft.
- BC → Hamilton (PD). BC traded this selection to Hamilton in exchange for a sixth-round pick in this year's draft and Davon Coleman. This was originally a fourth-round pick, but was revealed to be a third-round pick when the official draft order was released.

=== Round four ===
- Hamilton → Calgary (PD). Hamilton traded this selection and fourth-round pick in the 2018 CFL draft to Calgary in exchange for Charleston Hughes and the 34th overall pick (fourth round) in the 2018 CFL draft.

=== Round five ===
- Hamilton → Edmonton (PD). Hamilton traded this selection and a seventh-round pick in the 2018 CFL draft to Edmonton in exchange for Shamawd Chambers.

=== Round six ===
- Hamilton → BC (PD). Hamilton traded this selection and Davon Coleman to BC in exchange for a fourth-round pick in this year's draft.

=== Round seven ===
- Saskatchewan → Toronto (PD). Saskatchewan traded this selection to Toronto in exchange for Brian Jones.

=== Round eight ===
- Toronto → Hamilton (PD). Toronto traded this selection to Hamilton in exchange for Abdul Kanneh.

=== Conditional trades ===
- Montreal → Winnipeg (PD). Montreal traded a conditional eighth-round selection to Winnipeg in exchange for Adarius Bowman. This condition was not fulfilled and Montreal kept the selection.

== Territorial exemptions ==
Beginning in 2019, the CFL announced the two teams with the highest waiver priority will each get to make one Territorial Draft Pick (to be used to select a player born within their territorial limits at the end of the second round). The two teams that qualified for the 2019 Draft were Montreal and Toronto and these picks were made with the 17th and 18th overall picks.

This was the first time since 1984 that the league’s draft featured territorial selections. From 1972 to 1982, each club had the right to pre-select two players from its region who would be exempted from the draft. That limit was reduced to one Draft exemption selection in 1983 and 1984, and then the practice was terminated altogether prior to the 1985 Canadian Draft.

== Forfeitures ==
- Montreal forfeited their first round pick after selecting Tyler Johnstone in the 2018 Supplemental Draft.

== Draft order ==
=== Round one ===
Pick #	CFL team	Player	Position	University
1	Toronto Argonauts	Shane Richards	OL	Oklahoma State
–	Montreal Alouettes	Selection forfeited		
2	Hamilton Tiger-Cats	Jesse Gibbon	OL	Waterloo
3	Edmonton Eskimos	Mathieu Betts	DL	Laval
4	Winnipeg Blue Bombers (via BC)	Drew Desjarlais	OL	Windsor
5	Winnipeg Blue Bombers	Jonathan Kongbo	DL	Tennessee
6	Saskatchewan Roughriders	Justin McInnis	WR	Arkansas State
7	Ottawa Redblacks	Alex Fontana	OL	Kansas
8	Calgary Stampeders	Hergy Mayala	WR	UConn

=== Round two ===
Pick #	CFL team	Player	Position	University
9	Toronto Argonauts	Robbie Smith	DL	Wilfrid Laurier
10	Hamilton Tiger-Cats (via Montreal)	Nikola Kalinic	WR	York
11	Hamilton Tiger-Cats	David Ungerer	WR	Idaho
12	Edmonton Eskimos	Kyle Saxelid	OL	Nevada, Las Vegas
13	Montreal Alouettes (via BC)	Kaion Julien-Grant	WR	St. Francis Xavier
14	Winnipeg Blue Bombers	Brady Oliveira	RB	North Dakota
15	Saskatchewan Roughriders	Brayden Lenius	WR	New Mexico
16	Montreal Alouettes (via Ottawa)	Nate Anderson	DL	Missouri
17	Calgary Stampeders	Vincent Desjardins	DL	Laval
18 (Note: Territorial draft pick)	Toronto Argonauts	Matthew Boateng	DB	Fresno State
19	Montreal Alouettes	Samuel Thomassin	OL	Laval

=== Round three ===
Pick #	CFL team	Player	Position	University
20	Toronto Argonauts	Michael O'Connor	QB	British Columbia
21	Montreal Alouettes	Zach Wilkinson	OL	Northern Colorado
22	Hamilton Tiger-Cats	Maleek Irons	RB	Ohio
23	Toronto Argonauts (via Edmonton)	Kurleigh Gittens, Jr.	WR	Wilfrid Laurier
24	Hamilton Tiger-Cats (via BC)	Sheridan Lawley	DL	British Columbia
25	Winnipeg Blue Bombers	Connor Griffiths	DL	British Columbia
26	BC Lions (via Montreal via Saskatchewan)	Noah Robinson	LB	Missouri
27	Ottawa Redblacks	Gabriel Polan	RB	Sherbrooke
28	Calgary Stampeders	Zack Williams	OL	Manitoba

=== Round four ===
Pick #	CFL team	Player	Position	University
29	Toronto Argonauts	Maurice Simba	OL	Concordia
30	Montreal Alouettes	Chris Osei-Kusi	WR	Queen's
31	Calgary Stampeders (via Hamilton)	Fraser Sopik	LB	Western
32	Edmonton Eskimos	Peter Cender	FB	Grand Valley State
33	BC Lions	Hakeem Johnson	DB	Western
34	Winnipeg Blue Bombers	Tavita Eli	OL	Hawai'i
35	Saskatchewan Roughriders	Jacob Janke	LB	York
36	Ottawa Redblacks	Thomas Grant	DL	Acadia
37	Calgary Stampeders	Jaylan Guthrie	OL	Guelph

=== Round five ===
Pick #	CFL team	Player	Position	University
38	Toronto Argonauts	Jamie Harry	DB	Ottawa
39	Montreal Alouettes	Michael Sanelli	DT	Concordia
40	Edmonton Eskimos (via Hamilton)	Shai Ross	WR	Manitoba
41	Edmonton Eskimos	Evan Machibroda	DL	Saskatchewan
42	BC Lions	Jonathan Harke	OL	Alberta
43	Winnipeg Blue Bombers	Malik Richards	WR	Mount Allison
44	Saskatchewan Roughriders	Charbel Dabire	DL	Wagner
45	Ottawa Redblacks	Wesley Lewis	WR	Houston Baptist
46	Calgary Stampeders	Malcolm Lee	DB	British Columbia

=== Round six ===
Pick #	CFL team	Player	Position	University
47	Toronto Argonauts	Joe Spaziani	LS	Virginia
48	Montreal Alouettes	Jeshrun Antwi	RB	Calgary
49	BC Lions (via Hamilton)	Charles Nwoye	DE	British Columbia
50	Edmonton Eskimos	Scott Hutter	DB	Wilfrid Laurier
51	BC Lions	Mario Villamizar	FB	Wilfrid Laurier
52	Winnipeg Blue Bombers	Tariq Lachance	DL	Manitoba
53	Saskatchewan Roughriders	Vincent Roy	OL	Sherbrooke
54	Ottawa Redblacks	Chris Larsen	DL	Manitoba
55	Calgary Stampeders	Nicholas Statz	DB	Calgary

=== Round seven ===
Pick #	CFL team	Player	Position	University
56	Toronto Argonauts	Phil Iloki	WR	Carleton
57	Montreal Alouettes	Benjamin Whiting	LB	Saskatchewan
58	Hamilton Tiger-Cats	Derek Dufault	DL	Manitoba
59	Edmonton Eskimos	Hunter Karl	WR	Calgary
60	BC Lions	Brad Lyons	DL	Simon Fraser
61	Winnipeg Blue Bombers	Nick Hallett	DB	Toronto
62	Toronto Argonauts (via Saskatchewan)	Eric Starczala	OL	Guelph
63	Ottawa Redblacks	Samson Abbott	DL	Manitoba
64	Calgary Stampeders	Job Reinhart	LB	Guelph

=== Round eight ===
Pick #	CFL team	Player	Position	University
65	Hamilton Tiger-Cats (via Toronto)	Malcolm Campbell	DL	Toronto
66	Montreal Alouettes	Cody Cranston	DB	Ottawa
67	Hamilton Tiger-Cats	Gordon Whyte	LB	St. Francis Xavier
68	Edmonton Eskimos	Eric Blake	DB	McMaster
69	BC Lions	Jamel Lyles	RB	Manitoba
70	Winnipeg Blue Bombers	Kerfalla Emmanuel Exumé	DB	Montreal
71	Saskatchewan Roughriders	Christopher Judge	DL	Cal Poly
72	Ottawa Redblacks	Clement Lebreux	DL	Laval
73	Calgary Stampeders	Colton Hunchak	WR	York

== See also ==
- 2019 CFL–LFA draft
- 2019 European CFL draft
