= List of current CFL team rosters =

The following is a list of current Canadian Football League (CFL) team rosters:

== West Division ==
=== BC Lions ===
BC Lions roster
| **Quarterbacks**: 7 Chase Brice; 11 Jeremiah Masoli; 12 Nathan Rourke; -- Garrett Shrader; **Receivers**: 88 Jared Bernhardt; 83 Stanley Berryhill III; -- Victor Bolden Jr.; -- Lynn Bowden Jr.; -- Devin Carter; -- Stacy Chukwumezie; 86 Jevon Cottoy; 19 Ayden Eberhardt; -- Bailey Gaither; 4 Keon Hatcher Sr.; -- Hayden Hatten; -- Rysen John; -- Ed Lee; -- Brayden Lenius; 18 Justin McInnis; 82 Kieren Poissant; -- Jalen Sample; 80 Ezechiel Tieide; -- M. J. Wright | **Running backs**: 20 James Butler; -- Zander Horvath; -- Jason Huntley; -- Qadree Ollison; -- Nathaniel Peat; -- D'Vonte Price; 28 Jordan Terrell; **Fullback**: 37 Dylan St. Pierre; **Offensive linemen**: -- Ulumoo Ale; 50 Dejon Allen; 69 Jarell Broxton; 51 Michael Couture; 68 David Foucault; -- X'Zauvea Gadlin; -- Derwin Gray; 62 Tyler Packer; 54 Andrew Peirson; 57 Chris Schleuger; -- Tyler Smith; 63 Tairiq Stewart; 61 George Una; 64 Kory Woodruff | **Defensive linemen**: 98 Francis Bemiy Jr.; 90 Mathieu Betts; 91 Nathan Cherry; 56 Christian Covington; -- Tre' Crawford; 49 Tibo Debaillie; 79 Juliano Falaniko; -- Xavier Henderson; 14 DeWayne Hendrix; -- Jeffrey Johnson; 95 Marcus Moore; -- Scean Mustin-Sherman; -- Adam Rodriguez; 98 Deshawn Stevens; 99 Jonah Tavai; 0 Sione Teuhema; **Linebackers**: 25 Adam Auclair; 3 Micah Awe; 43 Terrence Ganyi; 44 Isaiah Guzylak-Messam; 46 Ben Hladik; 31 Adam Konar; -- Devin Richardson; 32 Maxime Rouyer; 42 Mike Smith Jr.; 2 Josh Woods | **Defensive backs**: 29 Cristophe Beaulieu; -- Myles Brooks; -- Tyler Coyle; -- Johnny Dixon; 8 Jalon Edwards-Cooper; 21 Ronald Kent Jr.; -- Wyryor Noil; 23 Jordan Perryman; 1 Garry Peters; 24 Patrice Rene; 26 Charlie Ringland; 35 Amechi Uzodinma II; 9 Deontai Williams; -- Jaylin Williams; -- Anthony Witherstone; **Special teams**: 71 Carl Meyer P; 45 Riley Pickett LS; 10 Sean Whyte K |
Italics indicate American player • **Bold** indicates Global player • 89 Roster; Roster updated 2025-03-27 • Depth chart • Transactions • More CFL rosters

=== Calgary Stampeders ===
Calgary Stampeders roster
| **Quarterbacks**: 3 Vernon Adams; 1 Logan Bonner; -- Joey Gatewood; 16 Josh Love; 2 P. J. Walker; **Receivers**: -- Josh Ali; -- Daylen Baldwin; 14 Clark Barnes; 84 Reggie Begelton; 87 Erik Brooks; 17 Cameron Echols-Luper; 89 Mike Harley Jr.; 11 Malik Henry; -- Kaylon Horton; 81 Ishmael Hyman; 4 Tevin Jones; -- Maxim Malenfant; -- Tykee Ogle-Kellogg; 83 Tyson Middlemost; 86 Tre Odoms-Dukes; -- Tykee Ogle-Kellogg; 85 Jalen Philpot; 15 Dominique Rhymes; -- Terrell Vaughn; -- Marcus Washington | **Running backs**: 20 Jeshrun Antwi; -- Tiyon Evans; -- Deshaun Fenwick; 23 William Langlais; 26 Dedrick Mills; **Fullbacks**: -- Ryan Jones; **Offensive linemen**: -- William Barnes; 66 Bryce Bell; 63 Rodeem Brown; 54 Joshua Coker; 60 D'Antne Demery; -- Preston Nichols; 65 Christy Nkanu; -- Deiyantei Powell-Woods; 69 Kyle Saxelid; 67 Zack Williams | **Defensive linemen**: 98 Kwadwo Boahen; 90 Miles Brown; -- Jett Bush; -- Josh Carr Jr.; 74 Josiah Coatney; 96 Kail Dava; 94 Anthony Federico; 73 Clarence Hicks; 96 Jaylon Hutchings; 47 George Idoko; -- Savion Jackson; 71 Jason Janvier-Messier; -- Cedrick Lattimore; -- Michael Mason; -- Alex Nobles; 7 Folarin Orimolade; -- Shaun Peterson Jr.; 97 Justin Sambu; 77 Kelon Thomas; 93 Charles Wiley; **Linebackers**: -- Kelechi Anyalebechi; -- Gary Johnson Jr.; -- Trey Kiser; 50 Marquel Lee; -- Sam Mathews; -- Derrick Moncrief; 48 Jacob Roberts; -- Fraser Sopik; 42 Micah Teitz | **Defensive backs**: 25 Daniel Amoako; -- Tyler Baker-Williams; -- Anthony Cook; -- Londyn Craft; -- Ben DeLuca; 21 Bailey Devine-Scott; 33 Meiko Dotson; -- Cyrus Fagan; -- Marloshawn Franklin Jr.; 0 Adrian Greene; -- Anthony Johnson; 29 Ben Labrosse; -- Jeremy Lucien; 27 Godfrey Onyeka; 35 Tyler Richardson; 24 Bentlee Sanders; -- Jackson Sombach; 36 Kaylyn St-Cyr; -- Shon Stephens; 9 Damon Webb; **Special teams**: 52 Aaron Crawford LS; 30 Rene Paredes K |
Italics indicate American player • **Bold** indicates Global player • 87 Roster; Roster updated 2025-03-23 • Depth chart • Transactions • More CFL rosters

=== Edmonton Elks ===
Edmonton Elks roster
| **Quarterbacks**: 12 Jarret Doege; 7 Cody Fajardo; 2 Tre Ford; **Running backs**: 27 Tanner Green FB; -- Bradley Hladik FB; 22 Javon Leake KR; -- Artavis Pierce; 31 Justin Rankin; **Receivers**: 80 Frederik Antoine; -- Corey Crooms Jr.; 6 Steven Dunbar Jr.; 19 Kurleigh Gittens Jr.; 11 Kaion Julien-Grant; -- J.J. Laap; 81 Zach Mathis; -- Tyson Middlemost; -- Tre Odoms-Dukes; 86 Arkell Smith; 89 Jerminic Smith; -- Binjimen Victor | **Offensive linemen**: 57 David Beard; 69 Brett Boyko; 51 Clayton Bradley; 59 Phillip Grohovac; -- Devin Hayes; 62 Martez Ivey; 64 Tomas Jack-Kurdyla; 65 Mark Korte; -- Patrick Lavoie; -- Gregor MacKellar; 56 Jaxon Morkin; **Defensive linemen**: 95 Sam Acheampong; 4 Brandon Barlow; 91 Jared Brinkman; 94 Jake Ceresna; 92 Noah Curtis; 98 Ali Fayad; 49 Daniel Joseph; -- Jonathan Kongbo; -- Josh Landry; -- Elijah McAllister; 93 Romeo McKnight; -- David Ogwoegbu; 6 Jacob Plamondon; 59 Micah Roane; 40 Robbie Smith; 90 Jordan Strachan; 42 Noah Taylor | **Defensive backs**: 16 Devodric Bynum; -- Jerrell Cummings; 32 Demetries Ford; 30 Tyrell Ford; -- Chelen Garnes; -- Jonathan Giustini; 5 Kai Gray; 36 Jalen Green; -- Christopher Jackson; 15 Kordell Jackson; 13 Leonard Johnson; 8 Marcus Lewis; -- Kenny Logan Jr.; 9 Royce Metchie; -- Harold Nash III; -- Willie Roberts; 30 J.J. Ross; -- Steve Stephens IV; -- Roterius Torrence; 0 Kobe Williams | **Linebackers**: 48 Nick Anderson; 47 D.K. Bonhomme; 44 Michael Brodrique; 50 Joel Dublanko; -- Daniel Green; -- Clayton Isbell; 38 Eteva Mauga-Clements; 45 Nyles Morgan; 23 Olivier Muembi; 33 Emmanuel Rugamba; 40 Josiah Schakel; 13 Jake Taylor; -- Luquay Washington Jr.; **Special teams**: 25 Vincent Blanchard K; 52 Luke Burton-Krahn LS; 70 Campbell Fair K; 24 Cody Grace P; -- Toshiki Sato K | **1-game injured list** **6-game injured list** **Practice roster** **Suspended**: -- Toryque Bateman OL; -- Sewo Olonilua RB; -- Ye'Majesty Sanders OL; -- James Wiggins DB |
Italics indicate American player • **Bold** indicates Global player • 75 Roster, 0 Injured, 0 Practice, 4 Suspended; Roster updated 2025-03-23 • Depth chart • Transactions • More CFL rosters

=== Saskatchewan Roughriders ===
Saskatchewan Roughriders roster
| **Quarterbacks**: 14 Jack Coan; 7 Trevor Harris; 9 Michael Hiers; -- Jake Maier; -- Tommy Stevens; **Receivers**: 2 Mario Alford; 15 Shawn Bane Jr.; -- Ja'Marcus Bradley; 18 Dhel Duncan-Busby; 19 Samuel Emilus; 3 KeeSean Johnson; 88 Dohnte Meyers; -- D'Sean Mimbs; 81 Mitchell Picton; 82 Joe Robustelli; -- Wayne Ruby Jr.; 89 Kian Schaffer-Baker | **Running backs**: 29 Ryquell Armstead; 30 Thomas Bertrand-Hudon; -- Khalan Laborn; 45 A.J. Ouellette; -- Trent Pennix; **Fullbacks**: 41 Albert Awachie; -- Morgan Runge; **Offensive linemen**: 66 Jacob Brammer; 63 Logan Ferland; 67 Zack Fry; -- Philippe Gagnon; 52 Jermarcus Hardrick; 65 Daniel Johnson; 62 Nick Jones; -- Brandon Kemp; -- Sean McEwen; 59 Braydon Noll; 64 Trevon Tate; 68 Noah Zerr | **Defensive linemen**: 95 Habakkuk Baldonado; 94 Eric Black; -- Rondell Bothroyd; 11 Malik Carney; 99 Charbel Dabire; -- Alex Gubner; 4 Micah Johnson; 49 Lake Korte-Moore; 93 Benoit Marion; -- Shane Ray; 41 Mike Rose; 92 Caleb Sanders; -- Jordan Smith; **Linebackers**: 32 A. J. Allen; 35 C. J. Avery; 48 Jordan Herdman-Reed; 58 Justin Herdman-Reed; 39 Braxton Hill; 51 Aubrey Miller Jr.; 22 Zachary Philion; 28 Melique Straker; 6 Jameer Thurman; 43 Nick Wiebe | **Defensive backs**: -- Richard Aduboffour; 33 Antoine Brooks Jr.; 26 Tevaughn Campbell; 38 Jayden Dalke; -- Kerfalla Exumé; 22 DaMarcus Fields; 17 Jaxon Ford; -- Nicario Harper; -- Eddie Heckard; 37 Robert Javier; 21 Nelson Lokombo; 22 Tyrique McGee; 0 Rolan Milligan; 31 Kosi Onyeka; 1 C. J. Reavis; 8 Marcus Sayles; -- Alfahiym Walcott; **Special teams**: 76 Joe Couch P; -- Ben Hadley K; 46 Jorgen Hus LS; 10 Adam Korsak P; 12 Brett Lauther K |
Italics indicate American player • **Bold** indicates Global player • 81 Roster; Roster updated 2025-02-22 • Depth chart • Transactions • More CFL rosters

=== Winnipeg Blue Bombers ===
Winnipeg Blue Bombers roster
| **Quarterbacks**: 8 Zach Collaros; 15 Jake Dolegala; -- Shea Patterson; 17 Chris Streveler; 3 Terry Wilson; **Receivers**: -- D'Marcus Adams; 2 Kody Case; 86 Kevens Clercius; -- Gavin Cobb; -- Bryson Daughtry; 10 Nic Demski; 36 Abdul-Karim Gassama; 81 Jaylen Hall; -- Keilahn Harris; -- Dillon Mitchell; 0 Myron Mitchell; 83 Dalton Schoen; -- Jerreth Sterns; -- David Wallis; 88 Keric Wheatfall; -- Reggie White Jr. | **Running backs**: 20 Brady Oliveira; **Fullbacks**: 25 Michael Chris-Ike; **Offensive linemen**: 66 Stanley Bryant; 65 Asotui Eli; 51 Antonio Garcia; 67 Chris Kolankowski; 55 Eric Lofton; 53 Patrick Neufeld; 69 Kendall Randolph; 68 Micah Vanterpool; 60 Chris Walker; 61 Gabe Wallace | **Defensive linemen**: 94 Devin Adams; -- Brock Gowanlock; 5 Willie Jefferson; 97 Collin Kornelson; 99 Cameron Lawson; 43 Lucky Ogbevoen; 92 Kyle Samson; 96 Tanner Schmekel; 95 Jake Thomas; -- James Vaughters; 91 Jamal Woods; 48 Brandon Wright; **Linebackers**: 49 Michael Ayers; -- Latavious Brini; 47 Tanner Cadwallader; 39 Max Charbonneau; 44 Shayne Gauthier; -- Jonathan Jones; 33 Tony Jones; -- Enock Makonzo; 38 Jay Person; -- Marvin Pierre; 50 Fabian Weitz; 19 Kyrie Wilson | **Defensive backs**: -- Cam Allen; -- Isaiah Avery; 24 Terrell Bonds; 29 Marquise Bridges; 34 Russell Dandy; -- Javaris Davis; 32 Michael Griffin II; 26 Josh Hagerty; 21 Nick Hallett; 31 Evan Holm; 16 Jake Kelly; 6 Redha Kramdi; -- Duron Lowe; -- Quandre Mosley; 1 Deatrick Nichols; 7 Jamal Parker; -- Patrick Rogers; -- Jordan Toles; -- Trey Vaval; **Special teams**: 40 Mike Benson LS; 14 Sergio Castillo K; -- Ian Leroux LS; 18 Jamieson Sheahan P |
Italics indicate American player • **Bold** indicates Global player • 78 Roster; Roster updated 2025-02-21 • Depth chart • Transactions • More CFL rosters

== East Division ==
=== Hamilton Tiger-Cats ===
Hamilton Tiger-Cats roster
| **Quarterbacks**: 18 Harrison Frost; 16 Gavin Hardison; 19 Bo Levi Mitchell; 7 Taylor Powell; 3 Taulia Tagovailoa; **Receivers**: 17 Shemar Bridges; -- Phillip Brooks; 87 Keaton Bruggeling; -- Brevin Easton; 81 Luther Hakunavanhu; 13 O. J. Hiliare; -- Cephus Johnson III; 14 Josh Johnson; 89 Kenny Lawler; 4 Brendan O'Leary-Orange; 84 Jevoni Robinson; -- Trea Shropshire; 85 Kiondre Smith; 88 Tyler Ternowski; 12 Tim White; 82 Drew Wolitarsky; 80 Isaiah Wooden; -- Isaiah Zuber | **Running backs**: 27 Johnny Augustine; 5 Greg Bell; 22 Spencer Brown; 34 Ante Milanovic-Litre; 32 Matthew Peterson; 13 Chris Smith; **Fullbacks**: 38 Félix Garand-Gauthier; **Offensive linemen**: 59 Quinton Barrow; 55 Dayton Black; 53 Brendan Bordner; 66 Liam Dobson; 61 Nathaniel Dumoulin Duguay; 56 John Kourtis; -- Nicolas Melsop; 69 Jordan Murray; 57 Brandon Revenberg; 63 Jakub Szott; 64 Coulter Woodmansey | **Defensive linemen**: 98 Luke Brubacher; 91 Miles Fox; 9 TyJuan Garbutt; 95 Julian Howsare; 47 Owen Hubert; 90 Mario Kendricks Jr.; 93 Reece Martin; 96 Christian McCarroll; -- Philip Ossai; 44 Casey Sayles; 99 Spencer Waege; **Linebackers**: 36 Ryan Baker; 41 Brian Cole II; 39 Nic Cross; 42 Trevor Hoyte; -- Tyler Murray; 20 D.Q. Thomas; 50 Mitchell Townsend; 0 Rayshawn Wilborn; 15 Kyle Wilson | **Defensive backs**: 8 DaShaun Amos; 28 Siriman Bagayogo; 48 Daniel Bell; -- Tyler Boatwright; 29 Patrick Burke Jr.; -- D. J. Daniel; -- Josh DeBerry; 00 Darren Evans; 30 Stavros Katsantonis; 6 Jonathan Moxey; 24 Robert Panabaker; 2 Jamal Peters; 1 Reggie Stubblefield; 25 Destin Talbert; -- Zamari Walton; 23 Quavian White; 37 Lawrence Woods DB/KR; **Special teams**: 31 Nik Constantinou P; 33 Marc Liegghio K; 58 Gordon Whyte LS |
Italics indicate American player • **Bold** indicates Global player • 78 Roster; Roster updated 2025-03-23 • Depth chart • Transactions • More CFL rosters

=== Montreal Alouettes ===
Montreal Alouettes roster
| **Quarterbacks**: 10 Davis Alexander; -- McLeod Bethel-Thompson; 5 Caleb Evans; 16 James Morgan; **Receivers**: 80 Jose Barbon; 3 Régis Cibasu; 87 Shedler Fervius; 89 James Letcher Jr. WR/KR; 88 Tyjon Lindsey; 81 Austin Mack; -- Kyric McGowan; 83 Daniel Oladejo; 6 Tyson Philpot; 14 Charleston Rambo; 85 Tyler Snead; 17 Cole Spieker; -- Jalen Wayne | **Running backs**: -- Daijun Edwards; 25 Walter Fletcher; -- Tanner Nelmes; 35 Stevie Scott III; 21 Sean Thomas Erlington; **Fullbacks**: 39 David Dallaire; 38 Jacob Mason; **Offensive linemen**: 62 Nick Callender; 65 Joshua Donovan; 67 Jesse Gibbon; 69 Theo Grant; -- Des Holmes; 54 Justin Lawrence; 66 Pier-Olivier Lestage; 61 Jamar McGloster; 64 Ed Montilus; 55 Nouredin Nouili; 68 Donald Ventrelli | **Defensive linemen**: 91 Isaac Adeyemi-Berglund; -- Praise Amaewhule; -- Joshua Archibald; -- Anthony Bennett; -- Jerron Cage; 44 Jordan Domineck; 94 Mustafa Johnson; -- Buddha Jones; -- Trevon Mason; 99 Antonio Moultrie; -- Shawn Oakman; -- Joe Ozougwo; 96 Lwal Uguak; 98 Dylan Wynn; **Linebackers**: 26 Tyrice Beverette; 19 Geoffrey Cantin-Arku; 46 K. D. Davis; 34 Alexandre Gagné; -- Trezmen Marshall; 42 Tyrell Richards; 1 Darnell Sankey; 47 Tre Thomas; -- Barrington Wade | **Defensive backs**: -- Cameron Brown; 43 Lorenzo Burns; 30 Bryce Cosby; -- Vincent Delisle; 24 Marc-Antoine Dequoy; 48 Kabion Ento; -- DeShawn Gaddie Jr.; 33 Arthur Hamlin; -- Robert Kennedy; 29 Cre'Von LeBlanc; -- Darion McKenzie; -- Tiawan Mullen; 12 Najee Murray; 22 Dionte Ruffin; -- Matt Severance; 37 Wesley Sutton; **Special teams**: 50 Louis-Philippe Bourassa LS; 70 Sam Clark P; 15 David Côté K; 72 Jose Maltos K; 36 Joseph Zema P; **Suspended**: 0 Shawn Lemon DE |
Italics indicate American player • **Bold** indicates Global player • 74 Roster, 1 Suspended; Roster updated 2025-02-20 • Depth chart • Transactions • More CFL rosters

=== Ottawa Redblacks ===
Ottawa Redblacks roster
| **Quarterbacks**: 7 Tyrie Adams; 3 Dru Brown; 18 Dustin Crum; -- Matthew Shiltz; **Receivers**: 0 Bralon Addison; -- Ayir Asante; 17 DeVonte Dedmon WR/KR; 86 Maurice Ffrench; 2 Justin Hardy; -- Latreal Jones; 87 Eugene Lewis; 84 Nick Mardner; 88 Andre Miller; -- Jeremy Murphy; 83 Kalil Pimpleton; -- Darius Simmons; 80 Eli Stove; -- Kahtero Summers; 82 Lincoln Victor | **Running backs**: -- Daniel Adeboboye; -- William Stanback; 1 Devonte Williams; **Fullbacks**: 89 Marco Dubois; 45 Anthony Gosselin; **Offensive linemen**: 65 Dariusz Bladek; 64 Dino Boyd; 50 Dontae Bull; 61 Drew Desjarlais; -- Peter Godber; -- Cooper Hamilton; 63 Darta Lee; 52 Zack Pelehos; -- Kendrick Sartor; 68 Eric Starczala; 54 Jacob Ruby | **Defensive linemen**: -- Christian Albright; 95 Ronheen Bingham; 58 Bryce Carter; -- Jake Heimlicher; -- Darius Hodges; 93 Aidan John; -- Deionte Knight; 90 Cleyon Laing; -- Sam Latham; 94 Lorenzo Mauldin; -- Chase McGowan; 92 Daniel Okpoko; 99 Kene Onyeka; 47 Nigel Romick; 51 Blessman Ta'ala; 96 Michael Wakefield; **Linebackers**: -- Cam Bright; 19 Lucas Cormier; 28 Frankie Griffin; 42 James Peter; 30 Dawson Pierre; -- Robert Priester; 5 Jovan Santos-Knox; 43 Davion Taylor; 46 Tyron Vrede | **Defensive backs**: 20 Alonzo Addae; -- Tunde Adeleke; 36 C. J. Coldon; -- Clay Fields III; 22 Adrian Frye; -- Rod'Darius Gattison; 24 Yani Gouadfel; -- Demarcus Governor; 41 Tobias Harris; -- Amari Henderson; -- Gavin Heslop; 4 Monshadrik Hunter; 21 Justin Howell; -- Craig James; 38 Deandre Lamont; -- Nafees Lyon; 29 Alijah McGhee; 6 Adarius Pickett; -- Kenyon Reed; 14 Bennett Williams; **Special teams**: 53 Peter Adjey LS; -- Noah Gettman P; 13 Richie Leone K; 10 Lewis Ward K |
Italics indicate American player • **Bold** indicates Global player • 84 Roster; Roster updated 2025-02-19 • Depth chart • Transactions • More CFL rosters

=== Toronto Argonauts ===
Toronto Argonauts roster
| **Quarterbacks**: 4 Nick Arbuckle; 11 Cameron Dukes; 12 Chad Kelly; **Receivers**: 18 Dejon Brissett; 86 Damonte Coxie; 80 DaVaris Daniels; -- Dontay Demus; 3 Janarion Grant WR/KR; 87 Jake Herslow; -- Bruno LaBelle; -- Hergy Mayala; 10 Kevin Mital; -- Mark Pope; -- Vyncint Smith; -- Calvin Turner; 83 David Ungerer | **Running backs**: -- Kevin Brown; 25 Ka'Deem Carey; 24 Deonta McMahon; -- Jyran Mitchell; -- Miyan Williams; **Fullbacks**: None; **Offensive linemen**: 51 John Bosse; 53 Darius Ciraco; -- Jean Delance; 63 Sage Doxtater; 64 Dylan Giffen; 62 Ryan Hunter; 56 George Moore; 52 Peter Nicastro; -- Justin Redd; -- Daniel Shin; 58 Anthony Vandal | **Defensive linemen**: -- Atlias Bell; -- Andre Carter; -- Andrew Chatfield; -- Demarcus Christmas; -- Bryan Cox Jr.; 98 Jalen Green; 90 Thiadric Hansen; 96 Tyson Hergott; -- Da'Marcus Johnson; -- Anthony Lanier; -- Deshawn McCarthy; -- Ifenna Onyeka; 97 Derek Parish; 92 Baptiste Pollier; -- Greg Reaves; -- Daymond Williams; 95 Jordan Williams; **Linebackers**: 45 Jack Cassar; 35 Isaac Darkangelo; -- Celestin Haba; 26 Brian Harelimana; -- Brian Holloway; -- Cameron Judge; 49 Daniel Kwamou; -- Jarrett Martin; 48 Wynton McManis; -- Donald Rutledge; -- Billy Shaeffer; -- Stephen Smith; -- Ryder Varga | **Defensive backs**: 0 Tyshon Blackburn; -- Darrius Bratton; 41 Jonathan Edouard; -- Ciante Evans; 23 Benjie Franklin; 33 Kenneth George Jr.; -- Lawrence Johnson; 20 Quincy Mauger; 2 Tarvarus McFadden; 27 Mark Milton; -- Jai Nunn-Liddell; -- Anthony Sao; 82 Derek Slywka; -- Will Sunderland; -- Armani Watts; **Special teams**: 46 Simon Chaves LS; 72 Jeremy Edwards P; 71 Alfredo Gachuz Lozada K; 47 Adam Guillemette LS; 70 Lirim Hajrullahu K |
Italics indicate American player • **Bold** indicates Global player • 87 Roster; Roster updated 2025-03-01 • Depth chart • Transactions (argonauts.ca) • Transactions (cfl.ca) • More CFL rosters
