= 2024 Saskatchewan Roughriders season =

CFL team season

- General manager: Jeremy O'Day
- President: Craig Reynolds
- Head coach: Corey Mace
- Home stadium: Mosaic Stadium

Results
- Record: 9–8–1
- Division place: 2nd, West
- Playoffs: Lost West Final
- Team MOP: Rolan Milligan Jr.
- Team MODP: Rolan Milligan Jr.
- Team MOC: Samuel Emilus
- Team MOOL: Logan Ferland
- Team MOST: Rolan Milligan Jr.
- Team MOR: Trevor Reid

Uniform
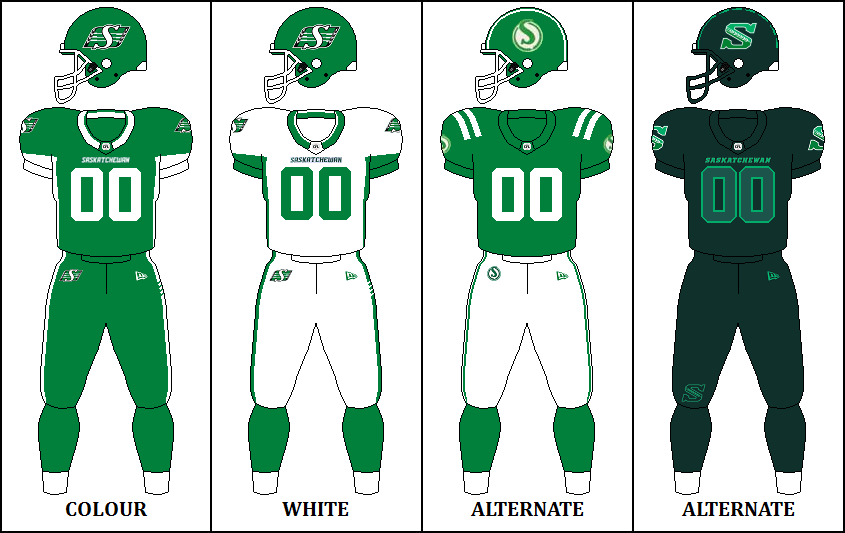

The 2024 Saskatchewan Roughriders season was the 66th season for the team in the Canadian Football League (CFL). It was the club's 115th year overall, and its 108th season of play. The Roughriders qualified for the playoffs for the first time since 2021 following their week 18 win over the Edmonton Elks. However, the team lost to the Winnipeg Blue Bombers in the West Final.

The 2024 CFL season was the fifth season under general manager Jeremy O'Day, following his extension announcement on October 23, 2023. This was the first season under head coach, Corey Mace, after the team's previous head coach, Craig Dickenson, did not have his contract renewed.

The Saskatchewan Roughriders drew an average home attendance of 27,684 in 2024.

== Offseason ==
=== CFL global draft ===
The 2024 CFL global draft took place on April 30, 2024. The Roughriders had two picks in the draft, selecting third in each round.

Round	Pick	Player	Position	Club/School	Nationality
1	3	Tyrone Taleni	DL	Southern California	Samoa
2	12	Jordy Sandy	P	Texas Christian	Australia

== CFL national draft ==
The 2024 CFL draft took place on April 30, 2024. The Roughriders had eight selections in the eight-round draft. Not including traded picks, the team selected third in each round of the draft after finishing third-last in the 2023 league standings.

Round	Pick	Player	Position	University Team	Hometown
1	3	Kyle Hergel	OL	Boston College	Toronto, ON
2	12	Nick Wiebe	LB	Saskatchewan	Calgary, AB
3	23	Dhel Duncan-Busby	WR	Bemidji State	Madison, OH
4	32	Melique Straker	LB	Arkansas State	Brampton, ON
5	41	Daniel Johnson	OL	Purdue	London, ON
6	50	D'Sean Mimbs	WR	Regina	Regina, SK
7	59	Ajou Ajou	WR	South Florida	Brooks, AB
8	68	Richard Aduboffour	DB	Western Ontario	Toronto, ON

== Preseason ==
Week	Game	Date	Kickoff	Opponent	Results		TV	Venue	Attendance	Summary
Week	Game	Date	Kickoff	Opponent	Score	Record	TV	Venue	Attendance	Summary
A	1	Mon, May 20	2:00 p.m. CST	vs. Winnipeg Blue Bombers	W 25–12	1–0	CFL+	Mosaic Stadium	N/A	Recap
B	2	Sat, May 25	2:00 p.m. CST	at Edmonton Elks	W 28–27	2–0	CFL+	Commonwealth Stadium	N/A	Recap
C	Bye									

# Games played with white uniforms.

== Regular season ==
=== Standings ===
West Division
Team	GP	W	L	T	Pts	PF	PA	Div	Stk	
Winnipeg Blue Bombers	18	11	7	0	22	447	365	7–3	W1	Details
Saskatchewan Roughriders	18	9	8	1	19	478	434	5–5	L1	Details
BC Lions	18	9	9	0	18	448	439	5–5	W1	Details
Edmonton Elks	18	7	11	0	14	494	500	5–5	W2	Details
Calgary Stampeders	18	5	12	1	11	427	510	3–7	W1	Details

=== Schedule ===
Week	Game	Date	Kickoff	Opponent	Results		TV	Venue	Attendance	Summary
Week	Game	Date	Kickoff	Opponent	Score	Record	TV	Venue	Attendance	Summary
1	1	Sat, June 8	2:00 p.m. CST ^{1}	at Edmonton Elks	W 29–21	1–0	TSN/CBSSN	Commonwealth Stadium	20,681	Recap
2	2	Sun, June 16	5:00 p.m. CST	at Hamilton Tiger-Cats	W 33–30	2–0	TSN/CBSSN	Tim Hortons Field	22,313	Recap
3	3	Sun, June 23	5:00 p.m. CST	vs. Hamilton Tiger-Cats	W 36–20	3–0	TSN/CBSSN	Mosaic Stadium	24,875	Recap
4	Bye									
5	ǁ 4 ǁ	Thu, July 4	7:00 p.m. CST	vs. Toronto Argonauts	W 30–23	4–0	TSN	Mosaic Stadium	23,923	Recap
6	5	Sat, July 13	5:00 p.m. CST	at BC Lions	L 20–35	4–1	TSN/CBSSN	BC Place	30,803	Recap
7	6	Fri, July 19	7:30 p.m. CST	vs. Winnipeg Blue Bombers	W 19–9	5–1	TSN	Mosaic Stadium	29,649	Recap
8	7	Thu, July 25	5:30 p.m. CST	at Montreal Alouettes	L 16–20	5–2	TSN/RDS	Molson Stadium	19,653	Recap
9	8	Sat, Aug 3	5:00 p.m. CST	vs. Edmonton Elks	L 31–42	5–3	TSN/CBSSN	Mosaic Stadium	29,655	Recap
10	9	Thu, Aug 8	5:30 p.m. CST	at Ottawa Redblacks	T 22–22 (2OT)	5–3–1	TSN/RDS	TD Place Stadium	17,180	Recap
11	10	Fri, Aug 16	7:00 p.m. CST	vs. Montreal Alouettes	L 24–27	5–4–1	TSN/RDS/CBSSN	Mosaic Stadium	28,123	Recap
12	11	Thu, Aug 22	5:30 p.m. CST	at Toronto Argonauts	L 19–20	5–5–1	TSN/RDS	BMO Field	19,327	Recap
13	ǁ 12 ǁ	Sun, Sep 1	5:00 p.m. CST	vs. Winnipeg Blue Bombers	L 33–35	5–6–1	TSN/CBSSN	Mosaic Stadium	33,861	Recap
14	13	Sat, Sept 7	1:00 p.m. CST	at Winnipeg Blue Bombers	L 21–26	5–7–1	CTV	Princess Auto Stadium	32,343	Recap
15	Bye									
16	14	Fri, Sept 20	7:30 p.m. CST	at Calgary Stampeders	W 37–29	6–7–1	TSN	McMahon Stadium	24,240	Recap
17	15	Sat, Sep 28	1:00 p.m. CST	vs. Ottawa Redblacks	W 29–16	7–7–1	CTV	Mosaic Stadium	27,676	Recap
18	16	Sat, Oct 5	5:00 p.m. CST	at Edmonton Elks	W 28–24	8–7–1	TSN	Commonwealth Stadium	24,317	Recap
19	17	Sat, Oct 12	5:00 p.m. CST	vs. BC Lions	W 39–8	9–7–1	TSN	Mosaic Stadium	28,683	Recap
20	Bye									
21	18	Sat, Oct 26	5:00 p.m. CST	vs. Calgary Stampeders	L 12–27	9–8–1	TSN	Mosaic Stadium	22,709	Recap

Notes

1. Week 1 vs Edmonton was originally scheduled for 5:00 pm CST but was pushed up to 2:00 pm CST to avoid conflict with game 1 of the 2024 Stanley Cup Final involving the Edmonton Oilers at 6:00 pm CST.

# Games played with primary home uniforms.
# Games played with white uniforms.
ǁ # ǁ Games played with retro alternate uniforms.
# Games played with obsidian alternate uniforms.

== Post-season ==
=== Schedule ===
Game	Date	Kickoff	Opponent	Results		TV	Venue	Attendance	Summary
Game	Date	Kickoff	Opponent	Score	Record	TV	Venue	Attendance	Summary
West Semi-Final	Sat, Nov 2	4:30 p.m. CST	vs. BC Lions	W 28–19	1–0	TSN/RDS	Mosaic Stadium	26,125	Recap
West Final	Sat, Nov 9	5:30 p.m. CST	at Winnipeg Blue Bombers	L 22–38	1–1	TSN/RDS	Princess Auto Stadium	32,343	Recap

# Games played with obsidian alternate uniforms.
# Games played with white uniforms.

== Roster ==
2024 Saskatchewan Roughriders final roster
**Quarterbacks**: 14 Jack Coan; 7 Trevor Harris; 5 Shea Patterson; **Running backs**: 29 Ryquell Armstead; 41 Albert Awachie; 45 A. J. Ouellette; **Receivers**: 2 Mario Alford; 18 Dhel Duncan-Busby; 19 Samuel Emilus; 3 KeeSean Johnson; 81 Mitchell Picton; 89 Kian Schaffer-Baker; 83 Jerreth Sterns	**Offensive linemen**: 66 Jacob Brammer G/T; 63 Logan Ferland G/C/T; 67 Zack Fry G/C; 51 Peter Godber C; 54 Ryan Sceviour G/C; 64 Trevon Tate T; **Defensive linemen**: 95 Habakkuk Baldonado DE; 90 Miles Brown DT; 11 Malik Carney DE; 50 Bryan Cox Jr. DE; 4 Micah Johnson DT; 91 Anthony Lanier DT/DE; 93 Benoit Marion DE; 92 Caleb Sanders DT	**Linebackers**: 32 A. J. Allen; 35 C. J. Avery; 42 Adam Auclair; 48 Jordan Herdman-Reed; 58 Justin Herdman-Reed; 28 Melique Straker; 6 Jameer Thurman; **Defensive backs**: 38 Jayden Dalke; 22 DaMarcus Fields; 16 Amari Henderson; 21 Nelson Lokombo; 0 Rolan Milligan; 26 Godfrey Onyeka; 1 C. J. Reavis; 8 Marcus Sayles	**Special teams**: 46 Jorgen Hus LS; 12 Brett Lauther K; 10 Kaare Vedvik P; **Practice roster**: 94 Eric Black DE; 33 Antoine Brooks DB; 76 Joe Couch P; 65 Daniel Johnson T; 62 Nick Jones G/T; 87 Bruno LaBelle FB; 57 David Murray G; 59 Braydon Noll C; 77 Zachary Philion LB; 25 Clint Ratkovich FB; 78 Stephen Smith LB	**Injured list**: 80 Ajou Ajou SB; 97 Christian Albright DE; 15 Shawn Bane WR; 30 Thomas Bertrand-Hudon RB; 53 Philip Blake G; 99 Charbel Dabire DT; 17 Jaxon Ford DB; 52 Jermarcus Hardrick T; 20 Frankie Hickson RB; 85 Colton Hunchak SB; 49 Lake Korte-Moore DE; 88 Dohnte Meyers WR; 47 Aubrey Miller LB; 31 Kosi Onyeka DB; 61 Trevor Reid T; 82 Joe Robustelli WR; 43 Nick Wiebe LB; 24 Deontai Williams DB; 68 Noah Zerr G	**Suspended list**: D'Mitri Emmanuel G; Jerald Hawkins T; Jonathan Hubbard T; Sadarius Hutcherson G; Dazz Newsome WR
Italics indicate American player • **Bold** indicates Globel player

== Coaching staff ==
Saskatchewan Roughriders staff
Front office: President and CEO – Craig Reynolds; General Manager and Vice President of Football Operations – Jeremy O'Day; Assistant General Manager – Paul Jones; Assistant General Manager – Kyle Carson; Director of Football Operations – Jordan Greenly; Head Athletic Therapist – Greg Mayer; Manager of Equipment – Gordon Gilroy; Head Coaches: Head Coach/Defensive Coordinator – Corey Mace; Offensive coaches: Offensive Coordinator – Marc Mueller; Offensive Line – Edwin Harrison; Receivers – Marquay McDaniel; Running Backs – Anthony Vitale	Defensive coaches: Pass Game Coordinator and Defensive Backs – Josh Bell; Defensive Line – Phillip Daniels; Run Game Coordinator and Linebackers – J. C. Sherritt; Defensive Assistant – Jordan Linnen; Special teams coaches: Special Teams Coordinator – Kent Maugeri; Special Teams Assistant – Jeff Higgins; Strength and conditioning: Head of Strength and Conditioning – Dan Farthing; → Coaching staff
