= Melique =

Melique is a masculine given name. Notable people with the name include:

- Melique García (born 1992), Honduran sprinter
- Melique Straker (born 2000), Canadian football linebacker
