= Arku =

Arku is a name. Notable people with the name include:

- Kobina Arku Korsah (1894–1967), first Chief Justice of Ghana
- Geoffrey Cantin-Arku (born 1998), Canadian football player
