= Majette =

Majette is a surname. Notable people with the surname include:

- Denise Majette (born 1955), American politician
- Tiffany Majette, known as Orion Sun, American singer, songwriter, multi-instrumentalist and producer
- Theo Majette, member of Calgary Stampeders Canadian Football roster
