= Jake Gaudaur Veterans' Trophy =

The Jake Gaudaur Veterans' Trophy is presented annually to the Canadian Football League (CFL) player " who best demonstrates the attributes of Canada's veterans in times of war, peace and military conflict." The award was first presented in 2010, and the first recipient was Mike McCullough of the Saskatchewan Roughriders.

The award is presented by the CFL and Veterans Affairs Canada to jointly recognize the contributions of Gaudaur and the sacrifices of Canada's military veterans. Jake Gaudaur, the award's namesake, served as CFL Commissioner from 1968 until 1984, after playing for the Toronto Argonauts, Hamilton Tiger-Cats and Montreal Alouettes. He served as a pilot in the Royal Canadian Air Force during World War II.

As with other CFL awards, the Jake Gaudaur Veterans' Trophy is presented during Grey Cup week. For the inaugural award, current Minister of Veterans Affairs Jean-Pierre Blackburn was on hand to present the trophy to McCullough. The Jake Gaudaur Veterans' Trophy was established as part of the CFL's 2010 Veterans Tribute, a series of activities organized by the league to commemorate "the achievements and sacrifices of Canadian Veterans during times of war, military conflict and peace."

The judges involved in selecting the winner for the Jake Gaudaur Veterans' Trophy in 2010 included CFL Commissioner Mark Cohon, broadcaster Glen Suitor, CFL Players Association president Stu Laird, Dominion Treasurer of the Royal Canadian Legion Michael Cook and Assistant Deputy Minister for Service Delivery and Commemoration, Veterans Affairs Canada Keith Hillier. The judges selected McCullough based on his perseverance, comradeship, community service, strength and courage.

== Jake Gaudaur Veterans' Trophy winners ==
- 2026 – Geoffrey Cantin-Arku (LB), Montreal Alouettes
- 2025 – Logan Ferland (OL), Saskatchewan Roughriders
- 2024 – Jorgen Hus (LS), Saskatchewan Roughriders
- 2023 – Brayden Lenius (REC), Saskatchewan Roughriders
- 2022 – Dan Clark (C), Saskatchewan Roughriders
- 2021 – Chris Van Zeyl (OT), Hamilton Tiger-Cats
- 2020 – season cancelled – COVID-19
- 2019 – Martin Bédard (LS), Montreal Alouettes
- 2018 – Rolly Lumbala (FB) BC Lions
- 2017 – Luc Brodeur-Jourdain (C), Montreal Alouettes
- 2016 – Matt Black (DB), Toronto Argonauts
- 2015 – Jeff Perrett (OT), Montreal Alouettes
- 2014 – James Yurichuk (LB), Toronto Argonauts
- 2013 – Shea Emry (LB), Montreal Alouettes
- 2012 – Graeme Bell (FB) – Saskatchewan Roughriders
- 2011 – Andre Durie (RB/SB), Toronto Argonauts
- 2010 – Mike McCullogh (LB), Saskatchewan Roughriders
