= Ben Labrosse =

Canadian gridiron football player (born 1999)

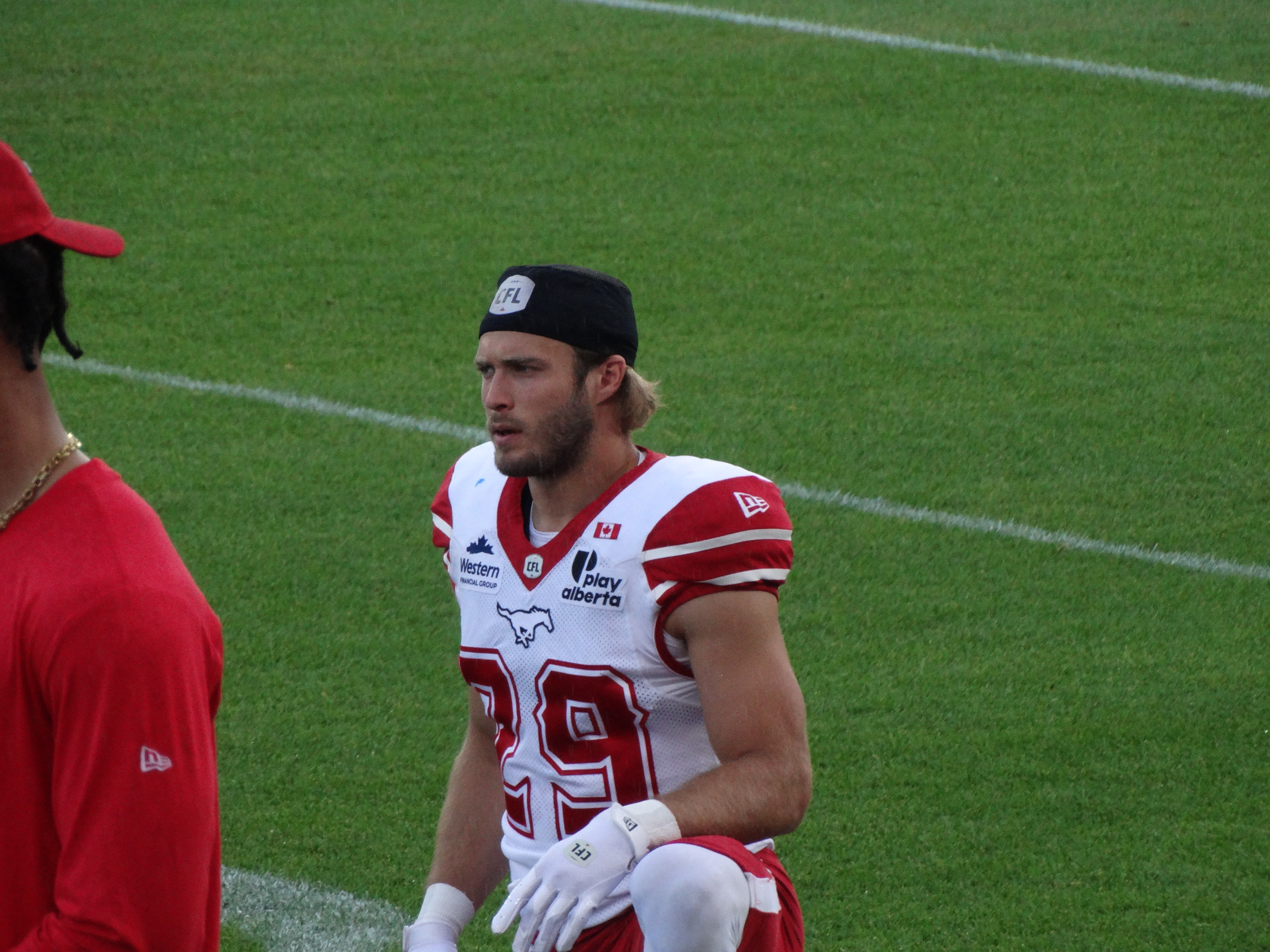
- Labrosse with the Calgary Stampeders in 2026

No. 29 – Calgary Stampeders
- Position: Defensive back
- Roster status: Active
- CFL status: National

Personal information
- Born: October 18, 1999 (age 27); Montreal, Quebec, Canada
- Listed height: 6 ft 0 in (1.83 m)
- Listed weight: 194 lb (88 kg)

Career information
- College: Syracuse
- University: McGill
- CFL draft: 2024: 1st round, 4th overall pick

Career history
- 2024–present: Calgary Stampeders

Awards and highlights
- All-Canadian (2022)
- Stats at CFL.ca

Benjamin Labrosse (born October 18, 1999) is a Canadian professional football defensive back for the Calgary Stampeders of the Canadian Football League (CFL). He played college football at Syracuse and U Sports football at McGill.

== Early life ==
Labrosse was born in Montreal. He played three seasons of CEGEP football at Vanier College, recording 124.5 tackles and 11 interceptions. He was a three-time RSEQ all-star.

== College career ==
Labrosse played college football for the Syracuse Orange from 2020 to 2021. He played in nine games in 2020 and made 11 tackles. He started the first game of the 2021 season, splitting time with Jason Simmons, before leaving Syracuse. Labrosse stated he left due to a lack of playing time.

Labrosse played U Sports football for the McGill Redbirds in 2022, recording 29 tackles and three interception while earning All-Canadian honors. He did not play for the Redbirds in 2023 after being ruled academically ineligible.

== Professional career ==
Pre-draft measurables
Height	Weight	40-yard dash	20-yard shuttle	Three-cone drill	Vertical jump	Broad jump	Bench press
6 ft 0 in (1.83 m)	189 lb (86 kg)	4.51 s	4.21 s	6.76 s	38.5 in (0.98 m)	11 ft 1 3/4 in (3.40 m)	12 reps
All values from CFL Combine

At the 2024 CFL Combine, Labrosse tied for first in the 40-yard dash (4.51 seconds) with Michael Chris-Ike. Labrosse also finished first in the broad jump (11′ 1 3/4″).

In April 2024, Labrosse was selected by the Calgary Stampeders of the Canadian Football League (CFL) with the fourth overall pick in the 2024 CFL draft. In May, he attended rookie minicamp with the New York Giants of the National Football League on a tryout basis. Thereafter, he officially signed with the Stampeders on May 13, 2024.

Following training camp in 2024, Labrosse made the team's active roster and made his professional debut on June 8, 2024, against the Hamilton Tiger-Cats where he had one special teams tackle. He was placed on the 6-game injured list on July 11, 2024, but returned to play in the team's week 8 game against Ottawa. He recorded a career-high eight defensive tackles on September 21, 2024, against the Saskatchewan Roughriders. He played in 14 regular season games where he had 34 defensive tackles and two special teams tackles.
