= Ajou Ajou =

Canadian gridiron football player (born 2002)

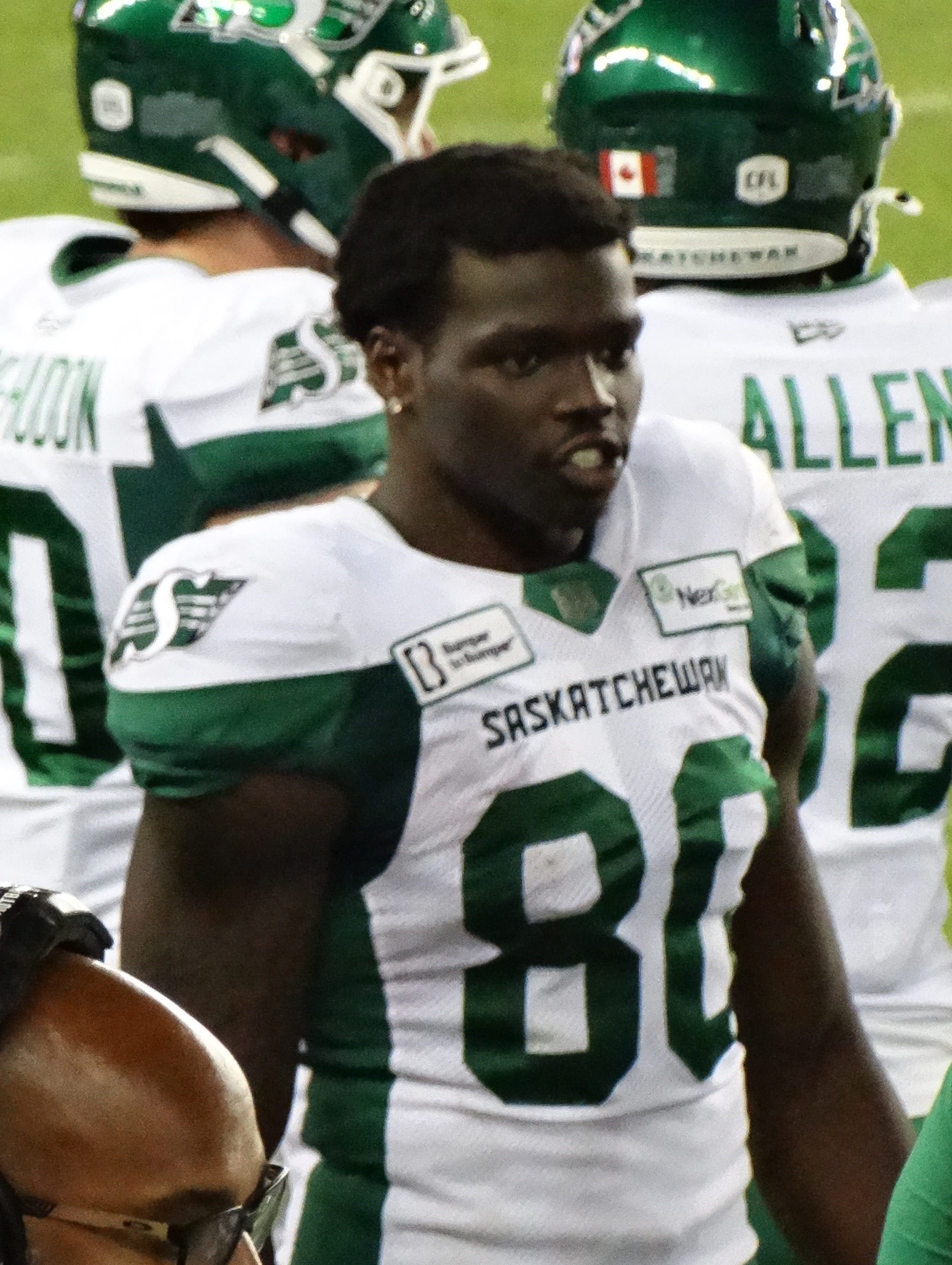
- Ajou with the Saskatchewan Roughriders in 2024

No. 89 – Calgary Stampeders
- Position: Wide receiver
- Roster status: Active
- CFL status: National

Personal information
- Born: January 10, 2002 (age 24); Brooks, Alberta, Canada
- Listed height: 6 ft 2 in (1.88 m)
- Listed weight: 218 lb (99 kg)

Career information
- High school: Clearwater Academy International (Clearwater, Florida, U.S.)
- College: Clemson (2020–2021); South Florida (2022); Garden City (2023)
- NFL draft: 2024: undrafted
- CFL draft: 2024: 7th round, 59th overall pick

Career history
- Saskatchewan Roughriders (2024); Indianapolis Colts (2025)*; Saskatchewan Roughriders (2025); Calgary Stampeders (2026–present)
- * Offseason or practice squad member only

Awards and highlights
- Grey Cup champion (2025)

Career CFL statistics as of 2026
- Games played: 24
- Receptions: 47
- Receiving yards: 570
- Receiving touchdowns: 4
- Stats at CFL.ca
- Stats at Pro Football Reference

Ajou Ajou (born January 10, 2002) is a Canadian professional football wide receiver for the Calgary Stampeders of the Canadian Football League (CFL). He last played for the Saskatchewan Roughriders of the Canadian Football League (CFL). He played college football for the Clemson Tigers, South Florida Bulls, and Garden City Broncbusters.

== College career ==
Ajou first played college football with the Clemson Tigers from 2020 to 2021, becoming the first Canadian to play for the team. He played in 22 games where he had eight catches for 114 yards and one touchdown. While wanting more playing time, Ajou transferred to the University of South Florida in 2022 to play for the Bulls. However, after recording two receptions for nine yards in the first game of the season, he suffered a sports hernia and sat out the rest of the season. After returning to health in 2023, he was denied a spot on the team, so he transferred to Garden City Community College to play for the Broncbusters. He then played in seven games where he had 17 catches for 186 yards and two touchdowns. Following the 2023 season, he declared for the CFL draft and NFL draft.

== Professional career ==
Pre-draft measurables
Height	Weight	40-yard dash	20-yard shuttle	Three-cone drill	Vertical jump	Broad jump	Bench press
6 ft 2 in (1.88 m)	211 lb (96 kg)	4.85 s	4.43 s	7.01 s	34.0 in (0.86 m)	10 ft 5 3/4 in (3.19 m)	12 reps
All values from CFL Combine

=== Saskatchewan Roughriders (first stint) ===
Ajou was selected in the seventh round, 59th overall, in the 2024 CFL draft by the Saskatchewan Roughriders and signed with the team on May 6, 2024. Following training camp in 2024, he began the season on the team's injured list. However, he soon after made his professional debut in week 2 on June 16, 2024, against the Hamilton Tiger-Cats where he had five receptions for 41 yards. In the team's next game, also against the Tiger-Cats, on June 23, 2024, Ajou scored his first career touchdown on a 40-yard pass from Trevor Harris. He became the first seventh-round draft pick to score a touchdown in franchise history.

Ajou recorded his first 100-yard game on July 19, 2024, against the Winnipeg Blue Bombers, when he recorded four catches for 110 yards, all in the second half, in a relief performance for the injured Kian Schaffer-Baker. He played in 12 regular season games in his rookie year where he recorded 20 receptions for 307 yards and two touchdowns. He was transferred to the six-game injured list on September 27, 2024, where he finished the year and did not appear in the team's two post-season games.

On January 22, 2025, Ajou was released by the Roughriders to pursue opportunities in the National Football League.

=== Indianapolis Colts ===
On January 24, 2025, Ajou signed a reserve/futures contract with the Indianapolis Colts. He was waived on August 26 as part of final roster cuts.

=== Saskatchewan Roughriders (second stint) ===
On August 28, 2025, Ajou re-signed with the Saskatchewan Roughriders. He played in eight regular season games where he had 22 receptions for 212 yards. He did not dress in the West Final, but he played in the 112th Grey Cup where he had two receptions for 13 yards in the team's 25–17 victory over the Montreal Alouettes.

On April 16, 2026, Ajou was released by the Roughriders after receiving a minimum six-game suspension by the CFL for violating the league's gender-based violence policy.

=== Calgary Stampeders ===
On June 30, 2026, shortly after being reinstated by the CFL, Ajou signed with the Calgary Stampeders.

== Personal life ==
Ajou was raised in Brooks, Alberta by his mother who immigrated from South Sudan.
