= Luke Brubacher =

Canadian former football player (born 2000)

No. 98
- Position: Defensive lineman

Personal information
- Born: October 4, 2000 (age 26); Listowel, Ontario, Canada
- Listed height: 6 ft 5 in (1.96 m)
- Listed weight: 246 lb (112 kg)

Career information
- University: Wilfrid Laurier
- CFL draft: 2024: 2nd round, 16th overall pick

Career history
- 2024–2025: Hamilton Tiger-Cats

Awards and highlights
- OUA second-team All-Star (2023)
- Stats at CFL.ca

Luke Brubacher (born October 4, 2000) is a Canadian former professional football defensive lineman who played for the Hamilton Tiger-Cats of the Canadian Football League (CFL). He played U Sports football at Wilfrid Laurier.

== Early life ==
Brubacher grew up in Listowel, Ontario, but his high school did not have a football team. He instead spent time competing as an amateur boxer and had an 8–0 record.

== University career ==
Brubacher attended Wilfrid Laurier University for a year and a half as a kinesiology student before emailing head football coach Michael Faulds to ask for a tryout, despite never having played organized football before. Brubacher joined the team in 2020 but the U Sports football season was cancelled due to the COVID-19 pandemic. He played in seven games in 2021, recording 10 solo tackles, 13 assisted tackles, and 4.5 sacks. He appeared in 10 games during the 2022 season, totaling 15 solo tackles, 24 assisted tackles, 1.5 sacks, two pass breakups and one forced fumble. Brubacher played in 10 games in 2023, accumulating 12 solo tackles, 13 assisted tackles, six sacks, and two pass breakups, earning OUA second-team All-Star honors.

== Professional career ==
Pre-draft measurables
Height	Weight	40-yard dash	20-yard shuttle	Three-cone drill	Vertical jump	Broad jump
6 ft 5 1/4 in (1.96 m)	246 lb (112 kg)	4.69 s	4.34 s	7.06 s	38.0 in (0.97 m)	10 ft 6 in (3.20 m)
All values from CFL Combine

Brubacher was selected by the Hamilton Tiger-Cats of the Canadian Football League (CFL) in the second round, with the 16th overall pick, of the 2024 CFL draft. He also attended rookie minicamp with both the New York Jets and New Orleans Saints on a tryout basis. He officially signed with the Tiger-Cats on May 13, 2024. Brubacher was placed on the six-game injured list on June 14, placed on the one-game injured list on August 1, activated from the injured list on August 9, placed on the one-game injured list again on September 1, activated off of the injured list again on September 13, and placed on the six-game injured list for the second time on September 19, 2024. He dressed in four games overall during the 2024 season as a reserve defensive end, posting two tackles on defense.

Brubacher was placed on the six-game injured list again on May 27, 2025, and ended up missing the entire 2025 season. On May 1, 2026, he announced his retirement from professional football.
