= Christy Nkanu =

Canadian football player (born 1998)

- Nkanu with the Calgary Stampeders in 2024

No. 65 – Calgary Stampeders
- Position: Offensive lineman
- Roster status: Active
- CFL status: National

Personal information
- Born: October 23, 1998 (age 28); Montreal, Quebec, Canada
- Listed height: 6 ft 2 in (1.88 m)
- Listed weight: 325 lb (147 kg)

Career information
- High school: Dalbe-Viau (Lachine, QC); St. Paul (Santa Fe Springs, CA)
- College: Southern Utah (2018–2022); Washington State (2023)
- CFL draft: 2024: 1st round, 8th overall pick

Career history
- 2024–present: Calgary Stampeders

Awards and highlights
- CFL West All-Star (2026); First-team All-WAC (2022)
- Stats at CFL.ca

Christy Nkanu (born October 23, 1998) is a Canadian professional football offensive lineman for the Calgary Stampeders of the Canadian Football League (CFL). He played college football at Southern Utah and Washington State.

== Early life ==
Nkanu was born in Montreal, Quebec. He attended Dalbé-Viau High School in Lachine, Quebec and St. Paul High School in Santa Fe Springs, California.

== College career ==
Nkanu first played college football for the Southern Utah Thunderbirds from 2019 to 2022. He was redshirted in 2018. He played in two games in 2019. The 2020 season was moved to spring 2021 due to the COVID-19 pandemic, and Nkanu appeared in two games. He played in nine games for the Thunderbirds during the fall 2021 season. He played in 12 games, starting eight, during his final season at Souhthern Utah in 2022, earning first team All-Western Athletic Conference honors.

Nkanu transferred to play for the Washington State Cougars in 2023, and appeared in four games that year.

== Professional career ==
Pre-draft measurables
Height	Weight	Arm length	Hand span	Wingspan	40-yard dash	10-yard split	20-yard split	Bench press
6 ft 2 1/2 in (1.89 m)	310 lb (141 kg)	33 in (0.84 m)	10 1/4 in (0.26 m)	6 ft 8 1/2 in (2.04 m)	5.35 s	1.84 s	3.11 s	19 reps
All values from Pro Day

Nkanu was selected by the Calgary Stampeders of the Canadian Football League (CFL) in the first round, with the eighth overall pick, of the 2024 CFL draft. He officially signed with the team on May 3, 2024.
