= 2024 CFL draft =

Canadian football draft

General information
- Sport: Canadian football
- Date: April 30, 2024
- Time: 8:00 pm EDT
- Location: Toronto, Ontario
- Networks: TSN, RDS, TSN+

Overview
- 74 total selections in 8 rounds
- League: CFL
- First selection: Joel Dublanko, Edmonton Elks
- Mr. Irrelevant: Vincent Delisle
- Most selections (10): Winnipeg Blue Bombers
- Fewest selections (7): Ottawa Redblacks; Montreal Alouettes
- U Sports selections: 47
- NCAA selections: 27

The 2024 CFL national draft was a selection of national players by Canadian Football League teams that took place on April 30, 2024 at 8:00 pm ET. 74 players were chosen from among eligible players from Canadian Universities across the country, as well as Canadian players playing in the NCAA and NAIA.

== Format changes ==
As per the 2022 collective bargaining agreement, beginning with this year's draft, the two teams that had National players featured in the highest percentage of snaps played in the 2023 CFL season were each awarded an additional second-round pick. Because of this change, there will no longer be second-round territorial selections for the two worst teams from the previous season.

== Top prospects ==
Source: CFL Scouting Bureau rankings.

Final ranking	January ranking	August ranking	Player	Position	University	Hometown
1	1	5	Isaiah Adams	Offensive lineman	Illinois	Ajax, ON
2	3	–	Theo Johnson	Tight end	Pennsylvania State	Windsor, ON
3	4	12	Tanner McLachlan	Tight end	Arizona	Lethbridge, AB
4	5	4	Kyle Hergel	Offensive lineman	Boston College	Toronto, ON
5	2	3	Theo Benedet	Offensive lineman	British Columbia	North Vancouver, BC
6	–	–	Joel Dublanko	Linebacker	Cincinnati	Aberdeen, WA
7	11	6	Nick Mardner	Wide receiver	Auburn	Oakville, ON
8	9	8	Giovanni Manu	Offensive lineman	British Columbia	Pitt Meadows, BC
9	7	10	Geoffrey Cantin-Arku	Linebacker	Memphis	Lévis, QC
10	20	–	Kevin Mital	Wide receiver	Laval	Saint-Hubert, QC
11	8	11	Anim Dankwah	Offensive lineman	Howard	Toronto, ON
12	6	2	Gabe Wallace	Offensive lineman	Buffalo	Salmon Arm, BC
13	15	–	Daniel Okpoko	Defensive lineman	San Diego State	Saskatoon, SK
14	18	–	Nathaniel Dumoulin-Duguay	Offensive lineman	Laval	Rimouski, QC
15	16	13	Christy Nkanu	Offensive lineman	Washington State	Montreal, QC
16	12	7	Daniel Johnson	Offensive lineman	Purdue	London, ON
17	10	14	Melique Straker	Linebacker	Arkansas State	Brampton, ON
18	13	19	Dhel Duncan-Busby	Wide receiver	Bemidji State	Madison, OH
19	–	–	Luke Brubacher	Defensive lineman	Wilfrid Laurier	Listowel, ON
20	–	–	Kevens Clercius	Wide receiver	Connecticut	Montreal, QC
–	14	9	Justin Sambu	Defensive lineman	Baylor	Calgary, AB
–	17	16	Ajou Ajou	Wide receiver	Garden City	Brooks, AB
–	19	18	Kail Dava	Defensive lineman	Tennessee Tech	Mississauga, ON
–	–	1	Kurtis Rourke (Note: Rourke and Schon deferred their draft years to 2025.)	Quarterback	Ohio	Oakville, ON
–	–	15	Nick Wiebe	Linebacker	Saskatchewan	Okotoks, AB
–	–	17	John Bosse	Offensive lineman	Calgary	Calgary, AB
–	–	20	Eric Schon	Offensive lineman	Holy Cross	Barrie, ON

== Draft order ==
=== Round one ===
Pick #	CFL team	Player	Position	University
1	Edmonton Elks	Joel Dublanko	LB	Cincinnati
2	Ottawa Redblacks	Nick Mardner	WR	Auburn
3	Saskatchewan Roughriders	Kyle Hergel	OL	Boston College
4	Calgary Stampeders	Benjamin Labrosse	DB	McGill
5	Toronto Argonauts (via Hamilton)	Kevin Mital	WR	Laval
6	BC Lions	George Una	OL	Windsor
7	Hamilton Tiger-Cats (via Toronto)	Nathaniel Dumoulin-Duguay	OL	Laval
8	Calgary Stampeders (via Winnipeg)	Christy Nkanu	OL	Washington State
9	Montreal Alouettes	Geoffrey Cantin-Arku	LB	Memphis

=== Round two ===
Pick #	CFL team	Player	Position	University
10	Edmonton Elks	DK Bonhomme	LB	South Alabama
11	Ottawa Redblacks	Daniel Okpoko	DL	San Diego State
12	Saskatchewan Roughriders	Nick Wiebe	LB	Saskatchewan
13	Winnipeg Blue Bombers (via Calgary)	Kevens Clercius	WR	Connecticut
14	Winnipeg Blue Bombers (via Hamilton and Calgary)	Michael Chris-Ike	RB	Delaware State
15	BC Lions	Theo Benedet	OL	British Columbia
16	Hamilton Tiger-Cats (via Toronto)	Luke Brubacher	DL	Wilfrid Laurier
17	Winnipeg Blue Bombers	Gabe Wallace	OL	Buffalo
18	Edmonton Elks (via Montreal)	Bradley Hladik	TE	British Columbia
19N	BC Lions	Ezechiel Tieide	WR	Concordia (QC)
20N	Winnipeg Blue Bombers	Kyle Samson	DL	British Columbia

=== Round three ===
Pick #	CFL team	Player	Position	University
21	Edmonton Elks	Olivier Muembi	LB	Queen's
22	Ottawa Redblacks	Dawson Pierre	DB	Concordia (QC)
23	Saskatchewan Roughriders	Dhel Duncan-Busby	WR	Bemidji State
24	Toronto Argonauts (via Hamilton via Calgary)	Tyson Hergott	DL	Waterloo
25	Toronto Argonauts (via Hamilton)	John Bosse	OL	Calgary
26	BC Lions	Cristophe Beaulieu	DB	Laval
27	Toronto Argonauts	Tyshon Blackburn	DB	Alberta
28	Calgary Stampeders (via Winnipeg)	George Idoko	DL	Saskatchewan
29	Montreal Alouettes	Arthur Hamlin	DB	Colgate

=== Round four ===
Pick #	CFL team	Player	Position	University
30	Edmonton Elks	Jaxon Morkin	OL	Windsor
31	Edmonton Elks (via Ottawa)	Vincent Blanchard	K	Laval
32	Saskatchewan Roughriders	Melique Straker	LB	Arkansas State
33	Calgary Stampeders	Jason Janvier-Messier	DL	York (ON)
34	Hamilton Tiger-Cats	Daniel Bell	DB	Mount Allison
35	Ottawa Redblacks (via BC)	Jahquan Bloomfield	WR	Prairie View A&M
36	Hamilton Tiger-Cats (via Toronto)	Matthew Peterson	RB	Alberta
37	Winnipeg Blue Bombers	Ian Leroux	LS	Laval
38	Montreal Alouettes	Micah Roane	DL	South Dakota

=== Round five ===
Pick #	CFL team	Player	Position	University
39	Toronto Argonauts (via Edmonton)	Jerrell Cummings	DB	British Columbia
40	Winnipeg Blue Bombers (via Ottawa)	Ethan Kalra	OL	Waterloo
41	Saskatchewan Roughriders	Daniel Johnson	OL	Purdue
42	Calgary Stampeders	Paul-Antoine Ouellette	WR	Montreal
43	Hamilton Tiger-Cats	Ryan Baker	LB	British Columbia
44	BC Lions	Kail Dava	DL	Tennessee Tech
45	Toronto Argonauts	Ifenna Onyeka	DL	Carleton (ON)
46	Winnipeg Blue Bombers	Giovanni Manu	OL	British Columbia
47	Montreal Alouettes	Frederik Antoine	WR	Laval

=== Round six ===
Pick #	CFL team	Player	Position	University
48	Toronto Argonauts (via Edmonton)	Anim Dankwah	OL	Howard
49	Ottawa Redblacks	Yani Gouadfel	DB	Bishop's
50	Saskatchewan Roughriders	D'Sean Mimbs	WR	Regina
51	Calgary Stampeders	Tanner McLachlan	TE	Arizona
52	Hamilton Tiger-Cats	Jonathan Giustini	DB	Alberta
53	BC Lions	Terrence Ganyi	LB	Maine
54	Toronto Argonauts	Justin Sambu	DL	Baylor
55	Winnipeg Blue Bombers	Abdul-Karim Gassama	WR	Manitoba
56	Montreal Alouettes	Michael Herzog	RB	Hillsdale

=== Round seven ===
Pick #	CFL team	Player	Position	University
57	Edmonton Elks	Evan Anseeuw	OL	York (ON)
58	Ottawa Redblacks	Zachary Philion	LB	Concordia (QC)
59	Saskatchewan Roughriders	Ajou Ajou	WR	South Florida
60	Calgary Stampeders	Jackson Sombach	DB	Regina
61	Hamilton Tiger-Cats	John Kourtis	OL	Saskatchewan
62	BC Lions	Dawson Marchant	DB	Northwestern Oklahoma State
63	Edmonton Elks (via Toronto)	Patrick Lavoie	OL	Carleton (ON)
64	Winnipeg Blue Bombers	Michael Vlahogiannis	OL	McGill
65	Montreal Alouettes	Mohsen Jamal	WR	Western Ontario

=== Round eight ===
Pick #	CFL team	Player	Position	University
66	Edmonton Elks	Jacob Spencer	DL	Saginaw Valley State
67	Ottawa Redblacks	Russell Dixon	TE	Connecticut
68	Saskatchewan Roughriders	Richard Aduboffour	DB	Western Ontario
69	Calgary Stampeders	Kaylyn St-Cyr	DB	Montreal
70	Hamilton Tiger-Cats	Mitchell Townsend	LB	British Columbia
71	BC Lions	Theo Johnson	TE	Pennsylvania State
72	Toronto Argonauts	Daniel Shin	OL	Alberta
73	Winnipeg Blue Bombers	Owen Hubert	DL	McMaster
74	Montreal Alouettes	Vincent Delisle	DB	Laval

== Supplemental draft ==
On May 21, a supplemental draft was held with the Edmonton Elks forfeiting an eighth round pick in the 2025 CFL draft to select Antonio Alfano. On June 29, the Elks also forfeited their 2025 first round pick to select Zach Mathis.

== Trades ==
In the explanations below, (D) denotes trades that took place during the draft, while (PD) indicates trades completed pre-draft.

=== Round one ===
- Hamilton ←→ Toronto (PD). Hamilton traded the fifth overall selection and two third-round picks in this year's draft, a conditional third-round pick in the 2025 CFL draft, and the negotiation rights to Deontay Burnett to Toronto in exchange for Jordan Williams, the seventh overall selection, a second-round pick, and a fourth-round pick in this year's draft, and a conditional fourth-round pick in the 2025 CFL draft.
- Winnipeg → Calgary (D). Winnipeg traded this selection and the 28th pick in this year's draft to Calgary in exchange for the 13th and 14th overall selections in this year's draft.

=== Round two ===
- Hamilton → Calgary (PD). Hamilton traded this selection, a first-round pick in the 2023 CFL draft, a third-round pick in the 2023 CFL draft, and a sixth-round pick in the 2023 CFL draft to Calgary in exchange for Bo Levi Mitchell, a first-round pick in the 2023 CFL draft, and a third-round pick in this year's draft.
- Montreal → Edmonton (PD). Montreal traded this selection to Edmonton in exchange for Jesse Gibbon.
- Toronto → Hamilton (PD). Toronto traded a second-round pick in this year's draft, Jordan Williams, the seventh overall selection and a fourth-round pick in this year's draft, and a conditional fourth-round pick in the 2025 CFL draft to Hamilton in exchange for the fifth overall selection and two third-round picks in this year's draft, a conditional third-round pick in the 2025 CFL draft, and the negotiation rights to Deontay Burnett.
- Calgary → Winnipeg (D). Calgary traded the 13th and 14th picks in this year's draft to Winnipeg in exchange for the eighth and 28th overall selections in this year's draft.

=== Round three ===
- Calgary → Hamilton (PD). Calgary traded this selection, Bo Levi Mitchell, and a first-round pick in the 2023 CFL draft to Hamilton in exchange for a second-round pick in this year's draft, a first-round pick in the 2023 CFL draft, a third-round pick in the 2023 CFL draft, and a sixth-round pick in the 2023 CFL draft.
- Hamilton → Toronto (PD). Hamilton traded two third-round picks and the fifth overall selection in this year's draft, a conditional third-round pick in the 2025 CFL draft, and the negotiation rights to Deontay Burnett to Toronto in exchange for Jordan Williams, the seventh overall selection, a second-round pick, and a fourth-round pick in this year's draft, and a conditional fourth-round pick in the 2025 CFL draft.
- Winnipeg → Calgary (D). Winnipeg traded this selection and the eighth pick in this year's draft to Calgary in exchange for the 13th and 14th overall selections in this year's draft.

=== Round four ===
- BC → Hamilton (PD). BC traded a fourth-round selection to Hamilton in exchange for Dane Evans. The draft pick could have been escalated if undisclosed conditions were met.
- Hamilton → BC (PD). Hamilton traded the fourth-round selection originally acquired in the Dane Evans trade above back to BC in exchange for Jonathan Kongbo.
- Ottawa → Edmonton (PD). Ottawa traded this selection to Edmonton in exchange for Kevin Francis.
- BC → Ottawa (PD). BC traded a conditional fourth-round selection and a third-round pick in the 2023 CFL draft to Ottawa in exchange for Terry Williams. This condition was fulfilled, as per the official draft order.
- Toronto → Hamilton (PD). Toronto traded a fourth-round pick in this year's draft, Jordan Williams, the seventh overall selection and a second-round pick in this year's draft, and a conditional fourth-round pick in the 2025 CFL draft to Hamilton in exchange for the fifth overall selection and two third-round picks in this year's draft, a conditional third-round pick in the 2025 CFL draft, and the negotiation rights to Deontay Burnett.

=== Round five ===
- Edmonton → Toronto (PD). Edmonton traded a fifth-round selection and the negotiation rights to Xavier Gipson to Toronto in exchange Sam Acheampong.
- Ottawa → Winnipeg (PD). Ottawa traded a fifth-round selection to Winnipeg in exchange for the negotiation rights of Dru Brown.

=== Round six ===
- Edmonton → Toronto (PD). Edmonton traded a sixth-round selection to Toronto in exchange Theren Churchill. The selection would be upgraded to a fifth-round pick if Churchill is named to the Elks' active roster for at least nine games during the 2023 season.

=== Round seven ===
- Toronto → Edmonton (PD). Toronto traded this selection and Kurleigh Gittens Jr. to Edmonton in exchange for Jake Ceresna and a negotiation list player.

=== Conditional trades ===
- Montreal → Calgary (PD). Montreal traded a conditional second-round selection to Calgary in exchange for the playing rights to Laurent Duvernay-Tardif. The condition will be fulfilled if Duvernay-Tardif signs with the Alouettes.

== See also ==
- 2024 CFL global draft
