= Geoffrey Cantin-Arku =

Canadian gridiron football player (born 1998)

- Cantin-Arku with the Montreal Alouettes in 2026

No. 9 – Montreal Alouettes
- Position: Linebacker
- Roster status: Active
- CFL status: National

Personal information
- Born: October 9, 1998 (age 28); Lévis, Quebec, Canada
- Listed height: 6 ft 3 in (1.91 m)
- Listed weight: 232 lb (105 kg)

Career information
- College: Syracuse, Memphis
- CFL draft: 2024: 1st round, 9th overall pick

Career history
- Montreal Alouettes (2024–present)

Awards and highlights
- Jake Gaudaur Veterans' Trophy (2026)

Career CFL statistics as of 2026
- Total tackles: 176
- Sacks: 14
- Forced fumbles: 5
- Fumble recoveries: 1
- Pass knockdowns: 7
- Interceptions: 3
- Stats at CFL.ca

Geoffrey Cantin-Arku (born October 9, 1998) is a Canadian professional football linebacker for the Montreal Alouettes of the Canadian Football League (CFL). He played college football at Syracuse and Memphis.

== Early life ==
Cantin-Arku was born in Lévis, Quebec. He grew up first playing hockey but later switched to football. After high school, he played three years of CEGEP football at Cégep Garneau in Quebec. Cantin-Arku recorded 55.5 tackles, one sack and two interceptions his final season at Cégep Garneau. He was rated the no. 3 Canadian prospect in the class of 2019 by ESPN. He was also rated the no. 30 outside linebacker by Rivals.com, no. 42 outside linebacker by 247Sports.com, and no. 63 outside linebacker by ESPN.

== College career ==
Cantin-Arku first played college football at Syracuse from 2019 to 2021. He played in nine games his freshman year in 2019, mostly on special teams, and made one tackle. He appeared in all 11 games in 2020, starting 10, totaling 63 tackles, a team-leading 4.0 sacks, two forced fumbles and one fumble recovery. Cantin-Arku played in 10 games during the 2021 season before entering the NCAA transfer portal in week 11. He accumulated 43 tackles, one sack, and one forced fumble that season.

Cantin-Arku transferred to play at Memphis from 2022 to 2023. He appeared in all 13 games, starting 11, in 2022, recording 76 tackles, 1.5 sacks, and two pass breakups. He started all 13 games in 2023, totaling 79 tackles, one sack, two forced fumbles, one fumble recovery, one interception, two pass breakups, and one blocked field goal that he also returned for a touchdown. Cantin-Arku earned honorable mention All-AAC honors that season.

== Professional career ==
Pre-draft measurables
Height	Weight	Arm length	Hand span	Wingspan	40-yard dash	10-yard split	20-yard split	20-yard shuttle	Three-cone drill	Vertical jump	Broad jump	Bench press
6 ft 3 1/4 in (1.91 m)	230 lb (104 kg)	32 1/4 in (0.82 m)	9 in (0.23 m)	6 ft 5 1/2 in (1.97 m)	4.87 s	1.69 s	2.77 s	4.32 s	6.97 s	32.0 in (0.81 m)	9 ft 11 in (3.02 m)	18 reps
All values from Pro Day

After going undrafted in the 2024 NFL draft, Cantin-Arku was invited to rookie minicamp with the Miami Dolphins on a tryout basis. He was selected by the Montreal Alouettes of the Canadian Football League (CFL) in the first round, with the ninth overall pick, of the 2024 CFL draft. He officially signed with the Alouettes on May 13, 2024. Cantin-Arku was named the 3DownNation breakout player of the week for week 4 of the 2024 CFL season after recording four tackles on defense, two sacks, and one pass knockdown.

== Personal life ==
Cantin-Arku founded the GCA Football Camp Academy in Quebec City, which serves over 250 youth yearly. He also works with Purolator Tackle Hunger and Welcome Hall Mission, which helps Montreal residents in need. In 2026, Cantin-Arku was awarded the Jake Gaudaur Veterans' Trophy. CFL commissioner Stewart Johnston said "the care and compassion he displays in the community strengthen the bond between the team and the province of Quebec."
