= Daniel Johnson (offensive lineman) =

Kenyan-Canadian gridiron football player (born 1999)

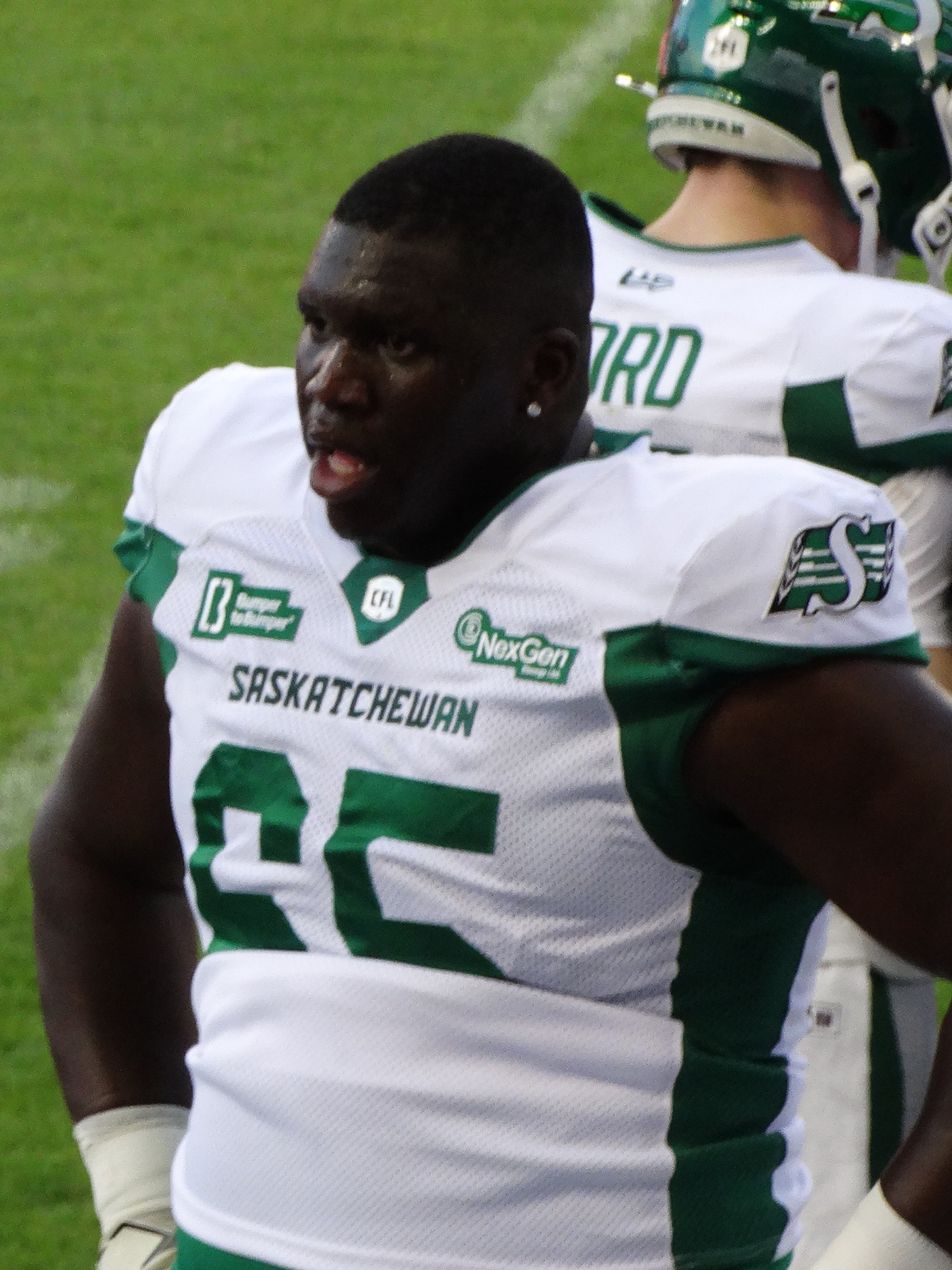
- Johnson with the Saskatchewan Roughriders in 2025

No. 65 – Saskatchewan Roughriders
- Position: Offensive lineman
- Roster status: Active
- CFL status: National

Personal information
- Born: September 1, 1999 (age 27); Nairobi, Kenya
- Listed height: 6 ft 5 in (1.96 m)
- Listed weight: 307 lb (139 kg)

Career information
- High school: Catholic Central (London, Ontario, Canada)
- College: Kent State (2018–2021); Purdue (2022–2023)
- CFL draft: 2024: 5th round, 41st overall pick

Career history
- Saskatchewan Roughriders (2024–present)

Awards and highlights
- Grey Cup champion (2025)
- Stats at CFL.ca

Daniel Johnson (born September 1, 1999) is a Kenyan-Canadian professional gridiron football offensive lineman for the Saskatchewan Roughriders of the Canadian Football League (CFL). He played college football at Kent State and Purdue.

== Early life ==
Daniel Johnson was born on September 1, 1999, in a refugee camp in Nairobi, Kenya. Johnson and some of his family moved to London, Ontario, when he was one year old. Johnson later said "I still have family back home struggling and it’s great that my family and a couple of my cousins got to come over here and live a different life than my parents did." He played high school football at Catholic Central High School in London, Ontario. As a senior in 2017, he helped the team win the London City Championship while earning Canada First Team Defense honors. Canadian Football Chat ranked him the No. 9 prospect in the class of 2018.

== College career ==
Johnson first played college football for the Kent State Golden Flashes of Kent State University as an offensive lineman. He played in one game in 2018 before being redshirted. He played in seven games, starting four, in 2019. Johnson started three games during the COVID-19 shortened 2020 season. He appeared in four games, starting three, in 2021.

In 2022, Johnson transferred to play for the Purdue Boilermakers of Purdue University. He played in five games, starting two, during both the 2023 and 2024 seasons. He suffered a torn ACL during his redshirt senior year. Johnson earned Academic All-Big Ten honors for the 2024 season. He majored in education at Purdue.

== Professional career ==
Pre-draft measurables
Height	Weight	Arm length	Hand span	Wingspan	20-yard shuttle	Three-cone drill	Bench press
6 ft 6 1/8 in (1.98 m)	313 lb (142 kg)	33 3/4 in (0.86 m)	9 1/2 in (0.24 m)	6 ft 9 1/4 in (2.06 m)	4.96 s	8.06 s	19 reps
All values from Pro Day

Johnson was selected by the Saskatchewan Roughriders in the fifth round, with the 41st overall pick, of the 2024 CFL draft. He officially signed with the team on May 14, 2024. He was moved to the practice roster on June 1, 2024, where he spent the remainder of the 2024 CFL season. Johnson re-signed with the Roughriders on November 19, 2024. In May 2025, head coach Corey Mace named Johnson the team's most improved player at training camp. He began the 2025 season on the active roster, as a backup offensive lineman.

== Personal life ==
Johnson's brother George Johnson also played in the CFL. Another brother, Alfred, played basketball at Fanshawe College and professionally in Germany.
