= Daniel Bell (Canadian football) =

Canadian gridiron football player (born 2001)

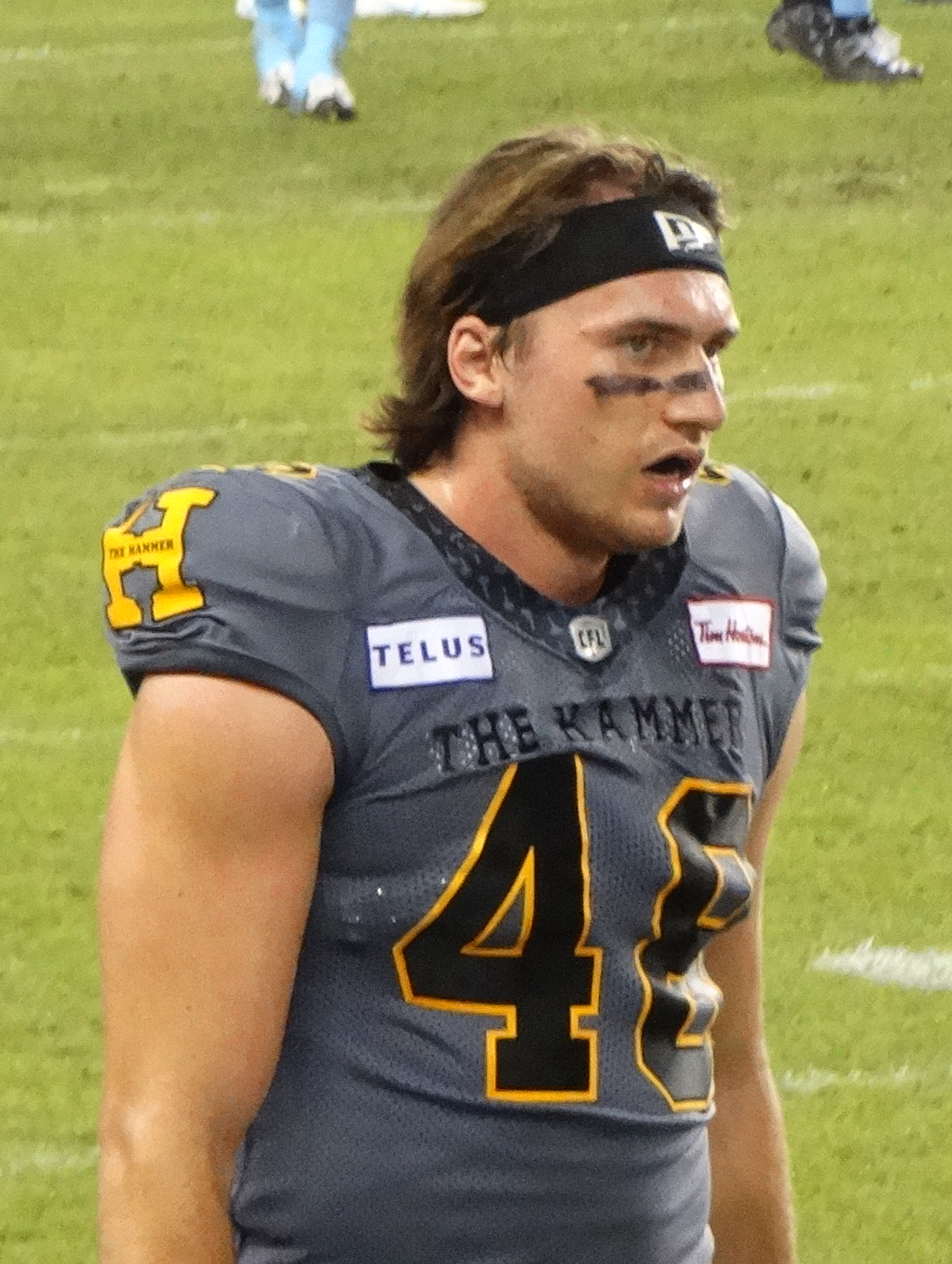
- Bell with the Hamilton Tiger-Cats in 2024

No. 48 – Hamilton Tiger-Cats
- Position: Defensive back
- Roster status: Active
- CFL status: National

Personal information
- Born: May 17, 2001 (age 25); Saint John, New Brunswick, Canada
- Listed height: 6 ft 1 in (1.85 m)
- Listed weight: 218 lb (99 kg)

Career information
- University: Mount Allison
- CFL draft: 2024: 4th round, 34th overall pick

Career history
- 2024–present: Hamilton Tiger-Cats

Awards and highlights
- Second-team All-Canadian (2023)
- Stats at CFL.ca

Daniel Bell (born May 17, 2001) is a Canadian professional football defensive back for the Hamilton Tiger-Cats of the Canadian Football League (CFL).

== University career ==
Bell played U Sports football for the Mount Allison Mounties from 2019 to 2023. After sitting out in 2020 due to the cancelled 2020 U Sports football season, he played in 30 games with the team where he had 177 tackles, six interceptions, 19 tackles for loss, and seven sacks. He was the AUS most outstanding defensive player in 2021 and 2023, a First Team U Sports All-Canadian in 2021, a Second Team U Sports All-Canadian in 2023, and an AUS All-Star in each of his four seasons.

== Professional career ==
Pre-draft measurables
Height	Weight	40-yard dash	20-yard shuttle	Three-cone drill	Vertical jump	Broad jump	Bench press
6 ft 1 3/8 in (1.86 m)	218 lb (99 kg)	4.88 s	4.25 s	6.87 s	35.5 in (0.90 m)	9 ft 10 1/8 in (3.00 m)	6 reps
All values from CFL Combine

Bell was selected by the Hamilton Tiger-Cats in the fourth round, 34th overall, of the 2024 CFL draft and signed with the team on May 9, 2024. He made the team's active roster following training camp in 2024 and had his professional debut on June 8, 2024, against the Calgary Stampeders where he recorded one special teams tackle. He played in 17 regular season games where he had ten special teams tackles.
