= Gabe Wallace =

Canadian gridiron football player (born 2000)

- Wallace with the Winnipeg Blue Bombers in 2026

No. 61 – Winnipeg Blue Bombers
- Position: Offensive lineman
- Roster status: Active
- CFL status: National

Personal information
- Born: January 9, 2000 (age 26); Nelson, British Columbia, Canada
- Listed height: 6 ft 6 in (1.98 m)
- Listed weight: 327 lb (148 kg)

Career information
- High school: St. Andrew's College
- College: Buffalo
- CFL draft: 2024: 2nd round, 17th overall pick

Career history
- 2024–present: Winnipeg Blue Bombers
- Stats at CFL.ca

Gabe Wallace (born January 9, 2000) is a Canadian professional football offensive lineman for the Winnipeg Blue Bombers of the Canadian Football League (CFL).

== College career ==
After using a redshirt season in 2018, Wallace played college football for the Buffalo Bulls from 2019 to 2023. He dressed in 49 games, starting in 28 at guard, seven games at left tackle, and two games at right tackle.

== Professional career ==
Pre-draft measurables
Height	Weight	Arm length	Hand span	Wingspan	40-yard dash	10-yard split	20-yard split	20-yard shuttle	Three-cone drill	Vertical jump	Broad jump	Bench press
6 ft 5 3/4 in (1.97 m)	344 lb (156 kg)	33 7/8 in (0.86 m)	9 3/8 in (0.24 m)	6 ft 9 in (2.06 m)	5.78 s	1.88 s	3.25 s	5.31 s	8.52 s	29.5 in (0.75 m)	7 ft 9 in (2.36 m)	29 reps
All values from Pro Day

Wallace was drafted in the second round with the 17th overall pick in the 2024 CFL draft by the Winnipeg Blue Bombers and signed with the team on May 5, 2024. Following training camp in 2024, he made the team's active roster and played in his first professional game on June 7, 2024, against the Montreal Alouettes. He played in 12 regular season games while missing time in the middle of the season due to injury. He played in both post-season games, including the 111th Grey Cup where the Blue Bombers' lost 24–41 to the Toronto Argonauts.
