= Corey Mace =

Canadian gridiron footballer and coach (born 1985)

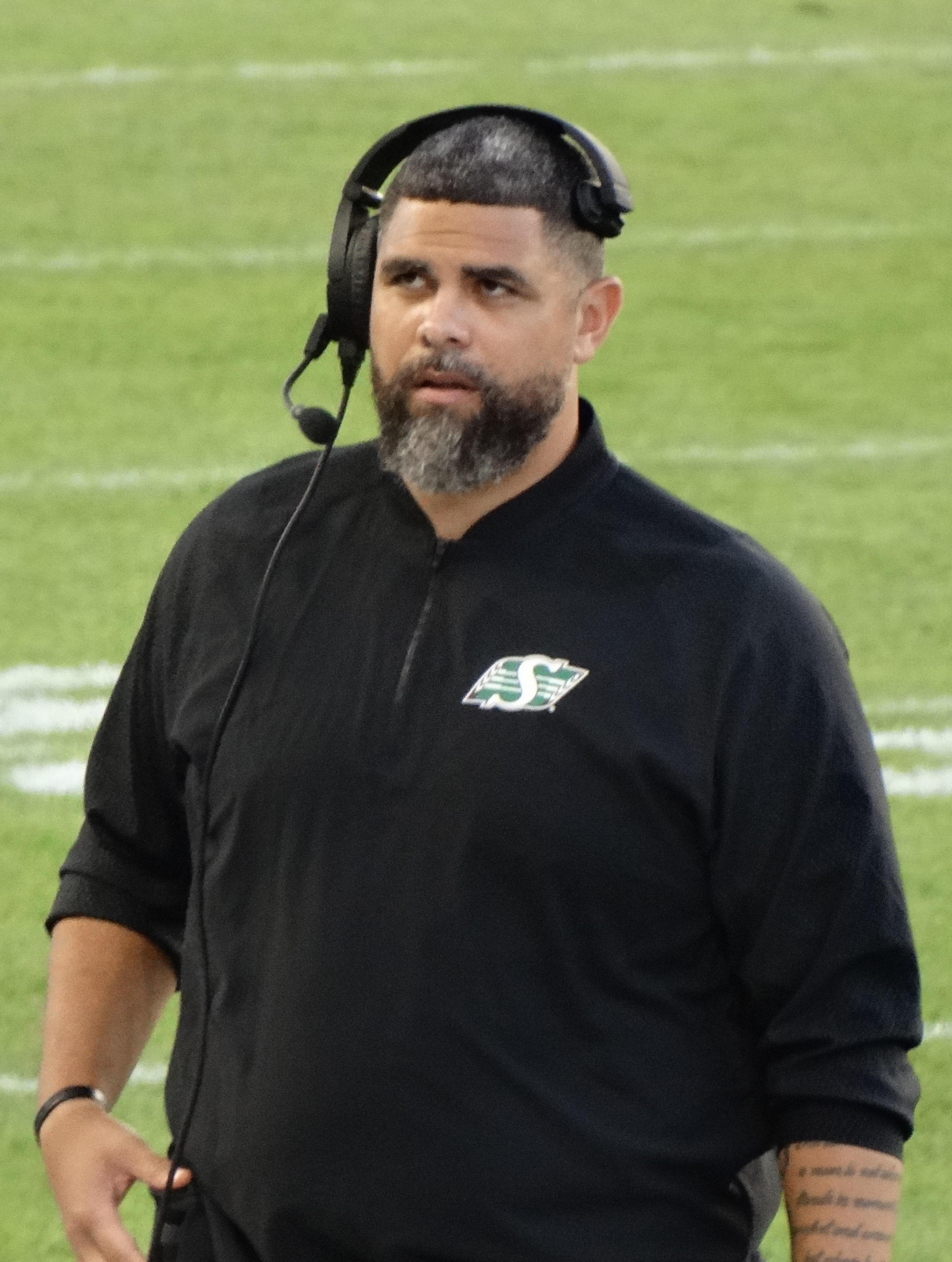
- Mace with the Saskatchewan Roughriders in 2024

Saskatchewan Roughriders
- Title: Head coach

Personal information
- Born: December 22, 1985 (age 40); Port Moody, British Columbia, Canada
- Listed height: 6 ft 3 in (1.91 m)
- Listed weight: 287 lb (130 kg)

Career information
- Position: Defensive tackle (No. 74, 75, 99)
- High school: Port Moody
- College: Palomar College (2004); Wyoming (2005–2006)
- CFL draft: 2007: 2nd round, 11th overall pick

Career history

Playing
- Buffalo Bills (2007–2009); Calgary Stampeders (2010–2015)

Coaching
- Calgary Stampeders (2016–2021) Defensive line coach; Toronto Argonauts (2022–2023) Defensive coordinator; Saskatchewan Roughriders (2024–present) Head coach (2024–present) Defensive coordinator (2024–2025)

Awards and highlights
- 4× Grey Cup champion (2014, 2018, 2022, 2025); Annis Stukus Trophy winner (2025); Second-team All-MW (2006); 2014 Presidents' Ring Award

Career NFL statistics
- Games played: 5
- Total tackles: 2
- Pass deflections: 1
- Interceptions: 1
- Stats at Pro Football Reference

Career CFL statistics
- Games played: 40
- Total tackles: 44
- Sacks: 4
- Defensive touchdowns: 2

Corey Mace (born December 22, 1985) is a Canadian professional football coach and former player who is the head coach for the Saskatchewan Roughriders of the Canadian Football League (CFL). He played as a defensive tackle in the CFL and National Football League (NFL). Mace played college football for the Wyoming Cowboys. He was signed by the NFL's Buffalo Bills as an undrafted free agent in 2007.

== College career ==
Mace played college football at Palomar College before transferring to the University of Wyoming.

== Professional career ==
Pre-draft measurables
| Height | Weight |
|---|---|
| 6 ft 2 7/8 in (1.90 m) | 285 lb (129 kg) |
Values from Pro Day

=== 2007 CFL draft ===
Mace was selected by the Winnipeg Blue Bombers in the second round of the 2007 CFL draft. Mace signed with the NFL's Buffalo Bills just before draft day.

=== Buffalo Bills (first stint) ===
Mace signed with the Buffalo Bills as an undrafted free agent in 2007. He spent two seasons with the team, appearing in three games in 2008 and recording one tackle. He was not tendered a contract offer as an exclusive-rights free agent in the 2009 offseason.

=== Hamilton Tiger-Cats ===
The Hamilton Tiger-Cats acquired Mace's CFL rights (from the Blue Bombers) along with a 2009 CFL draft first round pick in exchange for linebacker Zeke Moreno in the 2008 CFL season. Mace and the Tiger-Cats got into a contract dispute following the 2009 season. Mace wanted to receive a contract of one-year plus an option year that would enable him to explore NFL options in 2010 with a salary comparable to that of an NFL practice roster player of $95,000. The Tiger-Cats were said to be offering closer to the $65,000 normally offered to second-round draft choices.

=== Toronto Argonauts ===
Mace's rights were acquired by the Toronto Argonauts, along with a 2010 third-round pick and a conditional pick in 2011 for disgruntled receiver Arland Bruce III.

=== Buffalo Bills (second stint) ===
Mace was re-signed by the Bills on July 31, 2009. He was waived on September 5 was re-signed to the practice squad the next day. He was signed off the practice squad to the active roster on November 28. He appeared in 2 games and recorded one tackle and one interception, which was returned for 0 yards. On December 7, he was waived by the Bills and added to the practice squad on December 10.

=== Calgary Stampeders ===
Mace's CFL rights were traded by the Toronto Argonauts on August 22, 2010, in exchange for non-import linebacker Tristan Black. After the Argonauts traded Mace's rights to the Stampeders, he signed a contract on Aug 29, 2010 to join the Stampeders for the remainder of the 2010 CFL season. Despite being drafted by the Blue Bombers having playing experience with the Bills, Mace did not receive any CFL playing time until the 2010 CFL season. Mace appeared in eight games for the Stamps during the 2010 season. He recovered a fumble and returned it 60 yards for a touchdown in Calgary's October 17 victory in Saskatchewan.

In Week 1 of the 2011 CFL season, Mace suffered a ruptured Achilles tendon which caused him to miss the remainder of the season.

Mace played a more significant role in the 2012 CFL season. He started all 21 regular-season and post-season games, recording 25 tackles, 2 forced fumbles and 1 sack, and catching a one-yard touchdown pass in an Oct. 26 game against B.C. During the post-season, Mace recorded three defensive tackles and one sack. In December 2012, he signed a contract extension.

Mace suffered a torn shoulder labrum in Week 1 of the 2013 CFL season which caused him to undergo season-ending surgery.

Mace made 12 starts during the 2014 CFL season, missing 6 games with injuries. Statistically, he had 11 tackles, a sack and a 10-yard fumble recovery that set up a touchdown. He played in both of the Stamps post-season games, knocking a pass down in the West Division Final, and recording a sack in Calgary's win in the 102nd Grey Cup.

Following the 2014 season, Mace and the Stampeders agreed to terms of a new contract, preventing him from becoming a free-agent. He was the recipient of the Presidents' Ring, a team award presented annually for performance on and off the field. His community initiatives have included starting a holiday turkey and ham drive for food banks and charitable groups, and launching Mace's Faces, which allows 15 at-risk youth to attend every Stampeder home game.

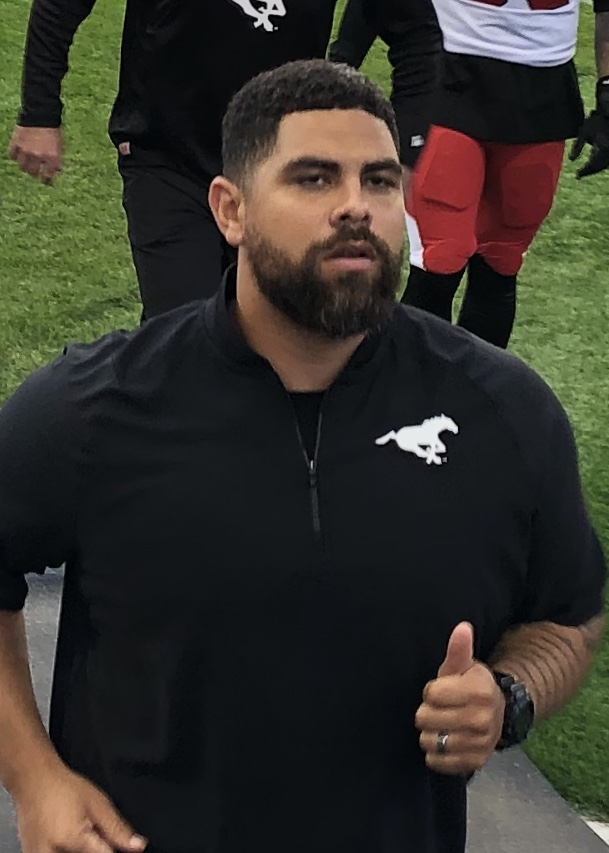
Mace with the Calgary Stampeders in 2019

Mace did not play a single game in 2015 after fracturing his foot in the preseason.

After the 2015 season, Mace retired from playing professional football. In the CFL, he appeared in 40 regular-season and 6 post-season games, and recorded 44 tackles and 4 sacks.

== CFL statistics ==
=== Regular season ===
| Year | Team | GP | DT | FF | QS | Fumble return | YD | TD | Rec | YD | TD |
|---|---|---|---|---|---|---|---|---|---|---|---|
| 2010 | CGY | 8 | 6 | 0 | 1 | 1 | 60 | 1 | 0 | - | - |
| 2011 | CGY | 1 | 2 | 0 | 1 | 0 | - | - | 0 | - | - |
| 2012 | CGY | 18 | 25 | 2 | 1 | 0 | - | - | 1 | 1 | 1 |
| 2013 | CGY | 1 | 0 | 0 | 0 | 0 | - | - | 0 | - | - |
| 2014 | CGY | 12 | 11 | | 1 | 1 | 10 | 0 | 0 | - | - |
| 2015 | CGY | 0 | - | - | - | - | - | - | - | - | - |
| Totals | | 40 | | | 4 | 2 | 70 | 1 | 1 | 1 | 1 |

=== Playoffs ===
| Year & game | Team | GP | DT | QS |
|---|---|---|---|---|
| 2010 West Final | CGY | 1 | 3 | 0 |
| 2011 West Semi-Final | CGY | 0 | - | - |
| 2012 West Semi-Final | CGY | 1 | | |
| 2012 West Final | CGY | 1 | | |
| 2013 West Final | CGY | 0 | - | - |
| 2014 West Final | CGY | 1 | | |
| 2015 West Semi-Final | CGY | 0 | - | - |
| 2015 West Final | CGY | 0 | - | - |
| Totals | | 4 | | |

=== Grey Cup ===
| Year | Team | GP | DT | QS |
|---|---|---|---|---|
| 2012 | CGY | 1 | 1 | 0 |
| 2014 | CGY | 1 | | 1 |
| Totals | | 2 | | |

== Coaching career ==
=== Calgary Stampeders ===
On December 10, 2015, following his retirement, he was announced as the Calgary Stampeders' defensive line coach, replacing his former teammate and coach Devone Claybrooks who stepped into the role of Stampeders defensive coordinator. He won his first Grey Cup as a coach when the Stampeders won the 106th Grey Cup over the Ottawa Redblacks. Mace served as Calgary's Defensive Line Coach from 2016 to 2021.

=== Toronto Argonauts ===
On January 6, 2022, it was announced that Mace had joined the Toronto Argonauts as the team's defensive coordinator. In his first season as a defensive coordinator, he won the Grey Cup following the team's victory in he 109th Grey Cup game. On November 29, 2022, it was reported by TSN insider Farhan Lalji that Mace was one of three finalists for the vacant Ottawa Redblacks head coaching job. However, he remained with the Argonauts for the 2023 season and later agreed to a contract extension on October 13, 2023.

=== Saskatchewan Roughriders ===
On November 29, 2023, TSN reported that Mace had been named as the new head coach of the Saskatchewan Roughriders. The Roughriders officially announced him as the team's 48th head coach in club history on November 30, 2023. He also served as the team's defensive coordinator. In his first season, he led the team to a 9–8–1 record and a home playoff game following a two-year post-season drought, but lost to the Winnipeg Blue Bombers in the West Final. In 2025, the Roughriders finished first in the league with a 12–6 record and Mace led his team to a 112th Grey Cup championship, his first as a head coach and his fourth overall. In 2026, he appointed defensive coordinator duties to Josh Bell.

=== CFL coaching record ===
| Team | Year | Regular season | | | | | Postseason | | |
| Team | Year | Won | Lost | Ties | Win % | Finish | Won | Lost | Result |
|---|---|---|---|---|---|---|---|---|---|
| SSK | 2024 | 9 | 8 | 1 | .528 | 2nd in West Division | 1 | 1 | Lost in West Final |
| SSK | 2025 | 12 | 6 | 0 | .667 | 1st in West Division | 2 | 0 | Won 112th Grey Cup |
| SSK | 2026 | 10 | 8 | 0 | .556 | 3rd in West Division | 0 | 1 | Lost in West Semi-Final |
| Total | | 31 | 22 | 1 | .583 | 1 Division Championship | 3 | 2 | |
