= John Bosse =

American gridiron football player (born 2000)

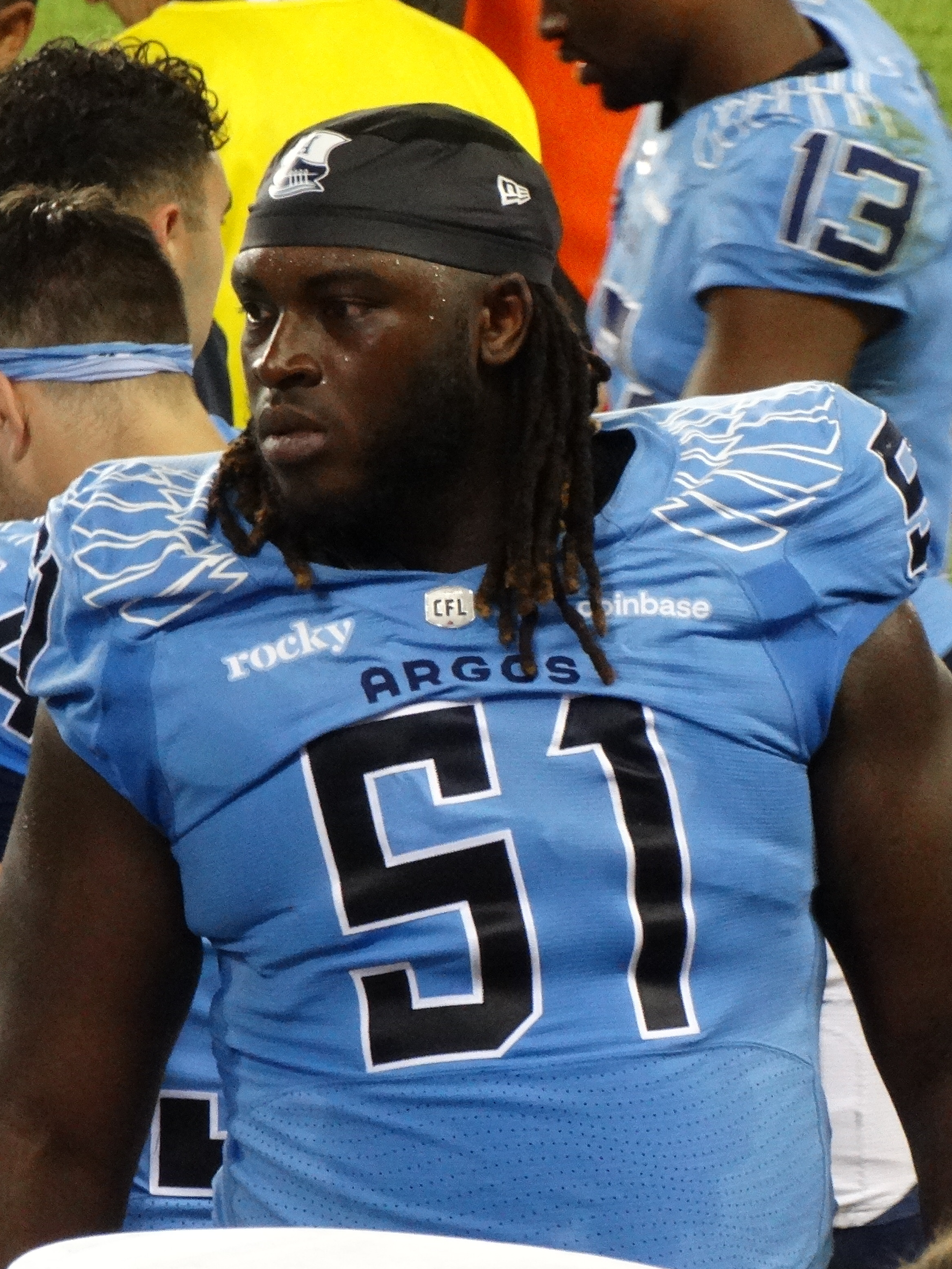
- Bosse with the Toronto Argonauts in 2025

Profile
- Position: Offensive lineman

Personal information
- Born: August 1, 2000 (age 26); Fort Myers, Florida, U.S.
- Listed height: 6 ft 4 in (1.93 m)
- Listed weight: 335 lb (152 kg)

Career information
- High school: Lester B. Pearson
- University: Calgary
- CFL draft: 2024: 3rd round, 25th overall pick

Career history
- 2024–2025: Toronto Argonauts
- 2026: Edmonton Elks

Awards and highlights
- Grey Cup champion (2024); Vanier Cup champion (2019)
- Stats at CFL.ca

John Bosse (born August 1, 2000) is an American professional football offensive lineman.

== Early life ==
Bosse was born in Fort Myers, Florida. After moving to Canada, Bosse played community football as a defensive end and defensive tackle as a member of the Calgary Cyclones in the Calgary Bantam Football Association. After playing with the Cyclones for the 2013 CBFA season, Bosse played high school football in tackle and defensive tackle positions with the Lester B. Pearson Patriots from 2015 to 2017.

== University career ==
Bosse committed to the University of Calgary where he was rostered as a defensive lineman for the Calgary Dinos football team during the 2018 season, but did not play in his first year. From 2019 onwards, Bosse joined the Dinos' offensive line, playing in right tackle and guard assignments. In 2019, Bosse played in seven regular season games and four post-season games, including the 55th Vanier Cup victory over the Montreal Carabins. He did not play in 2020 due to the cancellation of the 2020 U Sports football season, but played in five games over each of the subsequent five seasons. Over the course of his time at Calgary, Bosse gained 70 lbs (32 kg), finishing his college football career at 320 lbs (145 kg). He was an arts major while attending Calgary.

== Professional career ==
Pre-draft measurables
Height	Weight	40-yard dash	20-yard shuttle	Three-cone drill	Vertical jump	Broad jump	Bench press
6 ft 4 1/2 in (1.94 m)	335 lb (152 kg)	5.37 s	5.13 s	7.89 s	25.0 in (0.64 m)	8 ft 6 5/8 in (2.61 m)	25 reps
All values from CFL Combine

=== Toronto Argonauts ===
On April 30, 2024, the Toronto Argonauts selected Bosse in the third round, 25th overall, of the 2024 CFL draft. He was the 11th Dino offensive lineman drafted within the previous ten years and was the first Dino drafted by the Argonauts since Peter Nicastro was selected in the first round of the 2021 CFL draft. Bosse signed with the Argonauts on May 6, 2024. Following training camp for the 2024 season, he was placed on the practice roster, but he made his professional debut on September 7, 2024, against the Ottawa Redblacks, as a backup offensive lineman. He returned to the practice roster but was reactivated for the final game of the regular season with the Argonauts' playoff seeding already decided, where Bosse made his first career start, at left tackle, on October 25, 2024, against the Edmonton Elks. He returned to the practice roster for the post-season and remained there when the Argonauts defeated the Winnipeg Blue Bombers in the 111th Grey Cup. His contract expired the day after the Grey Cup, but he re-signed with the Argonauts on January 16, 2025.

On May 31, 2026, Bosse was released by the Argonauts as part of final roster cuts.

=== Edmonton Elks ===
Bosse was signed to the practice roster of the Edmonton Elks on June 16, 2026. On October 12, he was released.
