= Joel Dublanko =

American gridiron football player (born 1998)

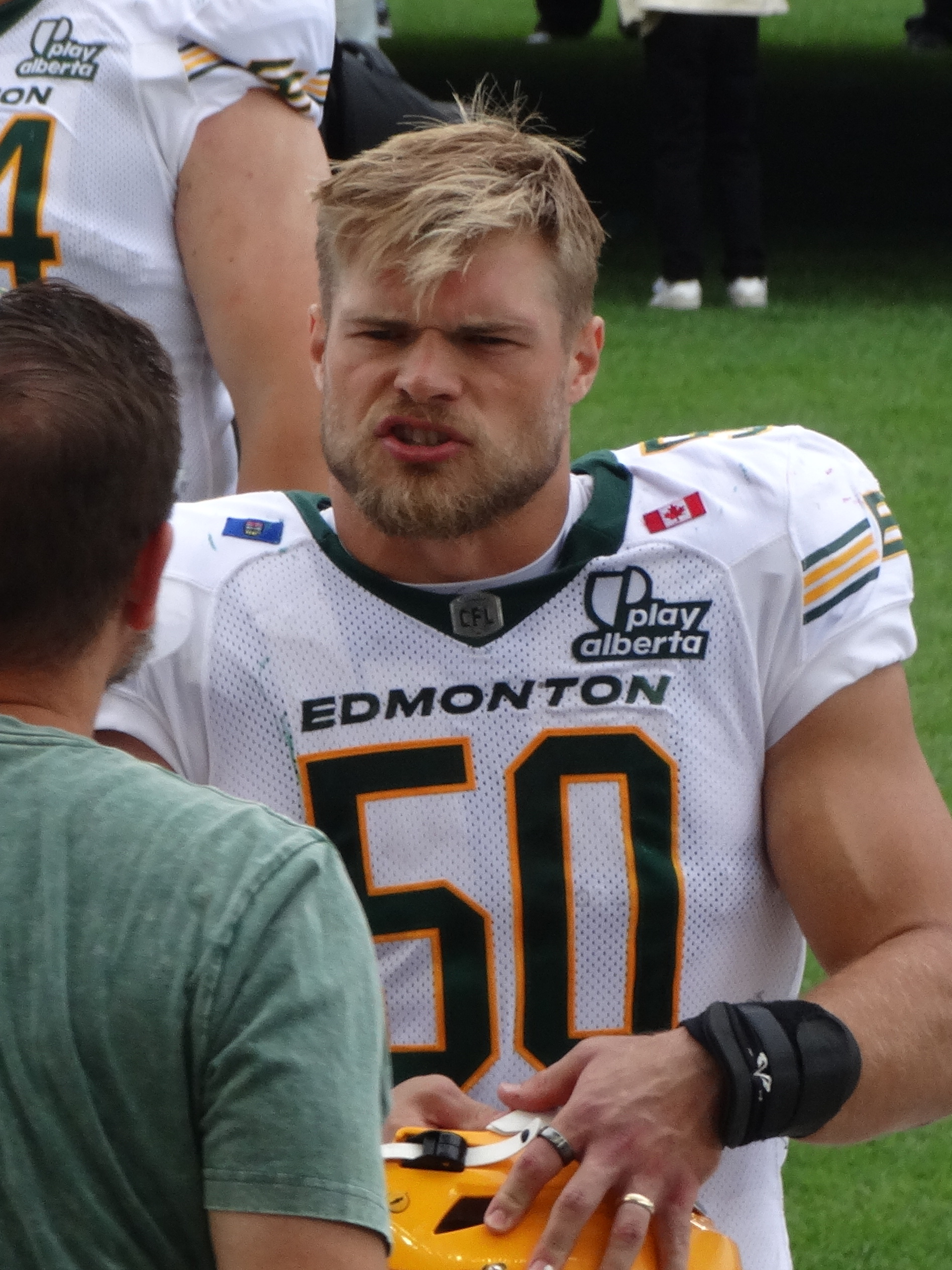
- Dublanko with the Edmonton Elks in 2025

No. 50 – Edmonton Elks
- Position: Linebacker
- Roster status: Active
- CFL status: National

Personal information
- Born: January 12, 1998 (age 28); Aberdeen, Washington, U.S.
- Listed height: 6 ft 2 in (1.88 m)
- Listed weight: 231 lb (105 kg)

Career information
- High school: Aberdeen
- College: Cincinnati
- CFL draft: 2024: 1st round, 1st overall pick

Career history
- 2022: New Orleans Saints*
- 2022: Seattle Seahawks*
- 2023: San Antonio Brahmas
- 2023: Philadelphia Stars
- 2024–present: Edmonton Elks
- * Offseason or practice squad member only

Awards and highlights
- Grey Cup champion (2026)

Career CFL statistics as of 2026
- Total tackles: 175
- Sacks: 4
- Forced fumbles: 2
- Fumble recoveries: 3
- Pass knockdowns: 5
- Interceptions: 1
- Stats at CFL.ca

Joel Dublanko (born January 12, 1998) is an American–Canadian professional football linebacker for the Edmonton Elks of the Canadian Football League (CFL). He was the first overall pick in the 2024 CFL draft.

== College career ==
After using a redshirt season in 2016, Dublanko played college football for the Cincinnati Bearcats from 2017 to 2021. He played in 64 games where he had 233 total tackles, 22 tackles for a loss, 7.5 sacks, three forced fumbles, two fumble recoveries, and one interception.

== Professional career ==
Pre-draft measurables
Height	Weight	Arm length	Hand span	Wingspan	40-yard dash	10-yard split	20-yard split	20-yard shuttle	Three-cone drill	Vertical jump	Broad jump	Bench press
6 ft 2 1/8 in (1.88 m)	243 lb (110 kg)	29 1/2 in (0.75 m)	9 in (0.23 m)	6 ft 2 1/4 in (1.89 m)	4.76 s	1.63 s	2.75 s	4.40 s	7.22 s	35.0 in (0.89 m)	9 ft 7 in (2.92 m)	20 reps
All values from Pro Day

=== New Orleans Saints ===
After going unselected in the 2022 NFL draft, Dublanko signed as a free agent with the New Orleans Saints on April 30, 2022. However, he was waived by the team before training camp that year.

=== Seattle Seahawks ===
On August 5, 2022, Dublanko was signed by the Seattle Seahawks. After training camp, Dublanko was part of the team's final cuts on August 29, 2022.

=== San Antonio Brahmas ===
Dublanko joined the San Antonio Brahmas of the XFL for their 2023 season and played in one game for the team before being released.

=== Philadelphia Stars ===
Dublanko signed with the Philadelphia Stars of the USFL later in their 2023 season and played in seven games for the team where he recorded 17 solo tackles, ten assisted tackles, and 0.5 sacks. The Stars folded after the season when the XFL and USFL merged to become the United Football League (UFL) and he was not signed by another UFL team ahead of the 2024 season.

=== Edmonton Elks ===
After obtaining his Canadian citizenship, Dublanko was added to the players eligible for the 2024 CFL draft in March 2024. After attending the CFL Combine, he was listed as the sixth-best player in the Canadian Football League's Amateur Scouting Bureau April rankings for players eligible in the draft. He was then drafted first overall by the Edmonton Elks in the 2024 CFL draft and signed with the team on May 6, 2024. He made the opening day roster and made his CFL debut on June 8, 2024, against the Saskatchewan Roughriders where he had one special teams tackle.

== Personal life ==
Dublanko's paternal grandparents were Canadians and his father was born in Edmonton. Dublanko's cousin, Curtis Dublanko, is a former linebacker who played in four seasons in the Canadian Football League.
