= Bradley Hladik =

Canadian gridiron football player (born 2000)

No. 35 – Edmonton Elks
- Positions: Fullback, Long snapper
- Roster status: Active
- CFL status: National

Personal information
- Born: November 10, 2000 (age 26)
- Listed height: 6 ft 3 in (1.91 m)
- Listed weight: 245 lb (111 kg)

Career information
- High school: Vernon (Vernon, British Columbia)
- CJFL: Okanagan Sun
- University: UBC (2019–2023)
- CFL draft: 2024: 2nd round, 18th overall pick

Career history
- Edmonton Elks (2024–present)

Awards and highlights
- Grey Cup champion (2026)

Career CFL statistics as of 2026
- Games played: 17
- Stats at CFL.ca

Bradley Hladik (born November 10, 2000) is a Canadian professional football fullback and long snapper for the Edmonton Elks of the Canadian Football League (CFL). He played U Sports football for the UBC Thunderbirds.

== Junior career ==
Hladik played in the Canadian Junior Football League (CJFL) for the Okanagan Sun. He played in six games, recording four special teams tackles, one fumble recovery and two blocked kicks.

== University career ==
Hladik played U Sports football for the UBC Thunderbirds from 2019 to 2023. He played multiple positions, spending time as a fullback, tight end and was the team's long snapper in 2023. In 40 games, Hladik had 29 receptions for 288 yards, two touchdowns and nine tackles.

== Professional career ==
Pre-draft measurables
Height	Weight	Arm length	Hand span	Wingspan	40-yard dash	10-yard split	20-yard split	20-yard shuttle	Three-cone drill	Vertical jump	Broad jump	Bench press
6 ft 3 in (1.91 m)	245 lb (111 kg)	31 1/2 in (0.80 m)	8 7/8 in (0.23 m)	6 ft 5 3/8 in (1.97 m)	5.19 s	1.77 s	2.92 s	4.71 s	7.69 s	31 1/2 in (0.80 m)	9 ft 1 in (2.77 m)	21 reps
All values from Pro Day

Hladik was selected by the Edmonton Elks with the 18th overall pick in the second round of the 2024 CFL draft. On May 6, he officially signed with the team. On June 2, Hladik was placed on the suspended list. On August 12, he was released by the team.

On December 6, 2024, Hladik was re-signed by the Elks. On June 1, 2025, he was signed to the practice roster. Hladik was elevated to the active roster on October 23 and made his debut as a reserve fullback the following day against the Calgary Stampeders.

On May 31, 2026, Hladik was moved to the practice roster. On June 23, he was promoted to the active roster, taking over long-snapping duties from Luke Burton-Krahn.
