= Nathaniel Dumoulin Duguay =

Canadian gridiron football player (born 1999)

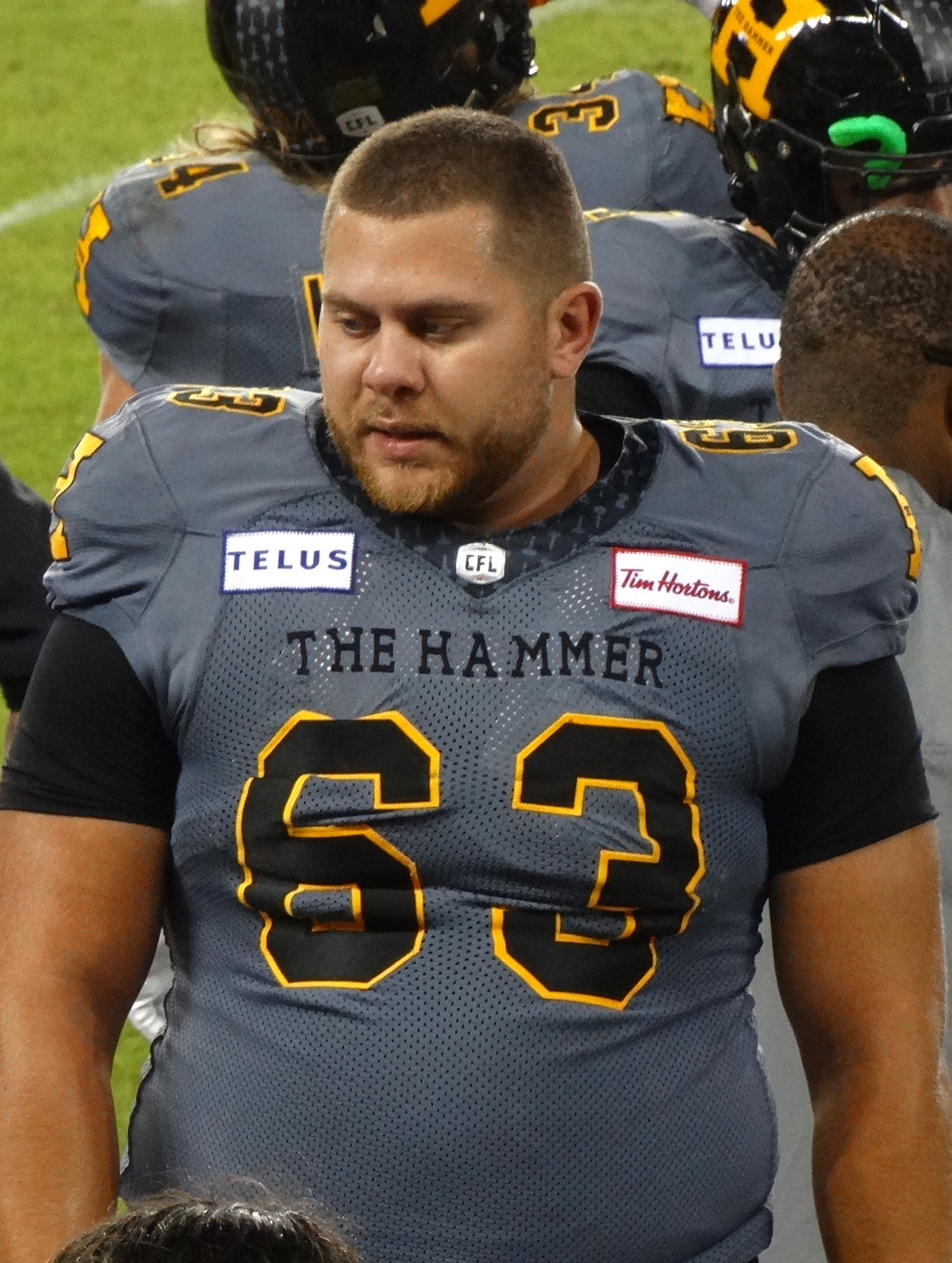
- Dumoulin Duguay with the Hamilton Tiger-Cats in 2024

No. 63 – Hamilton Tiger-Cats
- Position: Offensive lineman
- Roster status: Active
- CFL status: National

Personal information
- Born: August 7, 1999 (age 27); Rimouski, Quebec, Canada
- Listed height: 6 ft 2 in (1.88 m)
- Listed weight: 293 lb (133 kg)

Career information
- CEGEP: Rimouski
- University: Laval
- CFL draft: 2024: 1st round, 7th overall pick

Career history
- 2024–present: Hamilton Tiger-Cats

Awards and highlights
- Second-team All-Canadian (2023)
- Stats at CFL.ca

Nathaniel Dumoulin Duguay (born August 7, 1999) is a Canadian professional football offensive lineman for the Hamilton Tiger-Cats of the Canadian Football League (CFL).

== University career ==
Dumoulin Duguay played U Sports football for the Laval Rouge et Or from 2021 to 2023. After sitting out in 2020 due to the cancelled 2020 U Sports football season and suffering an ankle sprain in 2021, he played in 20 games with the team. He was named a First Team U Sports All-Canadian in 2022 and finished the year with a championship following the Rouge et Or's victory in the 57th Vanier Cup.

== Professional career ==
Pre-draft measurables
Height	Weight	40-yard dash	20-yard shuttle	Three-cone drill	Vertical jump	Broad jump	Bench press
6 ft 2 3/8 in (1.89 m)	293 lb (133 kg)	5.16 s	4.68 s	7.33 s	30.0 in (0.76 m)	9 ft 0 5/8 in (2.76 m)	25 reps
All values from CFL Combine

Dumoulin Duguay was selected by the Hamilton Tiger-Cats in the first round, seventh overall, of the 2024 CFL draft and signed with the team on May 9, 2024. He made the team's active roster following training camp in 2024 and had his professional debut on June 8, 2024, against the Calgary Stampeders. He dressed in 11 regular season games that year as a backup offensive lineman.
