= Daniel Okpoko =

Nigerian-Canadian football player (born 2000)

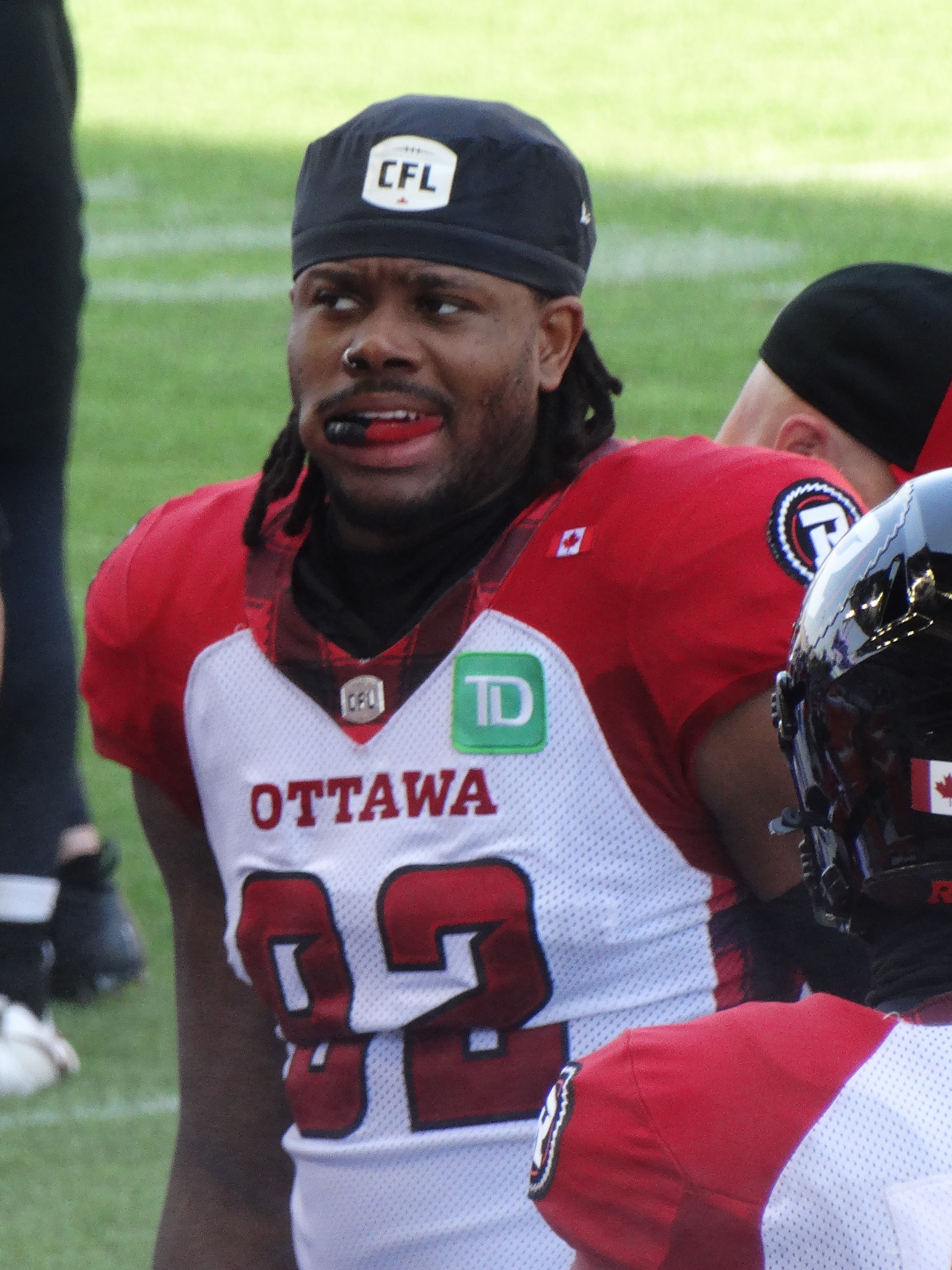
- Okpoko with the Ottawa Redblacks in 2025

No. 92 – Ottawa Redblacks
- Position: Defensive tackle
- Roster status: Active
- CFL status: National

Personal information
- Born: May 25, 2000 (age 26); Lagos, Nigeria
- Listed height: 6 ft 4 in (1.93 m)
- Listed weight: 274 lb (124 kg)

Career information
- High school: St. Joseph (Saskatoon, SK, Canada)
- College: San Diego State (2019–2023)
- CFL draft: 2024: 2nd round, 11th overall pick

Career history
- 2024–present: Ottawa Redblacks
- Stats at CFL.ca

Daniel Okpoko (born May 25, 2000) is a Nigerian-Canadian professional football defensive lineman for the Ottawa Redblacks of the Canadian Football League (CFL). He played college football at San Diego State.

== Early life ==
Okpoko was born in Lagos, Nigeria. He moved to Saskatoon when he was 11 years old. He played high school football at St. Joseph High School in Saskatoon. Okpoko recorded 8.5 sacks during the 2016 season. He participated in basketball and track in high school as well. Okpoko was also a member of the Football Canada U18 national team.

== College career ==
Okpoko played for the San Diego State Aztecs from 2019 to 2023. He was redshirted in 2018. He only played in one game in 2019, and recorded no statistics. Okpoko only appeared in one game during the COVID-19 shortened 2020 season, recording no statistics. He appeared in 11 games during the 2021 season, totaling three tackles and one pass breakup. He played in 12 games in 2022, accumulating nine tackles and one sack. Okpoko started all 12 games during his sixth year of college football in 2023, recording 23 tackles, two sacks, and three pass breakups.

== Professional career ==
Pre-draft measurables
Height	Weight	40-yard dash	20-yard shuttle	Three-cone drill	Vertical jump	Broad jump	Bench press
6 ft 4 1/4 in (1.94 m)	274 lb (124 kg)	4.96 s	4.81 s	7.39 s	34.5 in (0.88 m)	8 ft 8 5/8 in (2.66 m)	11 reps
All values from CFL Combine

Okpoko was selected by the Ottawa Redblacks of the Canadian Football League (CFL) in the second round, with the 11th overall pick, of the 2024 CFL draft. He officially signed with the team on May 6, 2024.

== Personal life ==
Okpoko is cousins with football player Israel Idonije.
