= Willie Roberts =

Willie Roberts may refer to:

- Willie Roberts (American football, born 1931) (1931–2015), American football end
- Willie Roberts (American football, born 1948), American football defensive back
