= Nick Wiebe =

Canadian gridiron football player (born 1999)

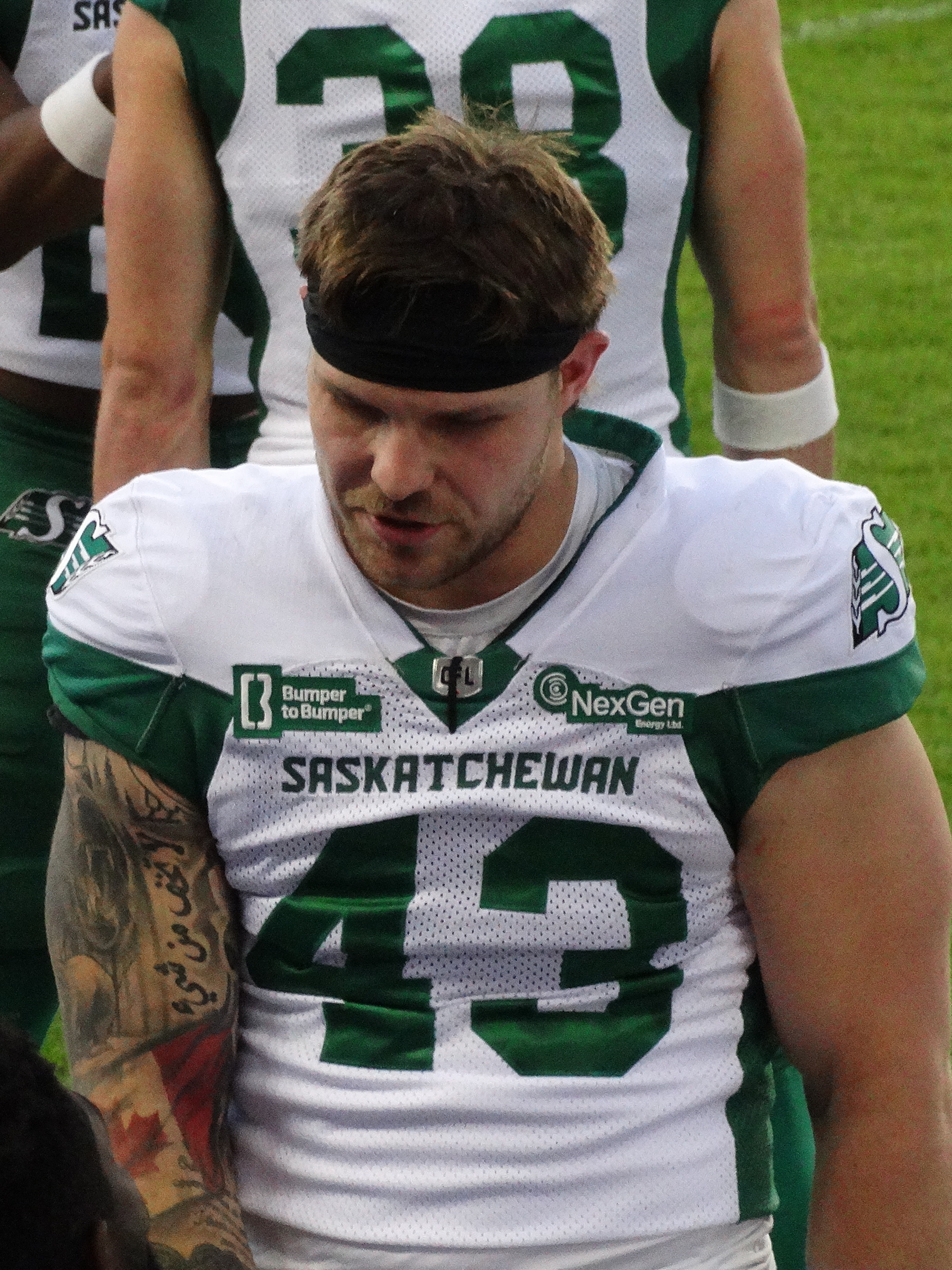
- Wiebe with the Saskatchewan Roughriders in 2025

No. 43 – Saskatchewan Roughriders
- Position: Linebacker
- Roster status: Active
- CFL status: National

Personal information
- Born: August 13, 1999 (age 27); Calgary, Alberta, Canada
- Listed height: 6 ft 3 in (1.91 m)
- Listed weight: 240 lb (109 kg)

Career information
- High school: IMG Academy
- College: Oregon
- University: Saskatchewan
- CFL draft: 2024: 2nd round, 12th overall pick

Career history
- 2024–present: Saskatchewan Roughriders

Awards and highlights
- Grey Cup champion (2025); First-team All-Canadian (2023)

Career CFL statistics as of 2026
- Total tackles: 29
- Forced fumbles: 1
- Fumble recoveries: 1
- Stats at CFL.ca

Nick Wiebe (born August 13, 1999) is a Canadian professional football linebacker for the Saskatchewan Roughriders of the Canadian Football League (CFL).

== University career ==
Wiebe first played NCAA football for the Oregon Ducks from 2018 to 2020 while using a redshirt season in 2019. He played in four games where he had five solo tackles and three assisted tackles. He then transferred to the University of Saskatchewan in 2021 to play for the Huskies and to be closer to family. Wiebe played in three seasons and 31 games for the Huskies where he recorded 199 defensive tackles, including six tackles for a loss, five sacks, and three forced fumbles. In his final season in 2023, he was named the Canada West Most Outstanding Defensive Player and the most outstanding male athlete at the University of Saskatchewan. However, he also suffered a torn ACL in the team's semi-final game against the Alberta Golden Bears, which ended his season.

== Professional career ==
Wiebe was selected in the second round, 12th overall, in the 2024 CFL draft by the Saskatchewan Roughriders and signed with the team on May 6, 2024. He continued to recover from a torn ACL injury and began the season on the six-game injured list. He then made his professional debut on September 7, 2024, against the Winnipeg Blue Bombers in the Banjo Bowl. However, he encountered complications with his knee injury and missed the remainder of the season.

Wiebe made the team's opening day roster in 2025 and recorded two special teams tackles in the team's victory over the Ottawa Redblacks.

== Personal life ==
Wiebe was born to parents Rob and Diane Wiebe. He has a younger brother, Connor, who played for the Victoria Vikes rugby team.
