= Melique Straker =

Canadian gridiron football player (born 2000)

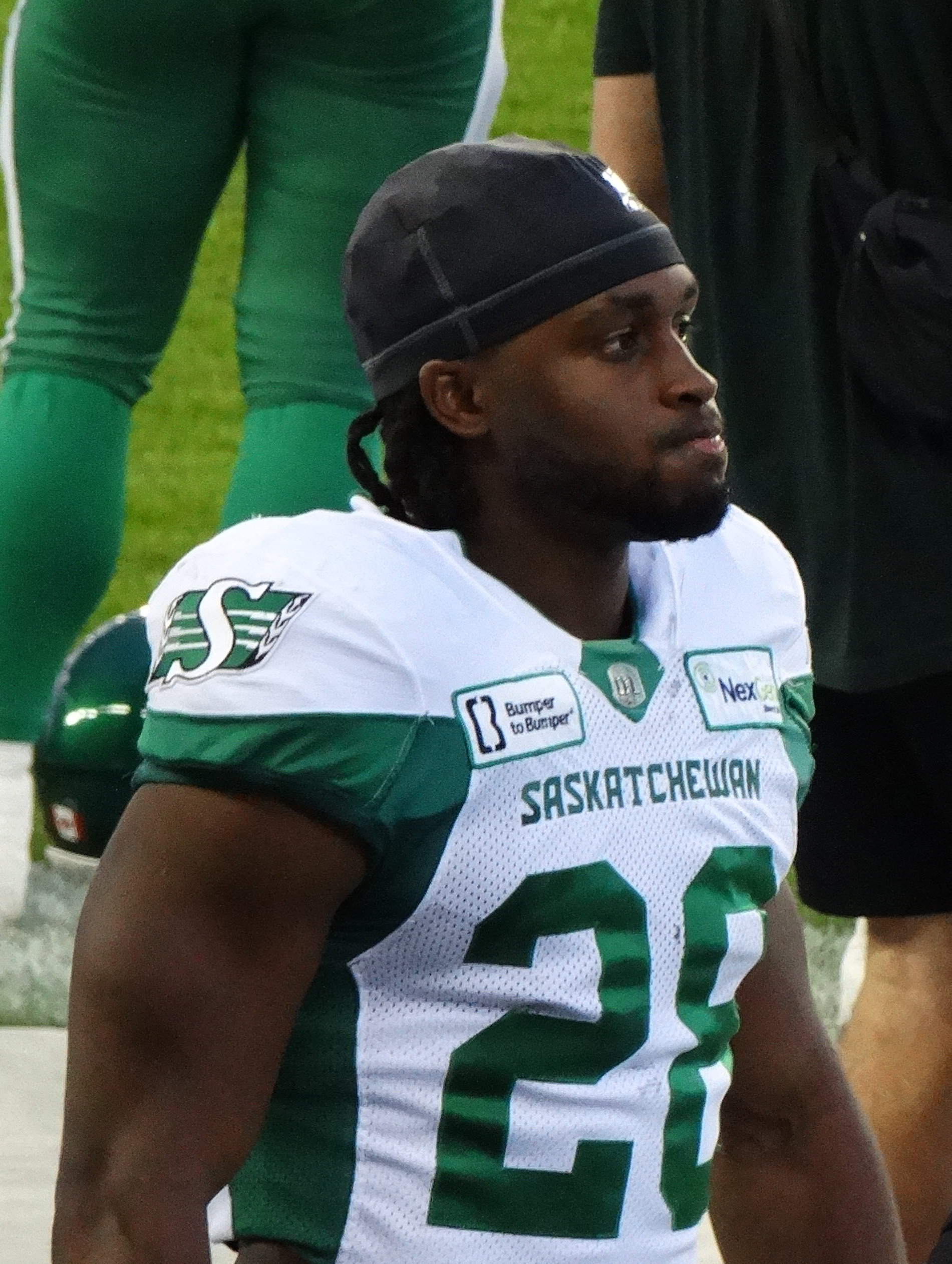
- Straker with the Saskatchewan Roughriders in 2024

No. 28 – Saskatchewan Roughriders
- Position: Linebacker
- Roster status: Active
- CFL status: National

Personal information
- Born: May 22, 2000 (age 26); Brampton, Ontario, Canada
- Listed height: 5 ft 10 in (1.78 m)
- Listed weight: 202 lb (92 kg)

Career information
- High school: Saint Francis High
- College: Arkansas State (2021–2023); Carleton College (2019–2020)
- CFL draft: 2024: 4th round, 32nd overall pick

Career history
- 2024–present: Saskatchewan Roughriders

Awards and highlights
- Grey Cup champion (2025)
- Stats at CFL.ca

Melique Straker (born May 22, 2000) is a Canadian professional football linebacker for the Saskatchewan Roughriders of the Canadian Football League (CFL).

== College career ==
Straker first played college football for the Carleton Knights from 2019 to 2020. He then transferred to Arkansas State University where he played for the Red Wolves from 2021 to 2023. He played in 33 games at Arkansas State where he had 216 tackles, including 18 tackles for a loss, two sacks, two interceptions, and two forced fumbles.

== Professional career ==
Pre-draft measurables
Height	Weight	Arm length	Hand span	Wingspan	40-yard dash	10-yard split	20-yard split	20-yard shuttle	Three-cone drill	Vertical jump	Broad jump	Bench press
5 ft 9 7/8 in (1.77 m)	202 lb (92 kg)	29 1/2 in (0.75 m)	8 1/2 in (0.22 m)	6 ft 0 in (1.83 m)	4.85 s	1.57 s	2.72 s	4.75 s	7.63 s	33.5 in (0.85 m)	10 ft 5 in (3.18 m)	21 reps
All values from Pro Day

Straker was selected in the fourth round, 32nd overall, in the 2024 CFL draft by the Saskatchewan Roughriders and signed with the team on May 6, 2024. He made the team's opening day roster in 2024 and played in his first professional game on June 8, 2024, against the Edmonton Elks, where he had two special teams tackles. He played in 10 regular season games and recorded nine special teams tackles before being placed on the six-game injured list following the Labour Day Classic. He returned to play in his first post-season appearance in the team's West Final loss to the Winnipeg Blue Bombers.
