= Mini-camp =

Camp held by NFL and CFL teams

A mini-camp, also spelled minicamp, is a short camp held by National Football League (NFL) and Canadian Football League (CFL) teams usually in spring of each year. The camp usually only lasts 3 days, but the length varies by a day or two depending on the head coach's preference. Mini-camps are geared toward getting the newly drafted rookies acclimated to the NFL playing schemes. It also gives coaches and team administrators the chance to see their new players in action learning plays from their new team's playbook. Several veteran players of each team will also attend mini-camp to refresh their skills and get acquainted with the new players coming in. Attendance requirements for mini-camp are entirely up to each individual head coach. Some head coaches push for all of the players to be there, while others ask for just the rookies and younger players to attend. The drills and plays run at camp are conducted in shorts and T-shirts or jerseys. They are not "full contact" drills.

NFL mini-camps should not be confused with other football camps, for example those for youths.

== CFL ==
In the CFL, these camps are also referred to as rookie or free-agent camps. The Canadian league began holding them in 2010, when a new collective-bargaining agreement with its player association permitted teams to hold voluntary, non-contact, off-season workouts for up to three days, starting February 1. In 2017, CFL mini-camps were held from mid-April through mid-May in Florida.

== See also ==
- National Football League Training Camp
- NFL Scouting Combine
- CFL Combine
