= 2025 CFL season =

Canadian Football League season

- Duration: June 5 – October 25, 2025
- East champions: Montreal Alouettes
- West champions: Saskatchewan Roughriders

112th Grey Cup
- Date: November 16, 2025
- Venue: Princess Auto Stadium, Winnipeg
- Champions: Saskatchewan Roughriders

CFL seasons
- ← 2024 2026 →

Locations of the active CFL teams West East

The 2025 CFL season was the 71st season of modern professional Canadian football. Officially, it was the 67th season of the Canadian Football League. Winnipeg hosted the 112th Grey Cup on November 16, 2025.

== CFL news in 2025 ==
=== Salary cap ===
According to the new collective bargaining agreement, the 2025 salary cap was scheduled to be set at $5,650,000. However, on February 5, 2025, the league announced that the salary cap would grow by $412,365 to reach $6,062,365 (or $134,719 per active roster spot). The increase was driven by the revenue growth sharing model which first went into effect in 2024, but this was the first year that it impacted the salary cap. The cap excluded unlimited non-football related services payments and preseason and playoff bonus money. The minimum player salary was set at $70,000, which remained unchanged since 2023. It was reported that the revenue growth was not determined until the last week of January and the CFL Player's Association was required to determine how they wanted the money applied, with options including increases to the salary cap, playoff bonuses, training camp stipends, and pension contributions. The timing of the announcement was questionable since the free agency negotiating window had begun three days prior with teams operating with the old salary cap figure.

=== Commissioner change ===
On October 26, 2024, the league announced Randy Ambrosie's intention to retire following the 2024 CFL season. Ambrosie agreed to remain as commissioner until a successor had been named. On April 2, 2025, TSN president Stewart Johnston was announced as Ambrosie's successor, officially assuming the role on April 24.

=== Scheduling ===
The schedule, released on January 16, 2025, was the latest schedule release date since the 2017 season. On January 11, it was reported that the CFL would not host any neutral site Touchdown Series games this season. However, on February 6, it was announced that the Lions would host their preseason game in Langford, British Columbia, at Starlight Stadium. The 2025 preseason ran from May 19 to May 30, the regular season ran between June 5 and October 25, and the postseason took place from November 1 to the 112th Grey Cup on November 16. After the 2024 season featured Sunday night games for the first 13 weeks of the season, the 2025 schedule had Sunday night games from week 4 to week 8 before shifting to Saturday afternoon games for 12 of the final 13 weeks of the regular season. This change helped contribute to a focus on afternoon games for clubs with 23 games starting at 4 pm local time or earlier, compared to 16 such games from 2024. The league also debuted the Stampede Bowl this year, hosted by the Calgary Stampeders on July 3, which was the day before the start of the Calgary Stampede.

== Player movement ==
=== Free agency ===
The 2025 free agency period began on February 11 at noon ET. Pending free agents and teams were able to negotiate offers for one week starting February 2 and ending February 9. All formal offers to a player during this time were sent to both the league and the players union and could not be rescinded.

== Regular season ==
=== Standings ===
West Division
Team	GP	W	L	T	Pts	PF	PA	Div	Stk	
Saskatchewan Roughriders	18	12	6	0	24	472	409	5–5	L2	Details
BC Lions	18	11	7	0	22	559	499	6–4	W6	Details
Calgary Stampeders	18	11	7	0	22	488	416	7–3	W3	Details
Winnipeg Blue Bombers	18	10	8	0	20	459	424	4–6	W2	Details
Edmonton Elks	18	7	11	0	14	422	490	3–7	L2	Details

East Division
Team	GP	W	L	T	Pts	PF	PA	Div	Stk	
Hamilton Tiger-Cats	18	11	7	0	22	525	496	7–1	W1	Details
Montreal Alouettes	18	10	8	0	20	445	430	6–2	L1	Details
Toronto Argonauts	18	5	13	0	10	497	583	2–6	L5	Details
Ottawa Redblacks	18	4	14	0	8	417	537	1–7	L6	Details

== Postseason ==
=== Bracket ===
November 1: Division semi-finals
East
E2	Montreal Alouettes	42
W4	Winnipeg Blue Bombers	33
West
W2	BC Lions	33
W3	Calgary Stampeders	30

November 8: Division finals
E1	Hamilton Tiger-Cats	16
E2	Montreal Alouettes	19
W1	Saskatchewan Roughriders	24
W2	BC Lions	21

November 16: 112th Grey Cup; Princess Auto Stadium – Winnipeg
E2	Montreal Alouettes	17
W1	Saskatchewan Roughriders	25

== Attendance ==
Ranked from highest to lowest average home attendance.

Regular season
No.	Team	Home games	Total attendance	Average attendance
1	Winnipeg Blue Bombers	9	291,087	32,343
2	Saskatchewan Roughriders	9	255,843	28,427
3	BC Lions	9	244,116	27,124
4	Hamilton Tiger-Cats	9	205,722	22,858
5	Calgary Stampeders	9	200,655	22,295
6	Montreal Alouettes	9	190,188	21,132
7	Edmonton Elks	9	171,450	19,050
8	Ottawa Redblacks	9	163,224	18,136
9	Toronto Argonauts	9	135,981	15,109

== Broadcasting ==
In Canada, the CFL continued to be broadcast primarily on TSN (in English) and RDS (in French) across all platforms as part of their contract, which are reported to have been extended through 2025. A select number of games were also be broadcast in Canada on CTV. Games were broadcast in the United States by CBS Sports Network. Outside of North America, the league's streaming platform, CFL+, streamed all regular season games for free (along with games not carried by CBS Sports Network in the United States). Most pre-season games were streamed worldwide for free on CFL+. Radio broadcast rights belonged to teams' local stations and SiriusXM.

== Award winners ==
=== CFL Honour Roll ===
Weekly Honour Roll
Week	Quarterback	Running back	Receiver	Offensive lineman	Defensive lineman	Linebacker	Defensive back	Returner	Kicker/Punter	Special teams	Offensive line
1	Nathan Rourke	Thomas Bertrand-Hudon	Samuel Emilus	Jermarcus Hardrick	Mathieu Betts	Tyrice Beverette	Garry Peters	Isaiah Wooden	Cody Grace	Tyron Vrede	Saskatchewan Roughriders
2	Chris Streveler	Matthew Peterson	Nic Demski	Pier-Olivier Lestage	Lwal Uguak	Jovan Santos-Knox	Adrian Greene	Trey Vaval	José Maltos Díaz	Bennett Williams	Saskatchewan Roughriders
3	Davis Alexander	A.J. Ouellette	Dohnte Meyers	Jarell Broxton	Caleb Sanders	Ben Hladik	Lorenzo Burns	Mario Alford	Sergio Castillo	Aubrey Miller	Edmonton Elks
4	Zach Collaros	Daniel Adeboboye	Tim White	Coulter Woodmansey	Bryce Carter	Geoffrey Cantin-Arku	Tevaughn Campbell	Mario Alford	Carl Meyer	D.K. Bonhomme	Saskatchewan Roughriders
5	Bo Levi Mitchell	Ante Milanovic-Litre	Kenny Lawler	Coulter Woodmansey	Julian Howsare	Derrick Moncrief	Damon Webb	Isaiah Wooden	Lewis Ward	Jaylen Smith	Hamilton Tiger-Cats
6	Trevor Harris	James Butler	Joe Robustelli	Jarell Broxton	Jaylon Hutchings	Nick Anderson	Jamal Peters	Kalil Pimpleton	Mark Vassett	Jaxon Ford	BC Lions
7	Trevor Harris	Deonta McMahon	Dohnte Meyers	Brandon Revenberg	Mike Rose	Adarius Pickett	Destin Talbert	James Letcher Jr.	Sergio Castillo	Patrice René	Montreal Alouettes
8	Bo Levi Mitchell	James Butler	Damonte Coxie	Liam Dobson	Malik Carney	Cameron Judge	Robert Carter Jr.	Isaiah Wooden	Cody Grace	Jacob Bond	Hamilton Tiger-Cats
9	Trevor Harris	Justin Rankin	Kiondré Smith	Kendall Randolph	Willie Jefferson	Jameer Thurman	Tarvarus McFadden	Trey Vaval	Joseph Zema	Brock Mogensen	Saskatchewan Roughriders
10	Vernon Adams Jr.	James Butler	Justin Hardy	Christopher Fortin	Julian Howsare	Jovan Santos-Knox	Cristophe Beaulieu	Kalil Pimpleton	Sergio Castillo	D.K. Bonhomme	Calgary Stampeders
11	Nathan Rourke	Justin Rankin	Keon Hatcher	Jermarcus Hardrick	Brandon Barlow	Micah Awe	Evan Holm	Kalil Pimpleton	Sergio Castillo	Cameron Judge	Saskatchewan Roughriders
12	Trevor Harris	Brady Oliveira	Keon Hatcher	Zack Williams	Mathieu Betts	Tony Jones	Arthur Hamlin	Javon Leake	Joe Couch	Isaac Darkangelo	Montreal Alouettes
13	Zach Collaros	A.J. Ouellette	Kiondré Smith	Zack Williams	Malik Carney	Kyler Fisher	Tevaughn Campbell	Janarion Grant	Mark Vassett	Jayden Dalke	Calgary Stampeders
14	Cody Fajardo	Justin Rankin	Justin McInnis	Cyrille Hogan-Saindon	Julian Howsare	Jovan Santos-Knox	DaShaun Amos	Seven McGee	Mark Vassett	Kordell Jackson	Saskatchewan Roughriders
15	McLeod Bethel-Thompson	Stevie Scott III	Tyson Philpot	Jarell Broxton	Derek Parish	A.J. Allen	Tyrell Ford	Janarion Grant	Lirim Hajrullahu	Isaac Darkangelo	Saskatchewan Roughriders
16	Nathan Rourke	Zander Horvath	Keon Hatcher	Jacob Ruby	Andrew Chatfield Jr.	Adarius Pickett	Deatrick Nichols	Erik Brooks	Marc Liegghio	Jake Kelly	Ottawa Redblacks
17	Zach Collaros	Brady Oliveira	Nic Demski	Christopher Fortin	Bradlee Anae	Brock Mogensen	J.J. Ross	Trey Vaval	Lirim Hajrullahu	Alexandre Gagné	Calgary Stampeders
18	Bo Levi Mitchell	James Butler	Keon Hatcher	Liam Dobson	Julian Howsare	Antoine Brooks Jr.	Jackson Findlay	Kalil Pimpleton	Lirim Hajrullahu	Jack Cassar	Hamilton Tiger-Cats
19	Trevor Harris	Dedrick Mills	Samuel Emilus	Nick Callender	Mike Rose	Najee Murray	Benjie Franklin	Mario Alford	José Maltos Díaz	Marc-Antoine Dequoy	Edmonton Elks
20	Nathan Rourke	Dedrick Mills	Jalen Philpot	Stanley Bryant	Levi Bell	Jaiden Woodbey	DaMarcus Fields	Janarion Grant	Jake Julien	Bubba Bolden	Winnipeg Blue Bombers
21	Cody Fajardo	Greg Bell	Kian Schaffer-Baker	Quinton Barrow	Shawn Oakman	Geoffrey Cantin-Arku	Evan Holm	Kaylon Horton	Marc Liegghio	Robert Panabaker	Ottawa Redblacks

Monthly Honour Roll
Month	Quarterback	Running back	Receiver	Offensive lineman	Defensive lineman	Linebacker	Defensive back	Returner	Kicker/Punter	Special teams	Offensive line
June	Davis Alexander	A.J. Ouellette	Samuel Emilus	Jermarcus Hardrick	Jaylon Hutchings	Geoffrey Cantin-Arku	Cristophe Beaulieu	Javon Leake	Cody Grace	Tyron Vrede	Saskatchewan Roughriders
July	Trevor Harris	James Butler	Damonte Coxie	Coulter Woodmansey	Julian Howsare	Derrick Moncrief	Damon Webb	Isaiah Wooden	Sean Whyte	Bennett Williams	Hamilton Tiger-Cats
August	Vernon Adams Jr.	Justin Rankin	Keon Hatcher	Jarell Broxton	Willie Jefferson	Wynton McManis	Kobe Williams	Trey Vaval	Sergio Castillo	Tyrell Richards	Calgary Stampeders
September	Nathan Rourke	Justin Rankin	Justin McInnis	Jarell Broxton	Clarence Hicks	Jovan Santos-Knox	Kordell Jackson	Seven McGee	Marc Liegghio	Jake Kelly	Saskatchewan Roughriders
October	Trevor Harris	Dedrick Mills	Keon Hatcher	Jermarcus Hardrick	Mike Rose	Najee Murray	Jackson Findlay	Seven McGee	Lirim Hajrullahu	Adam Auclair	Winnipeg Blue Bombers

=== Pro Football Focus ===
Team of the Week
Week	Offence			Defence			Special teams
Week	Backfield	Receivers	Linemen	Primary	Secondary	Backfield	Special teams
1	QB Rourke (BC); RB Mills (CGY)	REC Emilus (SSK); REC Hardy (OTT); REC Addison (OTT); REC Berryhill III (BC); REC Coxie (TOR)	LT Collins (SSK); LG Tate (SSK); C Ferland (SSK); RG Ventrelli (MTL); RT Hardrick (SSK)	Edge Betts (BC); Interior Sanders (SSK); Interior Hendrix (BC); Edge Baldonado (SSK)	CB G. Peters (BC); HB Fields (SSK); LB Beverette (MTL); LB Sankey (MTL); Cover LB Mullen (MTL); HB Amos (HAM); CB Frye (OTT)	S Slywka (TOR)	K Paredes (CGY); P Grace (EDM); Returner Wooden (HAM)
2	QB Streveler (WPG); RB Theis (MTL)	REC Wheatfall (WPG); REC M. Williams (TOR); REC K. Johnson (SSK); REC J. Philpot (CGY); REC Lawler (HAM)	LT Bryant (WPG); LG Lestage (MTL); C Nicastro (TOR); RG Vandal (TOR); RT Hardrick (SSK)	Edge Orimolade (CGY); Interior Uguak (MTL); Interior Tavai (BC); Edge Adeyemi-Berglund (MTL)	CB Greene (CGY); HB Sutton (MTL); LB Cantin-Arku (MTL); LB Santos-Knox (OTT); Cover LB R. Kramdi (WPG); HB Milligan (SSK); CB Moxey (HAM)	S Katsantonis (HAM)	K Maltos Díaz (MTL); P Meyer (BC); Returner T. Vaval (WPG)
3	QB Alexander (MTL); RB Ouellette (SSK)	REC Meyers (SSK); REC Brissett (TOR); REC Spieker (MTL); REC Mital (TOR); REC Wheatfall (WPG)	LT Broxton (BC); LG Korte (EDM); C Fortin (CGY); RG Neufeld (WPG); RT Hardrick (SSK)	Edge Carney (SSK); Interior Sanders (SSK); Interior M. Johnson (SSK); Edge Baldonado (SSK)	CB Burns (MTL); HB Edwards-Cooper (BC); LB Hladik (BC); LB Thurman (SSK); Cover LB D. Williams (BC); HB Nichols (WPG); CB Frye (OTT)	S J. Parker (WPG)	K Castillo (WPG); P Grace (EDM); Returner M. Alford (SSK)
4	QB Collaros (WPG); RB Butler (BC)	REC T. White (HAM); REC Schoen (WPG); REC Demski (WPG); REC Daniels (TOR); REC Eberhardt (BC)	LT Bordner (HAM); LG Fry (SSK); C Woodmansey (HAM); RG Neufeld (WPG); RT Hardrick (SSK)	Edge B. Carter (OTT); Interior D. Adams (WPG); Interior Kendricks Jr. (HAM); Edge Mauldin IV (OTT)	CB T. Campbell (SSK); HB N. Murray (MTL); LB Cantin-Arku (MTL); LB Darkangelo (TOR); Cover LB R. Kramdi (WPG); HB Talbert (HAM); CB M. Sayles (SSK)	S Metchie (EDM)	K Lauther (SSK); P Couch (SSK); Returner M. Alford (SSK)
5	QB Mitchell (HAM); RB Rankin (EDM)	REC Lawler (HAM); REC Mital (TOR); REC McInnis (BC); REC Clercius (WPG); REC Eberhardt (BC)	LT Broxton (BC); LG Vanterpool (WPG); C Woodmansey (HAM); RG Dobson (HAM); RT Coker (CGY)	Edge Howsare (HAM); Interior Ceresna (EDM); Interior Ta'ala (OTT); Edge Garbutt (HAM)	CB Ento (MTL); HB Holm (WPG); LB Moncrief (CGY); LB Hladik (BC); Cover LB Pickett (OTT); HB Arnold II (CGY); CB Bynum (EDM)	S Webb (CGY)	K Ward (OTT); P Constantinou (HAM); Returner Wooden (HAM)
6	None awarded						
7	QB Harris (SSK); RB McMahon (TOR)	REC Meyers (SSK); REC Jones (CGY); REC Demski (WPG); REC Emilus (SSK); REC T. White (HAM)	LT Callender (MTL); LG Revenberg (HAM); C Woodmansey (HAM); RG Ventrelli (MTL); RT Barrow (HAM)	Edge Orimolade (CGY); Interior Rose (SSK); Interior Sambu (CGY); Edge Mauldin IV (OTT)	CB T. Campbell (SSK); HB Talbert (HAM); LB Wilborn (HAM); LB A.J. Allen (SSK); Cover LB Pickett (OTT); HB A. Henderson (OTT); CB McFadden (TOR)	S Webb (CGY)	K Castillo (WPG); P Constantinou (HAM); Returner Letcher Jr. (MTL)
8	QB Mitchell (HAM); RB Butler (BC)	REC K. Smith (HAM); REC Coxie (TOR); REC Emilus (SSK); REC Hatcher (BC); REC K. Johnson (SSK)	LT Callender (MTL); LG Lestage (MTL); C Woodmansey (HAM); RG Dobson (HAM); RT Hardrick (SSK)	Edge Vaughters (WPG); Interior M. Johnson (SSK); Interior C. Sayles (HAM); Edge Carney (SSK)	CB Carter Jr. (BC); HB Milligan (SSK); LB Judge (TOR); LB Wilson (WPG); Cover LB Griffin II (WPG); HB Kent Jr. (BC); CB M. Sayles (SSK)	S Dequoy (MTL)	K Maltos Díaz (MTL); P Grace (EDM); Returner Wooden (HAM)
9	QB Harris (SSK); RB Rankin (EDM)	REC K. Smith (SSK); REC Lewis (OTT); REC Coxie (TOR); REC Demski (WPG); REC Meyers (SSK)	LT Collins (SSK); LG Fry (SSK); C Ferland (SSK); RG Brammer (SSK); RT Randolph (WPG)	Edge Jefferson (WPG); Interior Sanders (SSK); Interior Wakefield (OTT); Edge Mauldin IV (OTT)	CB McFadden (TOR); HB A. Henderson (OTT); LB Thurman (SSK); LB McManis (TOR); Cover LB Reavis (SSK); HB Nichols (WPG); CB Parker Jr. (WPG)	S B. Williams (OTT)	K Castillo (WPG); P Zema (MTL); Returner T. Vaval (WPG)
10	None awarded						
11	QB Rourke (BC); RB Rankin (EDM)	REC Hatcher (BC); REC K. Johnson (SSK); REC Demski (WPG); REC Snead (MTL); REC Dunbar Jr. (EDM)	LT Broxton (BC); LG Dumoulin Duguay (HAM); C Nicastro (TOR); RG Manning (BC); RT Hardrick (SSK)	Edge Barlow (EDM); Interior Tavai (BC); Interior Ceresna (EDM); Edge Adeyemi-Berglund (MTL)	CB G. Peters (BC); HB Holm (WPG); LB Awe (BC); LB Beverette (MTL); Cover LB Reavis (SSK); HB Talbert (HAM); CB Ford (EDM)	S Lokombo (SSK)	K Castillo (WPG); P Sheahan (WPG); Returner K. Pimpleton (OTT)
12	QB Adams Jr. (CGY); RB Oliveira (WPG)	REC Hatcher (BC); REC Herslow (TOR); REC Mital (TOR); REC Baldwin (CGY); REC K. Johnson (SSK)	LT Callender (MTL); LG Williams (CGY); C Beard (EDM); RG Neufeld (WPG); RT Coker (CGY)	Edge Betts (BC); Interior Ceresna (EDM); Interior Wakefield (OTT); Edge Hicks (CGY)	CB G. Onyeka (CGY); HB K. Williams (EDM); LB T. Jones (WPG); LB Thurman (SSK); Cover LB Pickett (OTT); HB Heslop (OTT); CB T. Vaval (WPG)	S Hamlin (MTL)	K Blanchard (EDM); P Couch (SSK); Returner J. Leake (EDM)
13	QB Arbuckle (TOR); RB Brown (TOR)	REC K. Smith (HAM); REC Lawler (HAM); REC Brissett (TOR); REC Barnes (CGY); REC Demski (WPG)	LT Bryant (WPG); LG Williams (CGY); C Nicastro (TOR); RG Brammer (SSK); RT Barrow (HAM)	Edge Carney (SSK); Interior Hutchings (CGY); Interior Fox (HAM); Edge Barlow (EDM)	CB T. Campbell (SSK); HB Fields (SSK); LB Fisher (HAM); LB McManis (TOR); Cover LB C. Garnes (EDM); HB K. Williams (EDM); CB Franklin (TOR)	S Webb (CGY)	K Paredes (CGY); P Vassett (CGY); Returner J. Grant (TOR)
14	QB Fajardo (EDM); RB Rankin (EDM)	REC McInnis (BC); REC Demski (WPG); REC O. Wilson (WPG); REC K. Johnson (SSK); REC Brooks (CGY)	LT Callender (MTL); LG Fry (SSK); C Hogan-Saindon (MTL); RG Dobson (HAM); RT Hardrick (SSK)	Edge Howsare (HAM); Interior J. Williams (EDM); Interior J. Thomas (WPG); Edge Carney (SSK)	CB Moxey (HAM); HB Amos (HAM); LB Santos-Knox (OTT); LB McManis (TOR); Cover LB Stubblefield (HAM); HB Fields (SSK); CB Ento (MTL)	S R. Kramdi (WPG)	K Blanchard (EDM); P Vassett (CGY); Returner S. McGee (BC)
15	QB Bethel-Thompson (MTL); RB Scott III (MTL)	REC T. Philpot (MTL); REC Hatcher (BC); REC Hardy (OTT); REC Addison (OTT); REC Herslow (TOR)	LT Broxton (BC); LG Lestage (MTL); C Ferland (SSK); RG Brammer (SSK); RT Hardrick (SSK)	Edge Parish (TOR); Interior Tavai (BC); Interior Brinkman (EDM); Edge N. Taylor (EDM)	CB J. Peters (HAM); HB D. Williams (BC); LB A.J. Allen (SSK); LB Beverette (MTL); Cover LB R. Kramdi (WPG); HB Sutton (MTL); CB Ford (EDM)	S Bratton (TOR)	K Hajrullahu (TOR); P Julien (EDM); Returner J. Grant (TOR)
16	QB Rourke (BC); RB Horvath (BC)	REC Hatcher (BC); REC Lewis (OTT); REC Jones (CGY); REC Hardy (OTT); REC McInnis (BC)	LT Boyd (OTT); LG Carson (OTT); C Beard (EDM); RG Ruby (OTT); RT Barrow (HAM)	Edge Hicks (CGY); Interior Tavai (BC); Interior Hutchings (CGY); Edge Chatfield Jr. (TOR)	CB Burns (MTL); HB Nichols (WPG); LB Santos-Knox (OTT); LB Beverette (MTL); Cover LB Pickett (OTT); HB Sutton (MTL); CB Moxey (HAM)	S K. Jackson (EDM)	K Liegghio (HAM); P Gettman (OTT); Returner T. Vaval (WPG)
17	QB Collaros (WPG); RB Oliveira (WPG)	REC Demski (WPG); REC Snead (MTL); REC Gittens Jr. (EDM); REC Mitchell (WPG); REC Herslow (TOR)	LT Broxton (BC); LG Revenberg (HAM); C Fortin (CGY); RG Brammer (SSK); RT Hardrick (SSK)	Edge Anae (BC); Interior Tavai (BC); Interior Hutchings (CGY); Edge Betts (BC)	CB Ross (EDM); HB Talbert (HAM); LB Mogensen (EDM); LB Beverette (MTL); Cover LB Logan Jr. (EDM); HB K. Williams (EDM); CB Ento (MTL)	S C. Garnes (EDM)	K Hajrullahu (TOR); P Julien (EDM); Returner T. Vaval (WPG)
18	QB Mitchell (HAM); RB Butler (BC)	REC Meyers (SSK); REC Hatcher (BC); REC Cottoy (BC); REC Polk (TOR); REC O'Leary-Orange (HAM)	LT Collins (SSK); LG Revenberg (HAM); C Nicastro (TOR); RG Dobson (HAM); RT Hardrick (SSK)	Edge Carney (SSK); Interior Rose (SSK); Interior Sanders (SSK); Edge Howsare (HAM)	CB G. Peters (BC); HB Milligan (SSK); LB Awe (BC); LB Teitz (CGY); Cover LB Brooks Jr. (SSK); HB Talbert (HAM); CB Moxey (HAM)	S Katsantonis (HAM)	K Hajrullahu (TOR); P Constantinou (HAM); Returner K. Pimpleton (OTT)
19	QB Harris (SSK); RB Mills (CGY)	REC Emilus (SSK); REC Lawler (HAM); REC Schaffer-Baker (SSK); REC Mack (MTL); REC T. White (HAM)	LT Callender (MTL); LG Williams (CGY); C Beard (EDM); RG Neufeld (WPG); RT Boyko (EDM)	Edge Hicks (CGY); Interior Rose (SSK); Interior Pelley (TOR); Edge Baldonado (SSK)	CB Franklin (TOR); HB K. Jackson (EDM); LB Casey (TOR); LB Cantin-Arku (MTL); Cover LB N. Murray (MTL); HB Nichols (WPG); CB Sapp III (SSK)	S Slywka (TOR)	K Maltos Díaz (MTL); P Haggerty (TOR); Returner M. Alford (SSK)
20	QB Rourke (BC); RB Mills (CGY)	REC J. Philpot (CGY); REC Hatcher (BC); REC Snead (MTL); REC Mack (MTL); REC Gittens Jr. (EDM)	LT Bryant (WPG); LG Richards (TOR); C Kolankowski (WPG); RG Nkanu (CGY); RT Randolph (WPG)	Edge Bell (BC); Interior Hutchings (CGY); Interior J. Thomas (WPG); Edge Barlow (EDM)	CB Burns (MTL); HB Fields (SSK); LB Woodbey (WPG); LB Roberts (CGY); Cover LB Moncrief (CGY); HB Nichols (WPG); CB Carter Jr. (BC)	S C. Allen (WPG)	K Maltos Díaz (MTL); P Julien (EDM); Returner J. Grant (TOR)
21	QB Rourke (BC); RB Bell (HAM)	REC Schaffer-Baker (SSK); REC Brooks (CGY); REC Eberhardt (BC); REC Hatcher (BC); REC K. Smith (HAM)	LT Broxton (BC); LG Lestage (MTL); C Godber (OTT); RG Dobson (HAM); RT Barrow (HAM)	Edge Bell (BC); Interior Oakman (MTL); Interior T. Johnson (EDM); Edge Betts (BC)	CB Ento (MTL); HB Holm (WPG); LB Cantin-Arku (MTL); LB B. Hill (HAM); Cover LB Stubblefield (HAM); HB Amos (HAM); CB Bridges (BC)	S Lokombo (SSK)	K Liegghio (HAM); P Julien (EDM); Returner S. McGee (BC)

Players of the Week
Week	Quarterback	Offensive Player	Offensive Line	Pass-Rusher	Run Defender	Coverage Player
1	Nathan Rourke	Samuel Emilus	Saskatchewan Roughriders	Mathieu Betts	Adarius Pickett	Garry Peters
2	Chris Streveler	Travis Theis	Saskatchewan Roughriders	Folarin Orimolade	Jovan Santos-Knox	Adrian Greene
3	Davis Alexander	Dohnte Meyers	Calgary Stampeders	Malik Carney	Jameer Thurman	Lorenzo Burns
4	Zach Collaros	James Butler	Hamilton Tiger-Cats	Malik Carney	Jovan Santos-Knox	Tevaughn Campbell
5	Bo Levi Mitchell	Kenny Lawler	Hamilton Tiger-Cats	Julian Howsare	Tony Jones	Damon Webb
6	None awarded					
7	Trevor Harris	Nic Demski	Montreal Alouettes	Jaylon Hutchings	Justin Sambu	Destin Talbert
8	Bo Levi Mitchell	James Butler	Hamilton Tiger-Cats	Malik Carney	Kyrie Wilson	Robert Carter Jr.
9	Trevor Harris	Kiondré Smith	Saskatchewan Roughriders	Willie Jefferson	Jovan Santos-Knox	Tarvarus McFadden
10	None awarded					
11	Nathan Rourke	Justin Rankin	Winnipeg Blue Bombers	Brandon Barlow	Darnell Sankey	Garry Peters
12	Vernon Adams Jr.	Brady Oliveira	Montreal Alouettes	Mathieu Betts	Damon Webb	Jameer Thurman
13	Nick Arbuckle	Kiondré Smith	Calgary Stampeders	Jaylon Hutchings	Malik Carney	Tevaughn Campbell
14	Cody Fajardo	Justin Rankin	Saskatchewan Roughriders	Julian Howsare	Malik Carney	DaShaun Amos
15	McLeod Bethel-Thompson	Tyson Philpot	Saskatchewan Roughriders	Derek Parish	Royce Metchie	Jamal Peters
16	Nathan Rourke	Keon Hatcher	Ottawa Redblacks	Andrew Chatfield Jr.	Najee Murray	Deatrick Nichols
17	Zach Collaros	Brady Oliveira	Calgary Stampeders	Mathieu Betts	Wesley Sutton	Kabion Ento
18	Bo Levi Mitchell	Dohnte Meyers	Saskatchewan Roughriders	Julian Howsare	Jaylon Hutchings	Stavros Katsantonis
19	Trevor Harris	Samuel Emilus	Edmonton Elks	Mike Rose	Aaron Casey	Deatrick Nichols
20	Nathan Rourke	Dedrick Mills	Winnipeg Blue Bombers	Levi Bell	Joel Dublanko	Lorenzo Burns
21	Nathan Rourke	Erik Brooks	Hamilton Tiger-Cats	Clarence Hicks	Shawn Oakman	Evan Holm

PFF 2025 midseason all-CFL team
Position	First Team	Second Team
Offence
Quarterback	Trevor Harris (Saskatchewan Roughriders)	Nathan Rourke (BC Lions)
Running Back	James Butler (BC Lions)	A.J. Ouellette (Saskatchewan Roughriders)
Receiver	KeeSean Johnson (Saskatchewan Roughriders)	Nic Demski (Winnipeg Blue Bombers)
Receiver	Damonte Coxie (Toronto Argonauts)	Tyler Snead (Montreal Alouettes)
Receiver	Keon Hatcher (BC Lions)	Dominique Rhymes (Calgary Stampeders)
Receiver	Dohnte Meyers (Saskatchewan Roughriders)	Kiondré Smith (Hamilton Tiger-Cats)
Receiver	Kenny Lawler (Hamilton Tiger-Cats)	Geno Lewis (Ottawa Redblacks)
Left Tackle	Jarell Broxton (BC Lions)	Nick Callender (Montreal Alouettes)
Left Guard	Pier-Olivier Lestage (Montreal Alouettes)	Brandon Revenberg (Hamilton Tiger-Cats)
Center	Coulter Woodmansey (Hamilton Tiger-Cats)	Christopher Fortin (Calgary Stampeders)
Right Guard	Liam Dobson (Hamilton Tiger-Cats)	Patrick Neufeld (Winnipeg Blue Bombers)
Right Tackle	Jermarcus Hardrick (Saskatchewan Roughriders)	Joshua Coker (Calgary Stampeders)
Defence
Interior	Jaylon Hutchings (Calgary Stampeders)	Jonah Tavai (BC Lions)
Interior	Mike Rose (Saskatchewan Roughriders)	Miles Fox (Hamilton Tiger-Cats)
Edge	Malik Carney (Saskatchewan Roughriders)	Willie Jefferson (Winnipeg Blue Bombers)
Edge	Folarin Orimolade (Calgary Stampeders)	Mathieu Betts (BC Lions)
Linebacker	Tyrice Beverette (Montreal Alouettes)	Geoffrey Cantin-Arku (Montreal Alouettes)
Linebacker	Jovan Santos-Knox (Ottawa Redblacks)	Wynton McManis (Toronto Argonauts)
Cover LB	Derrick Moncrief (Calgary Stampeders)	C.J. Reavis (Saskatchewan Roughriders)
Cornerback	Tevaughn Campbell (Saskatchewan Roughriders)	Tyrell Ford (Edmonton Elks)
Cornerback	Adrian Greene (Calgary Stampeders)	Tarvarus McFadden (Toronto Argonauts)
Halfback	Destin Talbert (Hamilton Tiger-Cats)	Jaydon Grant (Calgary Stampeders)
Halfback	Rolan Milligan (Saskatchewan Roughriders)	Evan Holm (Winnipeg Blue Bombers)
Free Safety	Stavros Katsantonis (Hamilton Tiger-Cats)	Cristophe Beaulieu (BC Lions)
Special Teams
Kicker	Sergio Castillo (Winnipeg Blue Bombers)	José Maltos Díaz (Montreal Alouettes)
Punter	Nik Constantinou (Hamilton Tiger-Cats)	Cody Grace (Edmonton Elks)
Long Snapper	Jorgen Hus (Saskatchewan Roughriders)	Luke Burton-Krahn (Edmonton Elks)
Kick Returner	Isaiah Wooden (Hamilton Tiger-Cats)	Mario Alford (Saskatchewan Roughriders)
Punt Returner	Kalil Pimpleton (Ottawa Redblacks)	Javon Leake (Edmonton Elks)
Special Teams	Alexandre Gagné (Montreal Alouettes)	Tyron Vrede (Ottawa Redblacks)

PFF 2025 CFL midseason awards
Award	Winner	Honourable mentions
Most Outstanding Player	Trevor Harris (Saskatchewan Roughriders)	Nathan Rourke (BC Lions); James Butler (BC Lions); Jaylon Hutchings (Calgary Stampeders)
Most Outstanding Defensive Player	Jaylon Hutchings (Calgary Stampeders)	Malik Carney (Saskatchewan Roughriders); Tevaughn Campbell (Saskatchewan Roughriders); Stavros Katsantonis (Hamilton Tiger-Cats)
Most Outstanding Rookie	Christopher Fortin (Calgary Stampeders)	Derek Slywka (Toronto Argonauts); Damien Alford (Calgary Stampeders); Travis Theis (Montreal Alouettes)
Most Outstanding Canadian	Nathan Rourke (BC Lions)	Tevaughn Campbell (Saskatchewan Roughriders); Stavros Katsantonis (Hamilton Tiger-Cats); Adrian Greene (Calgary Stampeders)
Most Outstanding Offensive Lineman	Jermarcus Hardrick (Saskatchewan Roughriders)	Jarell Broxton (BC Lions); Coulter Woodmansey (Hamilton Tiger-Cats); Nick Callender (Montreal Alouettes)
John Agro Special Teams Award	Isaiah Wooden (Hamilton Tiger-Cats)	Sergio Castillo (Winnipeg Blue Bombers); José Maltos Díaz (Montreal Alouettes); Alexandre Gagné (Montreal Alouettes)
Annis Stukus Trophy (Coach of the Year)	Dave Dickenson (Calgary Stampeders)	Corey Mace (Saskatchewan Roughriders); Scott Milanovich (Hamilton Tiger-Cats)

PFF 2025 All-CFL team
Position	First Team	Second Team
Offence
Quarterback	Nathan Rourke (BC Lions)	Trevor Harris (Saskatchewan Roughriders)
Running Back	Justin Rankin (Edmonton Elks)	James Butler (BC Lions)
Wide Receiver	Keon Hatcher (BC Lions)	Justin McInnis (BC Lions)
Wide Receiver	KeeSean Johnson (Saskatchewan Roughriders)	Damonte Coxie (Toronto Argonauts)
Wide Receiver	Kenny Lawler (Hamilton Tiger-Cats)	Dohnte Meyers (Saskatchewan Roughriders)
Wide Receiver	Nic Demski (Winnipeg Blue Bombers)	Kiondré Smith (Hamilton Tiger-Cats)
Wide Receiver	Tyler Snead (Montreal Alouettes)	Justin Hardy (Ottawa Redblacks)
Left Tackle	Jarell Broxton (BC Lions)	Nick Callender (Montreal Alouettes)
Left Guard	Brandon Revenberg (Hamilton Tiger-Cats)	Pier-Olivier Lestage (Montreal Alouettes)
Center	Coulter Woodmansey (Hamilton Tiger-Cats)	Logan Ferland (Saskatchewan Roughriders)
Right Guard	Liam Dobson (Hamilton Tiger-Cats)	Patrick Neufeld (Winnipeg Blue Bombers)
Right Tackle	Jermarcus Hardrick (Saskatchewan Roughriders)	Joshua Coker (Calgary Stampeders)
Defence
Interior	Jaylon Hutchings (Calgary Stampeders)	Caleb Sanders (Saskatchewan Roughriders)
Interior	Jonah Tavai (BC Lions)	Mike Rose (Saskatchewan Roughriders)
Edge	Julian Howsare (Hamilton Tiger-Cats)	Mathieu Betts (BC Lions)
Edge	Malik Carney (Saskatchewan Roughriders)	Clarence Hicks (Calgary Stampeders)
Linebacker	Tyrice Beverette (Montreal Alouettes)	Tony Jones (Winnipeg Blue Bombers)
Linebacker	Jovan Santos-Knox (Ottawa Redblacks)	Wynton McManis (Toronto Argonauts)
Cover LB	Redha Kramdi (Winnipeg Blue Bombers)	Adarius Pickett (Ottawa Redblacks)
Cornerback	Tevaughn Campbell (Saskatchewan Roughriders)	Kabion Ento (Montreal Alouettes)
Cornerback	Jonathan Moxey (Hamilton Tiger-Cats)	Lorenzo Burns (Montreal Alouettes)
Halfback	Destin Talbert (Hamilton Tiger-Cats)	Rolan Milligan (Saskatchewan Roughriders)
Halfback	Deatrick Nichols (Winnipeg Blue Bombers)	Jaydon Grant (Calgary Stampeders)
Free Safety	Cristophe Beaulieu (BC Lions)	Stavros Katsantonis (Hamilton Tiger-Cats)
Special Teams
Kicker	Lirim Hajrullahu (Toronto Argonauts)	José Maltos Díaz (Montreal Alouettes)
Punter	Nik Constantinou (Hamilton Tiger-Cats)	Mark Vassett (Calgary Stampeders)
Long Snapper	Luke Burton-Krahn (Edmonton Elks)	Gordon Whyte (Hamilton Tiger-Cats)
Returner	Trey Vaval (Winnipeg Blue Bombers)	Isaiah Wooden (Hamilton Tiger-Cats)
Special Teams	Alexandre Gagné (Montreal Alouettes)	Michael Ayers (Winnipeg Blue Bombers)

PFF 2025 CFL awards
Award	Winner	Honourable mentions
Most Outstanding Player	Nathan Rourke (BC Lions)	Trevor Harris (Saskatchewan Roughriders); Bo Levi Mitchell (Hamilton Tiger-Cats); Jaylon Hutchings (Calgary Stampeders)
Most Outstanding Defensive Player	Jaylon Hutchings (Calgary Stampeders)	Julian Howsare (Hamilton Tiger-Cats); Tyrice Beverette (Montreal Alouettes); Clarence Hicks (Calgary Stampeders); Tevaughn Campbell (Saskatchewan Roughriders)
Most Outstanding Rookie	Trey Vaval (Winnipeg Blue Bombers)	Robert Carter Jr. (BC Lions); Jaydon Grant (Calgary Stampeders); Christopher Fortin (Calgary Stampeders); Derek Slywka (Toronto Argonauts)
Most Outstanding Canadian	Nathan Rourke (BC Lions)	Mathieu Betts (BC Lions); Tevaughn Campbell (Saskatchewan Roughriders); Nic Demski (Winnipeg Blue Bombers)
Most Outstanding Offensive Lineman	Jermarcus Hardrick (Saskatchewan Roughriders)	Jarell Broxton (BC Lions); Nick Callender (Montreal Alouettes); Liam Dobson (Hamilton Tiger-Cats)
John Agro Special Teams Award	Lirim Hajrullahu (Toronto Argonauts)	Trey Vaval (Winnipeg Blue Bombers); José Maltos Díaz (Montreal Alouettes); Isaiah Wooden (Hamilton Tiger-Cats)
Annis Stukus Trophy (Coach of the Year)	Corey Mace (Saskatchewan Roughriders)	Dave Dickenson (Calgary Stampeders); Scott Milanovich (Hamilton Tiger-Cats)

=== 3DownNation ===
Best of the Week
Week	Offensive Player	Defensive Player	Special Teams Player	Breakout Player	Offensive Line	Coach
1	Nathan Rourke	Marquel Lee	Alexandre Gagné	Stanley Berryhill III	Saskatchewan Roughriders	Dave Dickenson
2	KeeSean Johnson	Dylan Wynn	José Maltos Díaz	Matthew Peterson	Winnipeg Blue Bombers	Jason Hogan
3	Davis Alexander	Jamal Parker	Mario Alford	Kevin Mital	Ottawa Redblacks	Jason Maas
4	Zach Collaros	Andrew Chatfield Jr.	Joe Couch	Derek Slywka	Winnipeg Blue Bombers	Brent Monson
5	Kenny Lawler	Damon Webb	Isaiah Wooden	Isaiah Wooden	Edmonton Elks	Scott Milanovich
6	James Butler	Jaylon Hutchings	Cody Grace	Damien Alford	Calgary Stampeders	Mike Benevides
7	Trevor Harris	Stavros Katsantonis	Mark Vassett	Ray Wilborn	Saskatchewan Roughriders	Bob Slowik
8	Bo Levi Mitchell	Malik Carney	José Maltos Díaz	Robert Carter Jr.	Hamilton Tiger-Cats	Scott Milanovich
9	Damonte Coxie	Willie Jefferson	Trey Vaval	Trey Vaval	Hamilton Tiger-Cats	Marc Mueller
10	Dru Brown	Isaac Adeyemi-Berglund	Sergio Castillo	Jacob Roberts	Hamilton Tiger-Cats	Tommy Condell
11	Keon Hatcher	Micah Johnson	Kalil Pimpleton	Tanner Schmekel	Edmonton Elks	Corey Mace
12	Nick Arbuckle	Clarence Hicks	Javon Leake	Jake Herslow	Calgary Stampeders	Ryan Dinwiddie
13	Kenny Lawler	Jacob Roberts	Tyler Ternowski	Erik Brooks	Calgary Stampeders	Bob Slowik
14	Justin Rankin	Jonah Tavai	Mark Vassett	Seven McGee	Hamilton Tiger-Cats	Mark Kilam
15	Tyson Philpot	Mathieu Betts	Lirim Hajrullahu	Joel Dublanko	Montreal Alouettes	Jason Maas
16	Nathan Rourke	Adarius Pickett	Trey Vaval	Zander Horvath	BC Lions	Buck Pierce
17	Zach Collaros	Mathieu Betts	Trey Vaval	Brock Mogensen	Winnipeg Blue Bombers	Mike O'Shea
18	Bo Levi Mitchell	Julian Howsare	Lirim Hajrullahu	Philip Ossai	Hamilton Tiger-Cats	Buck Pierce
19	Samuel Emilus	Marc-Antoine Dequoy	José Maltos Díaz	Ludovick Choquette	Calgary Stampeders	Pat DelMonaco
20	Dedrick Mills	Antoine Brooks Jr.	Ben Hladik	Stevie Scott III	BC Lions	Mike Benevides
21	Nathan Rourke	Jacob Roberts	Jake Julien	Braxton Hill	Hamilton Tiger-Cats	Brent Monson

2025 mid-season all-star teams
—	Offence			Defence			Special teams
—	Backfield	Receivers	Linemen	Primary	Secondary	Backfield	Special teams
First Team	FB (Canada) Dallaire (MTL); QB (United States) Mitchell (HAM); RB (United States) Butler (BC)	WR (United States) Lawler (HAM); WR (United States) Coxie (TOR); WR (United States) Hatcher (BC); WR (United States) Lewis (OTT); WR (United States) Johnson (SSK)	LT (United States) Bordner (HAM); LG (Canada) Lestage (MTL); C (Canada) Ferland (SSK); RG (Canada) Dobson (HAM); RT (United States) Hardrick (SSK)	Edge (United States) Orimolade (CGY); Interior (United States) Hutchings (CGY); Interior (United States) Oakman (MTL); Edge (United States) Carney (SSK)	CB (Canada) Greene (CGY); HB (United States) Talbert (HAM); LB (United States) Beverette (MTL); LB (United States) Thurman (SSK); Cover LB (United States) Moncrief (CGY); HB (United States) Milligan Jr. (SSK); CB (United States) Peters (HAM)	S (Canada) Katsantonis (HAM)	K (Mexico) Maltos Díaz (MTL); P (South Africa) Meyer (BC); LS (Canada) Burton-Krahn (EDM); Returner (United States) Wooden (HAM); Special Teams (Canada) Richards (MTL)
Second Team	FB (Canada) Milanovic-Litre (HAM); QB (United States) Adams Jr. (CGY); RB (United States) Mills (CGY)	WR (United States) Meyers (SSK); WR (Canada) Smith (HAM); WR (Canada) Demski (WPG); WR (Canada) Alford (CGY); WR (United States) White (HAM)	LT (United States) Broxton (BC); LG (Canada) Williams (CGY); C (Canada) Woodmansey (HAM); RG (United States) Brammer (SSK); RT (United States) Coker (CGY)	Edge (United States) Jefferson (WPG); Interior (United States) Rose (SSK); Interior (United States) Johnson (SSK); Edge (United States) Howsare (HAM)	CB (Canada) Campbell (SSK); HB (United States) Amos (TOR); LB (United States) Awe (BC); LB (United States) Roberts (CGY); Cover LB (United States) Pickett (OTT); HB (United States) Grant (CGY); CB (United States) Sayles (SSK)	S (United States) Webb (CGY)	K (United States) Castillo (WPG); P (Australia) Grace (EDM); LS (Canada) Bourassa (MTL); Returner (United States) Pimpleton (OTT); Special Teams (Canada) René (BC)

2025 mid-season CFL award winners
Award	Winner	Runner-ups
Most Outstanding Player	Bo Levi Mitchell (Hamilton Tiger-Cats)	Vernon Adams Jr. (Calgary Stampeders); Kenny Lawler (Hamilton Tiger-Cats)
Most Outstanding Defensive Player	Jaylon Hutchings (Calgary Stampeders)	Jameer Thurman (Saskatchewan Roughriders); Derrick Moncrief (Calgary Stampeders)
Most Outstanding Canadian	Nathan Rourke (BC Lions)	Stavros Katsantonis (Hamilton Tiger-Cats); Adrian Greene (Calgary Stampeders)
Most Outstanding Offensive Lineman	Jermarcus Hardrick (Saskatchewan Roughriders)	Logan Ferland (Saskatchewan Roughriders); Pier-Olivier Lestage (Montreal Alouettes)
Most Outstanding Special Teams Player	Isaiah Wooden (Hamilton Tiger-Cats)	José Maltos Díaz (Montreal Alouettes); Kalil Pimpleton (Ottawa Redblacks)
Most Outstanding Rookie	Derek Slywka (Toronto Argonauts)	Christopher Fortin (Calgary Stampeders); Travis Theis (Montreal Alouettes)
Coach of the Year	Corey Mace (Saskatchewan Roughriders)	Scott Milanovich (Hamilton Tiger-Cats); Dave Dickenson (Calgary Stampeders)

2025 all-star teams
—	Offence			Defence			Special teams
—	Backfield	Receivers	Linemen	Primary	Secondary	Backfield	Special teams
First Team	FB (Jamaica) Robinson (HAM); QB (Canada) Rourke (BC); RB (United States) Mills (CGY)	WR (United States) Lawler (HAM); WR (United States) Johnson (SSK); WR (United States) Hatcher (BC); WR (Canada) McInnis (BC); WR (Canada) Demski (WPG)	LT (United States) Broxton (BC); LG (Canada) Williams (CGY); C (Canada) Woodmansey (HAM); RG (Canada) Dobson (HAM); RT (United States) Hardrick (SSK)	Edge (Canada) Betts (BC); Interior (United States) Hutchings (CGY); Interior (United States) Tavai (BC); Edge (United States) Howsare (HAM)	CB (Canada) Campbell (SSK); HB (United States) Milligan Jr. (SSK); LB (United States) Jones (WPG); LB (United States) Beverette (MTL); Cover LB (United States) Moncrief (CGY); HB (United States) Talbert (HAM); CB (United States) Ento (MTL)	S (Canada) Katsantonis (HAM)	K (Canada) Hajrullahu (TOR); P (Australia) Vassett (CGY); LS (Canada) Burton-Krahn (EDM); Returner (United States) Vaval (WPG); Special Teams (Canada) Richards (MTL)
Second Team	FB (Canada) Milanovic-Litre (HAM); QB (United States) Mitchell (HAM); RB (United States) Rankin (EDM)	WR (United States) Snead (MTL); WR (United States) Meyers (SSK); WR (United States) Coxie (TOR); WR (Canada) Smith (HAM); WR (United States) Hardy (OTT)	LT (United States) Callender (MTL); LG (Canada) Revenberg (HAM); C (Canada) Ferland (SSK); RG (Canada) Lestage (MTL); RT (United States) Bryant (WPG)	Edge (United States) Carney (SSK); Interior (United States) Rose (SSK); Interior (United States) Johnson (SSK); Edge (United States) Orimolade (CGY)	CB (United States) Ross (EDM); HB (United States) Nichols (WPG); LB (United States) Thurman (SSK); LB (United States) McManis (TOR); Cover LB (United States) Pickett (OTT); HB (United States) Amos (HAM); CB (United States) Peters (HAM)	S (Canada) Beaulieu (BC)	K (Canada) Liegghio (HAM); P (Australia) Zema (MTL); LS (Canada) Bourassa (MTL); Returner (United States) Wooden (HAM); Special Teams (United States) Darkangelo (TOR)

2025 CFL award winners
Award	Winner	Runner-ups
Most Outstanding Player	Nathan Rourke (BC Lions)	Bo Levi Mitchell (Hamilton Tiger-Cats); Justin Rankin (Edmonton Elks)
Most Outstanding Defensive Player	Jaylon Hutchings (Calgary Stampeders)	Tyrice Beverette (Montreal Alouettes); Julian Howsare (Hamilton Tiger-Cats)
Most Outstanding Canadian	Nathan Rourke (BC Lions)	Mathieu Betts (BC Lions); Tevaughn Campbell (Saskatchewan Roughriders)
Most Outstanding Offensive Lineman	Jermarcus Hardrick (Saskatchewan Roughriders)	Jarell Broxton (BC Lions); Liam Dobson (Hamilton Tiger-Cats)
Most Outstanding Special Teams Player	Trey Vaval (Winnipeg Blue Bombers)	Lirim Hajrullahu (Toronto Argonauts); Tyrell Richards (Montreal Alouettes)
Most Outstanding Rookie	Trey Vaval (Winnipeg Blue Bombers)	Robert Carter Jr. (BC Lions); Christopher Fortin (Calgary Stampeders)
Coach of the Year	Corey Mace (Saskatchewan Roughriders)	Buck Pierce (BC Lions); Dave Dickenson (Calgary Stampeders)

== 2025 All-CFL teams ==
=== 2025 All-CFL team ===
==== Offence ====
- QB – Nathan Rourke, BC Lions
- RB – Dedrick Mills, Calgary Stampeders
- R – Justin McInnis, BC Lions
- R – Keon Hatcher, BC Lions
- R – Kenny Lawler, Hamilton Tiger-Cats
- R – KeeSean Johnson, Saskatchewan Roughriders
- R – Tyler Snead, Montreal Alouettes
- OT – Jermarcus Hardrick, Saskatchewan Roughriders
- OT – Jarell Broxton, BC Lions
- OG – Jacob Brammer, Saskatchewan Roughriders
- OG – Brandon Revenberg, Hamilton Tiger-Cats
- C – Logan Ferland, Saskatchewan Roughriders

==== Defence ====
- DT – Jaylon Hutchings, Calgary Stampeders
- DT – Micah Johnson, Saskatchewan Roughriders
- DE – Mathieu Betts, BC Lions
- DE – Julian Howsare, Hamilton Tiger-Cats
- LB – Tyrice Beverette, Montreal Alouettes
- LB – Jameer Thurman, Saskatchewan Roughriders
- CLB – C.J. Reavis, Saskatchewan Roughriders
- CB – Tevaughn Campbell, Saskatchewan Roughriders
- CB – Jamal Peters, Hamilton Tiger-Cats
- HB – Rolan Milligan, Saskatchewan Roughriders
- HB – Evan Holm, Winnipeg Blue Bombers
- S – Stavros Katsantonis, Hamilton Tiger-Cats

==== Special teams ====
- K – Lirim Hajrullahu, Toronto Argonauts
- P – Mark Vassett, Calgary Stampeders
- ST – Trey Vaval, Winnipeg Blue Bombers

=== 2025 Western All-CFL team ===
==== Offence ====
- QB – Nathan Rourke, BC Lions
- RB – Dedrick Mills, Calgary Stampeders
- R – Justin McInnis, BC Lions
- R – Dohnte Meyers, Saskatchewan Roughriders
- R – Keon Hatcher, BC Lions
- R – KeeSean Johnson, Saskatchewan Roughriders
- R – Nic Demski, Winnipeg Blue Bombers
- OT – Jarell Broxton, BC Lions
- OT – Jermarcus Hardrick, Saskatchewan Roughriders
- OG – Jacob Brammer, Saskatchewan Roughriders
- OG – Zack Williams, Calgary Stampeders
- C – Logan Ferland, Saskatchewan

==== Defence ====
- DT – Jaylon Hutchings, Calgary Stampeders
- DT – Micah Johnson, Saskatchewan Roughriders
- DE – Mathieu Betts, BC Lions
- DE – Clarence Hicks, Calgary Stampeders
- LB – Jameer Thurman, Saskatchewan Roughriders
- LB – Tony Jones, Winnipeg Blue Bombers
- CLB – C.J. Reavis, Saskatchewan Roughriders
- CB – Tevaughn Campbell, Saskatchewan Roughriders
- CB – Adrian Greene, Calgary Stampeders
- HB – Rolan Milligan, Saskatchewan Roughriders
- HB – Evan Holm, Winnipeg Blue Bombers
- S – Damon Webb, Calgary Stampeders

==== Special teams ====
- K – Sean Whyte, BC Lions
- P – Mark Vassett, Calgary Stampeders
- ST – Trey Vaval, Winnipeg Blue Bombers

=== 2025 Eastern All-CFL team ===
==== Offence ====
- QB – Bo Levi Mitchell, Hamilton Tiger-Cats
- RB – Greg Bell, Hamilton Tiger-Cats
- R – Justin Hardy, Ottawa Redblacks
- R – Kenny Lawler, Hamilton Tiger-Cats
- R – Kiondre Smith, Hamilton Tiger-Cats
- R – Eugene Lewis, Ottawa Redblacks
- R – Tyler Snead, Montreal Alouettes
- OT – Quinton Barrow, Hamilton Tiger-Cats
- OT – Nick Callender, Montreal Alouettes
- OG – Brandon Revenberg, Hamilton Tiger-Cats
- OG – Pier-Olivier Lestage, Montreal Alouettes
- C – Justin Lawrence, Montreal Alouettes

==== Defence ====
- DT – Casey Sayles, Hamilton Tiger-Cats
- DT – Shawn Oakman, Montreal Alouettes
- DE – Julian Howsare, Hamilton Tiger-Cats
- DE – Isaac Adeyemi-Berglund, Montreal Alouettes
- LB – Tyrice Beverette, Montreal Alouettes
- LB – Darnell Sankey, Montreal Alouettes
- CLB – Adarius Pickett, Ottawa Redblacks
- CB – Jamal Peters, Hamilton Tiger-Cats
- CB – Tarvarus McFadden, Toronto Argonauts
- HB – DaShaun Amos, Hamilton Tiger-Cats
- HB – Wesley Sutton, Montreal Alouettes
- S – Stavros Katsantonis, Hamilton Tiger-Cats

==== Special teams ====
- K – Lirim Hajrullahu, Toronto Argonauts
- P – Joseph Zema, Montreal Alouettes
- ST – Tyrell Richards, Montreal Alouettes

== 2025 CFL awards ==
Award	West Division	East Division	League
George Reed Most Outstanding Player	Nathan Rourke (BC Lions)	Bo Levi Mitchell (Hamilton Tiger-Cats)	Nathan Rourke (BC Lions)
Most Outstanding Canadian	Nathan Rourke (BC Lions)	Isaac Adeyemi-Berglund (Montreal Alouettes)	Nathan Rourke (BC Lions)
Most Outstanding Defensive Player	Mathieu Betts (BC Lions)	Julian Howsare (Hamilton Tiger-Cats)	Mathieu Betts (BC Lions)
Most Outstanding Offensive Lineman	Jermarcus Hardrick (Saskatchewan Roughriders)	Brandon Revenberg (Hamilton Tiger-Cats)	Jermarcus Hardrick (Saskatchewan Roughriders)
Most Outstanding Special Teams Player	Trey Vaval (Winnipeg Blue Bombers)	Lirim Hajrullahu (Toronto Argonauts)	Trey Vaval (Winnipeg Blue Bombers)
Most Outstanding Rookie	Trey Vaval (Winnipeg Blue Bombers)	Devin Veresuk (Hamilton Tiger-Cats)	Trey Vaval (Winnipeg Blue Bombers)
Coach of the Year	Corey Mace (Saskatchewan Roughriders)	Jason Maas (Montreal Alouettes)	Corey Mace (Saskatchewan Roughriders)

- Tom Pate Memorial Award – Andrew Peirson (OL), BC Lions
- Jake Gaudaur Veterans' Trophy – Logan Ferland (OL), Saskatchewan Roughriders
- Commissioner's Award – Wade Miller, President and CEO Winnipeg Blue Bombers
- Hugh Campbell Distinguished Leadership Award –
- Jane Mawby Tribute Award – Carol Barrott, Longtime Winnipeg Manager of Ticketing and Fan Services
