= Andrew Chatfield =

Andrew Chatfield may refer to:

- Andrew G. Chatfield, American lawyer and politician
- Andrew Chatfield (gridiron football)
