= Robert Carter Jr. (gridiron football) =

American football player (born 2003)

Robert Carter Jr
- Carter with the BC Lions in 2026

No. 0 – BC Lions
- Position: Cornerback

Personal information
- Born: February 16, 2003 (age 23); Danville, Virginia, U.S.
- Listed height: 5 ft 10 in (1.78 m)
- Listed weight: 175 lb (79 kg)

Career information
- High school: Dan River (Ringgold, Virginia)
- College: UVA Wise (2021–2022); Robert Morris (2023–2024)
- NFL draft: 2025: undrafted

Career history
- BC Lions (2025); Indianapolis Colts (2026)*; BC Lions (2026–present)
- * Offseason or practice squad member only
- Stats at Pro Football Reference
- Stats at CFL.ca

Robert Carter Jr. (born February 16, 2003) is an American professional football cornerback for the BC Lions of the Canadian Football League (CFL). He played college football for the Virginia-Wise Cavaliers before transferring to the Robert Morris Colonials after two years.

== Early life ==
Carter Jr. was born on February 16, 2003, in Danville, Virginia, and attended Dan River High School in Ringgold, Virginia.

== College career ==
In two years with the UVA Wise Cavaliers, Carter Jr. played 22 games, making 77 tackles, and returning kicks, including a career best 96-yard return against Emory & Henry.

In the 2023 season, Carter Jr. played 10 games for the Robert Morris Colonials, making 22 tackles, including 17 solo tackles. He also returned 12 kickoffs for 293 yards, with his longest return being 44 yards. In 2024, Carter Jr. played 12 games, making 44 tackles, including 28 solo tackles. That year he ran back 10 kickoffs, including a 92-yard return for a touchdown against Central Connecticut. That return led to him being named NEC Player of the Week.

Carter Jr. also made 4 interceptions for the Colonials in 2024, including one off Utah State quarterback Bryson Barnes in which he leapt up and caught the ball with his right hand, bringing it into his body while doing a 360 degree spin in the air before landing on the ground, which drew comparisons to Odell Beckham Jr.

== Professional career ==
Pre-draft measurables
Height	Weight
5 ft 9 1/4 in (1.76 m)	175 lb (79 kg)
Values from Pro Day

=== BC Lions (first stint) ===
Carter Jr. signed with the BC Lions of the Canadian Football League (CFL) on May 7, 2025. On July 27, in a game against the Hamilton Tiger-Cats, Carter Jr. made a one handed interception in the end zone that "could arguably be considered the greatest interception in CFL history," and Sports Illustrated said was “one of the best interceptions you’ll ever see,” comparing Carter Jr. to Odell Beckham Jr. He intercepted a pass in the end zone that was thrown by Hamilton quarterback Bo Levi Mitchell from about the 40-yard line and intended for Brendan O'Leary-Orange. Carter Jr. leaped up and with his left hand caught the ball without making contact with O'Leary-Orange and cradled the ball with his body as he came down and rolled to maintain possession of the ball. Comparing this catch with the one he made while playing for Robert Morris, Carter Jr. said the Robert Morris catch was better, because he had a broken hand at the time.

Carter Jr. played and started in all 18 regular season games where he had 51 defensive tackles, five interceptions (including one returned for a touchdown), 12 pass knockdowns, and one forced fumble. He also served as a kick returner and had six punt returns for 45 yards, seven kickoff returns for 133 yards, and seven missed field goal returns for 133 yards. He played and started in both playoff games where he had six defensive tackles and two kickoff returns for 110 yards and one touchdown.

On January 7, 2026, the Lions released Carter Jr. in order to allow him to pursue an offer in the National Football League (NFL).

=== Indianapolis Colts ===
On January 8, 2026, Carter signed a reserve/future contract with the Indianapolis Colts. Carter was waived by Indianapolis on August 30 as a part of final roster cuts; he was re-signed to the team's practice squad the next day. He was released by Indianapolis on September 15.

=== BC Lions (second stint) ===
On September 22, 2026, it was announced that Carter Jr. had re-signed with the Lions.
