= Kyler Fisher =

American football player (born 2001)

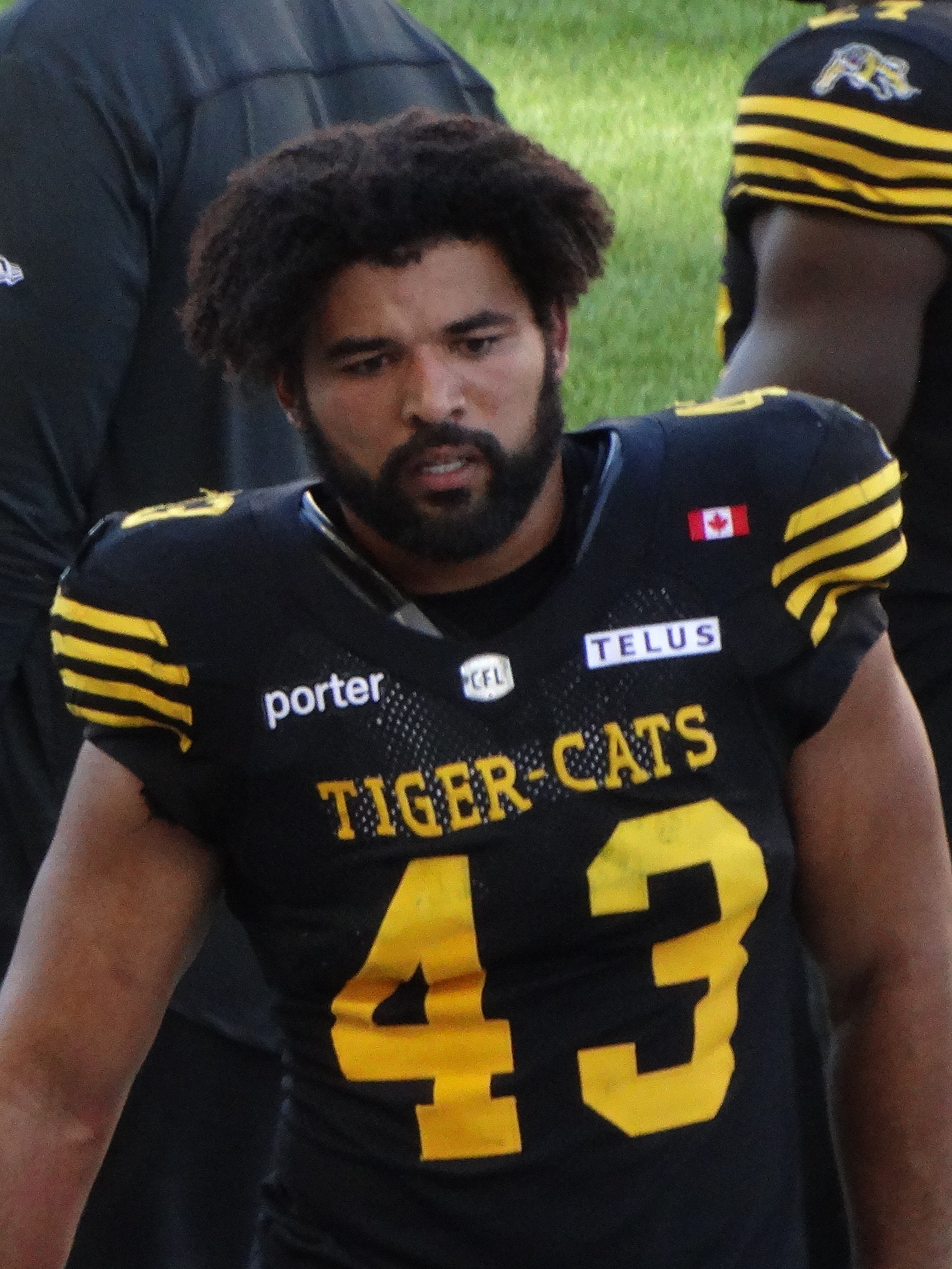
- Fisher with the Hamilton Tiger-Cats in 2025

Profile
- Position: Linebacker

Personal information
- Born: February 16, 2001 (age 25); Farnhamville, Iowa, U.S.
- Listed height: 5 ft 11 in (1.80 m)
- Listed weight: 231 lb (105 kg)

Career information
- High school: Southeast Valley (Gowrie, Iowa)
- College: Iowa (2019–2024)
- NFL draft: 2025: undrafted

Career history
- Hamilton Tiger-Cats (2025)
- Stats at CFL.ca

Kyler Fisher (born February 16, 2001) is an American former professional football linebacker. He played college football at Iowa.

== Early life ==
Kyler Fisher was born on February 16, 2001, in Farnhamville, Iowa. He played high school football at Southeast Valley High School in Gowrie, Iowa. He was a four-year letterman and played running back, linebacker, and defensive back. As a senior, Fisher recorded 264 carries for 2,046 yards and 31 touchdowns, 18 receptions for 195 yards and two touchdowns, 81 tackles, and two fumble recoveries for two touchdowns. For his senior season, he was named first-team all-state as a running back by both the Des Moines Register and the Iowa Newspaper Association. Fisher set school career records in receptions, receiving yards, receiving touchdowns, rushing yards, rushing touchdowns, and tackles. He was also a letterman in wrestling and track. Fisher received offers from some NCAA Division II schools. The University of Iowa was the only Division I school that was interested him.

== College career ==
Fisher joined the Iowa Hawkeyes as a walk-on in 2019. He redshirted the 2019 season, and was a five-year letterman from 2020 to 2024. Fisher played in seven games during the COVID-19 shortened 2020 season and posted two solo tackles. He appeared in all 14 games, including one start at middle linebacker, in 2021, recording three solo tackles and two assisted tackles. He also returned a blocked punt 14 yards for a touchdown, winning the Team Hustle Award for his work on special teams. Fisher played in all 13 games in 2022, posting two solo tackles and three assisted tackles. He appeared in all 14 games, starting three, during the 2023 season, totaling 18 solo tackles, eight assisted tackles, one sack, one forced fumble, and one pass breakup. Fisher played in 11 games, starting three, as a sixth-year senior in 2024, recording 16 solo tackles, ten assisted tackles, one forced fumble, and one pass breakup. He missed the 2024 Music City Bowl due to an "unmet eligibility requirement".

== Professional career ==
After going undrafted in the 2025 NFL draft, Fisher signed with the Hamilton Tiger-Cats of the Canadian Football League on May 16, 2025. He was moved to the practice roster on June 1, and promoted to the active roster on June 26, 2025.

On May 1, 2026, Fisher announced his retirement from professional football.

== Personal life ==
Fisher's sister, Kiersten Fisher, participated in track for the Iowa Hawkeyes.
