= Joe Couch =

Australian gridiron football player (born 1994)

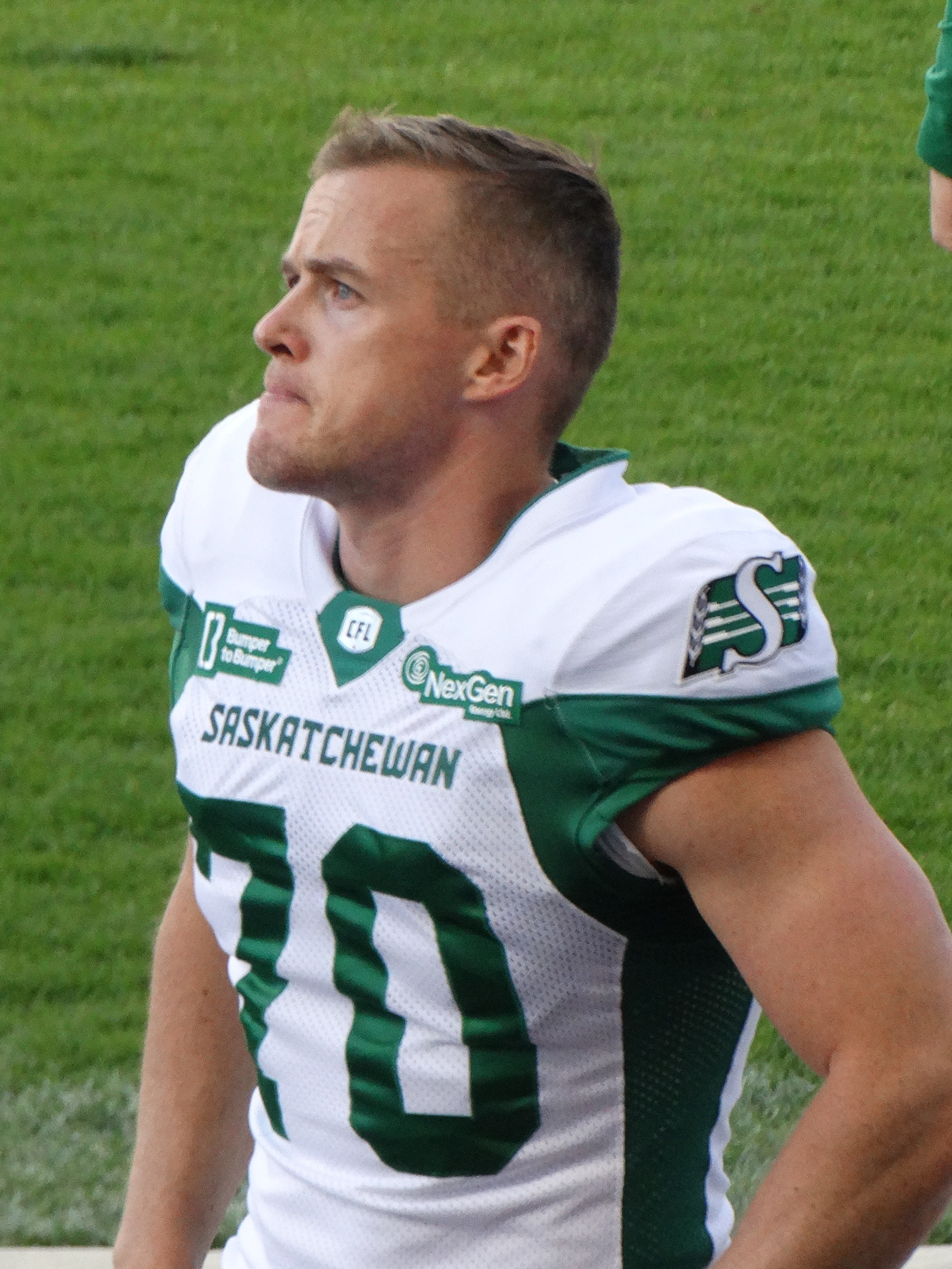
- Couch with the Saskatchewan Roughriders in 2025

Profile
- Position: Punter

Personal information
- Born: 16 October 1994 (age 32); Grovedale, Victoria, Australia
- Listed height: 5 ft 11 in (1.80 m)
- Listed weight: 210 lb (95 kg)

Career information
- High school: Geelong College
- College: Ouachita Baptist
- CFL draft: 2024G: undrafted

Career history
- Saskatchewan Roughriders (2024–2025)

Awards and highlights
- Grey Cup champion (2025)
- Stats at CFL.ca

Joe Couch (born 16 October 1994) is an Australian professional gridiron football punter. He previously played for the Saskatchewan Roughriders of the Canadian Football League (CFL).

== College career ==
Couch attended Prokick Australia, a program designed to train Australian athletes in gridiron football, which led to him playing college football for the Ouachita Baptist Tigers from 2021 to 2023. He played in 29 games where he punted 29 times for a 44.7-yard average with 30 punts landing inside the 20-yard line.

== Professional career ==
On May 6, 2024, it was announced that Couch had signed with the Saskatchewan Roughriders. Following training camp, he accepted a practice roster spot and remained there until the team's 2024 season was finished and his contract expired on November 10, 2024. He re-signed with the team on November 19, 2024.

On May 14, 2025, near the start of training camp in 2025, Couch was released. However, he was re-signed on May 26, 2025, and accepted a practice roster spot during the final cuts on June 1, 2025. When the team's incumbent punter, Adam Korsak retired shortly after, Couch was named the team's opening day punter and played in his first professional game on June 5, 2025, against the Ottawa Redblacks. Couch became a free agent after the 2025 season.

== Personal life ==
Couch was born to parents Geraldine and Paul Couch. His father played in the Australian Football League for Geelong for 13 years.
