= Isaiah Wooden =

American gridiron football player (born 2000)

Isaiah Wooden Sr.
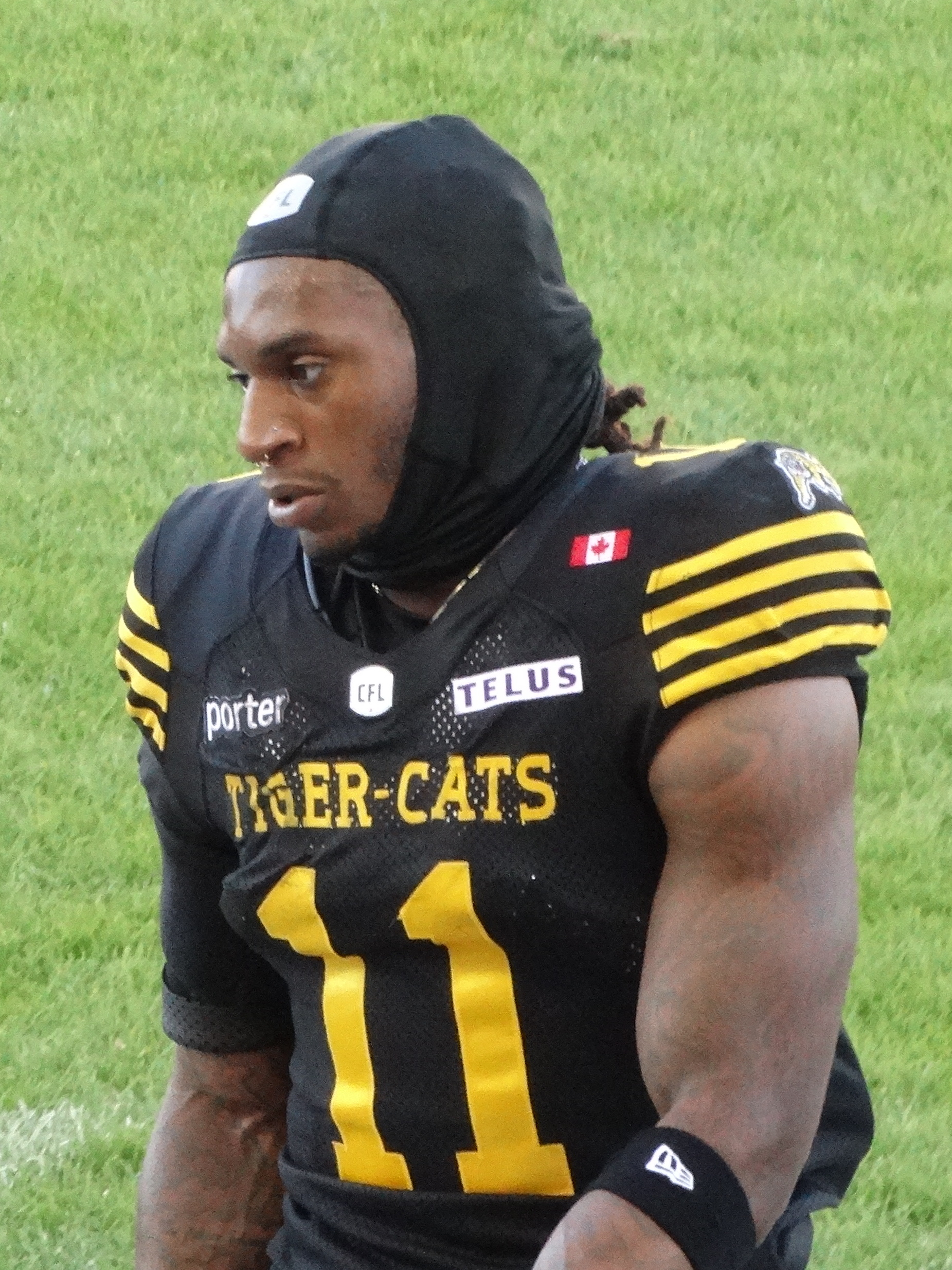
- Wooden with the Hamilton Tiger-Cats in 2025

No. 11 – Hamilton Tiger-Cats
- Position: Wide receiver
- Roster status: Active
- CFL status: American

Personal information
- Born: February 3, 2000 (age 26); San Diego, California, U.S.
- Listed height: 5 ft 9 in (1.75 m)
- Listed weight: 170 lb (77 kg)

Career information
- High school: Helix (La Mesa, California)
- College: Utah Tech (2018); Kent State (2019–2021); Southern Utah (2022–2023)
- NFL draft: 2024: undrafted

Career history
- Atlanta Falcons (2024)*; Los Angeles Chargers (2024)*; BC Lions (2024); Hamilton Tiger-Cats (2024–2025); Cleveland Browns (2026)*; Hamilton Tiger-Cats (2026–present)
- * Offseason or practice squad member only

Awards and highlights
- First-team All-UAC (2023)

Career CFL statistics as of 2026
- Receptions: 5
- Receiving yards: 53
- Kick return yards: 2,538
- Punt return yards: 1,397
- Return touchdowns: 5
- Stats at CFL.ca
- Stats at Pro Football Reference

Isaiah Wooden Sr. (born February 3, 2000) is an American professional football wide receiver for the Hamilton Tiger-Cats of the Canadian Football League (CFL). He played college football for the Utah Tech Trailblazers, Kent State Golden Flashes and the Southern Utah Thunderbirds. He had stints in the National Football League (NFL) with the Atlanta Falcons and Los Angeles Chargers. Wooden also previously played for the BC Lions and Hamilton Tiger-Cats of the Canadian Football League (CFL).

== College career ==
Wooden played for the Utah Tech Trailblazers of Utah Tech University in 2018, Kent State Golden Flashes of Kent State University from 2019 to 2021 and the Southern Utah Thunderbirds of Southern Utah University from 2022 to 2023.

While at Utah Tech, Wooden played in nine games for the Trailblazers recording 61 rushing yards, 1 rushing touchdown, 7 receptions for 177 yards and 2 touchdowns. He also returned a kickoff for a touchdown against the South Dakota Mines Hardrockers.

Wooden transferred to Kent State for the 2019 season, but would sit out the entire year due to NCAA transfer rules. He would see little playing time, appearing in four games in two seasons.

Wooden then transferred to Southern Utah for his final two years of eligibility. In two years as a Thunderbird he logged 124 rushing yards, 1 rushing touchdown, 68 receptions, 1,288 receiving yards and 16 receiving touchdowns. For his efforts in his senior year, he was named to the First-team All-United Athletic Conference team.

== Professional career ==
Pre-draft measurables
Height	Weight	Arm length	Hand span	Wingspan	40-yard dash	10-yard split	20-yard split	20-yard shuttle	Three-cone drill	Vertical jump	Broad jump	Bench press
5 ft 7 in (1.70 m)	176 lb (80 kg)	29 3/8 in (0.75 m)	8 5/8 in (0.22 m)	5 ft 11 1/2 in (1.82 m)	4.38 s	1.38 s	2.45 s	4.52 s	6.90 s	44.5 in (1.13 m)	10 ft 5 in (3.18 m)	13 reps
All values from Pro Day

=== Atlanta Falcons ===
After not being selected in the 2024 NFL draft, Wooden signed with the Atlanta Falcons as an undrafted free agent. On July 30, Wooden was waived by the Falcons.

=== Los Angeles Chargers ===
On August 12, Wooden signed with the Los Angeles Chargers. On August 27, the Chargers released Wooden.

=== BC Lions ===
On September 10, Wooden signed with the BC Lions. He was added to the 1-game injured list on September 12 and was released by the Lions on September 30 without appearing in a game.

=== Hamilton Tiger-Cats ===
On October 1, Wooden was signed to the Hamilton Tiger-Cats practice squad. He would make his Tiger-Cats debut in the final game of the season against the Ottawa Redblacks at kick and punt returner. Wooden returned three kicks for 80 yards with a long of 36 yards and also had one reception for 12 yards. For his performance, he was named to the Honour Roll for Week 21.

=== Cleveland Browns ===
On January 9, 2026, Wooden signed a reserve/futures contract with the Cleveland Browns. He was waived by the Browns on May 19.

=== Hamilton Tiger-Cats (second stint) ===
On May 25, 2026, Wooden signed with the Hamilton Tiger-Cats.
