= Adrian Greene (Canadian football) =

Canadian gridiron football player (born 1999)

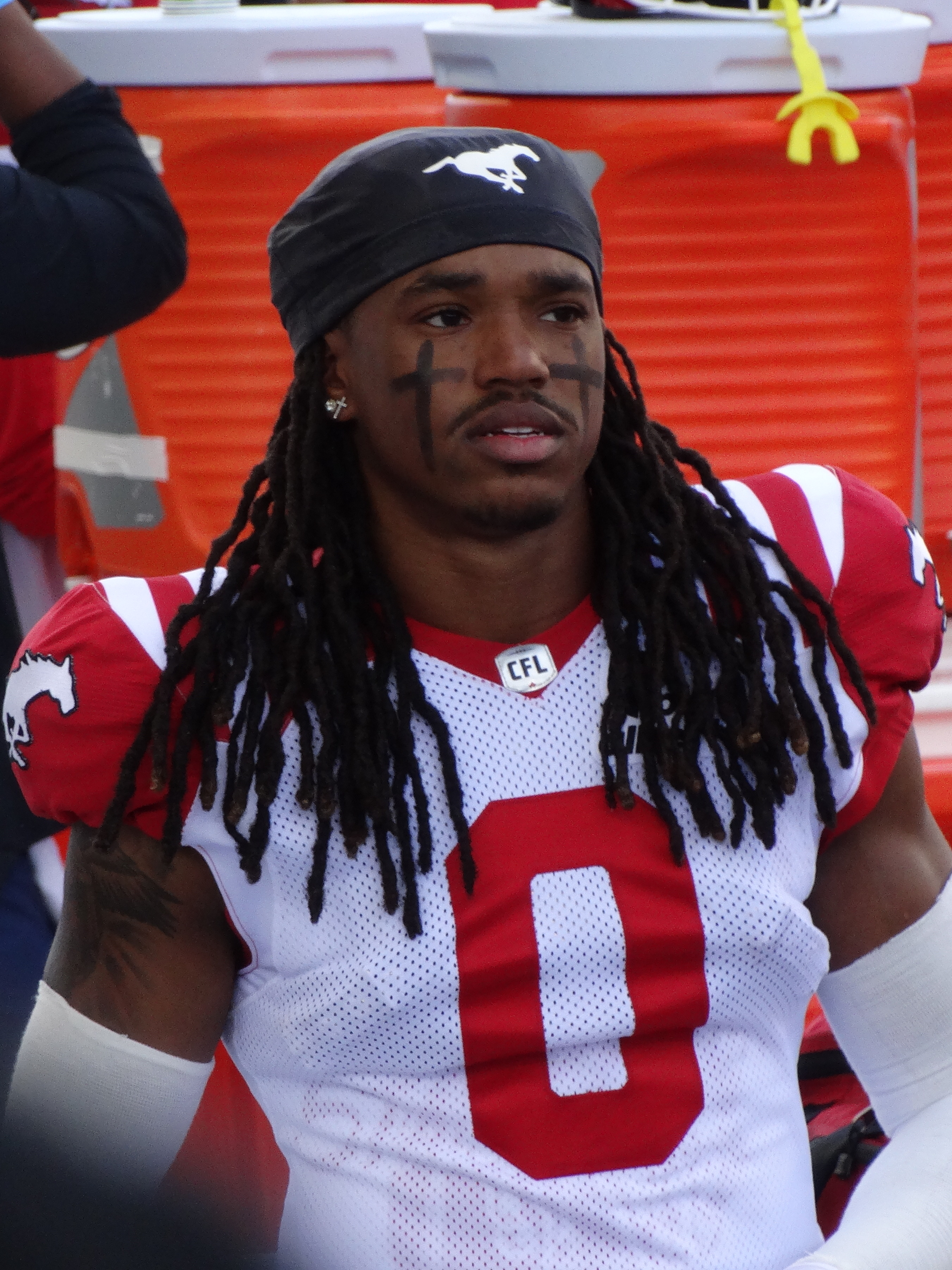
- Greene with the Calgary Stampeders in 2025

No. 0 – Calgary Stampeders
- Position: Defensive back
- Roster status: Active
- CFL status: National

Personal information
- Born: February 15, 1999 (age 27); Toronto, Ontario, Canada
- Listed height: 5 ft 11 in (1.80 m)
- Listed weight: 192 lb (87 kg)

Career information
- University: Saint Mary's
- CFL draft: 2022: 4th round, 32nd overall pick

Career history
- 2022–2024: BC Lions
- 2025–present: Calgary Stampeders

Awards and highlights
- CFL West All-Star (2025)
- Stats at CFL.ca

Adrian Greene (born February 15, 1999) is a Canadian professional football defensive back for the Calgary Stampeders of the Canadian Football League (CFL).

== University career ==
Greene played U Sports football for the Saint Mary's Huskies from 2017 to 2021. He played in 21 games where he had 37 total tackles, one interception, and one fumble recovery.

== Professional career ==
Pre-draft measurables
| Height | Weight | 40-yard dash | 20-yard shuttle | Three-cone drill | Vertical jump | Broad jump | Bench press |
|---|---|---|---|---|---|---|---|
| 5 ft 11 1/8 in (1.81 m) | 194 lb (88 kg) | 4.62 s | 4.24 s | 6.91 s | 35.5 in (0.90 m) | 10 ft 1 3/8 in (3.08 m) | 14 reps |
All values from CFL Combine

=== BC Lions ===
Greene was drafted in the fourth round, 32nd overall, by the BC Lions in the 2022 CFL draft and signed with the team on May 11, 2022. Following training camp in 2022, he began the season on the team's practice roster. He then made his professional debut in week 10, on August 13, 2023, against the Calgary Stampeders. In total, he played in nine regular season games as a back-up defensive back where he recorded three special teams tackles.

In 2023, Greene made the team's opening day active roster and also earned his first start on July 9, 2023, against the Montreal Alouettes. On October 10, 2023, he recorded his first career interception against the Winnipeg Blue Bombers. He played in 17 regular season games, with four starts, where he had 16 defensive tackles, 10 special teams tackles, one interception, and one punt block. In the 2024 season, Greene played in 16 regular season games and had 26 defensive tackles, five special teams tackles, two interceptions, and one forced fumble. He became a free agent upon the expiry of his contract on February 11, 2025.

=== Calgary Stampeders ===
As a free agent from the Lions, Greene signed with Calgary Stampeders on February 11, 2025. On June 14, 2025, he scored his first career touchdown after returning a Nick Arbuckle interception 40 yards for the score.
