= Jacob Roberts (Canadian football) =

American football player (born 2001)

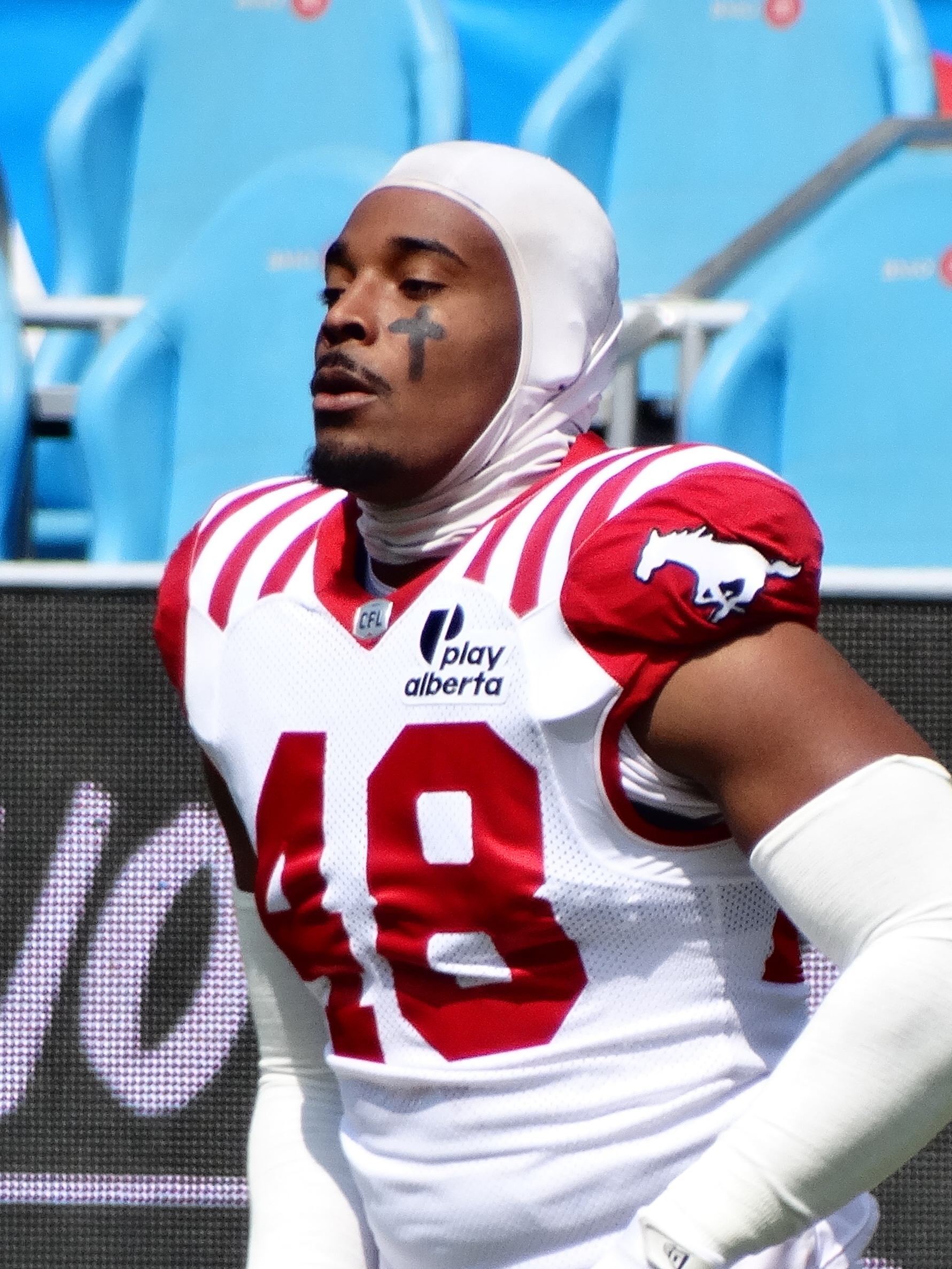
- Roberts with the Calgary Stampeders in 2025

Orlando Storm
- Position: Linebacker
- Roster status: Unsigned draft pick

Personal information
- Born: September 20, 2001 (age 25); Charlotte, North Carolina, U.S.
- Listed height: 6 ft 1 in (1.85 m)
- Listed weight: 233 lb (106 kg)

Career information
- High school: Mallard Creek (Charlotte)
- College: North Carolina A&T (2019–2022); Wake Forest (2023)
- NFL draft: 2024: undrafted

Career history
- Calgary Stampeders (2024–2025); Minnesota Vikings (2026)*; Orlando Storm (2027-present)
- * Offseason or practice squad member only

Awards and highlights
- 2× Second-team All-Big South (2021–2022); Second-team All-MEAC (2019)
- Stats at Pro Football Reference
- Stats at CFL.ca

Jacob Roberts (born September 20, 2001) is an American professional football linebacker. He played college football for the North Carolina A&T Aggies and Wake Forest Demon Deacons.

== Early life ==
Jacob Roberts was born on September 20, 2001. He started playing flag football when he was five. Due to his ability to score touchdowns as a running back, he was moved up to playing against six and seven year olds. From eight years old until seventh grade, Roberts played in the Charlotte Mecklenburg League. He grew up a Wake Forest fan.

Roberts failed to make his school's football team in seventh grade. However, he was able to make the team the following year in eighth grade. As a freshman at Mallard Creek High School in Charlotte, North Carolina, he also failed to make the junior varsity team. However, the next year, Roberts made the team at Mallard Creek as a sophomore tight end. He helped Mallard Creek win the state title his junior year as a linebacker, and was named the Devensive MVP of the state title game. He led the team in tackles and interceptions his senior season, earning first-team all-conference and Charlotte Observer all-area honors. Roberts was invited to the North Carolina-South Carolina Shrine Bowl game.

== College career ==
=== North Carolina A&T ===
Roberts first played college football for the North Carolina A&T Aggies of North Carolina A&T State University from 2019 to 2022. He played in ten games, starting three, for the Aggies during the 2019 season, recording 24 solo tackles, 38 assisted tackles, 4.5 sacks, two interceptions, and one pass breakup. He was named second-team All-Mid-Eastern Athletic Conference and HERO Sports first-team freshman All-American for his performance during the 2019 season. Roberts was also the defensive MVP of the 2019 Celebration Bowl after posting three solo tackles, three assisted tackles, and one interception.

The 2020 was cancelled due to the COVID-19 pandemic. He appeared in 11 games, starting ten, in 2021, totaling 38 solo tackles, 46 assisted tackles, five sacks, one interception, one pass breakup, and an FCS-leading four blocked kicks. His 84 tackles were the most on the team. Roberts garnered second-team All-Big South Conference recognition.

Roberts played in all 11 games in 2022, recording 43 solo tackles, 29 assisted tackles, two interceptions, five pass breakups, one fumble recovery, and two blocked kicks. He earned consensus second-team All-Big South honors, gaining recognition from the conference, coaches, and media. He graduated from North Carolina A&T with a 3.2 grade point average and a degree in sports science.

=== Wake Forest ===
In 2023, Roberts transferred to play for the Wake Forest Demon Deacons of Wake Forest University. He was named the Walter Camp National Defensive Player of the Week after posting 13 tackles (including four for loss), three sacks, and one forced fumble in a 27—24 victory over Old Dominion. He played in all 12 games, starting nine, during the 2023 season, totaling 40 solo tackles, 43 assisted tackles, six sacks, two forced fumbles, and one pass breakup.

== Professional career ==
Pre-draft measurables
Height	Weight	Arm length	Hand span	Wingspan	40-yard dash	10-yard split	20-yard split	20-yard shuttle	Three-cone drill	Vertical jump	Broad jump	Bench press
5 ft 11 5/8 in (1.82 m)	228 lb (103 kg)	30 5/8 in (0.78 m)	9 5/8 in (0.24 m)	6 ft 1 3/4 in (1.87 m)	4.68 s	1.63 s	2.65 s	4.41 s	7.01 s	31.5 in (0.80 m)	9 ft 8 in (2.95 m)	22 reps
All values from Pro Day

=== Calgary Stampeders ===
Roberts went undrafted in the 2024 NFL draft. On August 24, 2024, he was signed to the practice roster of the Calgary Stampeders of the Canadian Football League (CFL). He was promoted to the active roster on September 13. He dressed in six games for Calgary during the 2024 season, posting four defensive tackles, and ten special teams tackles.

=== Minnesota Vikings ===
On January 7, 2026, Roberts signed a reserve/future contract with the Minnesota Vikings. On August 30, he was waived with an injury designation by the Vikings as a part of final roster cuts.
