= Kaylon Horton =

American football player (born 2000)

No. 88
- Position: Wide receiver

Personal information
- Born: June 5, 2000 (age 26); Houston, Texas, U.S.
- Listed height: 5 ft 9 in (1.75 m)
- Listed weight: 173 lb (78 kg)

Career information
- High school: Cypress Ridge (Houston, Texas)
- College: Tarleton State (2018–2021); North Texas (2022–2023)
- NFL draft: 2024: undrafted

Career history
- 2025: Calgary Stampeders

Awards and highlights
- First-team All-CUSA (2022)
- Stats at CFL.ca

Kaylon D’vaughn Horton (born June 5, 2000) is an American professional football wide receiver. Horton played college football for the Tarleton State Texans and the North Texas Mean Green.

== College career ==
Horton played college football for Tarleton State from 2018 to 2021 and North Texas from 2022 to 2023. After redshirting his freshman year, he played in 27 games catching 18 passes for 227 yards and one touchdown. He also played snaps on defense logging 29 tackles, including two for loss, one interception and eight passes defended.

Horton transferred to North Texas for his final two years of eligibility garnering First team All-CUSA honors as a kick returner in 2022. He played in 25 games and caught 18 catches for 175 yards for two touchdowns. Horton also rushed 11 times for 115 yards and two scores.

== Professional career ==
Pre-draft measurables
Height	Weight	Arm length	Hand span	40-yard dash	10-yard split	20-yard split	20-yard shuttle	Three-cone drill	Vertical jump	Broad jump	Bench press
5 ft 9 in (1.75 m)	165 lb (75 kg)	29 1/8 in (0.74 m)	8 5/8 in (0.22 m)	4.50 s	1.58 s	2.49 s	4.15 s	7.03 s	31 in (0.79 m)	9 ft 10 in (3.00 m)	8 reps
All values from Pro Day

After going undrafted in the 2024 NFL Draft, the Calgary Stampeders signed Horton on January 21, 2025. On June 1, he was signed to the practice roster as part of final roster cuts. He played in his first professional game against the Saskatchewan Roughriders on July 12. On July 24, Horton recorded his first catch, for 27 yards, against the Montreal Alouettes. He was released on May 31, 2026.
