= Brandon Barlow =

American gridiron football player (born 1998)

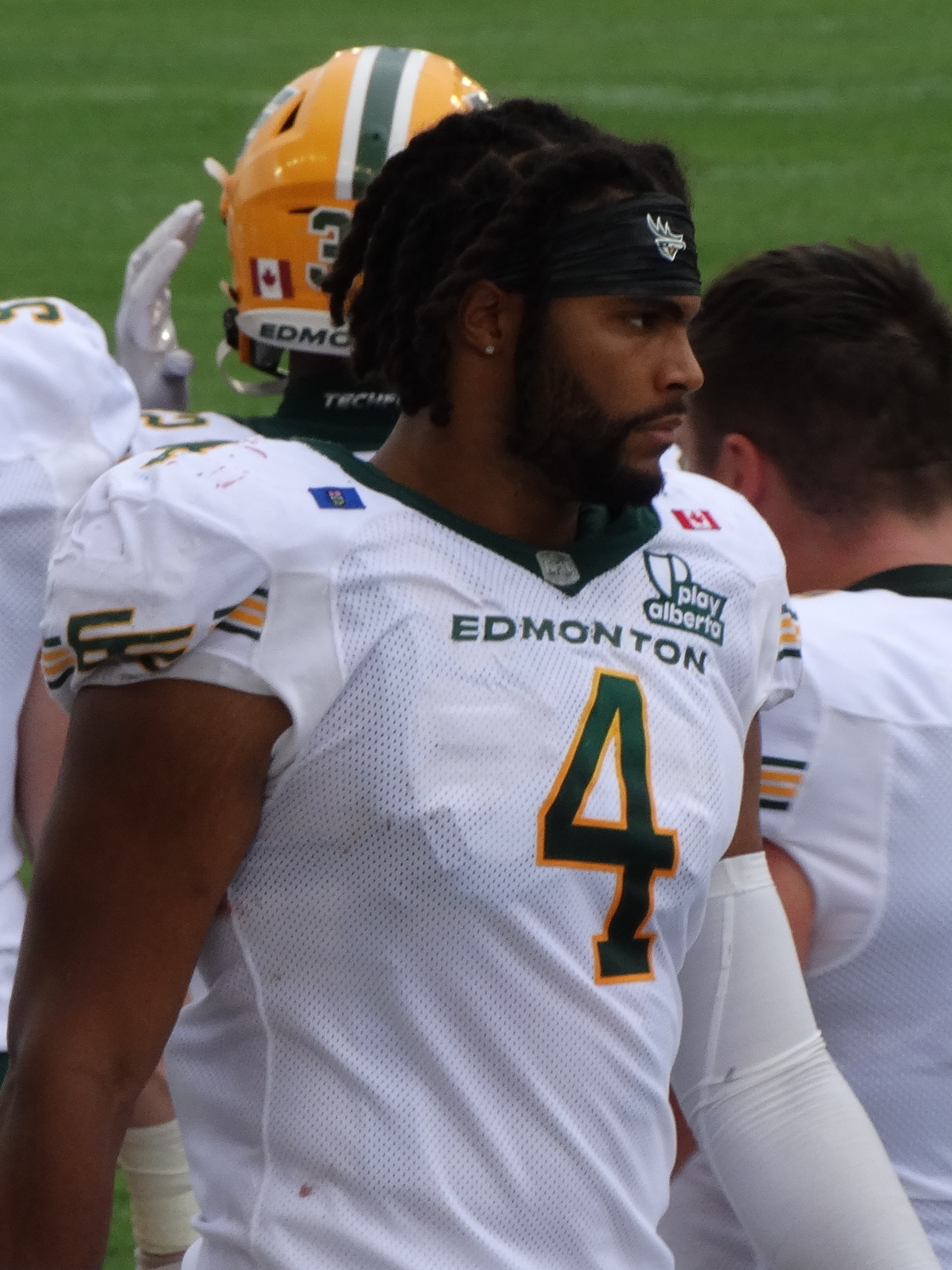
- Barlow with the Edmonton Elks in 2025

No. 4 – Edmonton Elks
- Position: Defensive lineman
- Roster status: 6-game injured list
- CFL status: American

Personal information
- Born: January 25, 1998 (age 28); Cohoes, New York, U.S.
- Listed height: 6 ft 4 in (1.93 m)
- Listed weight: 260 lb (118 kg)

Career information
- High school: Shaker High
- College: Boston College

Career history
- 2022–2023: Toronto Argonauts
- 2024: Hamilton Tiger-Cats
- 2025–present: Edmonton Elks

Awards and highlights
- 2× Grey Cup champion (2022, 2026)
- Stats at CFL.ca

Brandon Barlow (born January 25, 1998) is an American professional football defensive lineman for the Edmonton Elks of the Canadian Football League (CFL).

== College career ==
After using a redshirt season in 2016, Barlow played college football for the Boston College Eagles from 2017 to 2021. He played in 50 games where he had 128 total tackles, 10 sacks, two forced fumbles, and one fumble recovery.

== Professional career ==
Pre-draft measurables
Height	Weight	Arm length	Hand span	Wingspan	40-yard dash	10-yard split	20-yard split	20-yard shuttle	Three-cone drill	Vertical jump	Broad jump	Bench press
6 ft 4 in (1.93 m)	256 lb (116 kg)	33 3/4 in (0.86 m)	9 7/8 in (0.25 m)	6 ft 9 1/8 in (2.06 m)	4.83 s	1.61 s	2.77 s	4.47 s	7.16 s	35.0 in (0.89 m)	9 ft 7 in (2.92 m)	23 reps
All values from Pro Day

=== Toronto Argonauts ===
On August 3, 2022, it was announced that Barlow had signed with the Toronto Argonauts. He soon after made his professional debut on August 12, 2022, against the Hamilton Tiger-Cats. In his next game, on August 26, 2022, also against the Tiger-Cats, he recorded his first sack when he tackled Dane Evans late in the fourth quarter. Barlow made his first start in the last game of the regular season on October 29, 2022, against the Montreal Alouettes where he had three defensive tackles. He played in 10 of the team's last 11 regular season games in 2022 where he had 18 defensive tackles, one special teams tackle, and one sack.

Barlow became a free agent upon the expiry of his contract on February 13, 2024.

=== Hamilton Tiger-Cats ===
On February 14, 2024, it was announced that Barlow had signed with the Hamilton Tiger-Cats. After one season in Hamilton, Barlow was released on February 15, 2025, by the Tiger-Cats.

=== Edmonton Elks ===
Following his release from the Tiger-Cats, Barlow joined the Edmonton Elks on February 18, 2025.

== Personal life ==
Barlow was born to parents Reggie and Wendy Barlow and has one brother, Devon and one sister, Sherri.
