= Jarell Broxton =

American gridiron football player (born 1993)

- Broxton with the Winnipeg Blue Bombers in 2026

No. 55 – Winnipeg Blue Bombers
- Position: Offensive linemen
- Roster status: Active
- CFL status: American

Personal information
- Born: March 27, 1993 (age 33); Olney, Maryland, U.S.
- Listed height: 6 ft 5 in (1.96 m)
- Listed weight: 331 lb (150 kg)

Career information
- High school: Quince Orchard High
- College: Baylor; Lackawanna College

Career history
- 2016–2017: Baltimore Ravens*
- 2019: Baltimore Brigade
- 2020*: Winnipeg Blue Bombers
- 2021–2025: BC Lions
- 2026–present: Winnipeg Blue Bombers
- * Offseason or practice squad member only

Awards and highlights
- CFL's Most Outstanding Offensive Lineman Award (2026); CFL All-Star (2025); 2x CFL West All-Star (2025, 2026)
- Stats at Pro Football Reference
- Stats at CFL.ca

Jarell Martice Broxton (born March 27, 1993) is an American professional football offensive lineman for the Winnipeg Blue Bombers of the Canadian Football League (CFL).

== College career ==
Broxton first played college football for the Lackawanna College Falcons from 2011 to 2013, while using a redshirt season in 2012 due to injury. He then transferred to Baylor University to play for Bears, where he played in 26 games, starting in 21, all at right guard.

== Professional career ==
Pre-draft measurables
Height	Weight	Arm length	Hand span	Wingspan	40-yard dash	10-yard split	20-yard split	20-yard shuttle	Three-cone drill	Vertical jump	Broad jump	Bench press
6 ft 3 7/8 in (1.93 m)	327 lb (148 kg)	33 3/8 in (0.85 m)	10 in (0.25 m)	6 ft 8 in (2.03 m)	5.15 s	1.76 s	2.85 s	4.76 s	7.65 s	30.0 in (0.76 m)	9 ft 6 in (2.90 m)	18 reps
All values from Pro Day

=== Baltimore Ravens ===
After going undrafted in 2015, Broxton signed with the Baltimore Ravens on May 5, 2016. He was waived at the end of pre-season, but signed a practice roster agreement on September 5, 2016. He did not dress for a game in 2016 and signed a futures contract on January 1, 2017. However, he was released on August 31, 2017.

=== Baltimore Brigade ===
Broxton played for the Baltimore Brigade of the Arena Football League in 2019.

=== Winnipeg Blue Bombers (first stint) ===
On February 5, 2020, Broxton signed with the Winnipeg Blue Bombers. However, he did not play in 2020 due to the cancellation of the 2020 CFL season.

=== BC Lions ===
Broxton signed with the BC Lions. He made his CFL debut on August 28, 2021, against the Ottawa Redblacks, but suffered a torn bicep injury which ended his season. After rehabbing the injury, he returned to play in week 19 of the 2022 season, where he played and started in the final three games of the regular season. He also played and started in both of the team's playoff games that year.

In 2023, Broxton became a regular starter where he played and started in 17 regular season games at left tackle. At season's end, he was named the team's nominee for Most Outstanding Offensive Lineman.

On September 18, 2025, Broxton was placed on the Lions' 1-game injured list. He rejoined the active roster on September 25, 2025. On October 3, 2025, Broxton was again placed on the Lions' 1-game injured list. He rejoined the active roster on October 16, 2025.

=== Winnipeg Blue Bombers (second stint) ===
On February 1, 2026, Broxton reportedly signed a two-year contract with the Winnipeg Blue Bombers. On November 4, he won the CFL's Most Outstanding Offensive Lineman Award.

== Personal life ==
Broxton was born to parents Nancy Bice and Anthony Broxton.
