= Evan Holm =

American gridiron football player (born 1996)

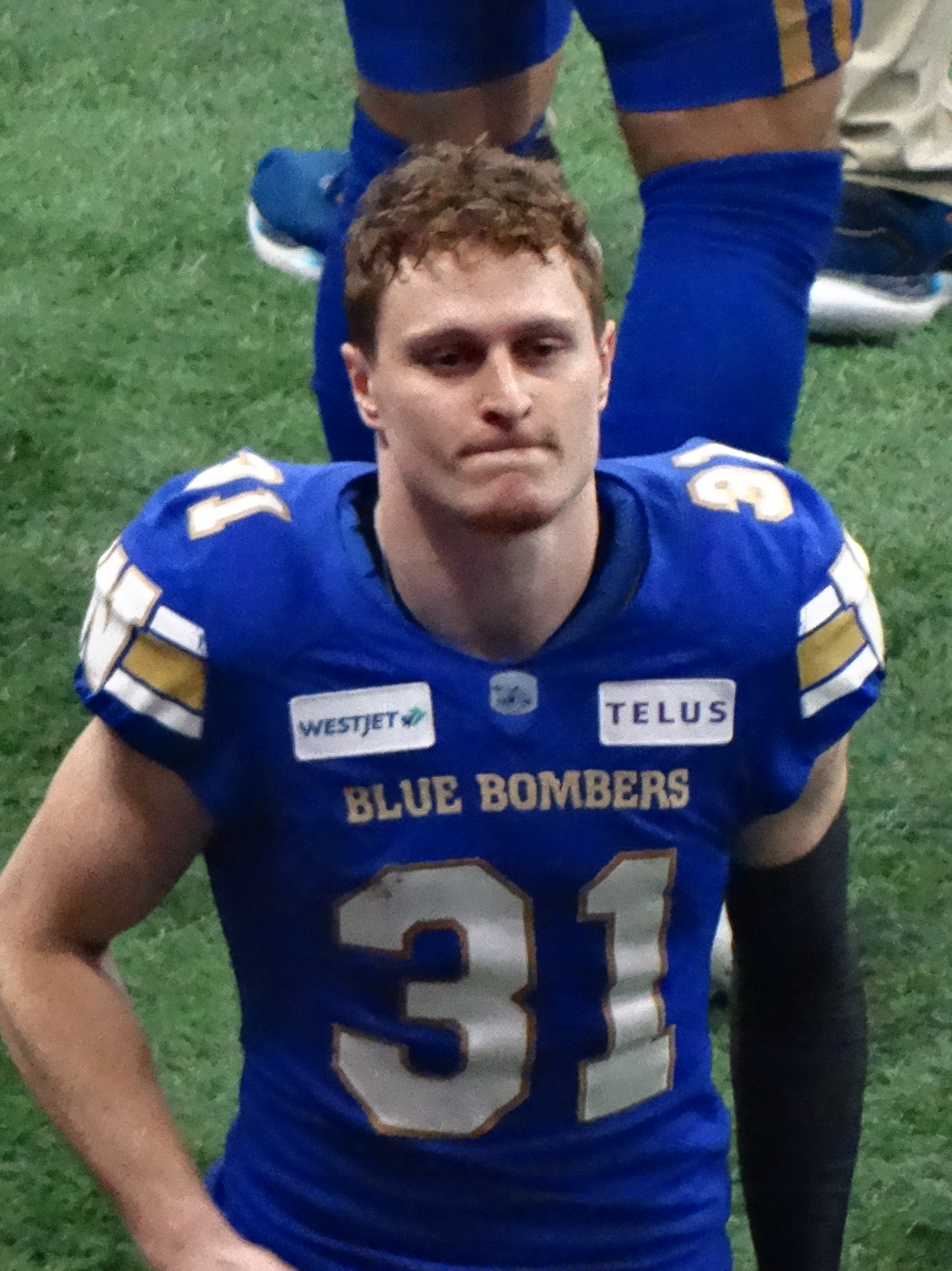
- Holm with the Winnipeg Blue Bombers in 2024

No. 31 – Winnipeg Blue Bombers
- Position: Defensive back
- Roster status: Active
- CFL status: American

Personal information
- Born: April 14, 1998 (age 28); Edina, Minnesota, U.S.
- Listed height: 5 ft 11 in (1.80 m)
- Listed weight: 189 lb (86 kg)

Career information
- High school: Edina High School
- College: North Dakota

Career history
- 2022–present: Winnipeg Blue Bombers

Awards and highlights
- CFL All-Star (2025); 3× CFL West All-Star (2023, 2025, 2026)
- Stats at CFL.ca

Evan Holm (born April 14, 1998) is an American professional football defensive back for the Winnipeg Blue Bombers of the Canadian Football League (CFL).

== College career ==
Holm played college football for the North Dakota Fighting Hawks from 2016 to 2021. He played in 47 games, starting in 25, where he had 103 tackles, six interceptions, 33 pass knockdowns, two fumble recoveries and two forced fumbles.

== Professional career ==
Pre-draft measurables
Height	Weight	Arm length	Hand span	Wingspan	40-yard dash	10-yard split	20-yard split	20-yard shuttle	Three-cone drill	Vertical jump	Broad jump	Bench press
5 ft 11 1/8 in (1.81 m)	181 lb (82 kg)	30 1/8 in (0.77 m)	9 1/4 in (0.23 m)	6 ft 0 7/8 in (1.85 m)	4.45 s	1.57 s	2.61 s	4.15 s	6.64 s	37.0 in (0.94 m)	10 ft 1 in (3.07 m)	13 reps
All values from Pro Day

Holm signed with the Winnipeg Blue Bombers on May 2, 2022. In the 2022 season, he finished the year playing in nine games, starting in four, with 21 defensive tackles, three special teams tackles, and one interception. He also played in both post-season games, including the 109th Grey Cup, where he did not record any statistics in the team's loss to the Toronto Argonauts.

In 2023, Holm played and started in all 18 regular season games where he had 64 defensive tackles, four special teams tackles, 12 pass knockdowns, two interceptions, and two sacks. For his strong season, he was named a West Division All-Star. He played in the 110th Grey Cup where he had seven defensive tackles, one pass knockdown, and one interception in the loss to the Montreal Alouettes.

Holm again played in all 18 regular season games in 2024 where he led the team with 85 defensive tackles and also had four special teams tackles and nine pass knockdowns. He played in his third straight Grey Cup game where he had three defensive tackles, but the Blue Bombers lost to the Argonauts in the 111th Grey Cup. As an impending free agent, he signed a one-year contract extension on January 15, 2025.

== Personal life ==
Holm was born to parents Jon and Bobbi Holm.
