= Cristophe Beaulieu =

Canadian gridiron football player (born 1999)

- Beaulieu with the BC Lions in 2026

No. 29 – BC Lions
- Position: Defensive back
- Roster status: Active
- CFL status: National

Personal information
- Born: December 6, 1999 (age 26); Blainville, Quebec, Canada
- Listed height: 6 ft 2 in (1.88 m)
- Listed weight: 195 lb (88 kg)

Career information
- CEGEP: Saint-Jean-sur-Richelieu
- University: Laval
- CFL draft: 2024: 3rd round, 26th overall pick

Career history
- 2024–present: BC Lions

Awards and highlights
- First-team All-Canadian (2022); Second-team All-Canadian (2023)
- Stats at CFL.ca

Cristophe Beaulieu (born December 6, 1999) is a Canadian professional football defensive back for the BC Lions of the Canadian Football League (CFL).

== University career ==
Beaulieu chose to enroll at Université Laval in 2020, but did not play football that year due to the cancellation of the 2020 U Sports football season. He then played U Sports football for the Laval Rouge et Or from 2021 to 2023. He played in 29 games where he recorded 84.5 tackles, three tackles for losses, 17 pass breakups, and four interceptions. He was named a First-team All-Canadian in 2022 and a Second-team All-Canadian in 2023.

== Professional career ==
Pre-draft measurables
| Height | Weight | 40-yard dash | 20-yard shuttle | Three-cone drill | Vertical jump | Broad jump | Bench press |
|---|---|---|---|---|---|---|---|
| 6 ft 1 7/8 in (1.88 m) | 198 lb (90 kg) | 4.66 s | 4.32 s | 6.84 s | 35.0 in (0.89 m) | 10 ft 5 3/8 in (3.18 m) | 12 reps |
All values from CFL Combine

Beaulieu was drafted in the third round, 26th overall, by the BC Lions in the 2024 CFL draft and signed with the team on May 7, 2024. Following training camp in 2024, he made the team's active roster and played in his first professional game on June 9, 2024, against the Toronto Argonauts where he had one special teams tackle. He later made his first professional start, at safety, on August 2, 2024, against the Winnipeg Blue Bombers, where he recorded three defensive tackles. On September 25, 2025, Beaulieu was placed on the Lions' 6-game injured list, where he spent the remainder of the 2025 CFL season. On May 10, 2026, Beaulieu was placed on the Lions' 6-game injured list during the first day of the team's training camp, prior to the start of the 2026 CFL season. He rejoined the active roster on September 11, 2026. On October 5, Beaulieu signed a one-year contract extension with the Lions, running through the 2027 season.

== Personal life ==
Bealieu's brother, Jordan Beaulieu, also played in the Canadian Football League as a defensive back for four seasons.
