= Mark Vassett =

Australian gridiron football player (born 1996)

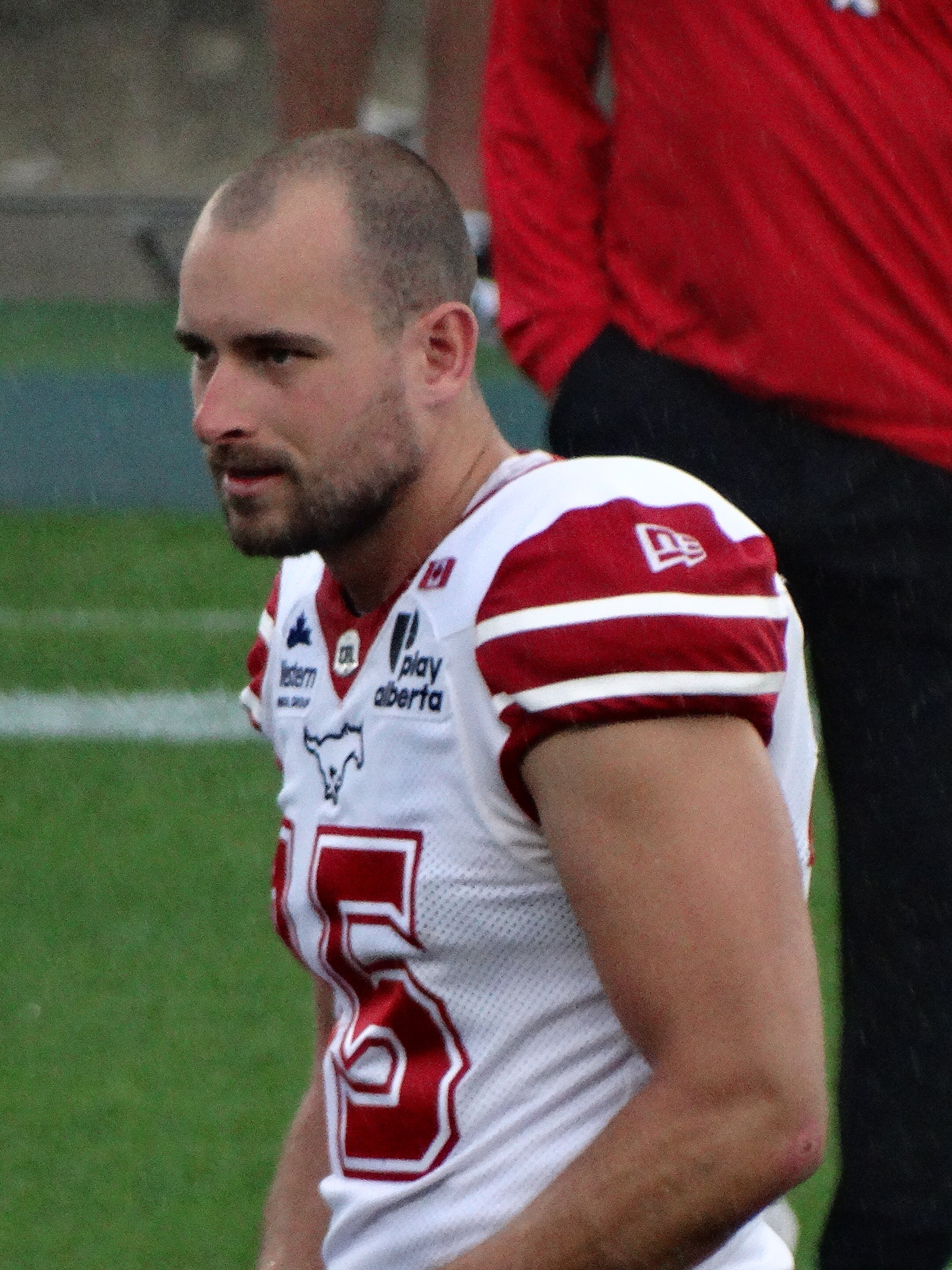
- Vassett with the Calgary Stampeders in 2026

No. 15 – Calgary Stampeders
- Position: Punter
- Roster status: Active
- CFL status: Global

Personal information
- Born: 4 December 1996 (age 29); Dandenong, Melbourne, Australia
- Listed height: 6 ft 4 in (1.93 m)
- Listed weight: 210 lb (95 kg)

Career information
- High school: Warragul Regional College (Warragul, Victoria)
- College: Louisville (2021–2022); Colorado (2023–2024)
- CFL draft: 2025G: 2nd round, 10th overall pick

Career history
- Calgary Stampeders (2025–present)

Awards and highlights
- CFL All-Star (2025); CFL West All-Star (2025)

Career CFL statistics as of 2026
- Punts: 172
- Punting yards: 8,498
- Average punt: 49.4
- Stats at CFL.ca

Mark Vassett Jr. (born 4 December 1996) is an Australian professional Canadian football punter for the Calgary Stampeders of the Canadian Football League (CFL). Vassett played college football for the Louisville Cardinals and the Colorado Buffaloes.

== College career ==
Vassett played college football for Louisville from 2021 to 2022 and Colorado from 2023 to 2024. He played 26 games for the Cardinals and had 100 punts for 4,330 yards, for a 43.3 yard average. After two years at Louisville, Vassett transferred to the University of Colorado. He played in 22 games, punting 107 times for 4,708 yards, averaging 44 yards per kick.

== Professional career ==
Pre-draft measurables
Height	Weight	Arm length	Hand span	Wingspan
6 ft 3 1/4 in (1.91 m)	215 lb (98 kg)	32 1/2 in (0.83 m)	9 3/4 in (0.25 m)	6 ft 5 3/4 in (1.97 m)
All values from Pro Day

After Vassett went undrafted in the 2025 NFL draft, he was selected by the Calgary Stampeders in the 2025 CFL global draft with the 10th pick. He was officially signed by the team on 5 May 2025. Vassett made his CFL debut on 3 July against the Winnipeg Blue Bombers. He punted five times for 265 yards with a long of 68 yards and a net average of 39.8 yards, which garnered praise from his former coach at Colorado, Deion Sanders. In 2025, he played in 13 regular season games where he had 71 punts for a 50.0-yard average. He changed his jersey number from 70 to 15 in the following offseason.
