= Jamal Parker =

American gridiron football player (born 1998)

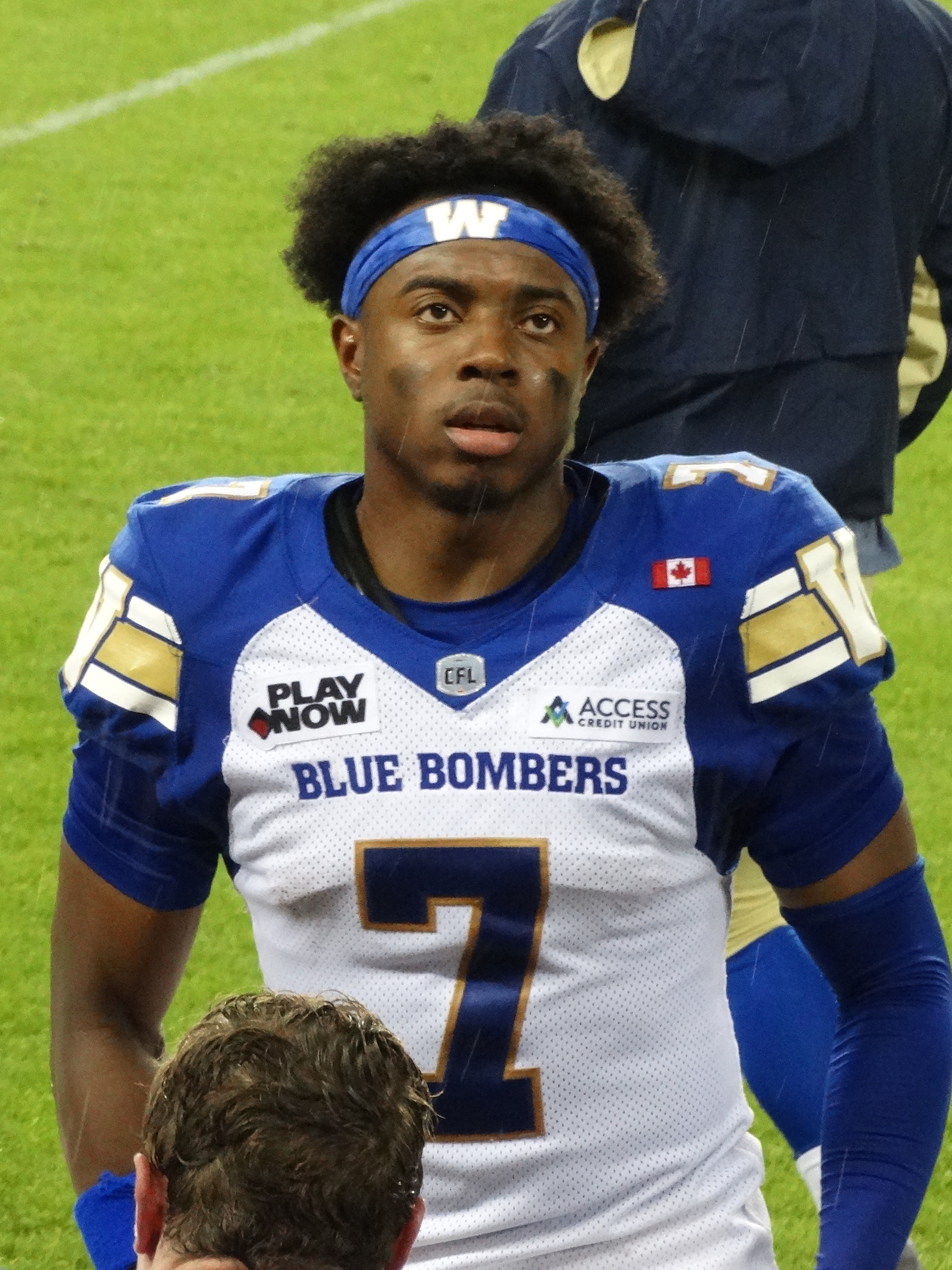
- Parker with the Winnipeg Blue Bombers in 2025

Profile
- Position: Defensive back

Personal information
- Born: January 16, 1998 (age 28); Pennsauken Township, New Jersey, U. S.
- Listed height: 5 ft 9 in (1.75 m)
- Listed weight: 184 lb (83 kg)

Career information
- High school: Camden Catholic
- College: Kent State (2016–2019)

Career history
- 2022–2025: Winnipeg Blue Bombers
- 2026*: BC Lions

Awards and highlights
- Second-team All-MAC (2019)
- Stats at CFL.ca

Jamal Parker Jr. (born January 16, 1998) is an American professional football defensive back who is currently a free agent.

== College career ==
Parker played college football for the Kent State Golden Flashes from 2016 to 2019.

== Professional career ==
=== Winnipeg Blue Bombers ===
On May 15, 2022, it was announced that Parker had signed with the Winnipeg Blue Bombers. He began the 2022 season on the team's practice roster following training camp. However, he was soon promoted to the active roster and played in 13 regular season games, starting in seven, where he had 37 defensive tackles, eight special teams tackles, four pass knockdowns, one interception, and one sack. He also played in both post-season games, including the 109th Grey Cup, where he recorded four defensive tackles in the loss to the Toronto Argonauts.

In 2023, Parker began the season on the six-game injured list. He only dressed in five of the first 15 regular season games as a back up defensive back, but started the last three games of the regular season and the West Final. For the regular season, he had 13 defensive tackles and three special teams tackles.

He was released on December 23, 2025.

=== BC Lions ===
On February 24, 2026, Parker signed a two-year contract with the BC Lions. On April 27, 2026, Parker was released by the Lions.

== Personal life ==
Parker was born to parents Jamal and Donean Parker and has one sister, Jayla.
