= Arthur Hamlin =

Canadian football player (born 1998)

No. 33 – Montreal Alouettes
- Position: Defensive back
- Roster status: Active
- CFL status: National

Personal information
- Born: January 22, 2000 (age 26); Ottawa, Ontario, Canada
- Listed height: 5 ft 11 in (1.80 m)
- Listed weight: 190 lb (86 kg)

Career information
- High school: St. Francis Xavier (Gloucester, Ontario)
- College: Colgate
- CFL draft: 2024: 3rd round, 29th overall pick

Career history
- Montreal Alouettes (2024–present)
- Stats at CFL.ca

Arthur Dean Hamlin (born January 22, 2000) is a Canadian professional football defensive back for the Montreal Alouettes of the Canadian Football League (CFL). He played college football at Colgate.

== Early life ==
Arthur Dean Hamlin was born on January 22, 2000, in Ottawa, Ontario. He played high school football at St. Francis Xavier Catholic High School in Gloucester, Ontario, and was a three-year letterman. He recorded combined junior and senior year totals of 170 tackles, three interceptions, and five kickoff return touchdowns. On offense, he had three receptions for 110 yards and one touchdown, three carries for 20 yards and one touchdown, and one completion on one passing attempt for three yards and one touchdown in only ten offensive snaps. Hamlin also played basketball and volleyball in high school.

== College career ==
Hamlin played college football for the Colgate Raiders of Colgate University. He played in 11 games as a true freshman in 2019, posting nine solo tackles, one assisted tackle, and one fumble recovery. He started both of Colgate's games during the COVID-19 shortened 2020 season, recording four solo tackles and two assisted tackles. Hamlin only played in one game in 2021 due to being diagnosed with Hodgkin lymphoma. He underwent a six-month-long treatment, and was later declared cancer-free in 2022. He returned to the team in 2022, appearing in seven games (six starts) while totaling 14 solo tackles, seven assisted tackles, and one pass breakup. Hamlin played in ten games, all starts, as a senior in 2023, recording 23 solo tackles, nine assisted tackles, one interception, and six pass breakups.

== Professional career ==
Pre-draft measurables
Height	Weight	40-yard dash	20-yard shuttle	Three-cone drill	Vertical jump	Broad jump	Bench press
5 ft 11 in (1.80 m)	186 lb (84 kg)	4.67 s	4.44 s	6.97 s	32.5 in (0.83 m)	9 ft 10 1/2 in (3.01 m)	8 reps
All values from CFL Combine

Hamlin was selected by the Montreal Alouettes in the third round, with the 29th overall pick, of the 2024 CFL draft. He officially signed with the team on May 8, 2024. He was placed on the six-game injured list on June 5, and later activated from injured reserve on July 24, 2024. Hamlin dressed in 12 games overall, starting two, during the 2024 season, recording five defensive tackles, seven special teams tackles, and one interception.

== Personal life ==
Hamlin's brother Nate Hamlin and father Geoff Hamlin played in the CFL. Arthur's grandfather Howard Hamlin won a Grey Cup with the Toronto Balmy Beach Beachers during the 1920s. His uncle Howard Hamlin Jr. was a member of the Ottawa Rough Riders during the 1950s. Another brother, Scott, played football at McGill University.
