= Andrew Chatfield (gridiron football) =

American gridiron football player (born 1998)

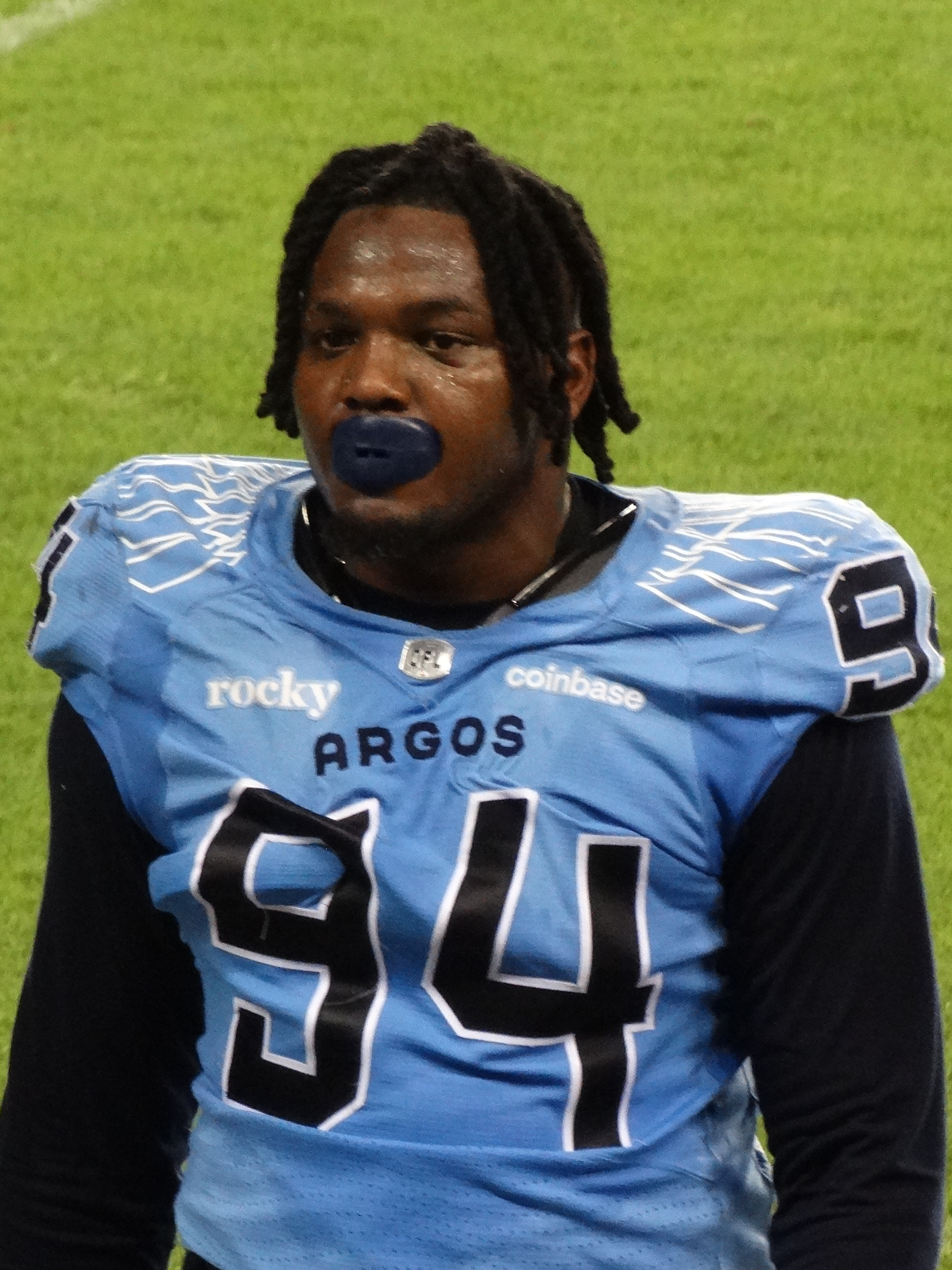
- Chatfield with the Toronto Argonauts in 2025

No. 94 – Toronto Argonauts
- Position: Defensive lineman
- Roster status: Active
- CFL status: American

Personal information
- Born: October 29, 1998 (age 28); Plantation, Florida, U.S.
- Listed height: 6 ft 2 in (1.88 m)
- Listed weight: 250 lb (113 kg)

Career information
- High school: American Heritage High
- College: Florida Gators (2018–2020); Oregon State (2021–2023)

Career history
- 2024: Ottawa Redblacks
- 2025–present: Toronto Argonauts
- Stats at CFL.ca

Andrew Chatfield Jr. (born October 29, 1998) is an American professional football defensive lineman for the Toronto Argonauts of the Canadian Football League (CFL).

== College career ==
Chatfield first played college football for the Florida Gators from 2018 to 2020. He played in 23 games where he recorded 19 tackles, five tackles for a loss, 2.5 sacks, and one pass knockdown. He then transferred to Oregon State University in 2021 to play for the Beavers where he played in 23 games, recording 48 tackles, 12 tackles for a loss, 10.5 sacks, two interceptions, three forced fumbles, and four pass knockdowns.

== Professional career ==
Pre-draft measurables
Height	Weight	Arm length	Hand span	Wingspan	40-yard dash	10-yard split	20-yard split	20-yard shuttle	Three-cone drill	Vertical jump	Broad jump	Bench press
6 ft 1 7/8 in (1.88 m)	250 lb (113 kg)	33 1/4 in (0.84 m)	9 in (0.23 m)	6 ft 8 5/8 in (2.05 m)	4.85 s	1.61 s	2.72 s	4.66 s	7.51 s	33.0 in (0.84 m)	9 ft 11 in (3.02 m)	22 reps
All values from Pro Day

=== Ottawa Redblacks ===
On September 4, 2024, Chatfield signed a practice roster agreement with the Ottawa Redblacks. He dressed in one game in 2024, making his professional debut on September 21, 2024, against the Montreal Alouettes. He was released on October 18, 2024, but signed again with the Redblacks on December 2, 2024.

=== Toronto Argonauts ===
On February 10, 2025, Chatfield was traded to the Toronto Argonauts for Craig James. He made the team's active roster following training camp in 2025 and recorded his first career sack in the team's season opener on June 6, 2025, against the Alouettes.
