= J. J. Ross (Canadian football) =

American gridiron football player (born 2001)

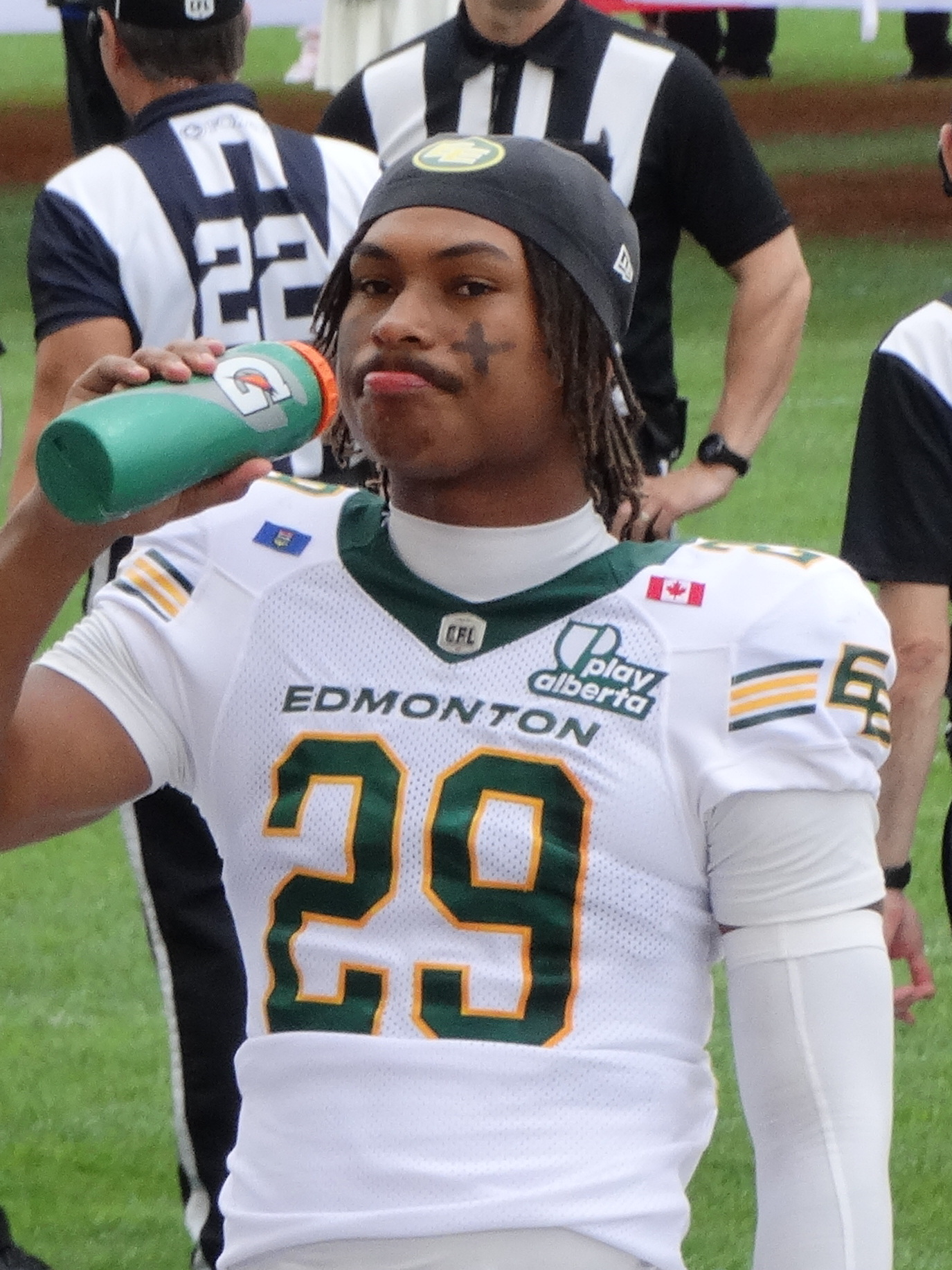
- Ross with the Edmonton Elks in 2025

No. 29 – Edmonton Elks
- Position: Defensive back
- Roster status: Active
- CFL status: American

Personal information
- Born: February 11, 2001 (age 25); Cincinnati, Ohio, U.S.
- Listed height: 6 ft 3 in (1.91 m)
- Listed weight: 195 lb (88 kg)

Career information
- High school: Lakota West (West Chester Township, Ohio)
- College: Eastern Illinois (2019–2020); Western Illinois (2021–2023)
- NFL draft: 2024: undrafted

Career history
- Edmonton Elks (2024–present)

Awards and highlights
- Grey Cup champion (2026); CFL West All-Star (2026)

Career CFL statistics as of 2026
- Games played: 31
- Tackles: 97
- Forced fumbles: 4
- Fumble recoveries: 1
- Pass deflections: 13
- Interceptions: 8
- Stats at CFL.ca

Jeremiah "J. J." Ross (born February 11, 2001) is an American professional football defensive back for the Edmonton Elks of the Canadian Football League (CFL). He played college football for the Eastern Illinois Panthers and the Western Illinois Leathernecks.

== Early life ==
Ross was born on February 11, 2001, in Cincinnati, Ohio. He attended Lakota West High School in West Chester Township, Ohio.

== College career ==
Ross played college football for the Eastern Illinois Panthers from 2019 to 2020 and the Western Illinois Leathernecks from 2021 to 2023. In 18 games at Eastern Illinois, he recorded 42 total tackles, four interceptions, 11 pass deflections and one fumble recovery.

Ross transferred to Western Illinois University in 2021 and played in 30 games, making 113 tackles, including 5.5 for loss, three interceptions, 18 pass breakups, one forced fumble and two fumble recoveries.

== Professional career ==
Pre-draft measurables
Height	Weight	Arm length	Hand span	Wingspan	40-yard dash	10-yard split	20-yard split	20-yard shuttle	Three-cone drill	Vertical jump	Broad jump	Bench press
6 ft 3 in (1.91 m)	200 lb (91 kg)	31 3/8 in (0.80 m)	9 1/2 in (0.24 m)	6 ft 2 1/4 in (1.89 m)	4.68 s	1.59 s	2.69 s	4.50 s	6.98 s	32.5 in (0.83 m)	10 ft 3 in (3.12 m)	10 reps
All values from Pro day

On July 31, 2024, the Edmonton Elks of the Canadian Football League (CFL) signed Ross to the practice roster. He made his CFL debut on August 25, against the Montreal Alouettes. Ross reverted to the practice roster the following week. On October 29, 2024, he signed a future contract with the Elks.

On June 1, 2025, Ross was signed to the practice roster. On July 20, he was promoted to the active roster. He played in 13 games, registering 52 tackles, three interceptions, seven pass deflections and two forced fumbles.

On December 24, 2025, Ross signed a contract extension, keeping him in Edmonton through the 2027 CFL season.
