= Derek Slywka =

American gridiron football player (born 2001)

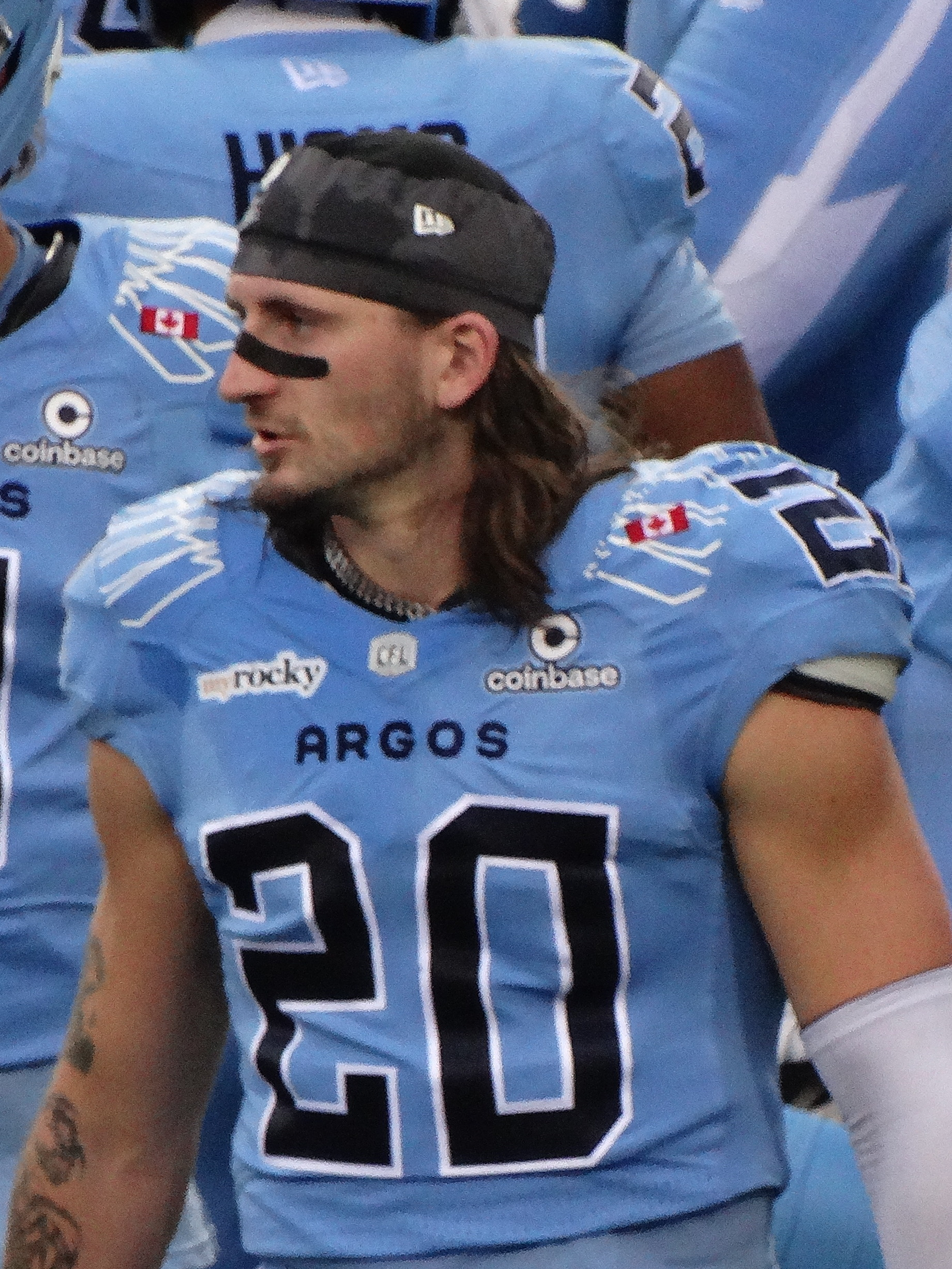
- Slywka with the Toronto Argonauts in 2026

No. 20 – Toronto Argonauts
- Position: Defensive back
- Roster status: Active
- CFL status: American

Personal information
- Born: February 3, 2001 (age 25); Waterloo, New York, U.S.
- Listed height: 6 ft 3 in (1.91 m)
- Listed weight: 215 lb (98 kg)

Career information
- High school: Waterloo High
- College: Finger Lakes Community College (2019–2020); Ithaca (2021–2023)

Career history
- 2024: Indianapolis Colts*
- 2024–present: Toronto Argonauts
- * Offseason or practice squad member only

Awards and highlights
- Grey Cup champion (2024)
- Stats at CFL.ca

Derek Slywka (/ˈslukə/ SLOO-ka; born February 3, 2001) is an American professional football defensive back for the Toronto Argonauts of the Canadian Football League (CFL).

== College career ==
Slywka first played college football for the Finger Lakes Community College Lakers from 2019 to 2020 where he also played on the basketball team. He then transferred to Ithaca College to play for the Ithaca Bombers from 2021 to 2023. He played in 34 games at safety for the Bombers where he recorded 119 tackles, including seven tackles for loss, 11 interceptions, 30 knockdowns, one forced fumble, one fumble recovery, and four blocked kicks.

== Professional career ==
Pre-draft measurables
Height	Weight	Arm length	Hand span	Wingspan	40-yard dash	10-yard split	20-yard split	20-yard shuttle	Three-cone drill	Vertical jump
6 ft 2 3/4 in (1.90 m)	215 lb (98 kg)	31 1/4 in (0.79 m)	9 1/2 in (0.24 m)	6 ft 3 7/8 in (1.93 m)	4.56 s	1.60 s	2.71 s	4.15 s	6.78 s	38.5 in (0.98 m)
All values from Pro Day

=== Indianapolis Colts ===
Slywka signed with the Indianapolis Colts as an undrafted free agent on June 6, 2024, as a wide receiver. However, he was released just before the start of the regular season on August 25, 2024.

=== Toronto Argonauts ===
On September 24, 2024, it was announced that Slywka had signed with the Toronto Argonauts, as a defensive back, to a practice roster agreement. He did not dress in a game in 2024 and was on the practice roster when the Argonauts defeated the Winnipeg Blue Bombers in the 111th Grey Cup game. His contract expired after this game, but he re-signed with the team on November 27, 2024.

In training camp for the 2025 season, Slywka spent time at both receiver and defensive back. After a strong showing, he was named the team's opening day starter at safety and played in his first professional game on June 6, 2025, against the Montreal Alouettes where he recorded three defensive tackles and one interception. On June 29, 2025, in a game against the Ottawa Redblacks, Slywka scored his first career touchdown when he recovered a Kalil Pimpleton fumble and returned it 105 yards for a score. This was the fourth-longest fumble return in CFL history. In the same game, he returned a missed field goal 120 yards for his second career touchdown, helping the Argonauts to a 29–16 win over the Redblacks. He played in 15 regular season games in 2025 where he had 46 defensive tackles, three interceptions, and two forced fumbles.
