= 2026 Calgary Stampeders season =

CFL team season

- General manager: Dave Dickenson
- President: Jay McNeil
- Head coach: Dave Dickenson
- Home stadium: McMahon Stadium

Results
- Record: 9–9
- Division place: 5th, West
- Playoffs: Did not qualify
- Team MOP: Vernon Adams Jr.
- Team MODP: Clarence Hicks
- Team MOC: Jalen Philpot
- Team MOOL: Christy Nkanu
- Team MOST: Tyreik McAllister
- Team MOR: Jesulayomi Ojutalayo

Uniform

The 2026 Calgary Stampeders season was the 68th season for the team in the Canadian Football League (CFL) and their 81st overall. The Calgary Stampeders failed to qualify for the playoffs, or host a home playoff game for the first time since 2019, or win their ninth Grey Cup championship in franchise history. The 2026 CFL season was Dave Dickenson's 10th season as head coach and his fourth season as general manager.

== Offseason ==
=== CFL Canadian draft ===
The 2026 CFL draft took place on April 28, 2026. The Stampeders had seven selections in the eight-round draft after trading their fourth-round pick for Lorenzo Mauldin. Not including traded picks or forfeitures, the team selected sixth in each round of the draft, after finishing third in the 2025 league standings.

Round	Pick	Player	Position	University Team
1	6	Eric Rascoe	LB	Angelo State
3	26	Jesulayomi Ojutalayo	WR	Wilfrid Laurier
3	27	Tristan Marois	DL	Colorado
5	44	Matt Sibley	WR	Calgary
6	53	Mitchell Schechinger	OL	Guelph
7	62	Steven Kpehe	DL	Queen's
8	71	Jack Warrack	OL	Saskatchewan

=== CFL global draft ===
The 2026 CFL global draft took place on April 29, 2026. The Stampeders had two selections in the draft with the sixth pick in each round.

Round	Pick	Player	Position	School	Nationality
1	6	Jude McAtamney	K	Rutgers	Ireland
2	15	Jireh Ojata	DL	Purdue	Nigeria

== Preseason ==
=== Schedule ===
Week	Game	Date	Kickoff	Opponent	Results		TV	Venue	Attendance	Summary
Week	Game	Date	Kickoff	Opponent	Score	Record	TV	Venue	Attendance	Summary
A	1	Mon, May 18	1:00 p.m. MDT	vs. Saskatchewan Roughriders	W 20–15	1–0	CFL+	McMahon Stadium	16,986	Recap
B	Bye									
C	2	Fri, May 29	7:00 p.m. MDT	at Edmonton Elks	W 21–18	2–0	CFL+	Clarke Stadium	3,771	Recap

# Games played with white uniforms from the 2025 season.

== Regular season ==
On November 24, 2025, the Lions announced that they would play their first home game in Kelowna at the Apple Bowl on June 27, 2026, against the Stampeders. The full schedule was released on December 9, 2025.

=== Standings ===
West Division
Team	GP	W	L	Pts	PF	PA	Div	Stk	
Edmonton Elks	18	13	5	26	541	435	7–3	L1	Details
BC Lions	18	10	8	20	516	484	5–5	L2	Details
Saskatchewan Roughriders	18	10	8	20	486	473	5–5	W2	Details
Winnipeg Blue Bombers	18	9	9	18	475	492	4–6	W1	Details
Calgary Stampeders	18	9	9	18	632	587	4–6	W1	Details

=== Schedule ===
Week	Game	Date	Kickoff	Opponent	Results		TV	Venue	Attendance	Summary
Week	Game	Date	Kickoff	Opponent	Score	Record	TV	Venue	Attendance	Summary
1	1	Fri, June 5	7:00 p.m. MDT	vs. Winnipeg Blue Bombers	L 28–30	0–1	TSN	McMahon Stadium	17,743	Recap
2	Bye									
3	2	Sat, June 20	5:00 p.m. MDT	vs. Saskatchewan Roughriders	L 37–40 (OT)	0–2	TSN	McMahon Stadium	21,262	Recap
4	3	Sat, June 27	5:00 p.m. MDT	at BC Lions	W 41–33	1–2	TSN	Apple Bowl	19,108	Recap
5	4	Thu, July 2	7:00 p.m. MDT	vs. Toronto Argonauts	W 58–36	2–2	TSN	McMahon Stadium	19,100	Recap
6	5	Sat, July 11	5:00 p.m. MDT	at Montreal Alouettes	L 30–37	2–3	TSN/RDS	Molson Stadium	18,046	Recap
7	6	Sat, July 18	2:00 p.m. MDT	vs. Montreal Alouettes	L 32–38	2–4	TSN/RDS	McMahon Stadium	19,228	Recap
8	7	Fri, July 24	6:30 p.m. MDT	at Winnipeg Blue Bombers	W 52–30	3–4	TSN	Princess Auto Stadium	32,343	Recap
9	8	Sat, Aug 1	1:00 p.m. MDT	at Hamilton Tiger-Cats	W 44–20	4–4	TSN	Hamilton Stadium	20,026	Recap
10	9	Thu, Aug 6	5:30 p.m. MDT	at Toronto Argonauts	L 30–33	4–5	TSN	BMO Field	16,160	Recap
11	10	Thu, Aug 13	7:00 p.m. MDT	vs. BC Lions	L 26–30	4–6	TSN	McMahon Stadium	17,076	Recap
12	Bye									
13	11	Sat, Aug 29	1:00 p.m. MDT	vs. Hamilton Tiger-Cats	W 28–23	5–6	TSN	McMahon Stadium	19,855	Recap
14	12	Mon, Sept 7	4:00 p.m. MDT	vs. Edmonton Elks	L 28–38	5–7	TSN	McMahon Stadium	25,698	Recap
15	13	Sat, Sept 12	5:00 p.m. MDT	at Edmonton Elks	L 16–53	5–8	TSN	Commonwealth Stadium	31,531	Recap
16	14	Sat, Sep 19	5:00 p.m. MDT	vs. Ottawa Redblacks	W 40–38	6–8	TSN	McMahon Stadium	20,113	Recap
17	15	Sat, Sept 26	1:00 p.m. MDT	at Ottawa Redblacks	W 45–31	7–8	TSN	TD Place Stadium	15,480	Recap
18	16	Fri, Oct 2	7:30 p.m. MDT	at Saskatchewan Roughriders	W 37–31	8–8	TSN	Mosaic Stadium	29,412	Recap
19	17	Sat, Oct 10	5:00 p.m. MDT	at Winnipeg Blue Bombers	L 28–33	8–9	TSN	Princess Auto Stadium	32,343	Recap
20	18	Sat, Oct 17	5:00 p.m. MDT	vs. BC Lions	W 32–13	9–9	TSN	McMahon Stadium	21,968	Recap
21	Bye									

# Games played with red uniforms.
# Games played with white uniforms.
# Games played with black uniforms.

== Team ==
=== Roster ===
Calgary Stampeders roster
**Quarterbacks**: 3 Vernon Adams; 12 Josh Love; 19 Quincy Vaughn; **Receivers**: 89 Ajou Ajou; 14 Clark Barnes; 87 Erik Brooks; 4 Tevin Jones; 82 Jesulayomi Ojutalayo; 85 Jalen Philpot; **Running backs**: 28 Ludovick Choquette; 34 Tyreik McAllister; 20 Deonta McMahon	**Offensive linemen**: 61 William Barnes; 66 Bryce Bell; 60 D'Antne Demery; 57 Chris Fortin; 52 Preston Nichols; 65 Christy Nkanu; 59 Matthew Stokman; **Defensive linemen**: 90 Miles Brown; 1 Clarence Hicks; 96 Jaylon Hutchings; 47 George Idoko; 91 Collin Kornelson; 7 Folarin Orimolade; 77 Kelon Thomas; 93 Charles Wiley	**Linebackers**: 51 Kelechi Anyalebechi; 36 Terrence Ganyi; 8 Marquel Lee; 42 Micah Teitz; **Defensive backs**: 33 Zy Alexander; 45 Lance Boykin; 21 Bailey Devine-Scott; 25 Jaydon Grant; 31 Anton Haie; 44 Anthony Johnson; 24 Ashton Miller-Melancon; 6 Derrick Moncrief; 27 Godfrey Onyeka; 23 Jacob Taylor; 9 Damon Webb; **Special teams**: 43 Jason MacGougan LS; 30 René Paredes K; 15 Mark Vassett P	**Reserve**: 99 Daniel Joseph DL; 16 Ben Wooldridge QB; **1-game injured**: 80 Damien Alford WR; 63 Brad Ashmore OL; 84 Reggie Begelton WR; 0 Adrian Greene DB; 48 R. J. Moten LB; 41 Eric Rascoe LB; 67 Zack Williams OL; **6-game injured**: 38 Sheldon Arnold DB; 17 Dejon Brissett WR; 29 Ben Labrosse DB; 26 Dedrick Mills RB; 97 Justin Sambu DL; 2 Kyle Wilson LB	**Practice roster**: 81 Shawn Bane Jr. WR; 54 Bakyne Coly OL; 92 Savio Frazier DL; 58 Daniel Grzesiak DL; 94 Elijah Hills DL; 83 Jeremiah Hunter WR; 35 BoPete Keyes DB; 50 Khairi Manns DL; 98 Tristan Marois DL; 37 Jude McAtamney K; 64 Tyler Packer OL; 40 Jackson Sombach DB; 32 Tre Stewart RB; **Suspended**: 32 Ike Larsen DB
Italics indicate American player • **Bold** indicates Global player • 45 Active, 2 Reserve, 13 Injured, 13 Practice, 1 Suspended; Roster updated 2026-10-17 • Depth chart • Transactions • More CFL rosters

=== Coaching staff ===
Calgary Stampeders staff
**Front office**: President – Jay McNeil; General manager – Dave Dickenson; Director of Player Personnel – Brendan Mahoney; Director of U.S. Scouting – Cole Hufnagel; Football Administration Director – Molly Campbell; Director of Football Operations – Nick Bojda; CFL Draft Coordinator – Dwayne Cameron; **Head coach**: Head coach – Dave Dickenson; **Offensive coaches**: Offensive Coordinator and Running Backs – Pat DelMonaco; Quarterbacks – Jarious Jackson; Receivers – Markus Howell; Offensive Line – Ucambre Williams; Offensive and Special Teams Assistant – Colton Hunchak	**Defensive coaches**: Defensive Coordinator – Bob Slowik; Linebackers and Run Game Coordinator – Marcus Klund; Defensive Line – John Bowman; Defensive Backs – Barron Miles; **Special teams coaches**: Special Teams Coordinator – Craig Dickenson; **Strength and conditioning**: Strength and Conditioning – Daryl Chambers; → Coaching Staff → More CFL staffs
