= 2023 Winnipeg Blue Bombers season =

CFL team season

- General manager: Kyle Walters
- President: Wade Miller
- Head coach: Mike O'Shea
- Home stadium: IG Field

Results
- Record: 14–4
- Division place: 1st, West
- Playoffs: Lost Grey Cup
- Team MOP: Brady Oliveira
- Team MODP: Willie Jefferson
- Team MOC: Brady Oliveira
- Team MOOL: Jermarcus Hardrick
- Team MOST: Sergio Castillo
- Team MOR: Jamieson Sheahan

Uniform
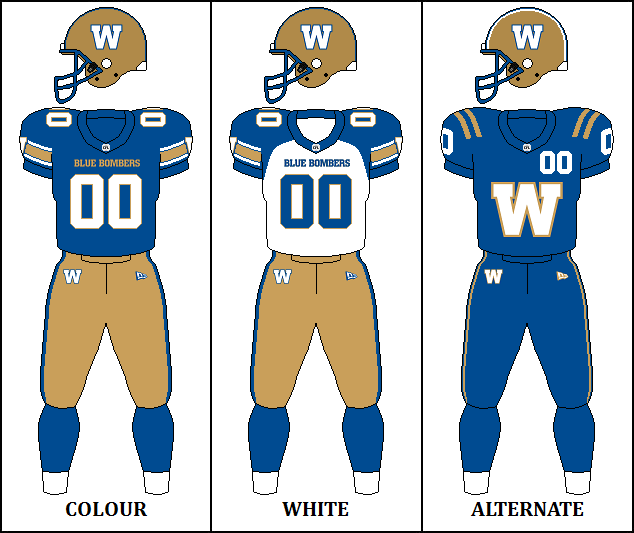

The 2023 Winnipeg Blue Bombers season was the 65th season for the team in the Canadian Football League (CFL) and their 90th season overall. The Blue Bombers qualified for the playoffs for the sixth consecutive season and played in their fourth straight Grey Cup game. However, the team lost the 110th Grey Cup to the Montreal Alouettes.

The 2023 CFL season was the ninth season under head coach Mike O'Shea and the ninth full season under general manager Kyle Walters.

== Offseason ==
=== CFL global draft ===
The 2023 CFL global draft took place on May 2, 2023. The Blue Bombers had the eighth selection in each round.

Round	Pick	Player	Position	Club/School	Nationality
1	8	Jamieson Sheahan	P	California	Australia
2	17	Karl Schmitz	P	Jacksonville	Bermuda

== CFL national draft ==
The 2023 CFL draft took place on May 2, 2023. The Blue Bombers had eight selections in the eight-round draft and owned all of their own selections by virtue of not trading any picks. The team had the eighth selection in each of the eight rounds of the draft (not including forfeited picks by other teams) after losing the 109th Grey Cup.

Round	Pick	Player	Position	University team	Hometown
1	8	Anthony Bennett	DL	Regina	Weston, FL
2	15	Jake Kelly	DB	Bishop's	Markham, ON
3	26	Jeremy Murphy	WR	Concordia (QC)	Montreal, QC
4	35	Tanner Schmekel	DL	Regina	Regina, SK
5	44	Collin Kornelson	DL	Manitoba	Winnipeg, MB
6	53	Breton MacDougall	DB	Windsor	LaSalle, ON
7	62	Jonathan Rosery	RB	Alberta	Edmonton, AB
8	71	Max Charbonneau	LB	Ottawa	Ottawa, ON

== Preseason ==
=== Schedule ===
Week	Game	Date	Kickoff	Opponent	Results		TV	Venue	Attendance	Summary
Week	Game	Date	Kickoff	Opponent	Score	Record	TV	Venue	Attendance	Summary
A	Bye									
B	1	Sat, May 27	3:00 p.m. CDT	at Edmonton Elks	W 25–23	1–0	None	Commonwealth Stadium	N/A	Recap
C	2	Fri, Jun 2	7:30 p.m. CDT	vs. Saskatchewan Roughriders	L 16–28	1–1	TSN	IG Field	24,654	Recap

== Regular season ==
=== Standings ===
West Division
Team	GP	W	L	T	Pts	PF	PA	Div	Stk	
Winnipeg Blue Bombers	18	14	4	0	28	594	377	10–2	W4	Details
BC Lions	18	12	6	0	24	495	439	8–4	L1	Details
Calgary Stampeders	18	6	12	0	12	412	471	4–7	L1	Details
Saskatchewan Roughriders	18	6	12	0	12	387	551	5–7	L7	Details
Edmonton Elks	18	4	14	0	8	367	517	2–9	L4	Details

=== Schedule ===
Week	Game	Date	Kickoff	Opponent	Results		TV	Venue	Attendance	Summary
Week	Game	Date	Kickoff	Opponent	Score	Record	TV	Venue	Attendance	Summary
1	1	Fri, June 9	7:30 p.m. CDT	vs. Hamilton Tiger-Cats	W 42–31	1–0	TSN	IG Field	29,057	Recap
2	2	Fri, June 16	8:00 p.m. CDT	at Saskatchewan Roughriders	W 45–27	2–0	TSN/CBSSN	Mosaic Stadium	28,299	Recap
3	3	Thu, June 22	7:30 p.m. CDT	vs. BC Lions	L 6–30	2–1	TSN	IG Field	25,662	Recap
4	4	Sat, July 1	6:00 p.m. CDT	at Montreal Alouettes	W 17–3	3–1	TSN/RDS/CBSSN	Molson Stadium	15,088	Recap
5	5	Fri, July 7	7:30 p.m. CDT	vs. Calgary Stampeders	W 24–11	4–1	TSN/RDS	IG Field	30,561	Recap
6	6	Sat, July 15	3:00 p.m. CDT	at Ottawa Redblacks	L 28–31 (OT)	4–2	TSN/RDS	TD Place Stadium	18,144	Recap
7	7	Thu, July 20	7:30 p.m. CDT	vs. Edmonton Elks	W 28–14	5–2	TSN	IG Field	28,512	Recap
8	Bye									
9	8	Thu, Aug 3	7:30 p.m. CDT	vs. BC Lions	W 50–14	6–2	TSN/RDS/CBSSN	IG Field	30,874	Recap
10	9	Thu, Aug 10	8:00 p.m. CDT	at Edmonton Elks	W 38–29	7–2	TSN/CBSSN	Commonwealth Stadium	19,921	Recap
11	10	Fri, Aug 18	8:00 p.m. CDT	at Calgary Stampeders	W 19–18	8–2	TSN/RDS2	McMahon Stadium	20,106	Recap
12	11	Thu, Aug 24	7:30 p.m. CDT	vs. Montreal Alouettes	W 47–17	9–2	TSN/RDS/CBSSN	IG Field	32,343	Recap
13	12	Sun, Sept 3	6:00 p.m. CDT	at Saskatchewan Roughriders	L 30–32 (OT)	9–3	TSN/CBSSN	Mosaic Stadium	33,350	Recap
14	13	Sat, Sept 9	3:00 p.m. CDT	vs. Saskatchewan Roughriders	W 51–6	10–3	TSN	IG Field	32,343	Recap
15	14	Sat, Sept 16	3:00 p.m. CDT	at Hamilton Tiger-Cats	L 23–29	10–4	TSN	Tim Hortons Field	22,610	Recap
16	Bye									
17	15	Fri, Sept 29	7:00 p.m. CDT	vs. Toronto Argonauts	W 31–21	11–4	TSN/RDS	IG Field	32,343	Recap
18	16	Fri, Oct 6	9:00 p.m. CDT	at BC Lions	W 34–26 (OT)	12–4	TSN	BC Place	23,512	Recap
19	Bye									
20	17	Sat, Oct 21	6:00 p.m. CDT	vs. Edmonton Elks	W 45–25	13–4	TSN	IG Field	32,343	Recap
21	18	Fri, Oct 27	8:00 p.m. CDT	at Calgary Stampeders	W 36–13	14–4	TSN	McMahon Stadium	18,691	Recap

== Post-season ==
=== Schedule ===
Game	Date	Kickoff	Opponent	Results		TV	Venue	Attendance	Summary
Game	Date	Kickoff	Opponent	Score	Record	TV	Venue	Attendance	Summary
West Semi-Final	Sat, Nov 4	Bye							
West Final	Sat, Nov 11	5:30 p.m. CST	vs BC Lions	W 24–13	1–0	TSN/RDS	IG Field	32,343	Recap
110th Grey Cup	Sun, Nov 19	5:00 p.m. CST	Montreal Alouettes	L 24–28	1–1	TSN/RDS	Tim Hortons Field	28,808	Recap

== Roster ==
2023 Winnipeg Blue Bombers final roster
**Quarterbacks**: 6 Dru Brown; 8 Zach Collaros; 12 Dakota Prukop; **Running backs**: 27 Johnny Augustine; 48 Damian Jackson; 20 Brady Oliveira; **Receivers**: 88 Rasheed Bailey; 10 Nic Demski; 80 Janarion Grant; 89 Kenny Lawler; 84 Brendan O'Leary-Orange; 83 Dalton Schoen; 82 Drew Wolitarsky	**Offensive linemen**: 66 Stanley Bryant T; 61 Liam Dobson G/C; 65 Asotui Eli G/C; 68 Geoff Gray G; 51 Jermarcus Hardrick T; 67 Chris Kolankowski C; 53 Patrick Neufeld G; **Defensive linemen**: 90 Anthony Bennett DE; 3 Thiadric Hansen DE; 94 Jackson Jeffcoat DE; 5 Willie Jefferson DE; 99 Cameron Lawson DT; 95 Jake Thomas DT; 9 Ricky Walker DT	**Linebackers**: 4 Adam Bighill; 34 Jesse Briggs; 47 Tanner Cadwallader; 33 Malik Clements; 41 Brian Cole II; 44 Shayne Gauthier; 19 Kyrie Wilson; **Defensive backs**: 37 Brandon Alexander; 39 Kerfalla Exumé; 21 Nick Hallett; 31 Evan Holm; 35 Demerio Houston; 17 Redha Kramdi; 1 Deatrick Nichols; 7 Jamal Parker	**Special teams**: 40 Mike Benson LS; 14 Sergio Castillo K; 18 Jamieson Sheahan P; **Practice roster**: 13 Markeith Ambles WR; 15 Ronnie Blackmon WR; 23 Noah Hallett DB; 22 Des Lawrence DB; 69 Tomoya Machino G; 00 Les Maruo LB; **Suspended list**: Will Allen DB; O'Bryan Goodson DT	**Injured list**: 81 Ravi Alston SB; 43 Jared Beeksma LB; 2 Alden Darby DB; 90 Miles Fox DT; 49 TyJuan Garbutt DE; 45 Celestin Haba DE; 42 Souleymane Karamoko DB; 16 Jake Kelly DB; 29 Greg McCrae SB; 38 Tyrique McGhee DB; 24 Mike Miller FB; 87 Jeremy Murphy WR; 60 Drew Richmond T; 30 Winston Rose DB; 96 Tanner Schmekel DT
Italics indicate American player • **Bold** indicates Global player

== Coaching staff ==
Winnipeg Blue Bombers staff
Front office: Owner – Winnipeg Football Club; Chairperson of the Board of Governors – Dayna Spiring; President/CEO – Wade Miller; General Manager of Football Operations – Kyle Walters; Senior Assistant General Manager / Director of Player Personnel – Ted Goveia; Assistant General Manager / Director of U.S. Scouting – Danny McManus; Director of Football Operations – Matt Gulakow; U.S. Scout — Cyril Penn; Equipment Staff: Head Equipment Manager – Brad Fotty; Assistant Equipment Manager – Kevin Todd	Head Coaches: Head Coach – Mike O'Shea; Offensive coaches: Offensive Coordinator and Quarterbacks – Buck Pierce; Receivers – Kevin Bourgoin; Running Backs – Jason Hogan; Offensive Line – Marty Costello; Defensive coaches: Defensive Coordinator – Richie Hall; Defensive Line – Darrell Patterson; Defensive Backs – Jordan Younger; Pass Game Analyst and Linebackers – James Stanley; Special teams coaches: Special Teams Coordinator – Paul Boudreau, Jr.; Video Coaches: Video Coordinator – Josh Burton; → Coaching staff
