= 2023 BC Lions season =

CFL team season

- General manager: Rick Campbell; Neil McEvoy
- President: Duane Vienneau
- Head coach: Rick Campbell
- Home stadium: BC Place Stadium

Results
- Record: 12–6
- Division place: 2nd, West
- Playoffs: Lost West Final
- Team MOP: Vernon Adams
- Team MODP: Mathieu Betts
- Team MOC: Mathieu Betts
- Team MOOL: Jarell Broxton
- Team MOST: Sean Whyte
- Team MOR: Ryder Varga

Uniform
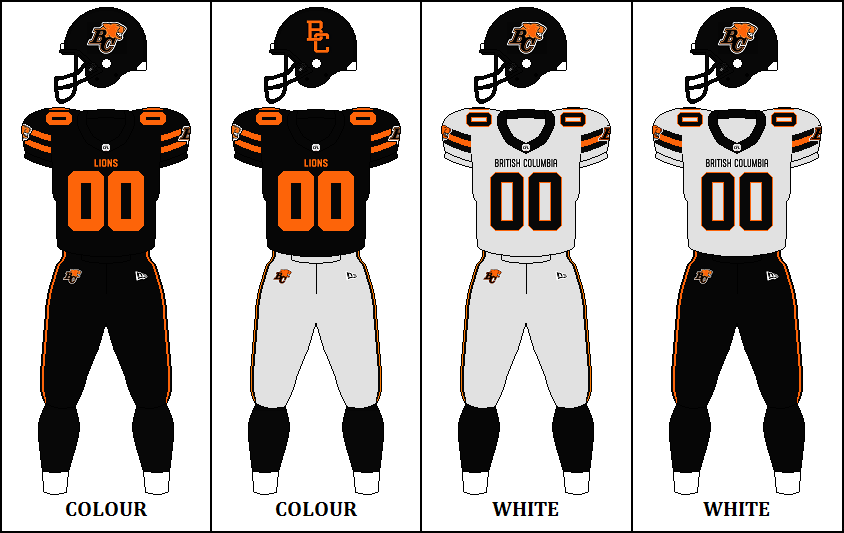

The 2023 BC Lions season was the 65th season for the team in the Canadian Football League (CFL) and their 69th overall. The Lions qualified for the playoffs for the second straight season following their week 14 win over the Edmonton Elks. After defeating the Calgary Stampeders in the West Semi-Final, the Lions lost to the Winnipeg Blue Bombers in the West Final.

The 2023 CFL season was the third season with Rick Campbell as the team's head coach and the second season with Campbell and Neil McEvoy as co-general managers.

== Offseason ==
=== CFL global draft ===
The 2023 CFL global draft took place on May 2, 2023. The Lions had the seventh selection in each round.

Round	Pick	Player	Position	Club/School	Nationality
1	7	Jevoni Robinson	WR	Barry	Jamaica
2	16	Junior Aho	DL	Southern Methodist	France

== CFL national draft ==
The 2023 CFL draft took place on May 2, 2023. The Lions had seven selections in the eight-round draft after trading away their first-round pick for Vernon Adams and their third-round pick for Terry Williams, but re-acquired a first-round pick from the Toronto Argonauts after trading Jordan Williams.

Aside from their traded picks, the Lions had the seventh selection in each of the eight rounds of the draft after losing the West Final and finishing second in the 2022 league standings.

Round	Pick	Player	Position	School	Hometown
1	9	Francis Bemiy	OL	Southern Utah	Montreal, QC
2	14	Siriman Bagayogo	DB	Guelph	Montreal, QC
4	34	Markcus Jean-Loscher	DL	St. Mary's	Toronto, ON
5	43	Charlie Ringland	DB	Saskatchewan	Winnipeg, MB
6	52	Jassin States-McClean	DB	St. Mary's	Halifax, NS
7	61	Jack Hinsperger	LB	Waterloo	Waterloo, ON
8	70	Troy Kowal	OL	Minot State	High River, AB

== Preseason ==
=== Schedule ===
Week	Game	Date	Kickoff	Opponent	Results		TV	Venue	Attendance	Summary
Week	Game	Date	Kickoff	Opponent	Score	Record	TV	Venue	Attendance	Summary
A	Bye									
B	1	Sat, May 27	4:00 p.m. PDT	at Saskatchewan Roughriders	L 27–30	0–1	None	Mosaic Stadium	22,908	Recap
C	2	Thu, June 1	7:30 p.m. PDT	vs. Calgary Stampeders	W 25–22	1–1	None	BC Place		Recap

# Games played with fog uniforms.

== Regular season ==
=== Standings ===
West Division
Team	GP	W	L	T	Pts	PF	PA	Div	Stk	
Winnipeg Blue Bombers	18	14	4	0	28	594	377	10–2	W4	Details
BC Lions	18	12	6	0	24	495	439	8–4	L1	Details
Calgary Stampeders	18	6	12	0	12	412	471	4–7	L1	Details
Saskatchewan Roughriders	18	6	12	0	12	387	551	5–7	L7	Details
Edmonton Elks	18	4	14	0	8	367	517	2–9	L4	Details

=== Schedule ===
Week	Game	Date	Kickoff	Opponent	Results		TV	Venue	Attendance	Summary
Week	Game	Date	Kickoff	Opponent	Score	Record	TV	Venue	Attendance	Summary
1	1	Thu, June 8	6:00 p.m. PDT	at Calgary Stampeders	W 25–15	1–0	TSN/CBSSN	McMahon Stadium	17,942	Recap
2	2	Sat, June 17	4:00 p.m. PDT	vs. Edmonton Elks	W 22–0	2–0	TSN/CBSSN	BC Place	33,103	Recap
3	3	Thu, June 22	5:30 p.m. PDT	at Winnipeg Blue Bombers	W 30–6	3–0	TSN	IG Field	25,662	Recap
4	4	Mon, July 3	4:00 p.m. PDT	at Toronto Argonauts	L 24–45	3–1	TSN/RDS/CBSSN	BMO Field	12,473	Recap
5	5	Sun, July 9	4:00 p.m. PDT	vs. Montreal Alouettes	W 35–19	4–1	TSN/RDS/CBSSN	BC Place	20,106	Recap
6	Bye									
7	6	Sat, July 22	4:00 p.m. PDT	vs. Saskatchewan Roughriders	W 19–9	5–1	TSN/CBSSN	BC Place	23,902	Recap
8	7	Sat, July 29	4:00 p.m. PDT	at Edmonton Elks	W 27–0	6–1	TSN/CBSSN	Commonwealth Stadium	24,613	Recap
9	8	Thu, Aug 3	5:30 p.m. PDT	at Winnipeg Blue Bombers	L 14–50	6–2	TSN/RDS/CBSSN	IG Field	30,874	Recap
10	9	Sat, Aug 12	4:00 p.m. PDT	vs. Calgary Stampeders	W 37–9	7–2	TSN/CBSSN	BC Place	20,524	Recap
11	10	Sun, Aug 20	4:00 p.m. PDT	at Saskatchewan Roughriders	L 29–34	7–3	TSN/CBSSN	Mosaic Stadium	27,483	Recap
12	11	Sat, Aug 26	4:00 p.m. PDT	vs. Hamilton Tiger-Cats	L 13–30	7–4	TSN	BC Place	22,053	Recap
13	12	Sat, Sept 2	4:00 p.m. PDT	at Montreal Alouettes	W 34–25	8–4	TSN/RDS	Molson Stadium	17,112	Recap
14	Bye									
15	13	Sat, Sept 16	4:00 p.m. PDT	vs. Ottawa Redblacks	W 41–37	9–4	TSN/RDS2	BC Place	20,403	Recap
16	14	Fri, Sept 22	6:30 p.m. PDT	at Edmonton Elks	W 37–29	10–4	TSN	Commonwealth Stadium	25,144	Recap
17	15	Fri, Sept 29	7:30 p.m. PDT	vs. Saskatchewan Roughriders	W 33–26	11–4	TSN	BC Place	22,735	Recap
18	16	Fri, Oct 6	7:00 p.m. PDT	vs. Winnipeg Blue Bombers	L 26–34 (OT)	11–5	TSN	BC Place	23,512	Recap
19	17	Fri, Oct 13	4:00 p.m. PDT	at Hamilton Tiger-Cats	W 33–30	12–5	TSN	Tim Hortons Field	23,891	Recap
20	18	Fri, Oct 20	7:00 p.m. PDT	vs. Calgary Stampeders	L 16–41	12–6	TSN	BC Place	22,537	Recap
21	Bye									

# Games played with blackout uniforms.
# Games played with fog uniforms.

== Post-season ==
=== Schedule ===
Game	Date	Kickoff	Opponent	Results		TV	Venue	Attendance	Summary
Game	Date	Kickoff	Opponent	Score	Record	TV	Venue	Attendance	Summary
West Semi-Final	Sat, Nov 4	3:30 p.m. PDT	vs. Calgary Stampeders	W 41–30	1–0	TSN/RDS	BC Place	30,149	Recap
West Final	Sat, Nov 11	3:30 p.m. PST	at Winnipeg Blue Bombers	L 13–24	1–1	TSN/RDS	IG Field	32,343	Recap

# Games played with blackout uniforms.
# Games played with fog uniforms.

== Roster ==
2023 BC Lions final roster
**Quarterbacks**: 3 Vernon Adams; 8 Dominique Davis; 17 Dane Evans; **Running backs**: 34 David Mackie; 25 Taquan Mizzell; 37 Dylan St. Pierre; **Receivers**: 86 Jevon Cottoy; 4 Keon Hatcher; 13 Alexander Hollins; 18 Justin McInnis; 19 Dominique Rhymes; 7 Lucky Whitehead; 87 Terry Williams	**Offensive linemen**: 69 Jarell Broxton T; 65 Sukh Chungh G; 51 Michael Couture C; 66 David Knevel G/T; 54 Andrew Peirson G; 59 Kent Perkins T; **Defensive linemen**: 94 Joshua Archibald DE; 92 Josh Banks DT; 58 Woody Baron DT; 98 Francis Bemiy DT; 90 Mathieu Betts DE; 49 Tibo Debaillie DT; 56 David Ménard DE; 95 Marcus Moore DT; 47 Sione Teuhema DE	**Linebackers**: 44 Isaiah Guzylak-Messam; 20 Bo Lokombo; 32 Maxime Rouyer; 48 Ryder Varga; 2 Josh Woods; **Defensive backs**: 21 Siriman Bagayogo; 23 Adrian Greene; 9 Mike Jones; 6 T. J. Lee; 36 Quincy Mauger; 1 Garry Peters; 24 Patrice Rene; 33 Emmanuel Rugamba; 14 Marcus Sayles	**Special teams**: 11 Stefan Flintoft P/K; 45 Riley Pickett LS; 10 Sean Whyte K; **Practice roster**: 12 Chase Brice QB; 80 Ayden Eberhardt WR; 27 JaQuan Hardy RB; 62 Tyler Packer G; 41 Brooks Parker LB; 89 Josh Pearson WR; 83 Jevoni Robinson WR; 28 Shaun Shivers RB	**Injured list**: 91 Nathan Cherry DT; 29 Jalon Edwards-Cooper DB; 26 Kienan LaFrance RB; 43 Jack Hinsperger LB; 46 Ben Hladik LB; 50 Phillip Norman G; 88 Daniel Petermann SB; 57 Chris Schleuger T; 93 Amir Siddiq DE; 99 Nick Usher DE
Italics indicate American player • **Bold** indicates Global player

== Coaching staff ==
BC Lions staff
Front Office and Support Staff: Owner – Amar Doman; President and CEO – Rick LeLacheur; Vice President, Business – George Chayka; Chief Operating Officer – Duane Vienneau; General Managers – Rick Campbell and Neil McEvoy; Director of Football Operations – Neil McEvoy; Assistant General Manager and Director of Player Personnel – Ryan Rigmaiden; Director of Canadian Scouting & CFL Draft Coordinator – Rob Ralph; Video Coordinator – Derek Oswalt; Head Athletic Therapist – Tristan Sandhu; Equipment Manager – Aaron Yeung	Head Coaches: Head Coach – Rick Campbell; Offensive Coaches: Offensive Coordinator – Jordan Maksymic; Receivers – Jason Tucker; Offensive Line – Kelly Bates; Running backs – Trysten Dyce; Defensive Coaches: Defensive Coordinator – Ryan Phillips; Defensive Line – John Bowman; Linebackers – Travis Brown; Defensive Assistant – Tanya Walter; Special Teams Coaches: Special Teams Consultant – Mike Benevides; Special Teams Assistant – Derek Oswalt; → Coaching staff
