= James Peter =

Canadian gridiron football player (born 1999)

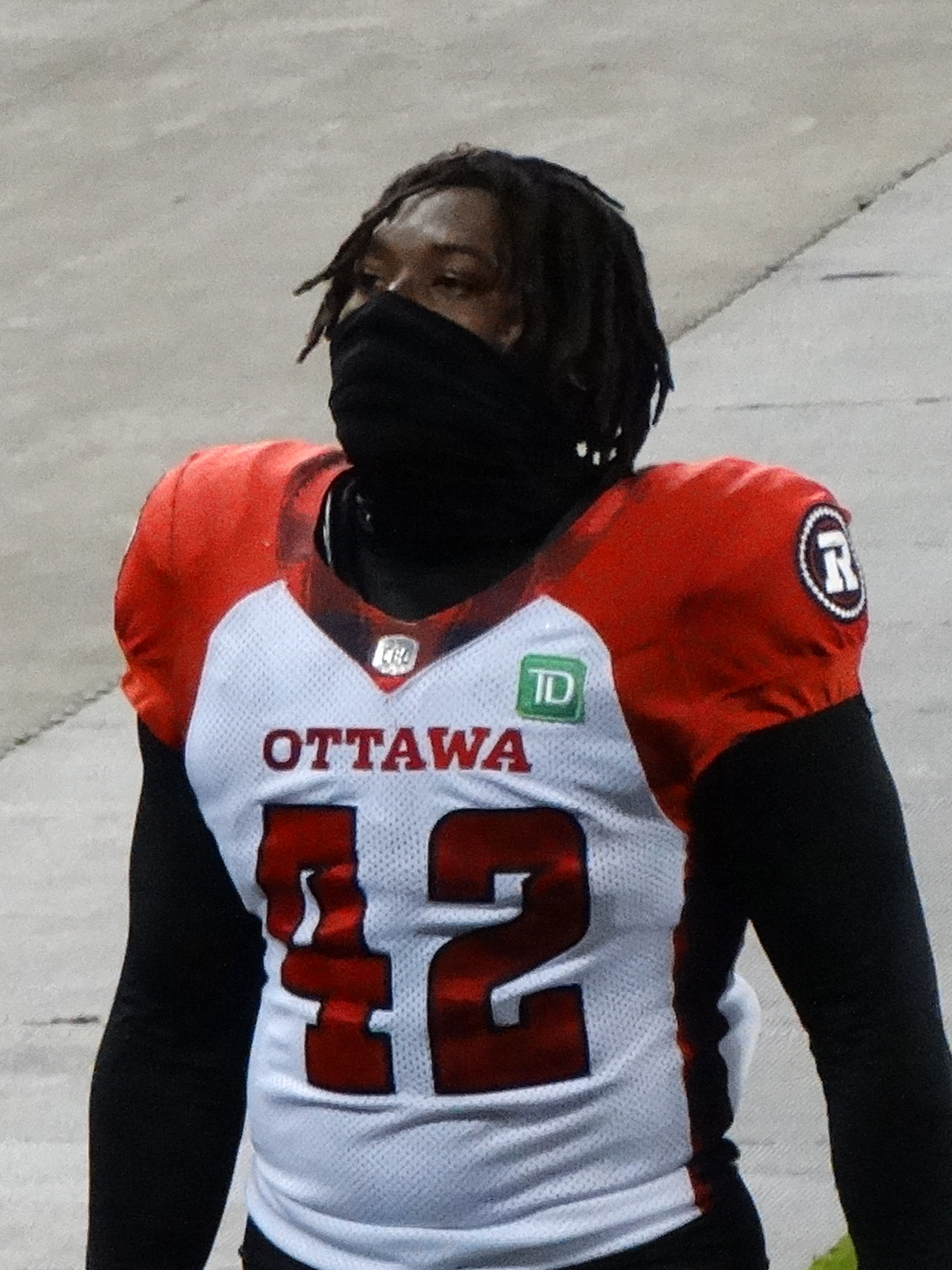
- Peter with the Ottawa Redblacks in 2023

No. 42 – Ottawa Redblacks
- Position: Linebacker
- Roster status: Active
- CFL status: National

Personal information
- Born: June 9, 1999 (age 27); Ottawa, Ontario, Canada
- Listed height: 5 ft 10 in (1.78 m)
- Listed weight: 220 lb (100 kg)

Career information
- High school: St. Mother Teresa High School
- University: Ottawa (2017-2021)
- CFL draft: 2022: 2nd round, 12th overall pick

Career history
- 2023–present: Ottawa Redblacks
- Stats at CFL.ca

James Peter (born June 9, 1999) is a Canadian professional football linebacker for the Ottawa Redblacks of the Canadian Football League (CFL). He played U Sports football for the University of Ottawa and was selected in the second round of the 2023 CFL draft by the Redblacks.

== Early life ==
Peter was born June 9, 1999 in Ottawa, Ontario. He attended St. Mother Teresa High School in Ottawa, and played for the school's Canadian football team from grades 9-12 as a running back and linebacker.

== University career ==
Peter attended the University of Ottawa, where he played for the Gee-Gees from 2017 to 2021.

== Professional career ==
Pre-draft measurables
Height	Weight	40-yard dash	20-yard shuttle	Three-cone drill	Vertical jump	Broad jump	Bench press
5 ft 10 in (1.78 m)	214 lb (97 kg)	4.72 s	4.28 s	7.22 s	34.0 in (0.86 m)	9 ft 3 5/8 in (2.84 m)	14 reps
All values from CFL Combine

Peter was ranked the 19th-best prospect for the 2023 CFL draft, according to the CFL Scouting Bureau's final rankings. He was ultimately chosen 12th overall by the Ottawa Redblacks and signed with the team on May 9, 2023. He began the 2023 season on the injured list before being moved to the practice roster in week 8. Peter then made his professional debut on August 19, 2023, against the Montreal Alouettes. He played in the final nine games of the regular season where he recorded five special teams tackles.
