= Cole Tucker (Canadian football) =

American gridiron football player (born 1999)

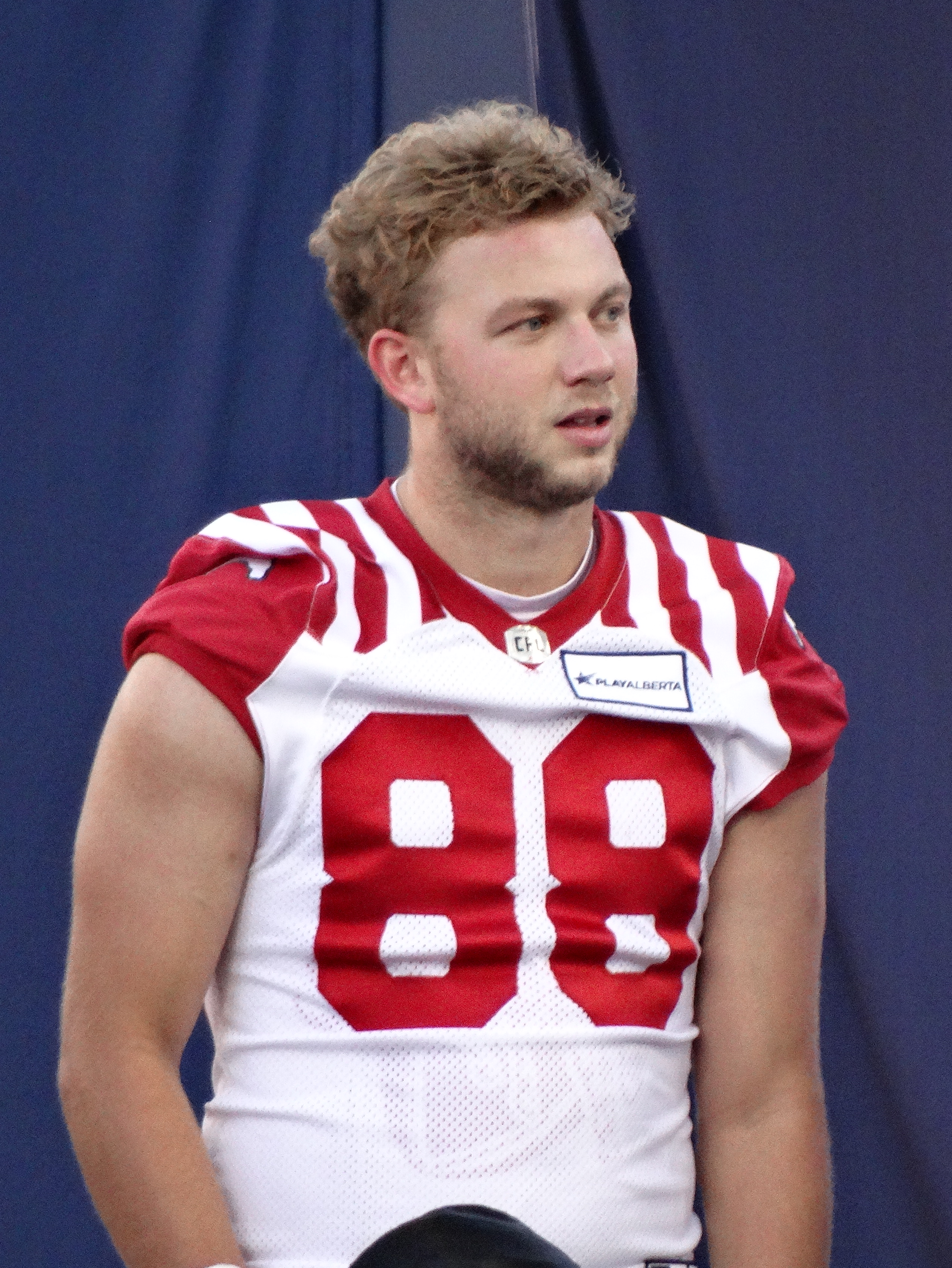
- Tucker with the Calgary Stampeders in 2024

No. 88
- Position: Wide receiver

Personal information
- Born: June 7, 1999 (age 27); DeKalb, Illinois, U. S.
- Listed height: 6 ft 2 in (1.88 m)
- Listed weight: 195 lb (88 kg)

Career information
- College: Northern Illinois
- CFL draft: 2023: 1st round, 4th overall pick

Career history
- 2023–2024: Calgary Stampeders
- Stats at CFL.ca

Cole Tucker (born June 7, 1999) is an American former professional football wide receiver who played two seasons for the Calgary Stampeders of the Canadian Football League (CFL).

== College career ==
Tucker played college football at Northern Illinois University, in his hometown of DeKalb, Illinois. In five seasons for the Huskies, Tucker had 155 receptions and 2,030 receiving yards along with 10 touchdowns. Tucker also returned 43 punts for 156 yards in his NIU career.

== Professional career ==
Pre-draft measurables
Height	Weight	Arm length	Hand span	Wingspan	40-yard dash	10-yard split	20-yard split	20-yard shuttle	Three-cone drill	Vertical jump	Broad jump	Bench press
6 ft 1 in (1.85 m)	193 lb (88 kg)	30 3/8 in (0.77 m)	8 5/8 in (0.22 m)	6 ft 1 3/4 in (1.87 m)	4.67 s	1.58 s	2.76 s	4.23 s	6.91 s	37.0 in (0.94 m)	9 ft 7 in (2.92 m)	10 reps
All values from Pro Day

The Calgary Stampeders selected Tucker in the first round, fourth overall, in the 2023 CFL draft. He is tied with Donnavan Carter as the second highest NIU Husky drafted in the CFL Draft, and the 13th player overall from Northern Illinois to be taken in the CFL Draft. Tucker was signed following his participation in a minicamp tryout with the Minnesota Vikings of the National Football League. He made the Stampeders' opening day roster and made his professional debut on June 8, 2023, against the BC Lions. He played in 11 regular season games, starting in four, where he had 14 receptions for 192 yards and one touchdown.

In 2024, Tucker played in 15 regular season games where he had 20 receptions for 156 yards. Shortly after the season ended, he announced his retirement on November 23, 2024.

== Personal life ==
Tucker's father Brett Tucker played defensive back at Northern Illinois and was a selection in the 1990 NFL draft for the Houston Oilers, though he never played a game for the team. He qualifies for National status as his mother, former NIU gymnast Cindy Tucker (née Hampton) is a native of Brandon, Manitoba, Canada.
