= Theo Grant =

Canadian gridiron football player (born 2000)

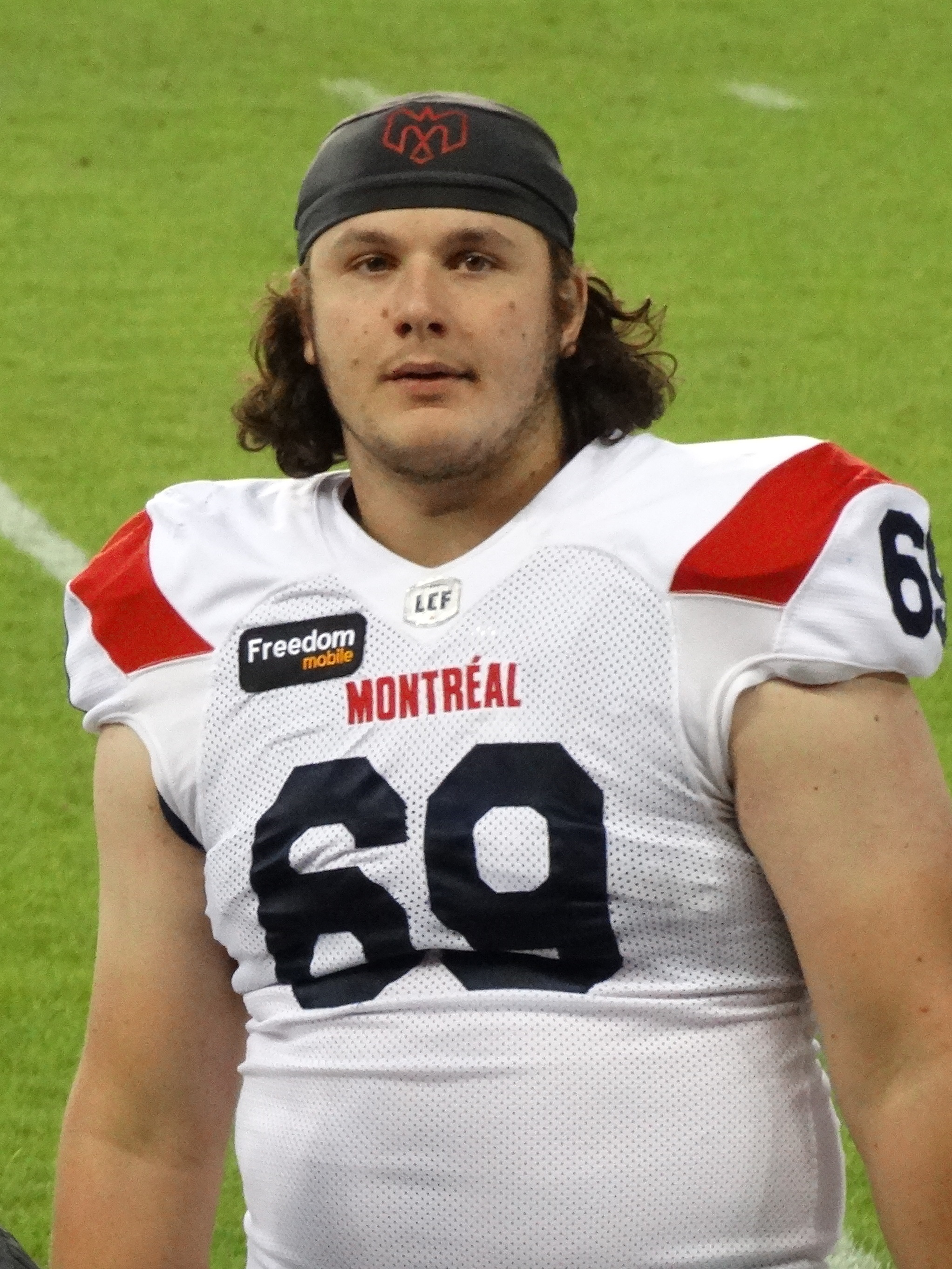
- Grant with the Montreal Alouettes in 2024

Queen's Gaels
- Position: Offensive lineman
- Roster status: Active
- CFL status: National

Personal information
- Born: October 31, 2000 (age 26); Halifax, Nova Scotia, Canada
- Listed height: 6 ft 3 in (1.91 m)
- Listed weight: 280 lb (127 kg)

Career information
- Position: Offensive lineman
- University: Queen's
- CFL draft: 2023: 4th round, 32nd overall pick

Career history

Playing
- 2023: Montreal Alouettes*
- 2024: Montreal Alouettes
- * Offseason or practice squad member only

Coaching
- 2025–present: Queen's Gaels
- Stats at CFL.ca

Theo Grant (born October 31, 2000) is a Canadian football coach and former offensive lineman who is the assistant offensive line coach for the Queen's Gaels of U Sports football.

== University career ==
Grant played U Sports football for the Queen's Gaels from 2019 to 2023. He did not play in 2020 due to the cancellation of the 2020 U Sports football season.

== Professional career ==
Pre-draft measurables
Height	Weight	40-yard dash	20-yard shuttle	Three-cone drill	Vertical jump	Broad jump	Bench press
6 ft 2 7/8 in (1.90 m)	280 lb (127 kg)	5.31 s	4.85 s	7.76 s	29.0 in (0.74 m)	7 ft 10 5/8 in (2.40 m)	18 reps
All values from CFL Combine

Grant was drafted in the fourth round, 32nd overall, by the Montreal Alouettes in the 2023 CFL draft and signed with the team on May 11, 2023. Following 2023 training camp, he returned to Queen's to complete his university eligibility.

On January 10, 2024, it was announced that Grant had re-signed with the Alouettes to a three-year contract. He earned a roster spot in training camp in 2024 and made his professional debut as a backup offensive lineman on June 7, 2024, against the Winnipeg Blue Bombers. He played in 16 regular season games in 2024. He was released in the following offseason on May 1, 2025.

== Coaching career ==
Grant joined the Queen's Gaels in 2025 as an assistant offensive line coach.
