= Jake Kelly (Canadian football) =

Canadian gridiron football player (born 1999)

- Kelly with the Winnipeg Blue Bombers in 2026

No. 16 – Winnipeg Blue Bombers
- Position: Defensive back
- Roster status: Active
- CFL status: National

Personal information
- Born: April 10, 1999 (age 27); Markham, Ontario, Canada
- Listed height: 5 ft 11 in (1.80 m)
- Listed weight: 186 lb (84 kg)

Career information
- High school: Bill Crothers Secondary
- University: Bishop's (2018–2022)
- CFL draft: 2023: 2nd round, 15th overall pick

Career history
- 2023–present: Winnipeg Blue Bombers
- Stats at CFL.ca

Jake Kelly (born April 10, 1999) is a Canadian professional football defensive back for the Winnipeg Blue Bombers of the Canadian Football League (CFL).

== University career ==
Kelly played U Sports football for the Bishop's Gaiters from 2018 to 2022.

== Professional career ==
Pre-draft measurables
Height	Weight	40-yard dash	20-yard shuttle	Three-cone drill	Vertical jump	Broad jump	Bench press
5 ft 10 7/8 in (1.80 m)	182 lb (83 kg)	4.56 s	4.27 s	6.91 s	40.5 in (1.03 m)	10 ft 2 1/2 in (3.11 m)	14 reps
All values from CFL Combine

Kelly was drafted in the second round, 15th overall, by the Winnipeg Blue Bombers in the 2023 CFL draft and signed with the team on May 5, 2023. He made the team's active roster following training camp and played in his first professional game on June 10, 2023, against the Hamilton Tiger-Cats, where he had one special teams tackle and one forced fumble. After six games, he was assigned to the practice roster, but returned to play in the last four games of the regular season, including his first career start in the season finale. Kelly played in ten games in 2023 where he had two defensive tackles, six special teams tackles, and one forced fumble. He was on the injured list during the team's post-season run that year, including the Blue Bombers' loss to the Montreal Alouettes in the 110th Grey Cup game.

In 2024, Kelly spent the first eight games on the injured list due to a broken arm. He played in the last ten regular season games, starting in two, where he recorded three defensive tackles and four special teams tackles.
