= Michael Brodrique =

Canadian gridiron football player (born 1998)

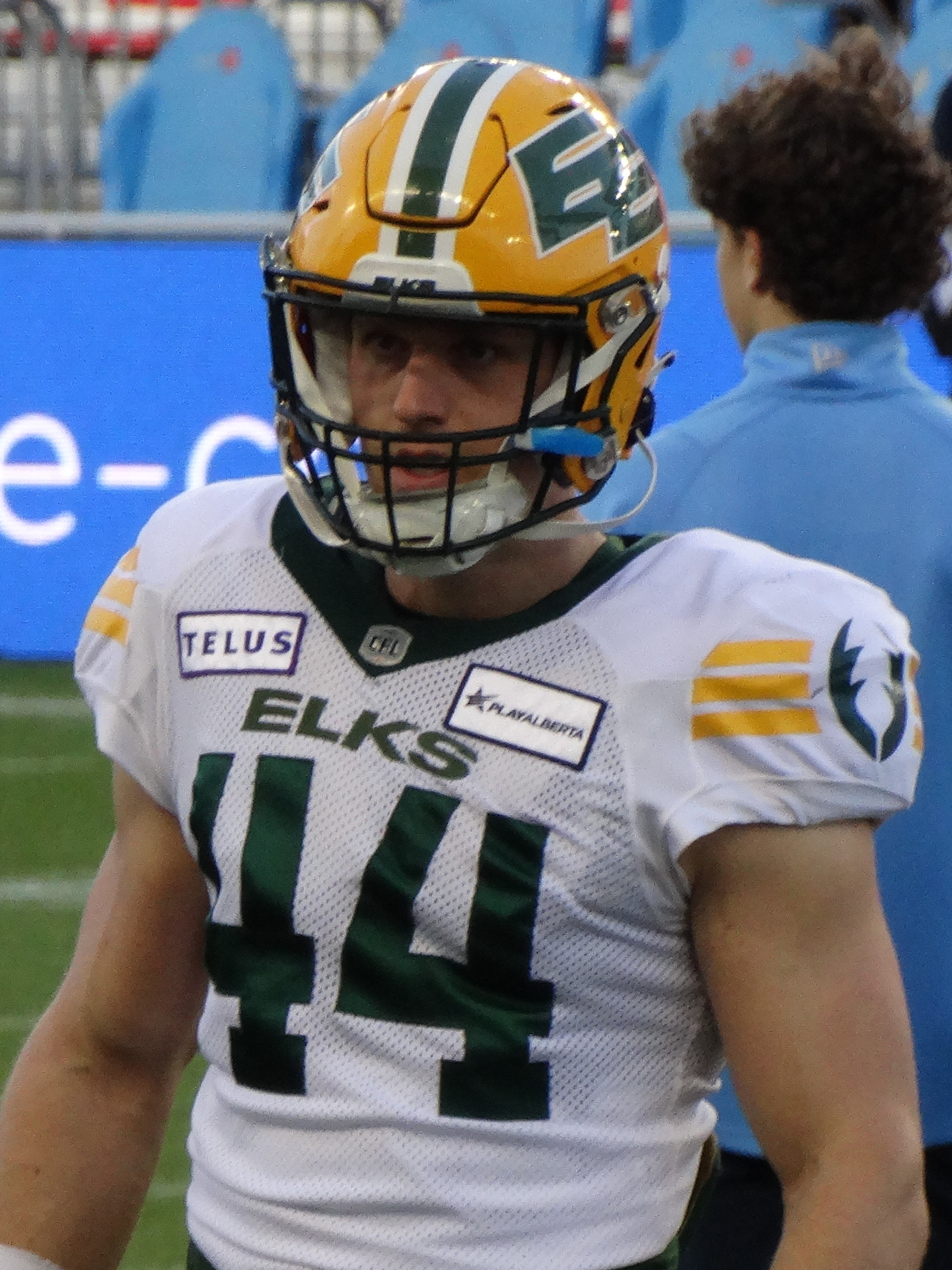
- Brodrique with the Edmonton Elks in 2023

Ottawa Redblacks
- Position: Linebacker
- Roster status: Active
- CFL status: National

Personal information
- Born: August 21, 1998 (age 28); Sainte-Marthe-sur-le-Lac, Quebec, Canada
- Listed height: 6 ft 3 in (1.91 m)
- Listed weight: 227 lb (103 kg)

Career information
- University: Montreal
- CFL draft: 2023: 1st round, 2nd overall pick

Career history
- 2023–2025: Edmonton Elks
- 2026–present: Ottawa Redblacks
- Stats at CFL.ca

Michael Brodrique (born August 21, 1998) is a Canadian professional football linebacker for the Ottawa Redblacks of the Canadian Football League (CFL).

== University career ==
Brodrique played U Sports football for the Montreal Carabins. He played in 22 games where he had 68.5 tackles, 9.5 sacks, one interception, one forced fumble, and two fumble recoveries.

== Professional career ==
Pre-draft measurables
Height	Weight	40-yard dash	20-yard shuttle	Three-cone drill	Vertical jump	Broad jump	Bench press
6 ft 1 3/4 in (1.87 m)	222 lb (101 kg)	4.59 s	4.28 s	7.35 s	34.5 in (0.88 m)	9 ft 9 1/8 in (2.97 m)	17 reps
All values from CFL Combine

=== Edmonton Elks ===
Brodrique was ranked as the 11th best player in the Canadian Football League's Amateur Scouting Bureau final rankings for players eligible in the 2023 CFL draft and was the top ranked player from U Sports football. He was then drafted in the first round, second overall, by the Edmonton Elks in the 2023 CFL draft and signed with the team on May 8, 2023. Following training camp in 2023, he made the team's active roster and made his professional debut on June 11, 2023, against the Saskatchewan Roughriders. He played in all 18 regular season games in his rookie year where he recorded eight special teams tackles.

In 2024, Brodrique played in 14 games where he had two defensive tackles, ten special teams tackles, one sack. He played in the first six games in the 2025 season, but sat out the rest of the season due to injury. In his limited time, Brodrique recorded just one special teams tackle that year. He became a free agent upon the expiry of his contract on February 10, 2026.

=== Ottawa Redblacks ===
On February 12, 2026, it was announced that Brodrique had signed a one-year contract with the Ottawa Redblacks.
