= Reece Martin =

Canadian gridiron football player (born 2000)

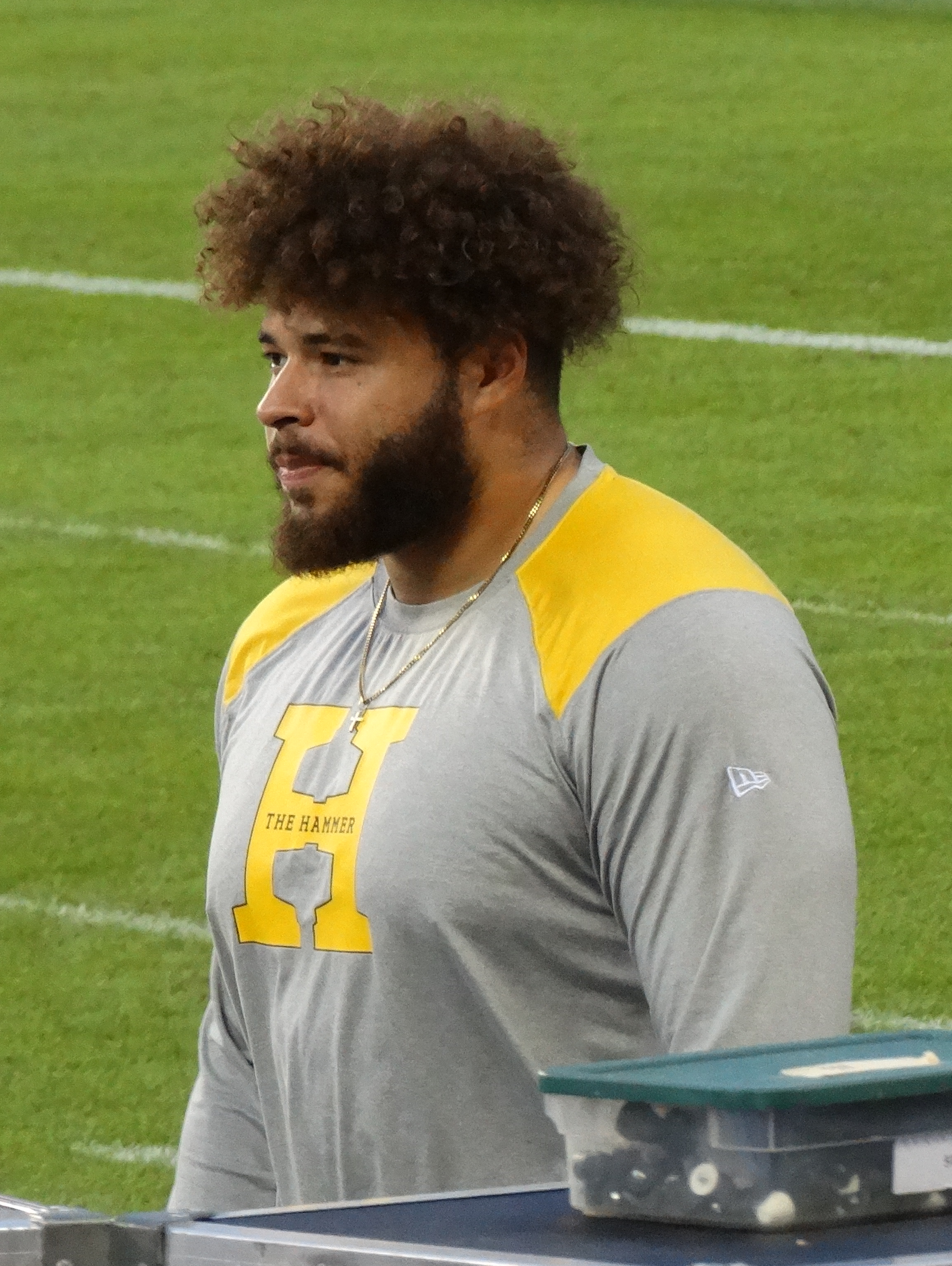
- Martin with the Hamilton Tiger-Cats in 2024

Profile
- Position: Defensive lineman

Personal information
- Born: September 15, 2000 (age 26); Moncton, New Brunswick, Canada
- Listed height: 6 ft 4 in (1.93 m)
- Listed weight: 285 lb (129 kg)

Career information
- High school: Harrison Trimble High School
- University: Mount Allison
- CFL draft: 2023: 4th round, 31st overall pick

Career history
- 2024: Hamilton Tiger-Cats
- 2025: Edmonton Elks*
- * Offseason or practice squad member only
- Stats at CFL.ca

Reece Martin (born September 15, 2000) is a Canadian professional football defensive lineman. He previously played for the Hamilton Tiger-Cats of the Canadian Football League (CFL).

== University career ==
Martin played U Sports football for the Mount Allison Mounties from 2018 to 2023. After sitting out in 2020 due to the cancelled 2020 U Sports football season, he played in 37 games with the team where he had 89 total tackles, 12.5 sacks, 24 tackles for loss, two forced fumbles, and two fumble recoveries.

== Professional career ==
Pre-draft measurables
Height	Weight	40-yard dash	20-yard shuttle	Three-cone drill	Vertical jump	Broad jump	Bench press
6 ft 3 3/8 in (1.91 m)	278 lb (126 kg)	5.28 s	4.65 s	8.28 s	27.5 in (0.70 m)	8 ft 9 7/8 in (2.69 m)	21 reps
All values from CFL Combine

Martin was selected by the Hamilton Tiger-Cats in the fourth round, 31st overall, of the 2023 CFL draft and signed with the team on May 10, 2023. Following training camp in 2023, he accepted a practice roster spot. However, he was placed on the suspended list on June 15, 2023, as he intended to return to the Mount Allison Mounties. He was re-signed at the end of the season on November 22, 2023.

Martin made the team's active roster following training camp in 2024 and had his professional debut on June 8, 2024, against the Calgary Stampeders. He played in three regular season games while spending the rest of the season on the practice roster. Martin was released as 2025 training camp opened on May 11, 2025.

On May 23, 2025, it was announced that Martin had signed with the Edmonton Elks. He was released on June 1, 2025.

Martin currently plays for the Moncton Mustangs of the Maritime Football League.
