= Jamieson Sheahan =

American gridiron football player (born 1997)

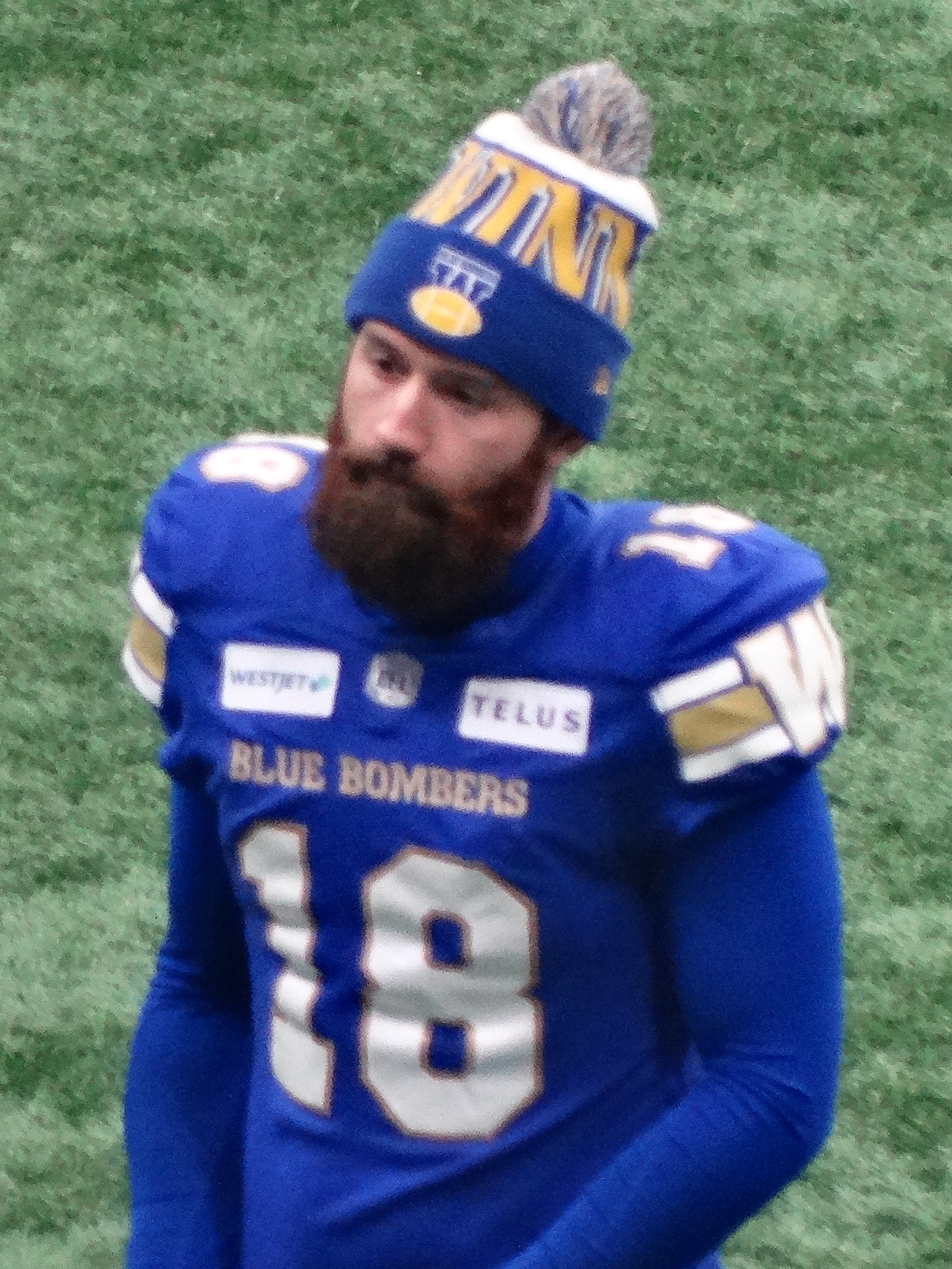
- Sheahan with the Winnipeg Blue Bombers in 2024

No. 18 – Winnipeg Blue Bombers
- Position: Punter
- Roster status: Active
- CFL status: Global

Personal information
- Born: May 17, 1997 (age 29); Bendigo, Australia
- Listed height: 5 ft 11 in (1.80 m)
- Listed weight: 199 lb (90 kg)

Career information
- High school: Geelong Grammar School
- College: California

Career history
- 2022–present: Winnipeg Blue Bombers
- Stats at CFL.ca

Jamieson Sheahan (born May 17, 1997) is an Australian professional football punter for the Winnipeg Blue Bombers of the Canadian Football League (CFL).

== Professional career ==
Pre-draft measurables
| Height | Weight | Arm length | Hand span | Wingspan |
|---|---|---|---|---|
| 5 ft 11 1/4 in (1.81 m) | 205 lb (93 kg) | 30 in (0.76 m) | 9 1/8 in (0.23 m) | 5 ft 11 in (1.80 m) |
All values from Pro Day

Sheahan joined the Winnipeg Blue Bombers in the 2023 season after he was selected eighth overall in the 2023 CFL global draft. He won the starting job as punter by beating out veteran Marc Liegghio and fellow global player Karl Schmitz during the Bombers' 2023 preseason.

== Personal ==
He grew up in Bendigo, Australia and initially began playing Aussie rules football. Sheahan played for the Essendon Football Club in the Victorian Football League (VFL), winning their best first year player award in 2018. After training to become a punter with ProKick Australia, he moved to the United States to attend college at University of California, Berkeley in 2020. He finished two degrees at Berkeley, including his master's degree in education and declared for the NFL draft but was not selected. Sheahan's master's degree was focused on the administrative side of education and he aspires to be an athletic director at an American college. He has battled with mental health issues and Sheahan sees himself as an advocate for the issue saying "We’ve got to stop this idea where (we) can't talk about it. By doing a Master's in education, hopefully, I can change the policies in these schools to better support student-athletes."
