= Ryder Varga =

Canadian gridiron football player (born 1999)

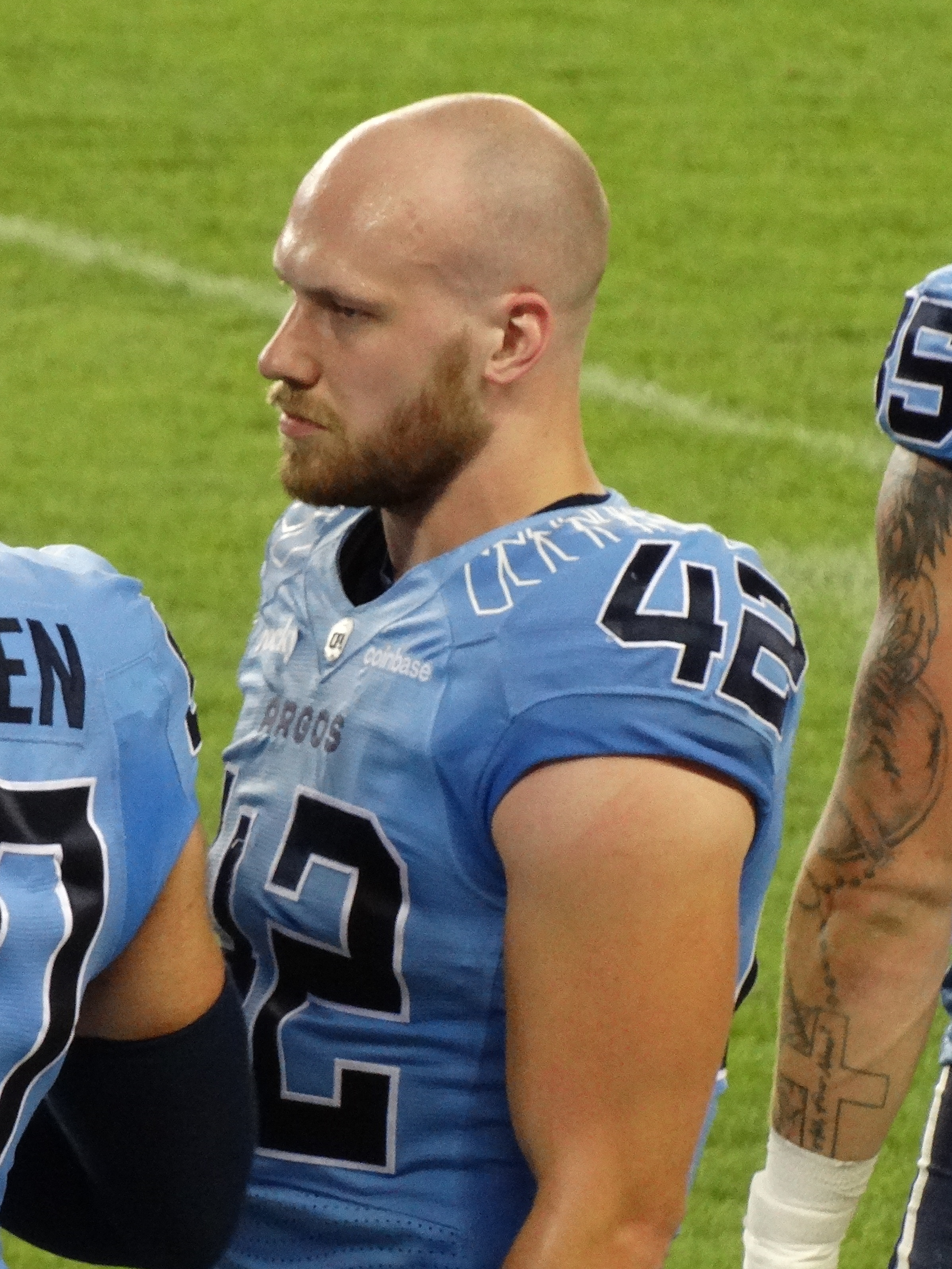
- Varga with the Toronto Argonauts in 2025

Saskatchewan Roughriders
- Position: Linebacker
- Roster status: Active
- CFL status: National

Personal information
- Born: April 30, 1999 (age 27); Regina, Saskatchewan, Canada
- Listed height: 6 ft 3 in (1.91 m)
- Listed weight: 225 lb (102 kg)

Career information
- University: Regina
- CFL draft: 2022: 3rd round, 29th overall pick

Career history
- 2022: BC Lions*
- 2023–2024: BC Lions
- 2025: Toronto Argonauts
- 2026–present: Saskatchewan Roughriders
- * Offseason or practice squad member only

Awards and highlights
- First-team All-Canadian (2022)
- Stats at CFL.ca

Ryder Varga (born April 30, 1999) is a Canadian professional football linebacker for the Saskatchewan Roughriders of the Canadian Football League (CFL).

== University career ==
Varga played U Sports football for the Regina Rams from 2017 to 2022. He played in 32 games where he had 157 total tackles, seven sacks, and four forced fumbles.

== Professional career ==
Pre-draft measurables
Height	Weight	40-yard dash	20-yard shuttle	Three-cone drill	Vertical jump	Broad jump	Bench press
6 ft 1 3/8 in (1.86 m)	229 lb (104 kg)	4.79 s	4.33 s	7.03 s	35.0 in (0.89 m)	9 ft 8 1/8 in (2.95 m)	10 reps
All values from CFL Combine

=== BC Lions ===
Varga was drafted in the third round, 29th overall, by the BC Lions in the 2022 CFL draft and signed with the team on May 11, 2022. However, following training camp, he returned to Regina for his final year of eligibility.

Varga re-signed with the Lions on November 28, 2022. He made the team following training camp in 2023 and played in the team's season opening game on June 8, 2023, against the Calgary Stampeders. He played in all 18 regular season games where he had nine defensive tackles, 13 special teams tackles, and one quarterback sack. In 2024, Varga played in 18 regular season games where he had 73 defensive tackles, five special teams tackles, and one sack.

=== Toronto Argonauts ===
On January 6, 2025, Varga was traded with a 2026 CFL draft pick to the Toronto Argonauts in exchange for Dejon Allen. He played in 13 regular season games where he recorded 10 special teams tackles. He was released shortly before the start of training camp in the following offseason on April 29, 2026.

=== Saskatchewan Roughriders ===
On May 6, 2026, it was announced that Varga had signed a two-year contract with the Saskatchewan Roughriders.
