= Siriman Bagayogo =

Canadian gridiron football player (born 1997)

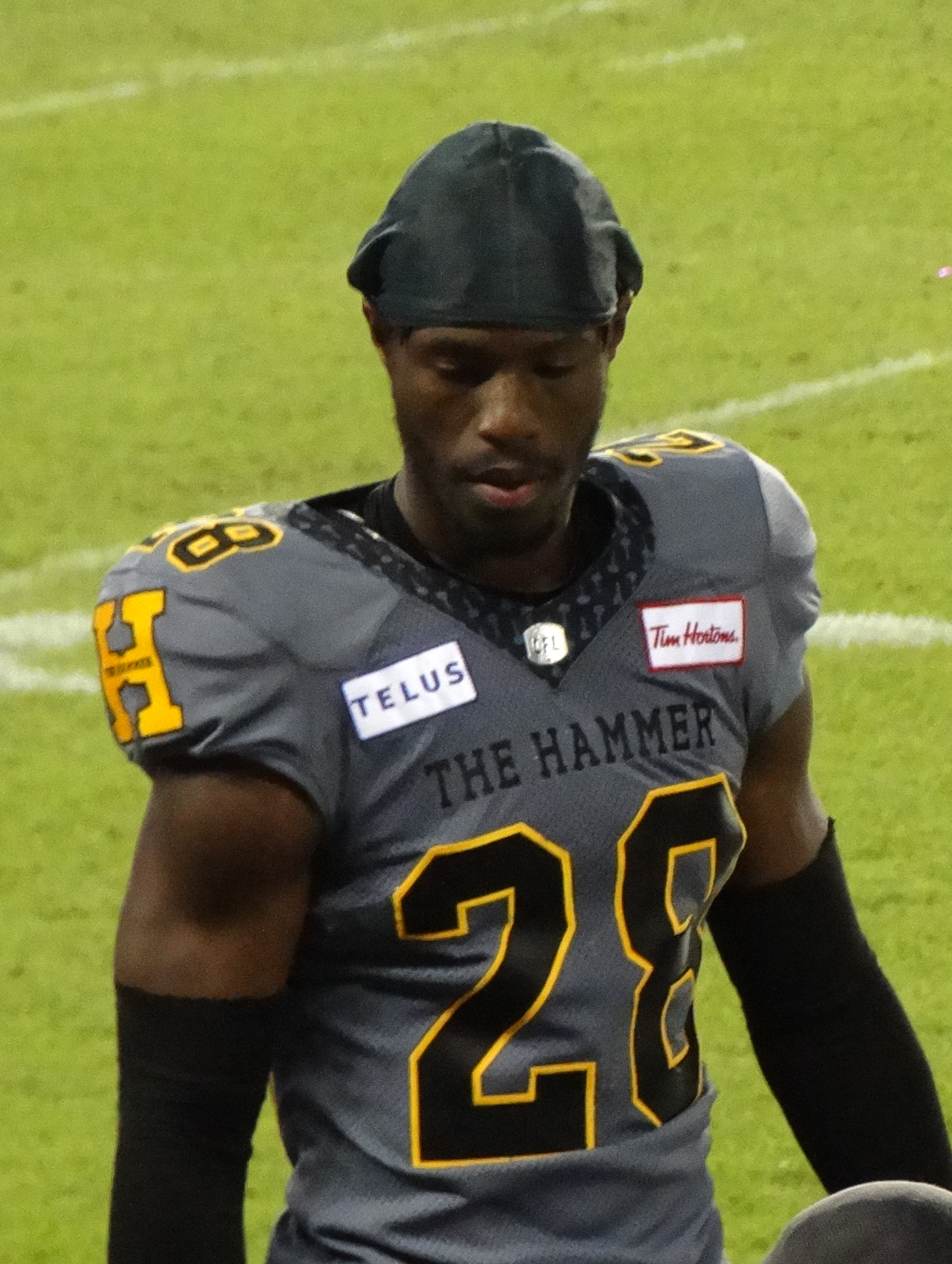
- Bagayogo with the Hamilton Tiger-Cats in 2024

Profile
- Position: Defensive back

Personal information
- Born: November 22, 1997 (age 28); Bois-des-Filion, Quebec, Canada
- Listed height: 6 ft 3 in (1.91 m)
- Listed weight: 195 lb (88 kg)

Career information
- CEGEP: Champlain College Lennoxville
- University: Guelph
- CFL draft: 2023: 2nd round, 14th overall pick

Career history
- 2023: BC Lions
- 2024–2025: Hamilton Tiger-Cats
- Stats at CFL.ca

Siriman Harrison Bagayogo (born November 22, 1997) is a Canadian professional football defensive back. He most recently played for the Hamilton Tiger-Cats of the Canadian Football League (CFL).

== University career ==
Following three years of CEGEP with the Champlain College Lennoxville, Bagayogo played U Sports football for the Guelph Gryphons from 2019 to 2022. He played in 22 regular season games where he had 40 tackles, two interceptions, and four pass knockdowns. He did not play in 2020 due to the cancellation of the 2020 U Sports football season and remained draft-eligible for the Canadian Football League in 2023.

== Professional career ==
=== BC Lions ===
Bagayogo was drafted in the second round, 14th overall, in the 2023 CFL draft by the BC Lions and signed with the team on May 9, 2023. Following training camp in 2023, he made the team's opening day roster and made his professional debut on June 9, 2023, against the Calgary Stampeders. After sitting out three games due to injury, Bagayogo played in every other regular season game, playing in 15 games and recording six defensive tackles and three special teams tackles.

Bagayogo attended training camp with the Lions in 2024, but was part of the final cuts on June 2, 2024.

=== Hamilton Tiger-Cats ===
On June 12, 2024, it was announced that Bagayogo had signed with the Hamilton Tiger-Cats. In 2024, he played in 13 regular season games where he recorded one defensive tackle and eight special teams tackles. He began the 2025 season on the injured list before being moved to the practice roster. He was then released on July 1, 2025.
