= Dayton Black =

Canadian gridiron football player (born 1999)

Profile
- Position: Offensive lineman

Personal information
- Born: December 13, 1999 (age 26); Brandon, Manitoba, Canada
- Listed height: 6 ft 5 in (1.96 m)
- Listed weight: 295 lb (134 kg)

Career information
- High school: Neelin (Brandon)
- University: Saskatchewan
- CFL draft: 2023: 1st round, 6th overall pick

Career history
- 2023–2024: Hamilton Tiger-Cats
- 2025: Ottawa Redblacks
- 2026*: Saskatchewan Roughriders
- Stats at CFL.ca

Dayton Black (born December 13, 1999) is a Canadian professional football offensive lineman.

== Early life ==
Black played high school football at Neelin High School in Brandon, Manitoba as a quarterback. His senior year, he set Winnipeg High School Football League (WHSFL) single-season passing records in completions with 119, attempts with 219, and yards with 1,981. He also set single-game WHSFL passing records in completions with 26, attempts with 43 and yards with 493. Black played defense as well in high school, recording 23 tackles, two forced fumbles and one blocked kick his senior year. He grew up a Winnipeg Blue Bombers fan.

== University career ==
Black played U Sports football for the Saskatchewan Huskies, spending his first season as a defensive lineman before switching to offensive tackle the following year. He was a Canada West All-Star in 2022. In college, he spent 16 days in the hospital and lost 35 pounds after a bacterial infection in his knee.

== Professional career ==
Pre-draft measurables
Height	Weight	40-yard dash	20-yard shuttle	Three-cone drill	Vertical jump	Broad jump
6 ft 5 1/2 in (1.97 m)	298 lb (135 kg)	5.62 s	4.91 s	7.82 s	27.5 in (0.70 m)	8 ft 2 in (2.49 m)
All values from CFL Combine

=== Hamilton Tiger-Cats ===
Black was selected by the Hamilton Tiger-Cats of the Canadian Football League (CFL) in the first round, with the sixth overall pick, of the 2023 CFL draft. He signed with the team on May 8, 2023. He was placed on injured reserve on June 8 and activated from injured reserve on June 17, 2023. Black dressed in 17 games, starting one, for the Tiger-Cats in 2023. He began the 2024 season on the injured list before moving to the practice roster in September and then being released on October 15, 2025. He re-signed with the Tiger-Cats on November 21, 2024, but was released part way through 2025 training camp on May 14, 2025.

=== Ottawa Redblacks ===
On June 9, 2025, it was announced that Black had signed with the Ottawa Redblacks. He dressed in five games for the Redblacks before being demoted to the practice roster on July 16 and released on August 2, 2025.

=== Saskatchewan Roughriders ===
Following the 2025 season, Black signed with the Saskatchewan Roughriders on December 17, 2025, taking him back to the same province where he played university football. He was released on May 13, 2026.
