= Campbell Fair =

Canadian football player (born 2000)

Profile
- Positions: Placekicker, punter

Personal information
- Born: April 10, 2000 (age 26); Oakville, Ontario, Canada
- Listed height: 6 ft 0 in (1.83 m)
- Listed weight: 165 lb (75 kg)

Career information
- High school: Nicholson Catholic (Belleville, Ontario)
- University: Ottawa (2018–2022)
- CFL draft: 2023: 6th round, 51st overall pick

Career history
- Calgary Stampeders (2023)*; Saskatchewan Roughriders (2023)*; Calgary Stampeders (2024)*; Edmonton Elks (2024)*; Saskatchewan Roughriders (2025)
- * Offseason or practice squad member only

Awards and highlights
- OUA second-team All-Star (2022)
- Stats at CFL.ca

Campbell Fair (born April 10, 2000) is a Canadian professional football kicker. He previously played for the Saskatchewan Roughriders of the Canadian Football League (CFL). He played U Sports football at Ottawa.

== Early life ==
Campbell Fair was born on April 10, 2000, in Oakville, Ontario. For high school, he attended Nicholson Catholic College in Belleville, Ontario.

== University career ==
Fair first played U Sports football for the Ottawa Gee-Gees of the University of Ottawa from 2018 to 2022, playing in 28 games. The 2020 U Sports football season was cancelled due to the COVID-19 pandemic. He made a school-record 55-yard field goal in 2022. Fair was named a Ontario University Athletics second-team All-Star for the 2022 season.

== Professional career ==
Fair was selected by the Calgary Stampeders in the sixth round, with the 51st overall pick, of the 2023 CFL draft. He officially signed with the team on May 4. He was released on June 3, 2023.

Fair was signed to the practice roster of the Saskatchewan Roughriders on July 10, 2023. He was released on August 2, 2023, and then returned to Ottawa for his final season of U Sports eligibility. Fair played in eight games for the Gee-Gees during the 2023 U Sports football season.

Fair signed with the Stampeders again on November 20, 2023. He was released on June 2, 2024.

Fair was signed to the Edmonton Elks' practice roster on September 14, 2024. He was released on October 13, and later signed with the Elks again on December 6, 2024. He was released by Edmonton on May 28, 2025.

Fair was signed to the Roughriders' practice roster on August 20, 2025, after a poor game by Brett Lauther. After Lauther suffered an injury, Fair made his CFL debut on October 3, 2025, and attempted two extra points. He was moved back to the practice roster on October 9, and was released on October 12, 2025.
