= Dontae Bull =

Canadian gridiron football player (born 1999)

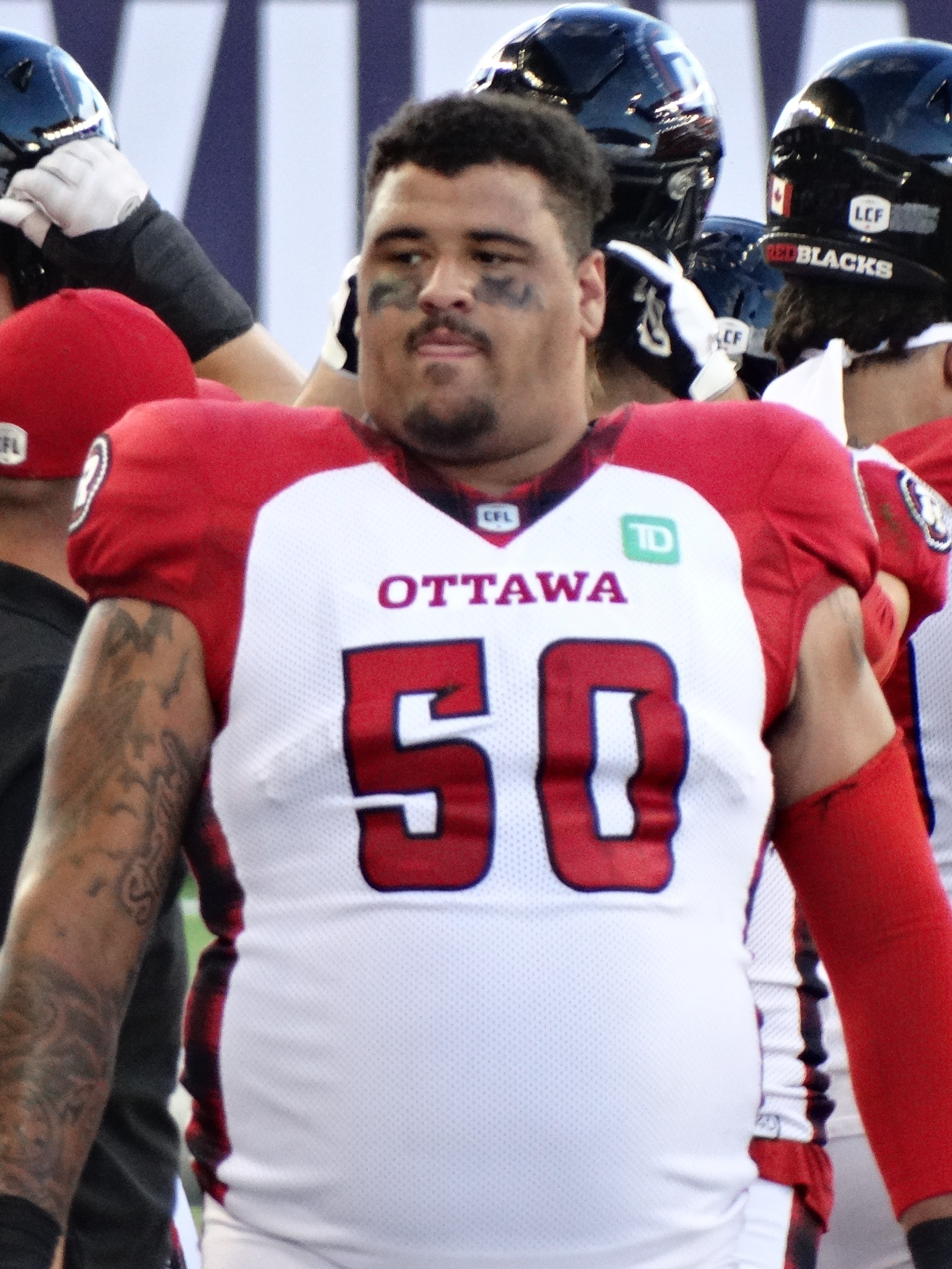
- Bull with the Ottawa Redblacks in 2023

Profile
- Position: Offensive lineman

Personal information
- Born: May 15, 1999 (age 27); Victoria, British Columbia, Canada
- Listed height: 6 ft 7 in (2.01 m)
- Listed weight: 326 lb (148 kg)

Career information
- High school: Belmont Secondary (Langford, BC)
- College: Fresno State
- CFL draft: 2023: 1st round, 1st overall pick

Career history
- 2023–2024: Ottawa Redblacks
- Stats at CFL.ca

Dontae Bull (born May 15, 1999) is a Canadian former professional football offensive lineman who played two seasons for the Ottawa Redblacks of the Canadian Football League (CFL). He was the first overall pick in the 2023 CFL draft.

== College career ==
After using a redshirt year in 2017, Bull played college football for the Fresno State Bulldogs from 2018 to 2022. He played in 37 games for the Bulldogs, starting in 33, over the course of his tenure with the team.

== Professional career ==
Bull was ranked as the seventh best player in the Canadian Football League's Amateur Scouting Bureau final rankings for players eligible in the 2023 CFL draft. He was then drafted with the first overall pick by the Ottawa Redblacks. After beginning the 2023 season on the injured list, he made his professional debut on August 13, 2023, against the Toronto Argonauts. He earned his first career start one week later for the August 19 game against the Montreal Alouettes. He dressed in nine regular season games in his rookie year.

In 2024, Bull dressed in seven regular season games. He also dressed in his first career post-season game, in the team's East Semi-Final loss to the Toronto Argonauts. On May 9, 2025, just before the open of training camp for the 2025 season, Bull was placed on the retired list.
