= Lwal Uguak =

Canadian gridiron football player (born 2000)

- Uguak with the Montreal Alouettes in 2026

No. 96 – Montreal Alouettes
- Position: Defensive lineman
- Roster status: Active
- CFL status: National

Personal information
- Born: March 30, 2000 (age 26); Edmonton, Alberta, Canada
- Listed height: 6 ft 4 in (1.93 m)
- Listed weight: 261 lb (118 kg)

Career information
- High school: Harry Ainlay
- College: Texas Christian; Connecticut
- CFL draft: 2023: 1st round, 7th overall pick

Career history
- Montreal Alouettes (2023); Tampa Bay Buccaneers (2024)*; Montreal Alouettes (2024–present)
- * Offseason or practice squad member only

Awards and highlights
- Grey Cup champion (2023)
- Stats at CFL.ca

Lwal Uguak (born March 30, 2000) is a Canadian professional football defensive end for the Montreal Alouettes of the Canadian Football League (CFL).

== College career ==
Uguak first played college football for the UConn Huskies from 2018 to 2021, but did not play in 2020 due to the program not operating during the COVID-19 pandemic. He played in 34 games where he recorded 69 total tackles, four sacks, one forced fumble, and one fumble recovery. He then transferred to Texas Christian University in 2022 to play for the TCU Horned Frogs where he played in 14 games and had ten total tackles and a fumble recovery.

== Professional career ==
Pre-draft measurables
Height	Weight	Arm length	Hand span	Wingspan	40-yard dash	10-yard split	20-yard split	20-yard shuttle	Three-cone drill	Vertical jump	Broad jump	Bench press
6 ft 3 3/4 in (1.92 m)	261 lb (118 kg)	33 5/8 in (0.85 m)	10 3/8 in (0.26 m)	6 ft 9 1/2 in (2.07 m)	4.98 s	1.75 s	2.87 s	4.67 s	7.70 s	29.0 in (0.74 m)	9 ft 8 in (2.95 m)	18 reps
All values from Pro Day

=== Montreal Alouettes (first stint) ===
Uguak was drafted in the first round, seventh overall, by the Montreal Alouettes in the 2023 CFL draft and signed with the team on May 17, 2023. He made the team's opening day roster and played in his first professional game on June 10, 2023, against the Ottawa Redblacks. As his play progressed during the year, he earned his first career start on September 23, 2023, against the Calgary Stampeders, and he continued to be the starter for the final five games of the regular season. He played in all 18 regular season games where he recorded 16 defensive tackles, three sacks, one forced fumble, and five pass knockdowns.

=== Tampa Bay Buccaneers ===
On January 30, 2024, Uguak signed a reserve/future contract with the Tampa Bay Buccaneers of the NFL. He was waived on August 27.

=== Montreal Alouettes (second stint) ===
On September 18, 2024, Uguak re-signed with the Alouettes.

== Personal life ==
Uguak's family emigrated from Sudan in 1997 and he was born in Edmonton on March 20, 2000. He is the middle child of four siblings and is the brother of Aher Uguak, a professional basketball player.
