= Charlie Ringland =

Canadian football player (born 2000)

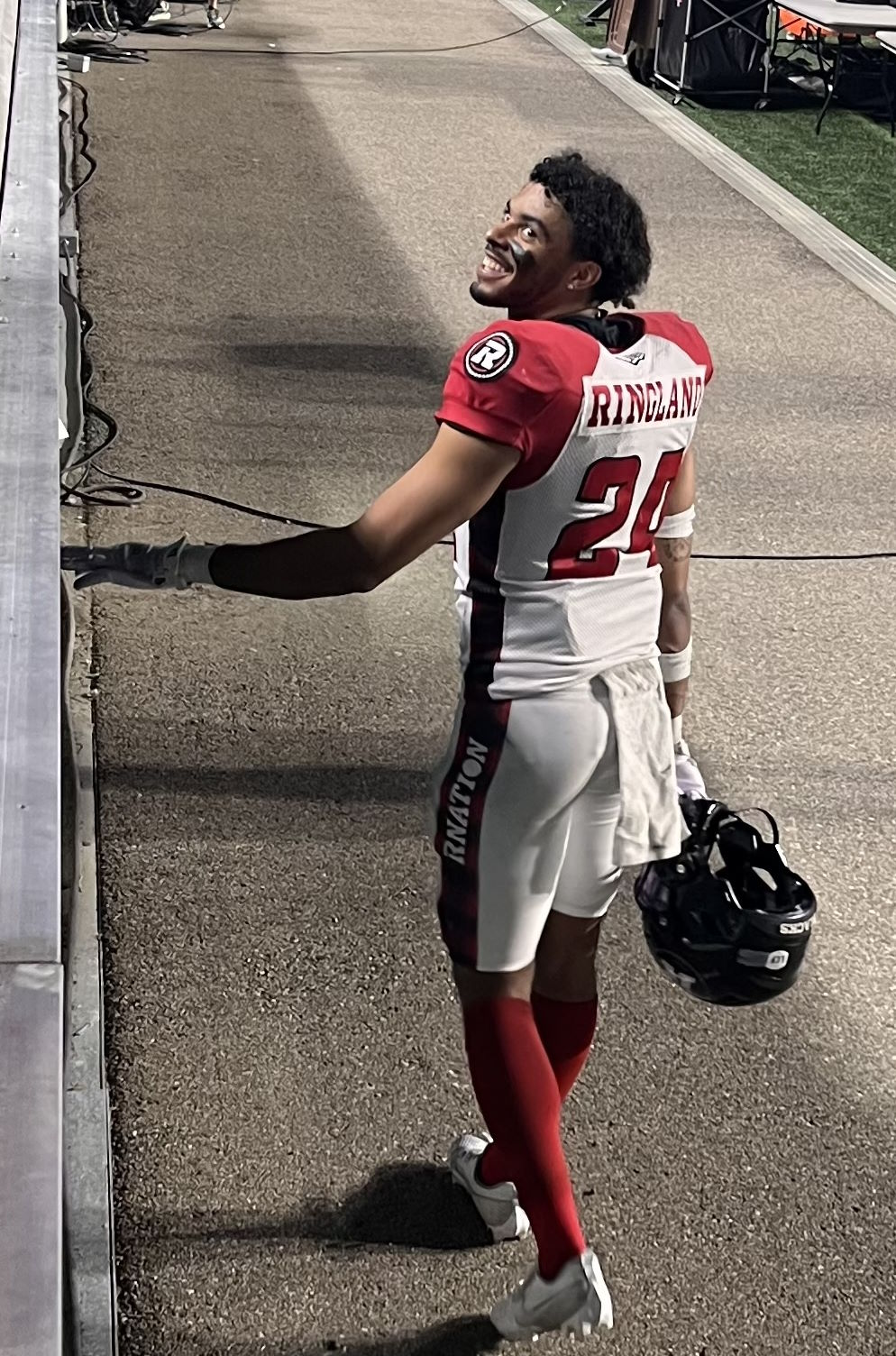
- Ringland with the Ottawa Redblacks in 2025

Profile
- Position: Defensive back

Personal information
- Born: January 18, 2000 (age 26); Winnipeg, Manitoba, Canada
- Listed height: 6 ft 1 in (1.85 m)
- Listed weight: 185 lb (84 kg)

Career information
- High school: Oak Park (Winnipeg)
- University: University of Saskatchewan (2018–2023)
- CFL draft: 2023: 5th round, 43rd overall pick

Career history
- 2024: BC Lions
- 2025: Ottawa Redblacks
- Stats at CFL.ca

Charlie Ringland (born January 18, 2000) is a Canadian professional football defensive back.

== Early life ==
Ringland was born in Winnipeg, Manitoba, and developed as a standout multi-sport athlete at the AAA level in hockey, football, and baseball. He attended Oak Park High School, where he joined both the hockey and football teams in his sophomore year.

In his first season of high school hockey, he scored the game-winning goal of the team's 2016 WHSHL city championship victory and was named Oak Park's Junior Varsity Athlete of the Year for 2015-16. He went on to serve as team captain in his senior year and was recognized as Oak Park Hockey MVP for 2017-18.

Concurrently, Ringland played football as a two-way starter, taking on roles as quarterback, free safety, and occasional kick returner. In the final game of his senior year, he threw for three touchdowns to lead the Oak Park Raiders to the 2017 WHSFL CTV Cup championship, and was named the school's Varsity Athlete of the Year for 2017-18.

== University career ==
Ringland played U Sports football with the University of Saskatchewan Huskies from 2018 to 2023. He made an immediate impact as a rookie, starting every game at free safety and earning Huskie Football Rookie of the Year honors in 2018.

Despite the cancellation of the 2020 U Sports football season, he remained a key contributor to three Canada West Hardy Cup wins and two Vanier Cup championship appearances.

In 2022, he was named a Canada West All-Star and to the U Sports All-Canadian Team.

== Professional career ==
Pre-draft measurables
Height	Weight	40-yard dash	20-yard shuttle	Three-cone drill	Vertical jump	Broad jump	Bench press
6 ft 0 3/4 in (1.85 m)	200 lb (91 kg)	4.59 s	4.18 s	7.20 s	40.0 in (1.02 m)	10 ft 5 1/4 in (3.18 m)	7 reps
All values from CFL Combine

Ringland was selected by the BC Lions with the 43rd overall pick in the fifth round of the 2023 CFL draft, but missed the 2023 season to rehab a torn ACL suffered at the CFL Combine.

He returned in 2024 and made his professional debut on August 18 in a game against the Winnipeg Blue Bombers. He went on to appear in nine games during the season.

In May 2025 he was released by the BC Lions and then immediately signed by the Ottawa Redblacks. He made his first professional start at safety with Ottawa on June 13, 2025, against the Montreal Alouettes

On April 30, 2026, Ringland was released by the Redblacks.
