= Clark Barnes (Canadian football) =

Canadian gridiron football player (born 2000)

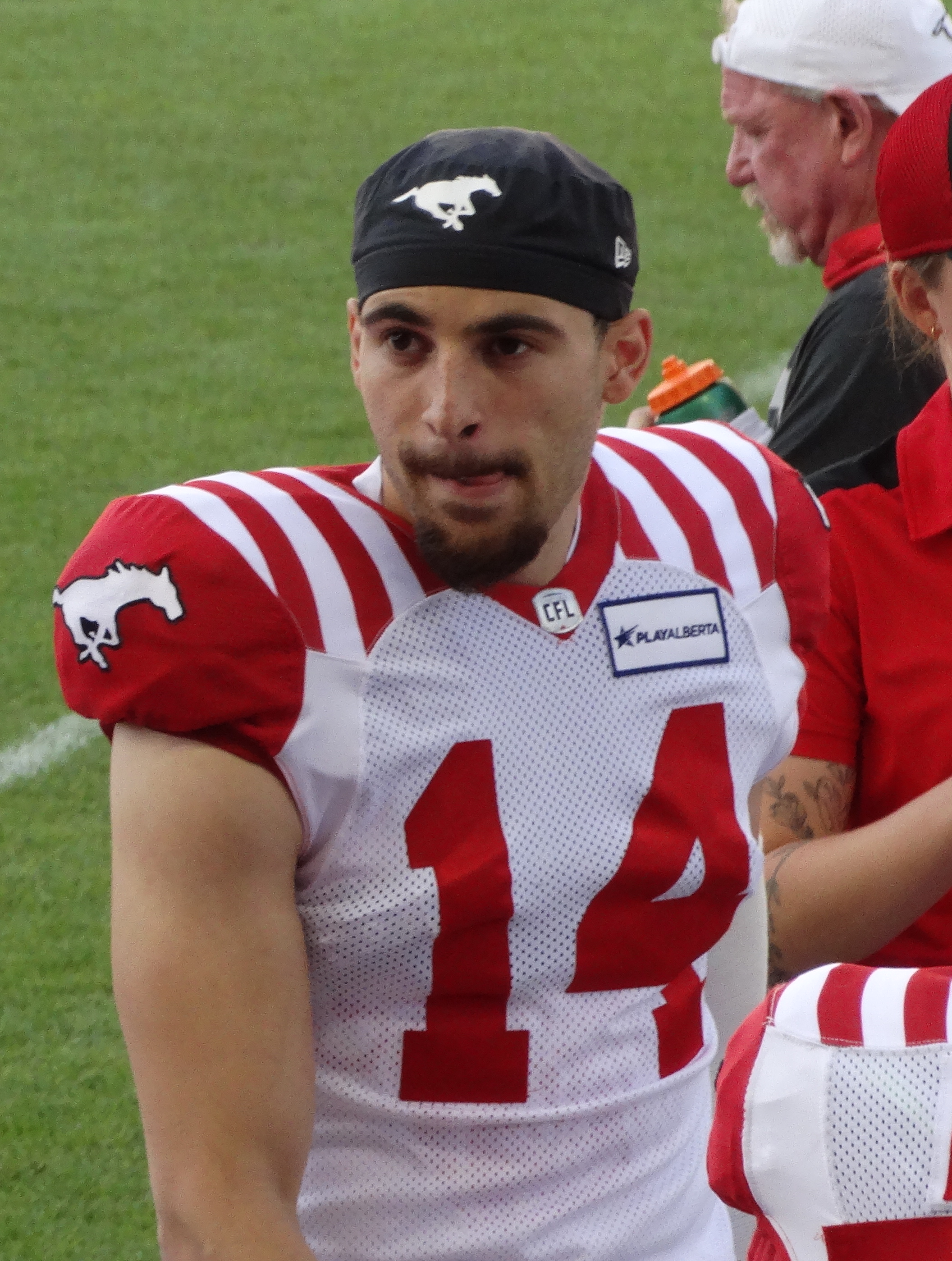
- Barnes with the Calgary Stampeders in 2024

No. 14 – Calgary Stampeders
- Position: Wide receiver
- Roster status: Active
- CFL status: National

Personal information
- Born: September 3, 2000 (age 26); Brampton, Ontario, Canada
- Listed height: 6 ft 1 in (1.85 m)
- Listed weight: 201 lb (91 kg)

Career information
- High school: Clarkson (Mississauga, ON)
- University: Guelph
- CFL draft: 2023: 3rd round, 24th overall pick

Career history
- 2023–present: Calgary Stampeders

Career CFL statistics as of 2026
- Games played: 56
- Receptions: 153
- Receiving yards: 2,177
- Receiving touchdowns: 12
- Stats at CFL.ca

Clark Barnes (born September 3, 2000) is a Canadian professional football wide receiver for the Calgary Stampeders of the Canadian Football League (CFL). He played U Sports football at Guelph.

== Early life ==
Barnes first played high school football at Clarkson Secondary School in Mississauga.

== University career ==
Barnes played U Sports football at Guelph from 2019 to 2022. The 2020 season was cancelled due to the COVID-19 pandemic.

== Professional career ==
Pre-draft measurables
Height	Weight	40-yard dash	20-yard shuttle	Three-cone drill	Vertical jump	Broad jump	Bench press
6 ft 0 5/8 in (1.84 m)	198 lb (90 kg)	4.53 s	4.46 s	7.13 s	39.0 in (0.99 m)	10 ft 4 3/8 in (3.16 m)	10 reps
All values from CFL Combine

Barnes was selected by the Calgary Stampeders of the Canadian Football League (CFL) in the third round, with the 24th overall pick, of the 2023 CFL draft. He signed with the team on May 5, 2023. He played in nine games, all starts, in 2023, catching 25 passes for 234 yards and one touchdown before being placed on injured reserve on August 15, 2023. Barnes also returned 18 kickoffs for 379 yards and two missed field goals for 111 yards.
