= Francis Bemiy =

Canadian gridiron football player (born 1999)

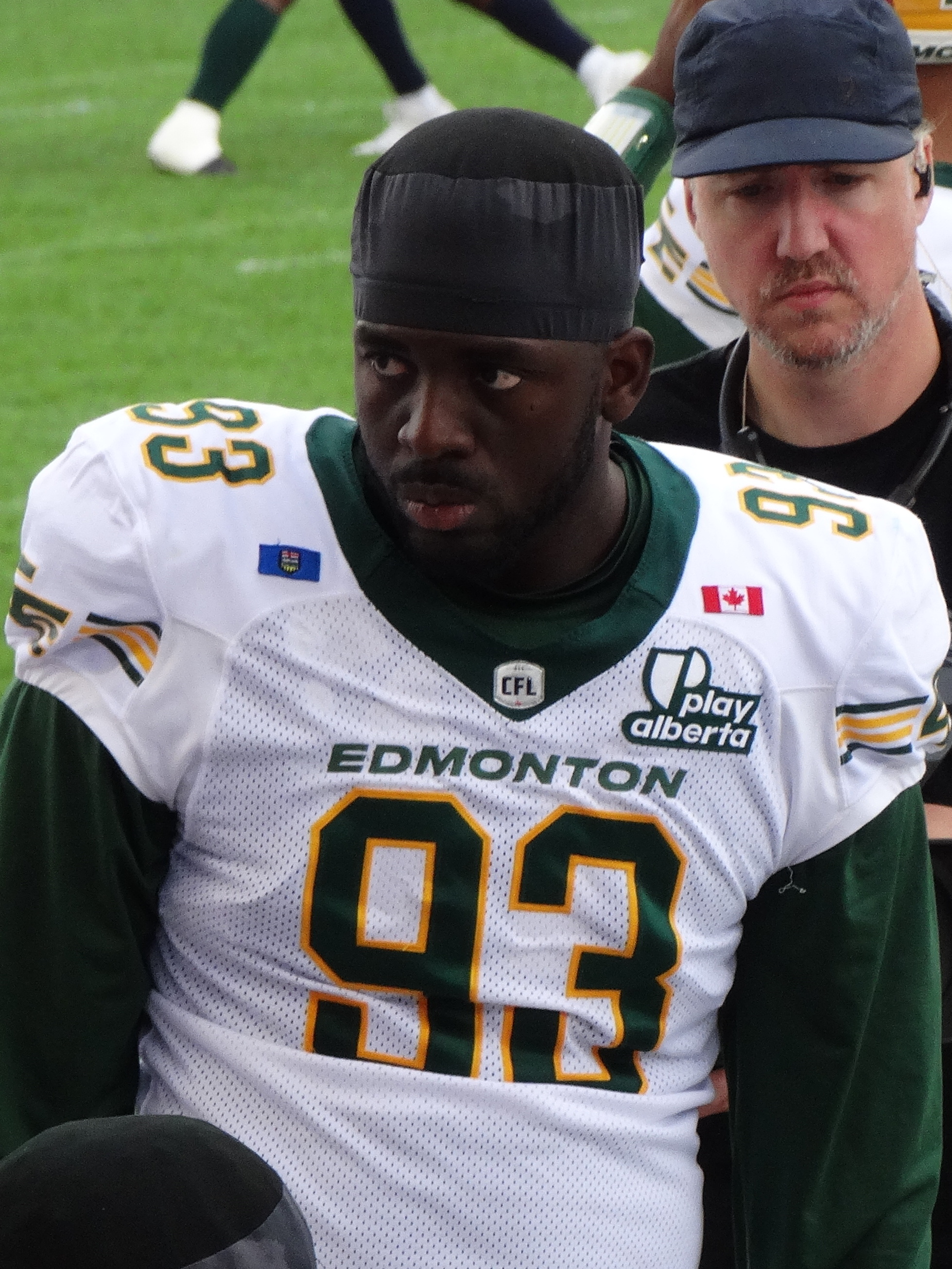
- Bemiy with the Edmonton Elks in 2025

No. 93 – Edmonton Elks
- Position: Defensive lineman
- Roster status: Practice roster
- CFL status: National

Personal information
- Born: March 16, 1999 (age 27); Montreal, Quebec, Canada
- Listed height: 6 ft 3 in (1.91 m)
- Listed weight: 253 lb (115 kg)

Career information
- High school: Carnegie (Riverside, CA)
- College: Southern Utah
- CFL draft: 2023: 1st round, 9th overall pick

Career history
- 2023–2024: BC Lions
- 2025–present: Edmonton Elks

Awards and highlights
- Grey Cup champion (2026); First-team All-Big Sky (2020)
- Stats at CFL.ca

Francis Bemiy Jr. (born March 16, 1999) is a Canadian professional football defensive lineman for the Edmonton Elks of the Canadian Football League (CFL). He played college football at Southern Utah.

== Early life ==
Bemiy first played high school football at Dorval-Jean-XXIII on the Island of Montreal before transferring to Carnegie Schools Riverside in Riverside, California. He also participated in basketball and track and field in high school.

== College career ==
Bemiy played college football at Southern Utah from 2018 to 2022. He played in 10 games in 2018, recording 13 tackles. He appeared in 11 games in 2019, totaling 51 tackles, two sacks and one forced fumble. The 2020 season was moved to spring 2021 due to the COVID-19 pandemic. Bemiy played in all six games during the spring 2021 season, accumulating 25 tackles and four sacks, earning first team All-Big Sky Conference honors. He appeared in 11 games during the fall 2021 season, recording 48 tackles, four sacks, one forced fumble and one fumble recovery. He played in 11 games in 2022, totaling 26 tackles and three sacks.

== Professional career ==
Pre-draft measurables
| Height | Weight | Arm length | Hand span | Wingspan | 40-yard dash | 10-yard split | 20-yard split | 20-yard shuttle | Three-cone drill | Vertical jump | Broad jump | Bench press |
|---|---|---|---|---|---|---|---|---|---|---|---|---|
| 6 ft 3 3/8 in (1.91 m) | 253 lb (115 kg) | 35 1/8 in (0.89 m) | 9 1/4 in (0.23 m) | 6 ft 9 1/4 in (2.06 m) | 5.03 s | 1.78 s | 2.94 s | 4.44 s | 7.39 s | 33.0 in (0.84 m) | 9 ft 9 3/4 in (2.99 m) | 13 reps |
All values from Pro Day/CFL Combine

=== BC Lions ===
Bemiy was selected by the BC Lions of the Canadian Football League (CFL) in the first round, with the ninth overall pick, of the 2023 CFL draft. He signed with the team on May 31, 2023. He spent a portion of the 2023 season injured reserve. Overall, he dressed in nine games in 2023, recording five tackles on defense. He was released on May 14, 2025.

=== Edmonton Elks ===
On May 19, 2025, it was announced that Bemiy had signed with the Edmonton Elks.
