= Tanner Schmekel =

Canadian gridiron football player (born 1999)

- Schmekel with the Winnipeg Blue Bombers in 2026

No. 96 – Winnipeg Blue Bombers
- Position: Defensive tackle
- Roster status: Active
- CFL status: National

Personal information
- Born: July 22, 1999 (age 27); Regina, Saskatchewan, Canada
- Listed height: 6 ft 1 in (1.85 m)
- Listed weight: 290 lb (132 kg)

Career information
- High school: Riffel (Regina, SK)
- CJFL: Regina Thunder
- University: Regina
- CFL draft: 2023: 4th round, 35th overall pick

Career history
- Winnipeg Blue Bombers (2023–present)

Awards and highlights
- First-team All-Canadian (2022); Canada West All-Star (2022)
- Stats at CFL.ca

Tanner Schmekel (born July 22, 1999) is a Canadian professional football defensive tackle for the Winnipeg Blue Bombers of the Canadian Football League (CFL). He played U Sports football at Regina.

== Early life ==
Schmekel attended Michael A. Riffel High School in Regina, Saskatchewan. He was part of the Canada team that won the 2018 IFAF U-19 World Championship.

== University and junior career ==
Schmekel played U Sports football for the Regina Rams from 2017 to 2022. He was redshirted in 2017 after dressing in just one game. He dressed in eight games, all starts, in 2018, recording 23 tackles. Schmekel did not play for the Rams in 2019 and instead played for the Regina Thunder of the Canadian Junior Football League. He returned to the Rams in 2020 but the season ended up being cancelled due to the COVID-19 pandemic. He dressed in six games, all starts, for the Rams during the 2021 season, totaling 13 tackles and one sack. Schmekel started eight games in 2022, accumulating 22 tackles, two sacks, and one pass breakup, earning first-team All-Canadian and Canada West All-Star honors.

== Professional career ==
Pre-draft measurables
Height	Weight	40-yard dash	20-yard shuttle	Vertical jump	Broad jump	Bench press
6 ft 1 1/8 in (1.86 m)	290 lb (132 kg)	5.30 s	4.77 s	28.5 in (0.72 m)	8 ft 10 1/2 in (2.71 m)	21 reps
All values from CFL Combine

Schmekel was selected by the Winnipeg Blue Bombers of the Canadian Football League (CFL) in the fourth round, with the 35th overall pick, of the 2023 CFL draft. He officially signed with the team on May 8. He was moved between the practice roster and active roster several times during the 2023 season. Overall, he dressed in five games, recording one defensive tackle and one sack, in 2023.
