= Max Charbonneau =

Canadian gridiron football player (born 1999)

Profile
- Position: Linebacker

Personal information
- Born: August 19, 1999 (age 27); Ottawa, Ontario
- Listed height: 6 ft 3 in (1.91 m)
- Listed weight: 225 lb (102 kg)

Career information
- University: Ottawa
- CFL draft: 2023: 8th round, 71st overall pick

Career history
- 2023: Winnipeg Blue Bombers*
- 2024: Winnipeg Blue Bombers
- * Offseason or practice squad member only

Awards and highlights
- Second-team All-Canadian (2023); President Award winner 2023 (defensive player of the year OUA)
- Stats at CFL.ca

Max Charbonneau (born August 19, 1999) is a Canadian professional football linebacker. He most recently played for the Winnipeg Blue Bombers of the Canadian Football League (CFL).

== University career ==
Charbonneau played U Sports football for the Ottawa Gee-Gees from 2018 to 2023. He played in 36 games over five seasons with the team where he had 115.5 total tackles, 4.5 tackles for a loss, one forced fumble, and one fumble recovery. He was named a Second-team All-Canadian in his final season, in 2023.

== Professional career ==
Pre-draft measurables
Height	Weight	40-yard dash	20-yard shuttle	Three-cone drill	Vertical jump	Broad jump	Bench press
6 ft 2 1/8 in (1.88 m)	224 lb (102 kg)	4.85 s	4.43 s	7.46 s	34.5 in (0.88 m)	9 ft 4 1/2 in (2.86 m)	13 reps
All values from CFL Combine

Charbonneau was drafted in the eighth round, 71st overall by the Winnipeg Blue Bombers in the 2023 CFL draft and signed with the team on May 5, 2023. He attended training camp with the team, but returned to the Gee-Gees to finish his U Sports eligibility. He then re-signed with the Blue Bombers on November 28, 2023.

Following training camp in 2024, Charbonneau made the team's active roster and had his professional debut on June 7, 2024, against the Montreal Alouettes. He played in 12 regular season games where he had seven special teams tackles. He did not play in the West Final, but he made his post-season debut in the 111th Grey Cup where the Blue Bombers lost to the Toronto Argonauts. He was released in the following offseason on April 22, 2025 due to a career ending injury.
