= Jake Taylor (Canadian football) =

Canadian gridiron football player (born 2001)

No. 23 – Calgary Stampeders
- Positions: Linebacker, Defensive back
- Roster status: Practice roster
- CFL status: National

Personal information
- Born: December 1, 2001 (age 24); Beaumont, Alberta, Canada
- Listed height: 6 ft 1 in (1.85 m)
- Listed weight: 215 lb (98 kg)

Career information
- High school: Salisbury Composite High
- University: Alberta (2019–2022)
- CFL draft: 2023: 2nd round, 18th overall pick

Career history
- Edmonton Elks (2023–2024); Calgary Stampeders (2026–present)

Career CFL statistics as of 2026
- Games played: 22
- Tackles: 15
- Stats at CFL.ca

Jacob Taylor (born December 1, 2001) is a Canadian professional football linebacker and defensive back for the Calgary Stampeders of the Canadian Football League (CFL). He played U Sports football for the Alberta Golden Bears.

== University career ==
Taylor played U Sports football for the Alberta Golden Bears from 2019 to 2022. He played in 21 games where he had 60 solo tackles, 17 assisted tackles, one sack, one interception, and three fumble recoveries.

== Professional career ==
=== Edmonton Elks ===
Taylor was drafted in the second round, 18th overall, by the Edmonton Elks in the 2023 CFL draft and signed with the team on May 8, 2023. Following training camp in 2023, he made the team's active roster and made his professional debut on June 11, 2023, against the Saskatchewan Roughriders where he recorded two special teams tackles. He played in 17 regular season games in his rookie year where he recorded one defensive tackles and eight special teams tackles.

In 2024, Taylor played in just five regular season games, as he began the season on the injured list and also spent time on the practice roster. He recorded three defensive tackles and two special teams tackles. Taylor was released on May 2, 2025.

=== Calgary Stampeders ===
On September 18, 2026, Taylor signed to the practice roster of the Calgary Stampeders.
