= Jesulayomi Ojutalayo =

Canadian gridiron football player (born 2003)

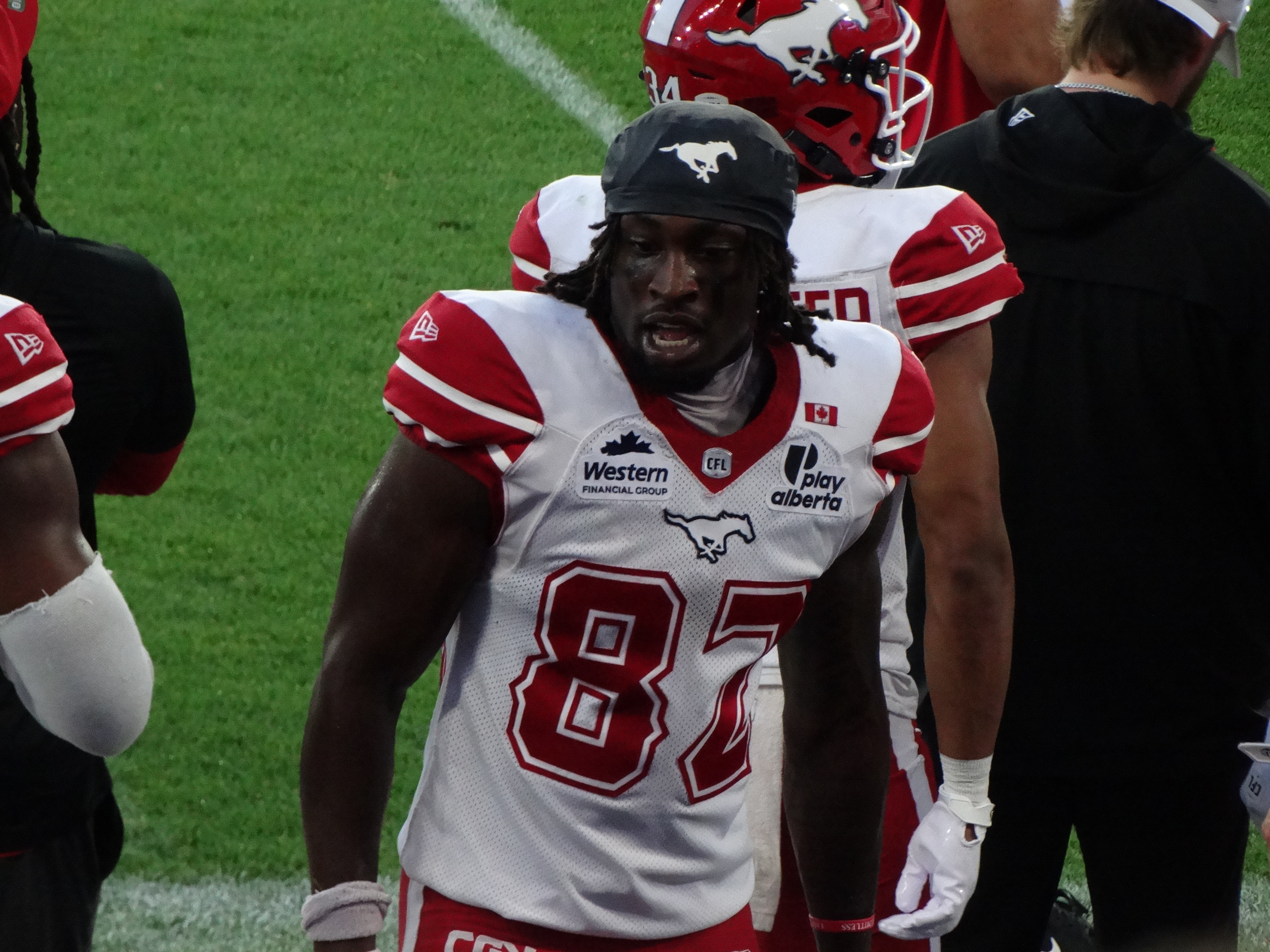
- Ojutalayo with the Calgary Stampeders in 2026

No. 82 – Calgary Stampeders
- Position: Wide receiver
- Roster status: Active
- CFL status: National

Personal information
- Born: July 2, 2003 (age 23); Shelburne, Ontario, Canada
- Listed height: 6 ft 2 in (1.88 m)
- Listed weight: 212 lb (96 kg)

Career information
- High school: Robert F. Hall (Caledon East, Ontario)
- University: Wilfrid Laurier (2023–2025)
- CFL draft: 2026: 3rd round, 26th overall pick

Career history
- Calgary Stampeders (2026–present)

Awards and highlights
- OUA First-team All-Star (2025); Yates Cup champion (2024)
- Stats at CFL.ca

Jesulayomi Ojutalayo (born July 2, 2003) is a Canadian professional football wide receiver for the Calgary Stampeders of the Canadian Football League (CFL). He played U Sports football for the Wilfrid Laurier Golden Hawks.

== U Sports career ==
Ojutalayo played U Sports football for the Wilfrid Laurier Golden Hawks from 2023 to 2025. He played in 21 games, recording 44 receptions for 705 yards and six touchdowns. Ojutalayo also rushed three times for 32 yards and played on special teams, registering 26 total tackles. In his final year, he was named a OUA first-team All-star as Rush/Cover.

== Professional career ==
Pre-draft measurables
Height	Weight	40-yard dash	20-yard shuttle	Three-cone drill	Vertical jump	Broad jump	Bench press
6 ft 1 7/8 in (1.88 m)	217 lb (98 kg)	4.58 s	4.25 s	6.97 s	38 in (0.97 m)	10 ft 7 7/8 in (3.25 m)	14 reps
All values from CFL Combine

Ojutalayo was selected by the Calgary Stampeders with the 26th pick in the third round of the 2026 CFL draft. He placed in the top five of four of six drills at the CFL Combine, including a tie for first place in the vertical jump. Ojutalayo was officially signed to the team on May 2, 2026.
