= 2023 CFL draft =

Canadian football draft

General information
- Sport: Canadian football
- Date: May 2, 2023
- Time: 8:00 pm EDT
- Location: Toronto
- Network: TSN

Overview
- 72 total selections in 8 rounds
- League: CFL
- Territorial pick: 2
- First selection: Dontae Bull, Ottawa Redblacks
- Most selections (10): Ottawa Redblacks
- Fewest selections (6): Hamilton Tiger-Cats
- U Sports selections: 57
- NCAA selections: 14

The 2023 CFL national draft was a selection of national players by Canadian Football League teams that took place on May 2, 2023, at 8:00 pm ET. 72 players were chosen from among eligible players from Canadian Universities across the country, as well as Canadian players playing in the NCAA and NAIA.

The draft was broadcast live on TSN for the first two rounds with subsequent rounds being streamed online. The TSN production was hosted by Farhan Lalji and featured the CFL on TSN panel, including Duane Forde, Marshall Ferguson, Jim Barker, and Dave Naylor.

== Combines ==
For the first time the CFL held an invitational players combine at the University of Waterloo's Feridun Hamdullahpur Field House on March 3, 2023. The main combine took place March 22-26, 2023, at the Commonwealth Stadium Field House in Edmonton, AB.

== Top prospects ==
Source: CFL Scouting Bureau rankings.

Final ranking	January ranking	September ranking	Player	Position	University	Hometown
1	5	–	Matthew Bergeron	Offensive Lineman	Syracuse	Victoriaville, QC
2	1	1	Chase Brown	Running back	Illinois	London, ON
3	2	3	Sydney Brown	Defensive back	Illinois	London, ON
4	3	9	Tavius Robinson	Defensive lineman	Mississippi	Guelph, ON
5	4	7	Sidy Sow	Offensive lineman	Eastern Michigan	Bromont, QC
6	6	4	Jared Wayne	Wide receiver	Pittsburgh	Peterborough, ON
7	7	2	Dontae Bull	Offensive lineman	Fresno State	Victoria, BC
8	9	10	Jonathan Sutherland	Linebacker	Penn State	Ottawa, ON
9	8	6	Lwal Uguak	Defensive lineman	Texas Christian	Edmonton, AB
10	12	11	Francis Bemiy	Defensive lineman	Southern Utah	Montreal, QC
11	15	–	Michael Brodrique	Linebacker	Montreal	Sainte-Marthe-sur-le-Lac, QC
12	–	–	Cole Tucker	Wide receiver	Northern Illinois	DeKalb, IL
13	10	20	Lake Korte-Moore	Defensive lineman	British Columbia	Ottawa, ON
14	14	13	Clark Barnes	Wide receiver	Guelph	Brampton, ON
15	11	16	Siriman Bagayogo	Defensive back	Guelph	Bois-des-Filion, QC
16	13	–	Anthony Bennett	Defensive lineman	Regina	Weston, FL
17	20	–	Phillip Grohovac	Offensive lineman	Western	Victoria, BC
18	18	18	Jacob Taylor	Linebacker	Alberta	Beaumont, AB
19	16	–	James Peter	Linebacker	Ottawa	Ottawa, ON
20	–	–	Dayton Black	Offensive lineman	Saskatchewan	Brandon, MB
–	17	19	Reece Martin	Defensive lineman	Mount Allison	Moncton, NB
–	19	–	Quintin Seguin	Defensive lineman	Charleston Southern	Windsor, ON
–	–	5	Nick Mardner	Wide receiver	Cincinnati	Mississauga, ON
–	–	8	Theo Benedet	Offensive lineman	British Columbia	North Vancouver, BC
–	–	12	Gabe Wallace	Offensive lineman	Buffalo	Salmon Arm, BC
–	–	14	Daniel Johnson	Offensive lineman	Purdue	London, ON
–	–	15	Giovanni Manu	Offensive lineman	British Columbia	Pitt Meadows, BC
–	–	17	Justin Sambu	Defensive lineman	Maine	Calgary, AB

== Draft order ==
=== Round one ===
Pick #	CFL team	Player	Position	University
1	Ottawa Redblacks	Dontae Bull	OL	Fresno State
2	Edmonton Elks	Michael Brodrique	LB	Montreal
3	Saskatchewan Roughriders	Lake Korte-Moore	DL	British Columbia
4	Calgary Stampeders (via Hamilton)	Cole Tucker	WR	Northern Illinois
5	Montreal Alouettes	Jonathan Sutherland	LB	Penn State
6	Hamilton Tiger-Cats (via Calgary)	Dayton Black	OL	Saskatchewan
7	Montreal Alouettes (via BC)	Lwal Uguak	DL	Texas Christian
8	Winnipeg Blue Bombers	Anthony Bennett	DL	Regina
9	BC Lions (via Toronto)	Francis Bemiy	DL	Southern Utah

=== Round two ===
Pick #	CFL team	Player	Position	University
10	Ottawa Redblacks	Lucas Cormier	DB	Mount Allison
–	Edmonton Elks	Selection forfeited		
11	Saskatchewan Roughriders	Jaxon Ford	DB	Regina
12	Ottawa Redblacks (via Edmonton via Hamilton)	James Peter	LB	Ottawa
13	Montreal Alouettes	David Dallaire	FB	Laval
–	Calgary Stampeders	Selection forfeited		
14	BC Lions	Siriman Bagayogo	DB	Guelph
15	Winnipeg Blue Bombers	Jake Kelly	DB	Bishop's
16	Toronto Argonauts	Jared Wayne	WR	Pittsburgh
17T	Ottawa Redblacks	Daniel Oladejo	WR	Ottawa
18T	Edmonton Elks	Jacob Taylor	LB	Alberta

=== Round three ===
Pick #	CFL team	Player	Position	University
19	Ottawa Redblacks	Aidan John	DL	St. Mary's
20	Edmonton Elks	Phillip Grohovac	OL	Western Ontario
21	Saskatchewan Roughriders	Matt Dean	LB	York
22	Calgary Stampeders (via Hamilton)	Kwadwo Boahen	DL	Alberta
23	Edmonton Elks (via Montreal)	Luke Burton-Krahn	DB	British Columbia
24	Calgary Stampeders	Clark Barnes	WR	Guelph
25	Ottawa Redblacks (via BC)	Josh White	LB	Regina
26	Winnipeg Blue Bombers	Jeremy Murphy	WR	Concordia (QC)
27	Toronto Argonauts	Adam Guillemette	LS	Holy Cross

=== Round four ===
Pick #	CFL team	Player	Position	University
28	Edmonton Elks (via Ottawa)	Noah Curtis	DL	Keiser
29	Hamilton Tiger-Cats (via Edmonton )	Patrick Burke Jr.	DB	Wilfrid Laurier
30	Saskatchewan Roughriders	Thomas Bertrand-Hudon	RB	Delaware State
31	Hamilton Tiger-Cats	Reece Martin	DL	Mount Allison
32	Montreal Alouettes	Theo Grant	OL	Queen's
33	Calgary Stampeders	Alexandre Marcoux	OL	McGill
34	BC Lions	Markcus Jean-Loescher	DL	St. Mary's
35	Winnipeg Blue Bombers	Tanner Schmekel	DL	Regina
36	Toronto Argonauts	Spencer Nichols	RB	Western Ontario

=== Round five ===
Pick #	CFL team	Player	Position	University
37	Ottawa Redblacks	Daniel Perry	WR	Saskatchewan
38	Edmonton Elks	Bertrand Beaulieu	RB	Montreal
39	Montreal Alouettes (via Saskatchewan)	Jacob Mason	FB	McMaster
40	Hamilton Tiger-Cats	Robert Panabaker	DB	Western Ontario
41	Montreal Alouettes	Shedler Fervius	WR	St. Mary's
42	Calgary Stampeders	Ryan Leder	DL	McMaster
43	BC Lions	Charlie Ringland	DB	Saskatchewan
44	Winnipeg Blue Bombers	Collin Kornelson	DL	Manitoba
45	Toronto Argonauts	Edouard Paradis	OL	Houston Christian

=== Round six ===
Pick #	CFL team	Player	Position	University
46	Ottawa Redblacks	Quintin Seguin	DL	Charleston Southern
47	Toronto Argonauts (via Edmonton)	Richard Burton	WR	Queen's
48	Saskatchewan Roughriders	Sidy Sow	OL	Eastern Michigan
49	Calgary Stampeders (via Hamilton)	Sebastian Howard	TE	St. Mary's
50	Edmonton Elks (via Montreal)	Spencer Masterson	OL	Guelph
51	Calgary Stampeders	Campbell Fair	K	Ottawa
52	BC Lions	Jassin States-McClean	DB	St. Mary's
53	Winnipeg Blue Bombers	Breton MacDougall	DB	Windsor
54	Toronto Argonauts	Ife Onyemenam	LB	Wilfrid Laurier

=== Round seven ===
Pick #	CFL team	Player	Position	University
55	Ottawa Redblacks	Alexander Fedchun	DL	St. Francis Xavier
56	Edmonton Elks	Bruno Legace	DE	Montreal
57	Saskatchewan Roughriders	Evan Floren	OL	Queen's
58	Ottawa Redblacks (via Edmonton via Hamilton)	Amlicar Polk	RB	Ottawa
59	Montreal Alouettes	Chase Brown	RB	Illinois
60	Saskatchewan Roughriders (via Calgary)	Nick Thomas	LB	Manitoba
61	BC Lions	Jack Hinsperger	LB	Waterloo
62	Winnipeg Blue Bombers	Jonathan Rosery	RB	Alberta
63	Toronto Argonauts	Brendan Murphy	DB	Western Ontario

=== Round eight ===
Pick #	CFL team	Player	Position	University
64	Hamilton Tiger-Cats (via Edmonton via Ottawa)	Josh Hyer	DL	Calgary
65	Edmonton Elks	Derek Best	RB	Western Ontario
66	Saskatchewan Roughriders	Tavius Robinson	DL	Mississippi
67	Hamilton Tiger-Cats	Caleb Morin	WR	Saskatchewan
68	Montreal Alouettes	Maxym Lavallee	DB	Laval
69	Calgary Stampeders	Lucas Robertson	FB	British Columbia
70	BC Lions	Troy Kowal	OL	Minot State
71	Winnipeg Blue Bombers	Max Charbonneau	LB	Ottawa
72	Toronto Argonauts	Anthony Vandal	OL	Sherbrooke

== Trades ==
In the explanations below, (D) denotes trades that took place during the draft, while (PD) indicates trades completed pre-draft.

=== Round one ===
- Hamilton ←→ Calgary (PD). Hamilton traded this selection, a third-round pick in this draft, a sixth-round pick in this draft, and a second-round pick in the 2024 CFL draft to Calgary in exchange for Bo Levi Mitchell, a first-round pick in this draft, and a third-round pick in the 2024 CFL draft.
- BC → Montreal (PD). BC traded this selection to Montreal in exchange for Vernon Adams.
- Toronto → BC (PD). Toronto traded this selection to BC in exchange for Jordan Williams.

=== Round two ===
- Hamilton → Edmonton (PD). Hamilton traded this selection and Jesse Gibbon to Edmonton in exchange for David Beard and a conditional fourth-round pick in this year's draft.
- Edmonton → Ottawa (PD). Edmonton traded the 12th overall selection to Ottawa in exchange for the rights to Woodly Appolon.

=== Round three ===
- Montreal → Edmonton (PD). Montreal traded this selection and Avery Ellis to Edmonton in exchange for Nafees Lyon and Thomas Costigan.
- BC → Ottawa (PD). BC traded this selection and a conditional fourth-round selection in the 2024 CFL draft to Ottawa in exchange for Terry Williams.
- Hamilton → Calgary (PD). Hamilton traded this selection, a first-round pick in this draft, a sixth-round pick in this draft, and a second-round pick in the 2024 CFL draft to Calgary in exchange for Bo Levi Mitchell, a first-round pick in this draft, and a third-round pick in the 2024 CFL draft.

=== Round four ===
- Ottawa → Edmonton (PD). Ottawa traded this selection to Edmonton in exchange for Nick Arbuckle.
- Edmonton → Hamilton (PD). Edmonton traded a conditional fourth-round selection and David Beard to Hamilton in exchange for Jesse Gibbon and a second-round pick in this year's draft. The condition was confirmed to be fulfilled upon the release of the draft order by the league.

=== Round five ===
- Saskatchewan → Montreal (PD). Saskatchewan traded this selection to Montreal in exchange for Mario Alford. This selection was originally a sixth-round pick, but was upgraded after Alford played in at least nine games for the Roughriders.

=== Round six ===
- Edmonton → Toronto (PD). Edmonton traded this selection to Toronto in exchange for Jalen Collins and Martez Ivey.
- Montreal → Edmonton (PD). Montreal traded this selection to Edmonton in exchange for Walter Fletcher.
- Hamilton → Calgary (PD). Hamilton traded this selection, a first-round pick in this draft, a third-round pick in this draft, and a second-round pick in the 2024 CFL draft to Calgary in exchange for Bo Levi Mitchell, a first-round pick in this draft, and a third-round pick in the 2024 CFL draft.

=== Round seven ===
- Calgary → Saskatchewan (PD). Calgary traded this selection and a third-round selection in the 2023 CFL global draft to Saskatchewan in exchange for James Smith. This selection can be upgraded to a fifth-round selection depending on the number of games played by Smith for the Stampeders.
- Hamilton → Edmonton (PD). Hamilton traded this selection to Edmonton in exchange for Colin Kelly.
- Edmonton → Ottawa (PD). Edmonton traded this selection to Ottawa in exchange for Llevi Noel and an eighth-round pick in this year's draft.

=== Round eight ===
- Ottawa → Edmonton (PD). Ottawa traded this selection and Llevi Noel to Edmonton in exchange for a seventh-round pick in this year's draft.
- Edmonton → Hamilton (PD). Edmonton traded this selection to Hamilton in exchange for Jon Ryan.

=== Conditional trades ===
- Montreal → Calgary (PD). Montreal traded a conditional second-round selection to Calgary in exchange for the playing rights to Laurent Duvernay-Tardif. The condition would've been fulfilled if Duvernay-Tardif signed with the Alouettes before the draft, but he did not.

== Forfeitures ==
- Edmonton forfeited their second round pick after selecting J-Min Pelley in the 2022 Supplemental Draft.
- Calgary forfeited their second round pick after selecting T. J. Rayam in the 2022 Supplemental Draft.

== See also ==
- 2023 CFL global draft
