= Collin Kornelson =

Canadian gridiron football player (born 2000)

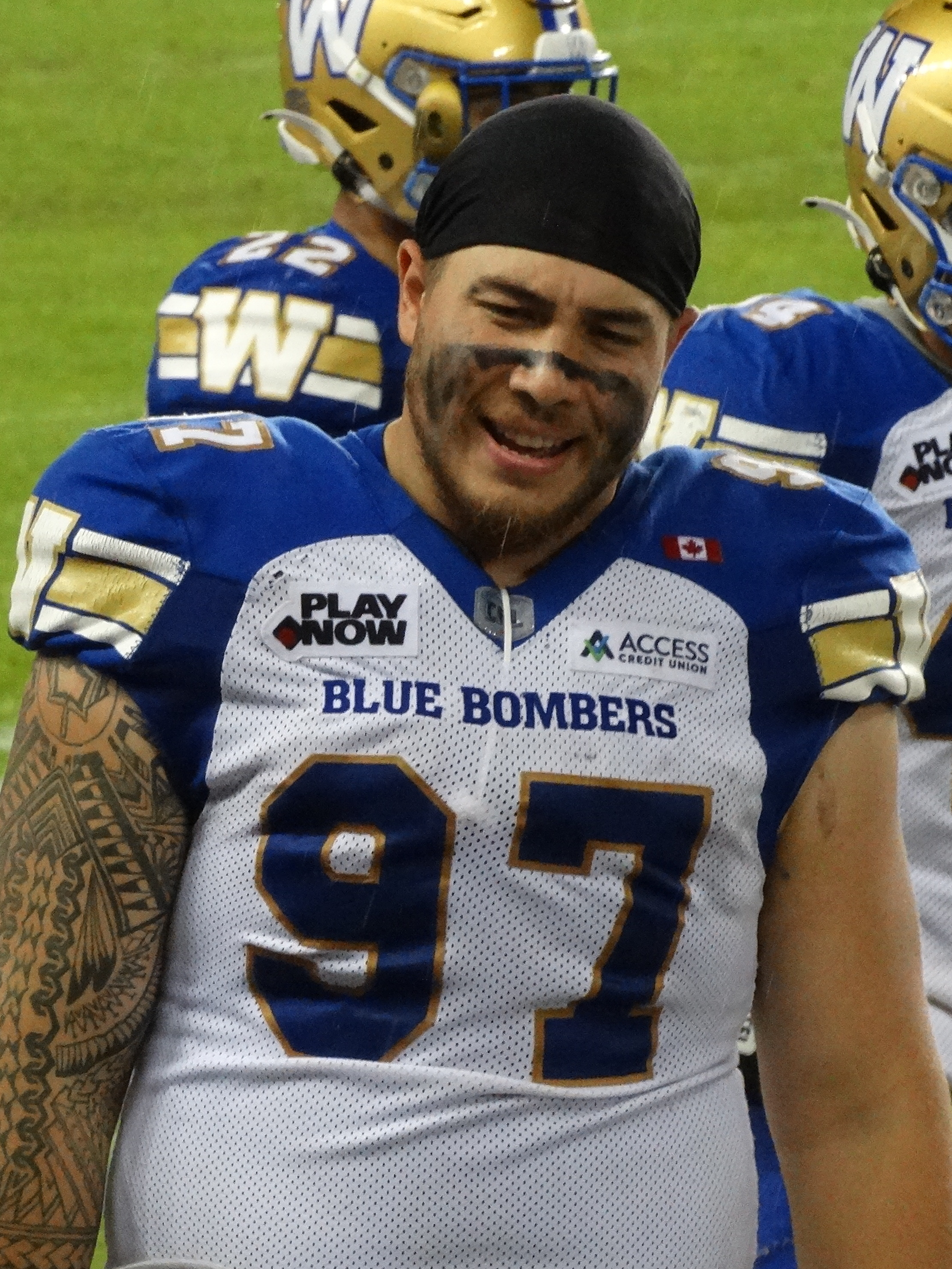
- Kornelson with the Winnipeg Blue Bombers in 2025

Calgary Stampeders
- Position: Defensive lineman
- CFL status: National

Personal information
- Born: February 14, 2000 (age 26); Winnipeg, Manitoba
- Listed height: 6 ft 2 in (1.88 m)
- Listed weight: 285 lb (129 kg)

Career information
- High school: St. Paul's (Winnipeg)
- University: Manitoba (2018–2024)
- CFL draft: 2023: 5th round, 44th overall pick

Career history
- Winnipeg Blue Bombers (2023)*; Winnipeg Blue Bombers (2024)*; Winnipeg Blue Bombers (2025–2026); Calgary Stampeders (2026–present)
- * Offseason or practice squad member only

Awards and highlights
- Second-team All-Canadian (2024)
- Stats at CFL.ca

Collin Kornelson (born February 14, 2000) is a Canadian professional football defensive lineman for the Calgary Stampeders of the Canadian Football League (CFL). He played U Sports football at Manitoba.

== Early life ==
Collin Kornelson was born on February 14, 2000. He grew up in Winnipeg. He played youth football for the Valour Patriots. Kornelson played high school football at St. Paul's High School in Winnipeg.

== University career ==
Kornelson played U Sports football for the Manitoba Bisons of the University of Manitoba. He played in one game as a true freshman in 2018 but did not record any statistics. He appeared in three games in 2019, posting three solo tackles and one assisted tackle. The 2020 U Sports football season was cancelled due to the COVID-19 pandemic. Kornelson played in eight games during the 2021 season, totaling 17 solo tackles, ten assisted tackles, one sack, and one pass breakup. He appeared in four games in 2022, posting eight solo tackles, six assisted tackles, and one sack.

Kornelson was selected by the Winnipeg Blue Bombers in the fifth round, with the 44th overall pick, of the 2023 CFL draft. He signed with the team on May 8, 2023. He was released before the start of the 2023 CFL season. He then returned to the University of Manitoba for another season of U Sports football. He only played in six games during the 2023 U Sports season due to a torn pectoral muscle, totaling 15 solo tackles, four assisted tackles, one sack, one forced fumble, and one fumble recovery. Kornelson re-signed with the Blue Bombers on November 27, 2023. He broke his foot late in training camp and was released again before the start of the 2024 CFL season. He then returned to the Bisons. He played in nine games, all starts, as a seventh-year senior in 2024, recording 20 solo tackles, 17 assisted tackles, and two sacks. Kornelson was named a second-team All-Canadian for his performance during the 2024 season.

== Professional career ==
Pre-draft measurables
Height	Weight	40-yard dash	20-yard shuttle	Three-cone drill	Vertical jump	Broad jump	Bench press
6 ft 1 7/8 in (1.88 m)	288 lb (131 kg)	5.11 s	4.45 s	7.63 s	30.0 in (0.76 m)	9 ft 1 7/8 in (2.79 m)	21 reps
All values from CFL Combine

=== Winnipeg Blue Bombers ===
Kornelson re-signed with the Blue Bombers for the third time on December 6, 2024. He dressed in six games for Winnipeg during the 2025 season and posted three tackles on defense. He was moved to the practice roster on July 30, and was released on August 20, 2025. Kornelson was re-signed by the Blue Bombers on September 3, 2025. He played in nine games in 2025 where he recorded three defensive tackles.

On May 31, 2026, Kornelson was released as part of final roster cuts but immediately signed to the team's practice roster. He played in five games in the first half of the 2026 season but was again released on August 12, 2026.

=== Calgary Stampeders ===
On September 4, 2026, it was announced that Kornelson had signed with the Calgary Stampeders.
