= 2025 Saskatchewan Roughriders season =

CFL team season

- General manager: Jeremy O'Day
- President: Craig Reynolds
- Head coach: Corey Mace
- Home stadium: Mosaic Stadium

Results
- Record: 12–6
- Division place: 1st, West
- Playoffs: Won Grey Cup
- Team MOP: Trevor Harris
- Team MODP: Jameer Thurman
- Team MOC: A. J. Allen
- Team MOOL: Jermarcus Hardrick
- Team MOST: Nick Wiebe
- Team MOR: Payton Collins

Uniform
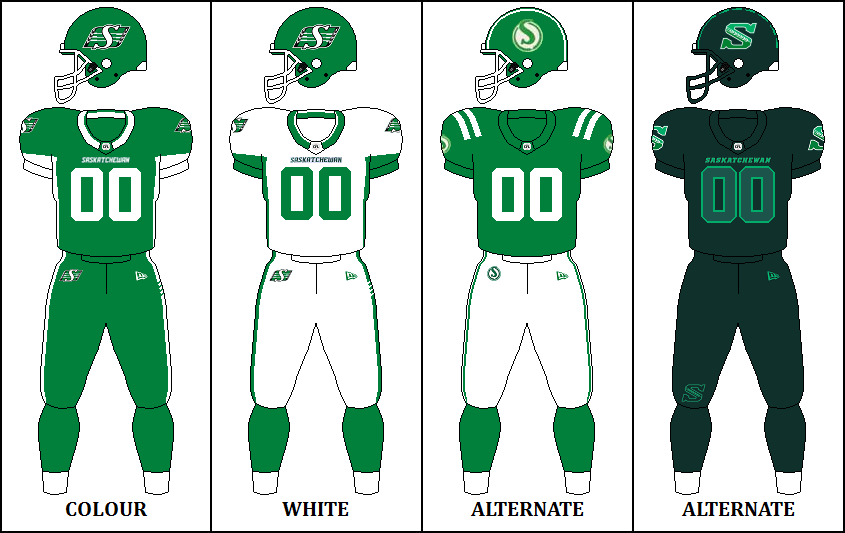

The 2025 Saskatchewan Roughriders season was the 67th season for the team in the Canadian Football League (CFL). It was the club's 116th year overall, and its 109th season of play. The Roughriders qualified for the playoffs for the second consecutive season following losses by the Winnipeg Blue Bombers and Edmonton Elks in week 15. On October 10, 2025, the Roughriders secured first place in the West Division for the ninth time in franchise history after their victory over the Toronto Argonauts and clinched the top record in the league for the fifth time. The Roughriders won their fifth Grey Cup championship, defeating the Montreal Alouettes in the championship game.

The 2025 CFL season is the second season under head coach Corey Mace and fifth season under general manager Jeremy O'Day.

The Saskatchewan Roughriders drew an average home attendance of 28,427, the 2nd-highest of all Canadian football teams in the world.

== Offseason ==
=== CFL global draft ===
The 2025 CFL global draft took place on April 29, 2025. The Roughriders had two selections in the draft, holding the sixth pick in each round.

Round	Pick	Player	Position	School	Nationality
1	6	Sylvain Yondjouen	DL	Georgia Tech	Belgium
2	15	Jesse Mirco	P	Vanderbilt	Australia

== CFL national draft ==
The 2025 CFL draft took place on April 29, 2025. The Roughriders had seven selections in the eight-round draft. Not including traded picks or forfeitures, the team selected sixth in each round of the draft after finishing fourth in the 2024 league standings.

Round	Pick	Player	Position	School	Hometown
1	4	Ali Saad	DL	Bowling Green	Windsor, ON
2	13	Erik Andersen	OL	Western	London, ON
3	25	Kurtis Rourke	QB	Indiana	Oakville, ON
4	34	Seth Hundeby	LB	Saskatchewan	Saskatoon, SK
5	43	Liam Hoskins	LB	Windsor	London, ON
6	52	Gideon Agyei	DB	Calgary	Calgary, AB
8	69	Daniel Wiebe	WR	Saskatchewan	Saskatoon, SK

== Preseason ==
Week	Game	Date	Kickoff	Opponent	Results		TV	Venue	Attendance	Summary
Week	Game	Date	Kickoff	Opponent	Score	Record	TV	Venue	Attendance	Summary
A	Bye									
B	1	Sat, May 24	2:00 p.m. CST	at Winnipeg Blue Bombers	L 9–15	0–1	CFL+	Princess Auto Stadium	27,913	Recap
C	2	Fri, May 30	7:00 p.m. CST	vs. Winnipeg Blue Bombers	L 20–27	0–2	CFL+	Mosaic Stadium	26,293	Recap

# Games played with primary home uniforms.

== Regular season ==
=== Standings ===
West Division
Team	GP	W	L	T	Pts	PF	PA	Div	Stk	
Saskatchewan Roughriders	18	12	6	0	24	472	409	5–5	L2	Details
BC Lions	18	11	7	0	22	559	499	6–4	W6	Details
Calgary Stampeders	18	11	7	0	22	488	416	7–3	W3	Details
Winnipeg Blue Bombers	18	10	8	0	20	459	424	4–6	W2	Details
Edmonton Elks	18	7	11	0	14	422	490	3–7	L2	Details

=== Schedule ===
The week 6 game against the Calgary Stampeders was originally scheduled for July 11 at 7pm CST, but was postponed to July 12 at 2pm CST due to poor air quality.

Week	Game	Date	Kickoff	Opponent	Results		TV	Venue	Attendance	Summary
Week	Game	Date	Kickoff	Opponent	Score	Record	TV	Venue	Attendance	Summary
1	1	Thu, June 5	7:00 p.m. CST	vs. Ottawa Redblacks	W 31–26	1–0	TSN/RDS2/CBSSN	Mosaic Stadium	25,973	Recap
2	2	Sat, June 14	5:00 p.m. CST	at Hamilton Tiger-Cats	W 28–23	2–0	TSN/CTV/CBSSN	Hamilton Stadium	22,810	Recap
3	3	Fri, June 20	5:30 p.m. CST	at Toronto Argonauts	W 39–32	3–0	TSN/RDS	BMO Field	12,025	Recap
4	4	Sat, June 28	5:00 p.m. CST	vs. BC Lions	W 37–18	4–0	TSN/CTV/CBSSN	Mosaic Stadium	27,804	Recap
5	Bye									
6	5	Sat, July 12	2:00 p.m. CST	vs. Calgary Stampeders	L 10–24	4–1	TSN/RDS	Mosaic Stadium	26,675	Recap
7	6	Sat, July 19	5:00 p.m. CST	at BC Lions	W 33–27	5–1	TSN/CTV/CBSSN	BC Place	28,983	Recap
8	7	Fri, July 25	7:00 p.m. CST	vs. Edmonton Elks	W 21–18	6–1	TSN	Mosaic Stadium	27,933	Recap
9	8	Sat, Aug 2	5:00 p.m. CST	at Montreal Alouettes	W 34–6	7–1	TSN/RDS/CBSSN	Molson Stadium	21,654	Recap
10	Bye									
11	9	Sat, Aug 16	1:00 p.m. CST	vs. Hamilton Tiger-Cats	W 29–9	8–1	TSN/CTV/CBSSN	Mosaic Stadium	33,350	Recap
12	10	Sat, Aug 23	5:00 p.m. CST	at Calgary Stampeders	L 15–32	8–2	TSN	McMahon Stadium	28,295	Recap
13	ǁ 11 ǁ	Sun, Aug 31	5:00 p.m. CST	vs. Winnipeg Blue Bombers	W 34–30	9–2	TSN/CBSSN	Mosaic Stadium	34,243	Recap
14	12	Sat, Sept 6	2:00 p.m. CST	at Winnipeg Blue Bombers	W 21–13	10–2	TSN	Princess Auto Stadium	32,343	Recap
15	13	Sat, Sept 13	5:00 p.m. CST	vs. Montreal Alouettes	L 31–48	10–3	TSN/RDS	Mosaic Stadium	26,951	Recap
16	Bye									
17	14	Sat, Sep 27	5:00 p.m. CST	at Edmonton Elks	L 25–27	10–4	TSN	Commonwealth Stadium	30,053	Recap
18	15	Fri, Oct 3	5:30 p.m. CST	at Ottawa Redblacks	W 20–13	11–4	TSN/RDS	TD Place Stadium	18,250	Recap
19	16	Fri, Oct 10	7:00 p.m. CST	vs. Toronto Argonauts	W 27–19	12–4	TSN/RDS	Mosaic Stadium	27,500	Recap
20	17	Fri, Oct 17	6:00 p.m. CST	at Winnipeg Blue Bombers	L 16–17	12–5	TSN	Princess Auto Stadium	32,343	Recap
21	18	Sat, Oct 25	5:00 p.m. CST	vs. BC Lions	L 21–27	12–6	TSN	Mosaic Stadium	25,416	Recap

# Games played with primary home uniforms.
# Games played with white uniforms.
ǁ # ǁ Games played with retro alternate uniforms.
# Games played with obsidian alternate uniforms.

== Post-season ==
=== Schedule ===
Game	Date	Kickoff	Opponent	Results		TV	Venue	Attendance	Summary
Game	Date	Kickoff	Opponent	Score	Record	TV	Venue	Attendance	Summary
West Semi-Final	Bye								
ǁ West Final ǁ	Sat, Nov 8	5:30 p.m. CST	BC Lions	W 24–21	1–0	TSN/RDS	Mosaic Stadium	33,350	Recap
112th Grey Cup	Sun, Nov 16	5:00 p.m. CST	Montreal Alouettes	W 25–17	2–0	TSN/CTV/RDS	Princess Auto Stadium	32,343	Recap

# Games played with primary road uniforms.
ǁ # ǁ Games played with retro alternate uniforms.

== Roster ==
2025 Saskatchewan Roughriders final roster
**Quarterbacks**: 7 Trevor Harris; 9 Jake Maier; 17 Tommy Stevens; **Running backs**: 41 Albert Awachie; 30 Thomas Bertrand-Hudon; 45 A. J. Ouellette; 39 Morgen Runge; **Receivers**: 80 Ajou Ajou; 2 Mario Alford; 19 Samuel Emilus; 88 Dohnte Meyers; 83 Tommy Nield; 81 Mitchell Picton; 89 Kian Schaffer-Baker	**Offensive linemen**: 66 Jacob Brammer G; 62 Payton Collins T; 63 Logan Ferland C; 67 Zack Fry G; 52 Jermarcus Hardrick T; 64 Trevon Tate T; **Defensive linemen**: 95 Habakkuk Baldonado DE; 11 Malik Carney DE; 4 Micah Johnson DT; 91 Aaron Patrick DE; 42 Mike Rose DT; 96 Ali Saad DT; 92 Caleb Sanders DT; **Special teams**: 46 Jorgen Hus LS; 12 Brett Lauther K; 74 Jesse Mirco P	**Linebackers**: 32 A. J. Allen; 47 Aubrey Miller; 28 Melique Straker; 6 Jameer Thurman; 43 Nick Wiebe; **Defensive backs**: 33 Antoine Brooks; 25 Tevaughn Campbell; 38 Jayden Dalke; 20 Kerfalla Exumé; 22 DaMarcus Fields; 21 Jaxon Ford; 25 Nelson Lokombo; 0 Rolan Milligan; 1 C. J. Reavis; 8 Marcus Sayles	**Practice roster**: 78 Caleb Barajas T; 94 Chico Bennett Jr. DE; 97 Kendy Charles DT; 70 Joe Couch P; 77 Kenten Effa LB; 71 Micheal Hughes K; 79 James Lucio C; 27 Marcus Major RB; 84 Siaosi Mariner WR; 85 D'Sean Mimbs WR; 48 Tuasivi Nomura LB; 98 Deshawn Stevens DE; 50 Alphonzo Tuputala LB; 58 Darius Washington T/G; 90 Sylvain Younjouen DE; **Suspended list**: Julius Buelow T; D'Mitri Emmanuel G; Jonathan Hubbard T; Dazz Newsome WR	**Injured list**: 24 Mario Anderson RB; 35 C. J. Avery LB; 15 Shawn Bane WR; 29 Ka'Deem Carey RB; 14 Jack Coan QB; 99 Charbel Dabire DT; 18 Dhel Duncan-Busby WR; 53 Philippe Gagnon G; 65 Daniel Johnson T/G; 3 KeeSean Johnson WR; 29 Nafees Lyon DB; 49 Lake Korte-Moore DE; 93 Benoit Marion DE; 51 Sean McEwen C; 59 Braydon Noll C/G; 5 Shane Ray DE; 16 Sheldrick Redwine DB; 82 Joe Robustelli WR; 37 Benny Sapp III DB; 68 Noah Zerr G
Italics indicate American player • **Bold** indicates Global player

== Coaching staff ==
Saskatchewan Roughriders staff
Front office: President and CEO – Craig Reynolds; General Manager and Vice President of Football Operations – Jeremy O'Day; Assistant General Manager – Paul Jones; Assistant General Manager – Kyle Carson; Director of Football Operations – Jordan Greenly; Player Personnel Coordinator – Larry Dean; Head Athletic Therapist – Greg Mayer; Manager of Equipment – Gordon Gilroy; Head Coaches: Head Coach/Defensive Coordinator – Corey Mace; Offensive coaches: Offensive Coordinator – Marc Mueller; Offensive Line – Edwin Harrison; Receivers – Marquay McDaniel; Running Backs – Andrew Harris; Offensive Assistant – Josh Donnelly	Defensive coaches: Pass Game Coordinator and Defensive Backs – Josh Bell; Defensive Line – Phillip Daniels; Linebackers – Travis Brown; Defensive Assistant – Jordan Linnen; Special teams coaches: Special Teams Coordinator – Kent Maugeri; Strength and conditioning: Head of Strength and Conditioning – Dan Farthing; → Coaching staff
