= 2026 Saskatchewan Roughriders season =

CFL team season

- General manager: Jeremy O'Day
- President: Craig Reynolds
- Head coach: Corey Mace
- Home stadium: Mosaic Stadium

Results
- Record: 10–8
- Division place: 3rd, West
- Playoffs: Lost West Semi-Final
- Team MOP: Trevor Harris
- Team MODP: Jameer Thurman
- Team MOC: Kian Schaffer-Baker
- Team MOOL: Logan Ferland
- Team MOST: Melique Straker
- Team MOR: Daniel Wiebe

Uniform
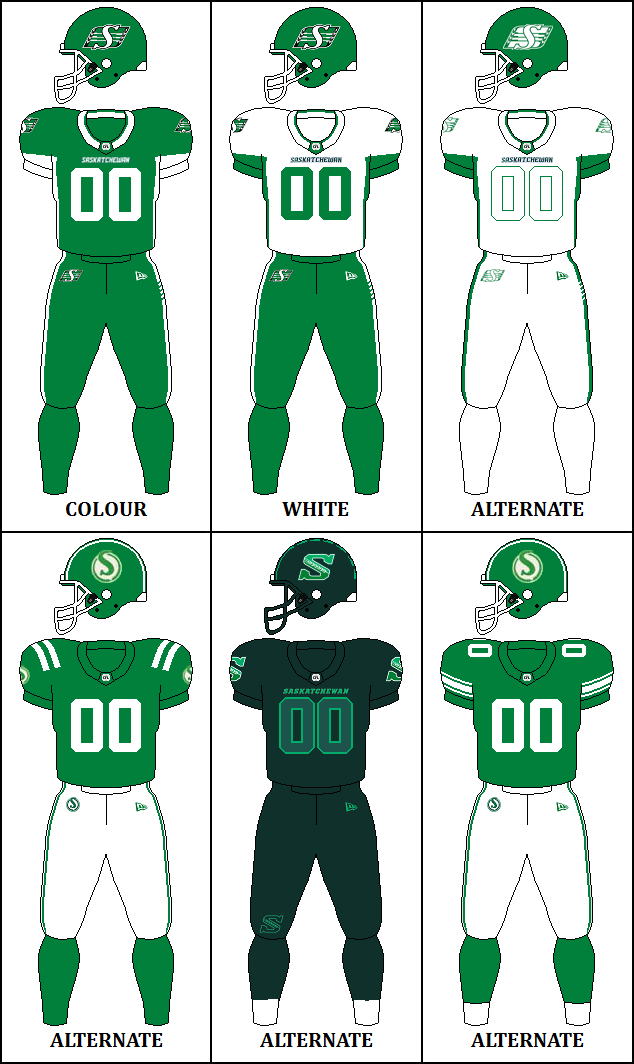

The 2026 Saskatchewan Roughriders season was the 68th season for the team in the Canadian Football League (CFL). It is the club's 117th year overall, and its 110th season of play. The Roughriders entered the season as defending Grey Cup champions following their victory in the 112th Grey Cup game. The Roughriders qualified for the playoffs for the third consecutive season after defeating the Alouettes in week 20. The Roughriders attempted to win their sixth Grey Cup championship, but were eliminated in the West Semi-Final 26–33, by the BC Lions. The Roughriders will play ten home games this season with the Toronto Argonauts deferring one of their home games due to the 2026 FIFA World Cup.

The 2026 CFL season was the third season under head coach Corey Mace and sixth season under general manager Jeremy O'Day. On July 18, 2026, team captain Jayden Dalke died in a traffic collision.

== Offseason ==
=== CFL Canadian draft ===
The 2026 CFL draft took place on April 28, 2026. The Roughriders had eight selections in the eight-round draft. Not including traded picks or forfeitures, the team selected ninth in each round of the draft after winning the 112th Grey Cup.

Round	Pick	Player	Position	University team
1	9	Malcolm Bell	DB	Michigan State
2	18	Dylan Djete	WR	Alabama State
3	29	Darius Bell	OL	East Carolina
4	38	Osasere Odemwingie	LB	Calgary
5	47	Jez Janvier	OL	Southern Mississippi
6	56	Albert Reese IV	OL	Mississippi State
7	65	Sherman McBean	WR	British Columbia
8	74	Ryan Speight	FB	Wilfrid Laurier

=== CFL global draft ===
The 2026 CFL global draft took place on April 29, 2026. The Roughriders had two selections in the draft, holding the ninth pick in each round.

Round	Pick	Player	Position	School	Nationality
1	9	Mapalo Mwansa	LB	Loughborough	England
2	18	Kansei Matsuzawa	K	Hawaii	Japan

== Preseason ==
The Roughriders announced on August 15, 2025, that they would play this season's home pre-season game in Saskatoon at Griffiths Stadium.

Week	Game	Date	Kickoff	Opponent	Results		TV	Venue	Attendance	Summary
Week	Game	Date	Kickoff	Opponent	Score	Record	TV	Venue	Attendance	Summary
A	1	Mon, May 18	1:00 p.m. CST	at Calgary Stampeders	L 15–20	0–1	CFL+	McMahon Stadium	16,986	Recap
B	2	Sat, May 23	5:00 p.m. CST	vs. Winnipeg Blue Bombers	W 31–27	1–1	CFL+	Griffiths Stadium	7,654	Recap
C	Bye									

# Games played with primary home uniforms.

== Regular season ==
=== Standings ===
West Division
Team	GP	W	L	Pts	PF	PA	Div	Stk	
Edmonton Elks	18	13	5	26	541	435	7–3	L1	Details
BC Lions	18	10	8	20	516	484	5–5	L2	Details
Saskatchewan Roughriders	18	10	8	20	486	473	5–5	W2	Details
Winnipeg Blue Bombers	18	9	9	18	475	492	4–6	W1	Details
Calgary Stampeders	18	9	9	18	632	587	4–6	W1	Details

=== Schedule ===
Week	Game	Date	Kickoff	Opponent	Results		TV	Venue	Attendance	Summary
Week	Game	Date	Kickoff	Opponent	Score	Record	TV	Venue	Attendance	Summary
1	Bye									
2	1	Sat, June 13	5:00 p.m. CST	vs. BC Lions	W 31–27	1–0	TSN/CBSSN	Mosaic Stadium	30,168	Recap
3	2	Sat, June 20	5:00 p.m. CST	at Calgary Stampeders	W 40–37 (2OT)	2–0	TSN/CBSSN	McMahon Stadium	21,262	Recap
4	3	Fri, June 26	7:00 p.m. CST	vs. Toronto Argonauts	L 34–40	2–1	TSN/CBSSN	Mosaic Stadium	25,035	Recap
5	4	Fri, July 3	5:30 p.m. CST	at Ottawa Redblacks	W 27–22	3–1	TSN	TD Place Stadium	15,154	Recap
6	5	Sun, July 12	5:00 p.m. CST	vs. Hamilton Tiger-Cats	W 38–7	4–1	TSN/CBSSN	Mosaic Stadium	25,476	Recap
7	Bye									
8	6	Thu, July 23	7:00 p.m. CST	vs. Edmonton Elks	L 34–36	4–2	TSN/RDS/CBSSN	Mosaic Stadium	28,513	Recap
9	7	Sat, Aug 1	5:00 p.m. CST	at Edmonton Elks	W 28–26	5–2	TSN/CBSSN	Commonwealth Stadium	31,757	Recap
10	8	Fri, Aug 7	7:00 p.m. CST	vs. Ottawa Redblacks	W 42–20	6–2	TSN/RDS/CBSSN	Mosaic Stadium	29,798	Recap
11	9	Sat, Aug 15	5:00 p.m. CST	at Hamilton Tiger-Cats	L 19–26	6–3	TSN/CBSSN	Hamilton Stadium	20,791	Recap
12	10	Sun, Aug 23	5:00 p.m. CST	at BC Lions	L 16–30	6–4	TSN/RDS	BC Place	30,083	Recap
13	11	Sat, Aug 29	5:00 p.m. CST	vs. Toronto Argonauts	W 28–24	7–4	TSN	Mosaic Stadium	33,350	Recap
14	ǁ 12 ǁ	Sun, Sep 6	5:00 p.m. CST	vs. Winnipeg Blue Bombers	W 32–26 (OT)	8–4	TSN/CBSSN	Mosaic Stadium	34,352	Recap
15	13	Sat, Sept 12	2:00 p.m. CST	at Winnipeg Blue Bombers	L 6–19	8–5	TSN/CTV	Princess Auto Stadium	32,343	Recap
16	Bye									
17	14	Fri, Sep 25	8:30 p.m. CST	at BC Lions	L 24–31	8–6	TSN	BC Place	24,183	Recap
18	15	Fri, Oct 2	7:30 p.m. CST	vs. Calgary Stampeders	L 31–37	8–7	TSN	Mosaic Stadium	29,412	Recap
19	16	Mon, Oct 12	11:00 a.m. CST	at Montreal Alouettes	L 24–44	8–8	TSN/RDS/CBSSN	Molson Stadium	23,035	Recap
20	▪ 17 ▪	Sat, Oct 17	1:00 p.m. CST	vs. Montreal Alouettes	W 16–12	9–8	TSN/RDS/CTV	Mosaic Stadium	28,611	Recap
21	18	Sat, Oct 24	1:00 p.m. CST	vs. Edmonton Elks	W 16–9	10–8	TSN/CTV	Mosaic Stadium	25,521	Recap

# Games played with primary home uniforms.
# Games played with white uniforms.
# Games played with white alternate uniforms.
ǁ # ǁ Games played with retro alternate uniforms.
# Games played with obsidian alternate uniforms.
▪ # ▪ Games played with 1966 tribute uniforms.

== Post-season ==
=== Schedule ===
Game	Date	Kickoff	Opponent	Results		TV	Venue	Attendance	Summary
Game	Date	Kickoff	Opponent	Score	Record	TV	Venue	Attendance	Summary
West Semi-Final	Sat, Oct 31	2:30 p.m. CST	at BC Lions	L 26–33	0–1	TSN/RDS	BC Place	23,283	Recap

== Team ==
=== Roster ===
Saskatchewan Roughriders roster
**Quarterbacks**: 14 Jack Coan; 7 Trevor Harris; 17 Tommy Stevens; **Receivers**: 18 Dhel Duncan-Busby; 19 Samuel Emilus; 88 Johnny Johnson III; 3 KeeSean Johnson; 89 Kian Schaffer-Baker; 86 Mathew Sexton; 87 Daniel Wiebe; **Running backs**: 30 Thomas Bertrand-Hudon; 45 A. J. Ouellette	**Offensive linemen**: 66 Jacob Brammer; 62 Payton Collins; 63 Logan Ferland; 67 Zack Fry; 52 Jermarcus Hardrick; 65 Daniel Johnson; **Defensive linemen**: 95 Devin Adams; 58 Habakkuk Baldonado; 98 Desmond Evans; 93 Benoit Marion; 42 Mike Rose; 96 Ali Saad; 99 Caleb Sanders; 9 James Vaughters	**Linebackers**: 48 David Gbenda; 46 Justin Herdman-Reed; 47 Aubrey Miller Jr.; 35 Seyi Oladipo; 28 Melique Straker; 6 Jameer Thurman; 33 Ryder Varga; 2 Josh Woods; **Defensive backs**: 4 Malcolm Bell; 27 James Burgess Jr.; 26 Tevaughn Campbell; 31 Jonathan Edouard; 20 Kerfalla Exumé; 22 DaMarcus Fields; 21 Jaxon Ford; 8 Marcus Sayles; **Special teams**: 91 Oscar Chapman P; 37 Mike Benson LS; 12 Brett Lauther K	**Reserve**: 5 Antoine Brooks Jr. DB; 10 Brayden Schager QB; **1-game injured**: 41 Albert Awachie RB; 80 Dylan Djete WR; 49 Lake Korte-Moore DL; 25 Nelson Lokombo DB; 0 Rolan Milligan DB; 94 Aaron Patrick DL; 50 Derick Roberson DL; 43 Nick Wiebe LB; **6-game injured**: 51 Aaron Crawford LS; 16 JuJu Hughes DB; 1 James Letcher Jr. WR/KR; 39 Morgen Runge FB	**Practice roster**: 61 Erik Andersen OL; 53 Darius Bell OL; 75 Peter Boersch RB; 24 Quali Conley RB; 32 Jyron Gilmore DB; 11 Alex Hale K; 92 Liam Hoskins DL; 15 Deon Jackson RB; 77 Treven Ma'ae DL; 85 D'Sean Mimbs WR; 90 Jaylen Pate DL; 69 Thomas Perry OL; 81 Marcus Sanders Jr. WR; 79 Benjamin Walz WR; 54 Jaison Williams OL; **Suspended**: 0 D'Mitri Emmanuel OL
Italics indicate American player • **Bold** indicates Global player • 45 Active, 2 Reserve, 12 Injured, 15 Practice, 1 Suspended; Roster updated 2026-10-31 • Depth chart • Transactions • More CFL rosters

=== Coaching staff ===
Saskatchewan Roughriders staff
**Front office**: President and CEO – Craig Reynolds; General manager and Vice President of Football Operations – Jeremy O'Day; Assistant General Manager – Paul Jones; Assistant General Manager – Kyle Carson; Director of Football Operations – Jordan Greenly; Player Personnel Coordinator – Larry Dean; Head Athletic Therapist – Greg Mayer; Manager of Equipment – Gordon Gilroy; **Head coach**: Head coach – Corey Mace; **Offensive coaches**: Offensive Coordinator – Marc Mueller; Offensive Line – Edwin Harrison; Receivers – Marquay McDaniel; Running Backs – Andrew Harris; Offensive Assistant – Josh Donnelly	**Defensive coaches**: Defensive Coordinator – Josh Bell; Run Game Coordinator and Linebackers – Travis Brown; Defensive Line – Micah Johnson; Defensive Backs – Jordan Linnen; **Special teams coaches**: Special Teams Coordinator – Kent Maugeri; Special Teams Assistant – Jeff Stusek; **Strength and conditioning**: Head of Strength and Conditioning – Dan Farthing; → Coaching Staff → More CFL staffs
