= Payton Collins =

American football player (born 2000)

No. 62 – Saskatchewan Roughriders
- Position: Offensive lineman
- Roster status: Active
- CFL status: American

Personal information
- Born: December 22, 2000 (age 25)
- Listed height: 6 ft 7 in (2.01 m)
- Listed weight: 301 lb (137 kg)

Career information
- High school: Bishop Hartley (Columbus, Ohio)
- College: Eastern Kentucky
- NFL draft: 2025: undrafted

Career history
- Saskatchewan Roughriders (2025–present)

Awards and highlights
- Grey Cup champion (2025); First-team All-American (2024); UAC Offensive Lineman of the Year (2024); 2× First-team All-UAC (2023–2024); ASUN Offensive Lineman of the Year (2022); First-team All-ASUN (2022); Second-team All-ASUN (2021)
- Stats at CFL.ca

Payton Collins (born December 22, 2000) is an American professional football offensive lineman for the Saskatchewan Roughriders of the Canadian Football League (CFL). He played college football at Eastern Kentucky.

== Early life ==
Payton C. Collins was born on December 22, 2000. He played high school football at Bishop Hartley High School in Columbus, Ohio. He was named first-team all-state his senior year. Collins also played basketball in high school, averaging 16 points and 10 rebounds per game while earning first-team All-CCL and second team all-district honors.

== College career ==
Collins played college football for the Eastern Kentucky Colonels of Eastern Kentucky University from 2019 to 2024. He played in the season finale as a true freshman, and took a redshirt for the year. He started all nine games at left tackle during the COVID-19 shortened 2020 season. Collins started all 11 games at left tackle in 2021, garnering second-team All-Atlantic Sun Conference (ASUN) recognition. He started all 12 games at left tackle during the 2022 season, earning ASUN Offensive Lineman of the Year, first-team All-ASUN, and ASUN All-Academic honors. He was also named a Phil Steele/DraftScout fourth-team All-American for his performance during the 2022 season. Collins finished his college career by earning first-team All-United Athletic Conference (UAC) honors from 2023 to 2024. He was named the UAC Offensive Lineman of the Year for 2024 by Phil Steele while also garnering Stats Perform FCS first-team All-American honors.

Collins played in a school-record 56 consecutive games. He graduated from Eastern Kentucky in spring 2023 with a bachelors in general business. After his college career, he was invited to the Hula Bowl all-star game.

== Professional career ==
Pre-draft measurables
Height	Weight	Arm length	Hand span	Wingspan	40-yard dash	10-yard split	20-yard split	20-yard shuttle	Three-cone drill	Vertical jump	Broad jump	Bench press
6 ft 6 1/8 in (1.98 m)	299 lb (136 kg)	32 7/8 in (0.84 m)	8 7/8 in (0.23 m)	6 ft 8 1/2 in (2.04 m)	5.28 s	1.83 s	3.06 s	4.82 s	7.97 s	24.5 in (0.62 m)	8 ft 10 in (2.69 m)	17 reps
All values from Pro Day

After going undrafted in the 2025 NFL draft, Collins signed with the Saskatchewan Roughriders of the Canadian Football League on May 2, 2025. He was moved to the practice roster on June 1. He was promoted to the active roster on June 4, and started in place of the injured Jacob Brammer in the team's season opener against the Ottawa Redblacks on June 6. However, Collins suffered a knee injury during the game and was placed on injured reserve on June 9. He was activated from injured reserve on August 1, 2025, and returned to the starting lineup.
