= Dohnte Meyers =

American football player (born 2000)

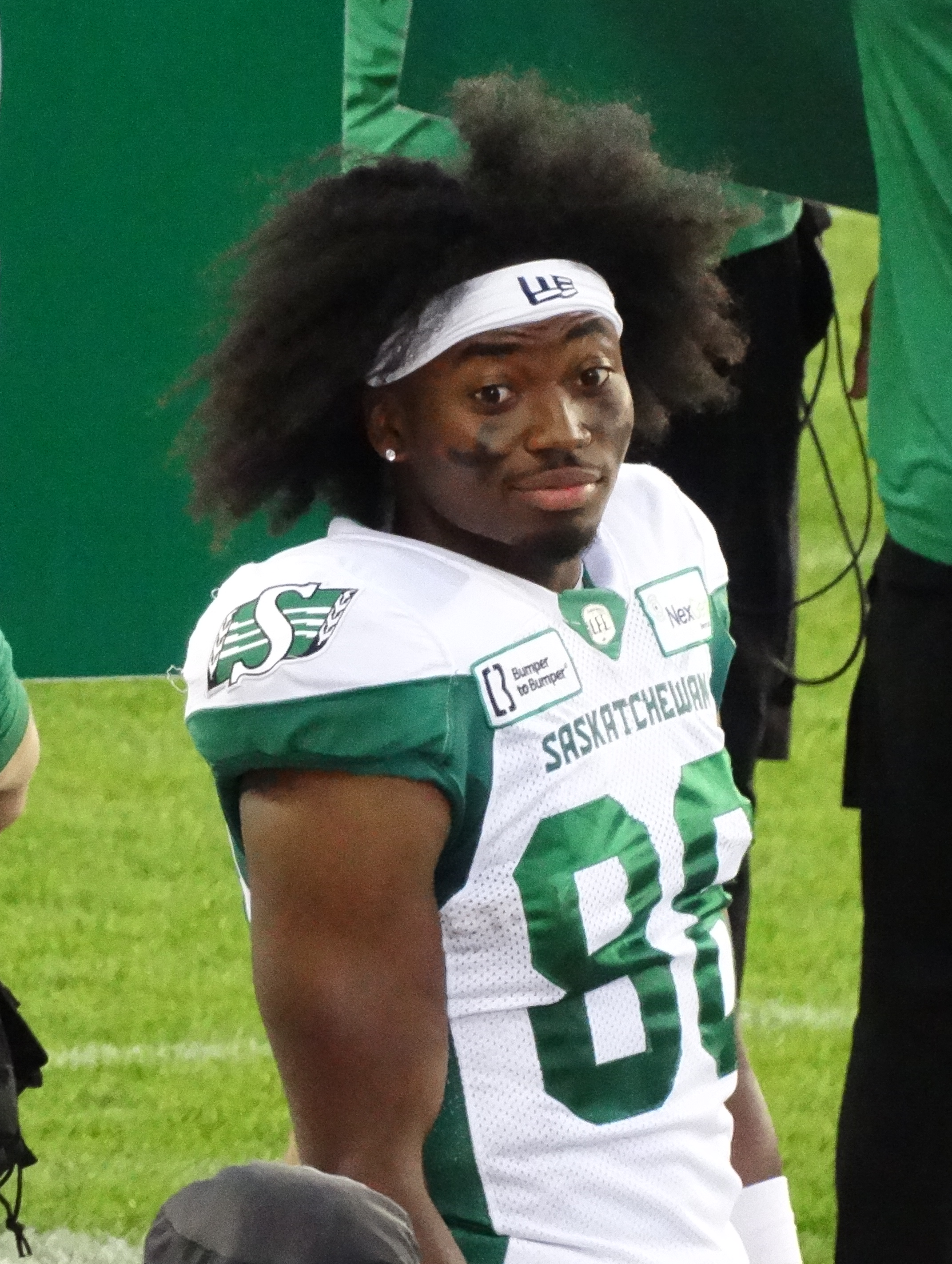
- Meyers with the Saskatchewan Roughriders in 2024

No. 81 – Cincinnati Bengals
- Positions: Wide receiver, kick returner
- Roster status: Active

Personal information
- Born: July 6, 2000 (age 26); Brooklyn, New York, U.S.
- Listed height: 5 ft 11 in (1.80 m)
- Listed weight: 186 lb (84 kg)

Career information
- High school: Norcross (Norcross, Georgia)
- College: Presbyterian (2018–2019); Delta State (2020–2022)
- NFL draft: 2023: undrafted

Career history
- Saskatchewan Roughriders (2024–2025); Cincinnati Bengals (2026–present)

Awards and highlights
- Grey Cup champion (2025); CFL West All-Star (2025); First-team All-GSC (2022)

Career NFL statistics
- Games played: 4
- Receptions: 11
- Receiving yards: 129
- Receiving touchdowns: 0
- Stats at Pro Football Reference

Career CFL statistics
- Games played: 19
- Receptions: 89
- Receiving yards: 1,405
- Receiving touchdowns: 9
- Stats at CFL.ca

Dohnte Meyers (born July 6, 2000) is an American professional football wide receiver and kick returner for the Cincinnati Bengals of the National Football League (NFL). He is a Grey Cup champion after winning with the Saskatchewan Roughriders in 2025. He played college football at Presbyterian and Delta State.

== Early life ==
Meyers was born in Brooklyn, New York and attended Norcross High School in Norcross, Georgia. He was named second team All-Region in 2017 as a punt returner.

== College career ==
Meyers first played college football for the Presbyterian Blue Hose from 2018 to 2019. He played in eight games, all starts, his freshman year in 2018, catching 17 passes for 186 yards and two touchdowns. He appeared in 12 games, all starts, in 2019, recording 37 receptions for 485 yards and five touchdowns.

Meyers transferred to play for the Delta State Statesmen from 2020 to 2022. However, the team's season was cancelled due to the COVID-19 pandemic. He played in 11 games during the 2021 season, catching 55 passes for 665 yards and five touchdowns. He appeared in 13 games in 2022, totaling 65 receptions for 877 yards and eight touchdowns, earning first-team All-GSC honors.

== Professional career ==
Pre-draft measurables
Height	Weight	Arm length	Hand span	Wingspan	40-yard dash	10-yard split	20-yard split	20-yard shuttle	Three-cone drill	Vertical jump	Broad jump	Bench press
5 ft 9 1/4 in (1.76 m)	188 lb (85 kg)	31 in (0.79 m)	8 7/8 in (0.23 m)	6 ft 0 3/8 in (1.84 m)	4.54 s	1.56 s	2.54 s	4.23 s	6.99 s	35.0 in (0.89 m)	10 ft 6 in (3.20 m)	15 reps
All values from Pro Day

After going undrafted in the 2023 NFL draft, Meyers attended rookie minicamp on a tryout basis with the Atlanta Falcons.

=== Saskatchewan Roughriders ===
Meyers signed a futures contract with the Saskatchewan Roughriders of the Canadian Football League (CFL) on October 25, 2023. Following training camp for the 2024 season, he was moved to the practice roster on June 1, 2024. Meyers was later promoted to the active roster and made his professional debut on August 8, against the Ottawa Redblacks, where he caught eight passes for 101 yards in a 22–22 tie. He scored his first professional touchdown on September 1, in the Labour Day Classic against the Winnipeg Blue Bombers on an 18-yard pass from Trevor Harris. He played in four games before suffering a shoulder injury and spending the remainder of the year on the injured list. For the season, Meyers recorded 24 receptions for 349 yards and one touchdown.

In 2025, Meyers made the team's active roster following training camp where he played in 15 regular season games and had 65 catches for 1,056 yards and eight touchdowns. He clinched his first 1,000-yard season against the Redblacks where he had a career-high 158 receiving yards, but also suffered an ankle injury and missed the remainder of the regular season. Despite missing three games, he was named a West Division All-Star. Meyers returned in time for the playoffs and made his post-season debut in the West Final against the BC Lions. In that game, he had three receptions for 40 yards in the 24–21 victory to help send the Roughriders to the 112th Grey Cup. In his first Grey Cup appearance, Meyers had four catches for 76 yards as the Roughriders defeated the Montreal Alouettes 25–17 for the championship victory. As a pending free agent, Meyers was granted an early release on January 8, 2026, to pursue an NFL opportunity.

=== Cincinnati Bengals ===
On January 8, 2026, Meyers signed a reserve/futures contract with the Cincinnati Bengals. In the 2026 preseason, Meyers recorded 11 receptions for 121 yards. In addition, he recorded 22 rushing yards and 99 return yards, leading the Bengals in yards gained across the preseason, where the Bengals went a perfect 3–0. He was the leading receiver for the Bengals in Week 3 of the preseason, recording 3 receptions for 51 yards in a 30–13 win over the Philadelphia Eagles.

Meyers had a breakout game in Week 4 of the regular season, catching 7 passes for 82 yards in the Bengals' 22–17 loss to the Jacksonville Jaguars.
