= Ali Saad (Canadian football) =

Canadian gridiron football player (born 2002)

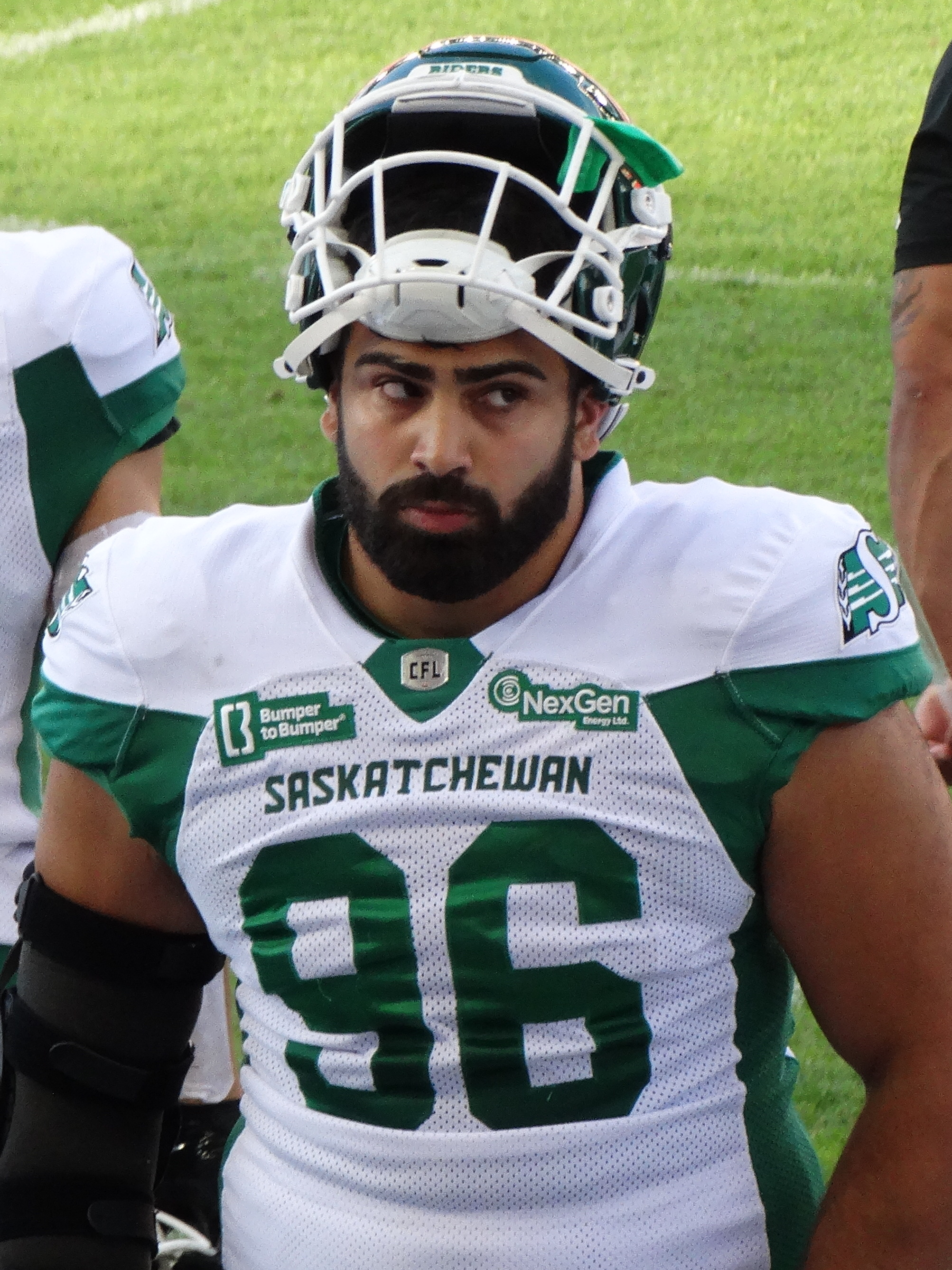
- Saad with the Saskatchewan Roughriders in 2025

No. 96 – Saskatchewan Roughriders
- Position: Defensive lineman
- Roster status: Active
- CFL status: National

Personal information
- Born: September 22, 2002 (age 24); Windsor, Ontario, Canada
- Listed height: 6 ft 3 in (1.91 m)
- Listed weight: 280 lb (127 kg)

Career information
- High school: Dearborn High
- College: Bowling Green
- CFL draft: 2025: 1st round, 4th overall pick

Awards and highlights
- Grey Cup champion (2025)
- Stats at CFL.ca

Ali Saad (born September 22, 2002) is a Canadian professional football defensive lineman for the Saskatchewan Roughriders of the Canadian Football League (CFL).

== College career ==
Saad enrolled at the University of Minnesota in 2020 to play for the Golden Gophers, but he used a redshirt season and did not appear in any games. He then transferred to Bowling Green State University where he played for the Bowling Green Falcons from 2021 to 2024. He played in 44 games where he had 78 tackles, including 14 tackles for a loss, six sacks, four forced fumbles, and one blocked kick.

=== Statistics ===
Year	Team	Games		Tackles				Fumbles				Interceptions			
Year	Team	GP	GS	Cmb	Solo	Ast	Sck	FF	FR	Yds	TD	Int	Yds	TD	PD
2020	Minnesota	Redshirt													
2021	Bowling Green	10	0	9	7	2	0.0	0	0	0	0	0	0	0	0
2022	Bowling Green	8	0	5	1	4	0.0	0	0	0	0	0	0	0	0
2023	Bowling Green	13	13	24	13	11	1.5	2	0	0	0	0	0	0	0
2024	Bowling Green	13	13	40	19	21	6.0	2	0	0	0	0	0	0	0
Career		44	26	78	40	38	6.0	4	0	0	0	0	0	0	0

== Professional career ==
Pre-draft measurables
Height	Weight	Arm length	Hand span	Wingspan	40-yard dash	10-yard split	20-yard split	20-yard shuttle	Three-cone drill	Vertical jump	Broad jump
6 ft 1 3/4 in (1.87 m)	282 lb (128 kg)	32 1/8 in (0.82 m)	10 1/4 in (0.26 m)	6 ft 5 1/4 in (1.96 m)	5.23 s	1.78 s	2.91 s	4.59 s	7.50 s	30.5 in (0.77 m)	8 ft 10 in (2.69 m)
All values from Pro Day

In the final Canadian Football League's Amateur Scouting Bureau rankings for players eligible for the 2025 CFL draft, Saad was listed as the 11th-best player available. He was then selected in the first round, fourth overall, in the draft by the Saskatchewan Roughriders and signed with the team on May 12, 2025. He made the team's opening day roster in 2025 and played in his first professional game on June 6, 2025, against the Ottawa Redblacks, where he had one defensive tackle.
