= Tommy Nield =

Canadian gridiron football player (born 1999)

- Nield with the Winnipeg Blue Bombers in 2026

No. 83 – Winnipeg Blue Bombers
- Position: Wide receiver
- Roster status: Active
- CFL status: National

Personal information
- Born: April 17, 1999 (age 27); Guelph, Ontario, Canada
- Listed height: 6 ft 3 in (1.91 m)
- Listed weight: 212 lb (96 kg)

Career information
- High school: Centennial CVI
- University: McMaster
- CFL draft: 2021: 4th round, 30th overall pick

Career history
- 2021–2024: Toronto Argonauts
- 2025: Saskatchewan Roughriders
- 2026–present: Winnipeg Blue Bombers

Awards and highlights
- 3× Grey Cup champion (2022, 2024, 2025); Yates Cup champion (2019)

Career CFL statistics as of Week 18, 2026
- Games played: 69
- Receptions: 143
- Receiving yards: 1,790
- Receiving touchdowns: 8
- Stats at CFL.ca

Tommy Nield (born April 17, 1999) is a Canadian professional football wide receiver for the Winnipeg Blue Bombers of the Canadian Football League (CFL). He is a three-time Grey Cup champion after winning with Toronto Argonauts in 2022 and 2024, and with the Saskatchewan Roughriders in 2025.

== University career ==
While he had contemplated playing for his hometown Guelph Gryphons, Nield committed to the McMaster Marauders program where he played U Sports football from 2017 to 2019. In his third year with McMaster, he caught 48 passes for 688 yards and four touchdowns and was named a second-team OUA All-Star. He won the 2019 Yates Cup with the Marauders and was the leading receiver in the Mitchell Bowl loss to the Calgary Dinos where he had eight catches for 151 yards and one touchdown. He did not play in 2020 due to the cancellation of the 2020 U Sports football season and remained draft-eligible for the Canadian Football League in 2021.

== Professional career ==
Pre-draft measurables
Height	Weight	40-yard dash	20-yard shuttle	Three-cone drill	Broad jump	Bench press
6 ft 3 1/2 in (1.92 m)	204.8 lb (93 kg)	4.60 s	4.13 s	6.70 s	10 ft 2 7/8 in (3.12 m)	9 reps
All values from CFL Combine

=== Toronto Argonauts ===
Nield was drafted in the fourth round, 30th overall, in the 2021 CFL draft by the Toronto Argonauts and signed with the team on May 13, 2021. Following training camp, he agreed to a practice roster spot, but made his professional debut soon after in week 5 against the Hamilton Tiger-Cats on September 6, 2021, in the Labour Day Classic. He made his first professional start on October 30, 2021, against the BC Lions, but did not record a catch or a target in the game. He played in eight regular season games in 2021, but did not record any statistics.

After making the opening day roster for the 2022, Nield went back and forth to the practice roster over the next few games. However, he started at wide receiver on July 31, 2022, against the Ottawa Redblacks, where he recorded his first catch and finished the game with three receptions for 50 yards. He scored his first career touchdown on a 37-yard reception from McLeod Bethel-Thompson on October 8, 2022, against the BC Lions. He played in 13 regular season games, starting in three, where he had ten catches for 191 yards and one touchdown. He also played in both post-season games, including the 109th Grey Cup where the Argonauts defeated the Winnipeg Blue Bombers.

In the 2023 season, Nield played in just nine regular season games, starting in five, where he had a career-high 32 catches for 384 yards and a two-point convert. He also played in the team's East Final loss to the Montreal Alouettes, but did not record any statistics.

In 2024, Nield played in the first four games before suffering an injury and sitting out the following six games. He returned to play in the rest of the regular season games, playing in 12 games total, starting in two, where he had 21 catches for 201 yards and one touchdown. He was a healthy scratch for the team's three post-season games, including the 111th Grey Cup where the Argonauts' defeated the Winnipeg Blue Bombers 41–24. He was released in the following offseason on February 3, 2025.

=== Saskatchewan Roughriders ===
On February 4, 2025, it was announced that Nield had signed with the Saskatchewan Roughriders. He played in 13 games where he had 42 receptions for 535 yards and five touchdowns. He became a free agent upon the expiry of his contract on February 10, 2026.

=== Winnipeg Blue Bombers ===
On February 10, 2026, it was announced that Nield had signed with the Winnipeg Blue Bombers.

== Personal life ==
Nield's father, Pat, played football for the Guelph Gryphons.
