= Jesse Mirco =

Australian gridiron football player (born 1997)

Profile
- Position: Punter

Personal information
- Born: 28 January 1997 (age 29); Fremantle, Western Australia
- Listed height: 6 ft 1 in (1.85 m)
- Listed weight: 222 lb (101 kg)

Career information
- High school: ProKick Australia
- College: Ohio State (2021–2023); Vanderbilt (2024)
- CFL draft: 2025G: 2nd round, 15th overall pick

Career history
- Saskatchewan Roughriders (2025); Hamilton Tiger-Cats (2026)*
- * Offseason or practice squad member only

Awards and highlights
- Grey Cup champion (2025); First-team All-SEC (2024)
- Stats at CFL.ca

Jesse Mirco (born 28 January 1997) is an Australian gridiron football punter. He was most recently a member of the Hamilton Tiger-Cats of the Canadian Football League (CFL). He played college football for the Vanderbilt Commodores and Ohio State Buckeyes.

== Early life ==
Mirco attended ProKick Australia and was rated as a three-star recruit and the number five punter by 247Sports. Mirco committed to play college football at the Ohio State University.

== College career ==
=== Ohio State ===
Mirco entered the 2021 season as the Buckeyes starting punter at the age of 24. In week 2, he punted three times, where all three were downed inside the 20 yard line, while two were downed at the one-yard line. Mirco finished the 2021 season with 31 punts for 1,310 yards. In week 5 of the 2022 season, he converted a fake punt where he ran for 22 yards in a win over Rutgers. In week 10, Mirco punted seven times for 352 yards with an average of 50.4 yards, including two punts over 50 yards, and downed a punt inside the five-yard line. He finished the 2022 season with 49 punts for 2,223 yards and an average of 45.4 yards per punt, earning all-Big Ten Conference honorable mention. Mirco was one of the ten semifinalists for the Ray Guy Award. For the 2023 season, Mirco was named to the Ray Guy Award watchlist.

On 30 December 2023, shortly after playing in the 2023 Cotton Bowl, Mirco announced that he would enter the transfer portal.

=== Vanderbilt ===
On 3 January 2024, Mirco announced he would be transferring to Vanderbilt. At Vanderbilt he earned All SEC Honors in 2024.

== Professional career ==
=== Saskatchewan Roughriders ===
Mirco went undrafted in the 2025 NFL draft but was drafted by the Saskatchewan Roughriders of the Canadian Football League in the 2nd round (15th overall) of the 2025 CFL global draft. He later signed with the Roughriders on 17 September 2025. He made his professional debut on 27 September 2025, against the Edmonton Elks where he had four punts with a 52.3-yard average. He played in the last five games of the regular season where he punted 28 times with a 47.4-yard average. He also played in both post-season games, including the 112th Grey Cup where he had six punts for a 49.3-yard average and scored one single in the team's victory over the Montreal Alouettes.

On May 30, 2026, Mirco was released by the Roughriders as part of final roster cuts.

=== Hamilton Tiger-Cats ===
On 23 July 2026, it was announced that Mirco had signed with the Hamilton Tiger-Cats. He remained on the practice roster until his release on 1 September 2026.
