= D'Sean Mimbs =

Canadian football player (born 2000)

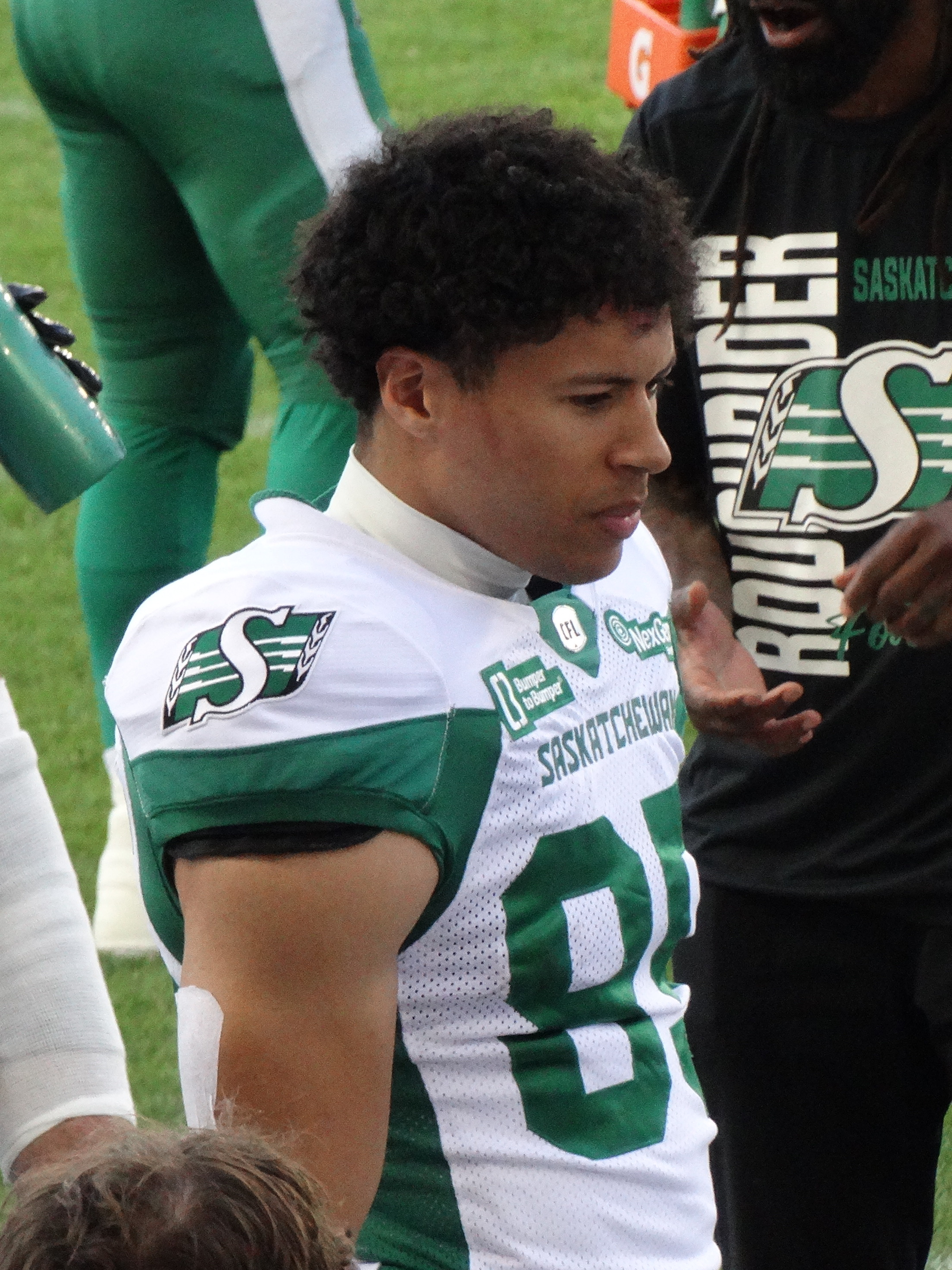
- Mimbs with the Saskatchewan Roughriders in 2025

No. 85 – Saskatchewan Roughriders
- Position: Wide receiver
- Roster status: Practice roster
- CFL status: National

Personal information
- Born: September 21, 2000 (age 26)
- Listed height: 6 ft 0 in (1.83 m)
- Listed weight: 188 lb (85 kg)

Career information
- High school: Winston Knoll (Regina, Saskatchewan)
- University: Saskatchewan (2019); Regina (2020–2024)
- CFL draft: 2024: 6th round, 50th overall pick

Career history
- Saskatchewan Roughriders (2024)*; Saskatchewan Roughriders (2025–present)
- * Offseason or practice squad member only

Awards and highlights
- Grey Cup champion (2025)
- Stats at CFL.ca

D'Sean Mimbs (born September 21, 2000) is a Canadian professional football wide receiver for the Saskatchewan Roughriders of the Canadian Football League (CFL). He played U Sports football at Regina.

== Early life ==
D'Sean Mimbs was born on September 21, 2000. He played high school football at Winston Knoll Collegiate in Regina, Saskatchewan. As a senior in 2017, he caught 36 passes for 733 yards and seven touchdowns. In 2018, Mimbs attended Birmingham Sports Academy in Birmingham, Alabama, for a postgraduate year.

== University career ==
Mimbs first enrolled at the University of Saskatchewan to play U Sports football for the Saskatchewan Huskies. He redshirted the 2019 season.

In 2020, Mimbs transferred to play for the Regina Rams of the University of Regina in order to be closer to his family and friends. The 2020 U Sports football season was cancelled due to the COVID-19 pandemic. He started all six games during the 2021 season at slotback, catching 18 passes while leading the team in both receiving yards (288) and touchdown catches (five). Mimbs started all eight games at slotback in 2022, recording 31 receptions for 386 yards and two touchdowns. He appeared in six of eight games during the 2023 season, catching 30 passes for 460 yards and one touchdown.

Mimbs was one of 100 players invited to the national CFL Combine in Winnipeg in March 2024. He was selected by the Saskatchewan Roughriders in the sixth round, with the 50th overall pick, of the 2024 CFL draft. He signed with the team on May 6, 2024. He suffered a knee injury in training camp and was released on June 1, 2024, before the start of the 2024 CFL season. Mimbs then returned to Regina for his final season of U Sports eligibility. He played in 11 games for the Rams during the 2024 season, totaling 45 catches for 512 yards and two touchdowns.

== Professional career ==
Pre-draft measurables
Height	Weight	Vertical jump	Broad jump	Bench press
5 ft 11 7/8 in (1.83 m)	188 lb (85 kg)	37.0 in (0.94 m)	10 ft 7 3/4 in (3.24 m)	14 reps
All values from CFL Combine

Mimbs re-signed with the Roughriders on November 25, 2024. He was moved to the practice roster on June 1, 2025, promoted to the active roster on June 9, and moved back to the practice roster on July 18, 2025.

== Personal life ==
Mimbs' father Robert Mimbs also played in the CFL.
