= A. J. Allen =

Canadian gridiron football player (born 1998)

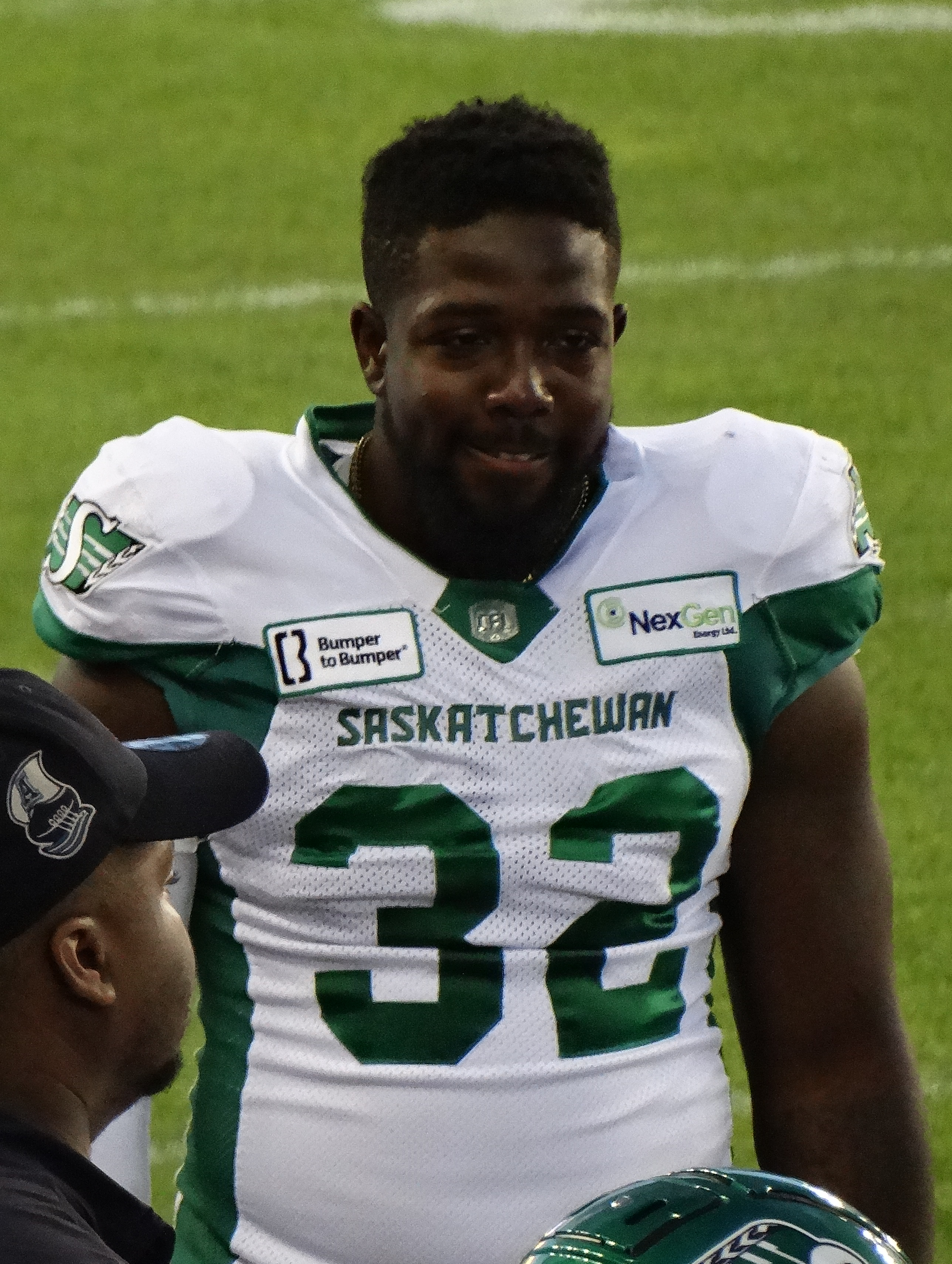
- Allen with the Saskatchewan Roughriders in 2024

No. 0 – Ottawa Redblacks
- Position: Linebacker
- Roster status: Active
- CFL status: National

Personal information
- Born: April 14, 1998 (age 28); Burlington, Ontario, Canada
- Listed height: 6 ft 0 in (1.83 m)
- Listed weight: 235 lb (107 kg)

Career information
- High school: M. M. Robinson (Burlington, Ontario)
- University: Guelph
- CFL draft: 2020: 4th round, 35th overall pick

Career history
- Saskatchewan Roughriders (2021)*; Saskatchewan Roughriders (2022–2025); Ottawa Redblacks (2026–present)
- * Offseason or practice squad member only

Awards and highlights
- Grey Cup champion (2025); All-Canadian (2021); OUA All-Star (2021)
- Stats at CFL.ca

A. J. Allen (born April 14, 1998) is a Canadian professional football linebacker for the Ottawa Redblacks of the Canadian Football League (CFL). He played U Sports football at Guelph.

== Early life ==
Allen was born in Burlington, Ontario, and attended M. M. Robinson High School in Burlington.

== University career ==
Allen first played U Sports football for the Guelph Gryphons for four years, recording 63.5 tackles, 5.5 sacks, one forced fumble and three fumble recoveries. He was then selected by the Saskatchewan Roughriders of the Canadian Football League (CFL) in the fourth round, with the 35th overall pick, of the 2020 CFL draft. However, the 2020 CFL season was later cancelled due to the COVID-19 pandemic. He officially signed with the Roughriders on January 19, 2021. Allen did not make the team and was sent back to Guelph for another season. In his fifth and final season at Guelph in 2021, Allen totaled 58 tackles, three sacks and two forced fumbles in seven games, earning All-Canadian and Ontario University Athletics (OUA) All-Star honors. He was also named the OUA's most outstanding stand-up defensive player.

== Professional career ==
Allen re-signed with the Roughriders on December 14, 2021. He was placed on injured reserve on June 17, 2022, and activated from injured reserve on July 28. He dressed in 12 games during the 2022 CFL season, recording six defensive tackles and six special teams tackles. Allen dressed in all 18 games in 2023, accumulating 19 defensive tackles, 19 special teams tackles, and one pass breakup. He dressed in all 18 games for the second consecutive season, starting two, in 2024, totaling seven defensive tackles, 22 special teams tackles, and one interception that he returned 48 yards for a touchdown. His 22 special teams tackles tied for the league lead that year. Allen had a workout with the Denver Broncos of the National Football League in December 2024. He dressed in all 18 games for the third straight year, starting 17, in 2025, posting 87 defensive tackles, four special teams tackles, four sacks, three forced fumbles, three interceptions for 10 yards, and five pass breakups. He led the team in tackles during the 2025 season. On November 16, 2025, Saskatchewan won the 112th Grey Cup against the Montreal Alouettes by a score of 25–17.

Allen became a free agent upon the expiry of his contract on February 10, 2026. On February 11, it was announced that he had signed a two-year contract with the Ottawa Redblacks, making him the highest-paid linebacker in the CFL's salary cap era according to 3DownNation.com. He reportedly earned $240,000 in "hard money" in 2026. Allen was benched partway through the season after defensive coordinator William Fields was fired and replaced with Jeff Reinebold. Allen dressed in 17 games overall, starting five, in 2026 while recording 30 defensive tackles, seven special teams tackles, three sacks, and one interception. The Redblacks went 1–17.
