= James Burgess (American football, born 2002) =

American gridiron football player (born 2002)

No. 27 – Saskatchewan Roughriders
- Position: Defensive back
- Roster status: Active
- CFL status: American

Personal information
- Born: February 19, 2002 (age 24)
- Listed height: 6 ft 3 in (1.91 m)
- Listed weight: 200 lb (91 kg)

Career information
- High school: Huffman (Birmingham, Alabama)
- College: Alabama State (2021–2024)
- NFL draft: 2025: undrafted

Career history
- Saskatchewan Roughriders (2026–present)

Awards and highlights
- Second-team FCS All-American (2024); First-team All-SWAC (2024)
- Stats at CFL.ca

James Burgess Jr. (born February 19, 2002) is an American professional football defensive back for the Saskatchewan Roughriders of the Canadian Football League (CFL). He played college football for the Alabama State Hornets.

== Early life ==
Burgess was born on February 19, 2002. He attended Huffman High School in Birmingham, Alabama.

== College career ==
Burgess played college football for the Alabama State Hornets from 2020 to 2024. In 40 games, he had 94 tackles, including four for loss, one sack, six interceptions, 21 pass break ups, one forced fumble and fumble recovery. As a senior, Burgess earned first-team All-SWAC and second-team FCS All-American honors.

== Professional career ==
Pre-draft measurables
Height	Weight	Arm length	Hand span	Wingspan	40-yard dash	10-yard split	20-yard split	20-yard shuttle	Three-cone drill	Vertical jump	Broad jump
6 ft 3 in (1.91 m)	188 lb (85 kg)	30 1/4 in (0.77 m)	8 5/8 in (0.22 m)	6 ft 1 1/2 in (1.87 m)	4.71 s	1.56 s	2.72 s	4.31 s	7.13 s	32.5 in (0.83 m)	10 ft 0 in (3.05 m)
All values from Pro day

On February 13, 2026, Burgess was signed by the Saskatchewan Roughriders of the Canadian Football League (CFL). On May 30, he was released by the team. On June 23, Burgess re-signed with the Roughriders. On July 31, he was elevated to the active roster and made four tackles in his CFL debut against the Edmonton Elks. On August 6, Burgess reverted to the practice roster. On August 26, he was re-signed to the active roster and made his first start on August 29 against the Toronto Argonauts. In a 28–24 win, Burgess recorded his first career interception.
