= Thomas Perry (American football) =

American football player (born 2003)

No. 69 – Saskatchewan Roughriders
- Position: Offensive tackle
- Roster status: Practice roster
- CFL status: American

Personal information
- Born: May 28, 2003 (age 23); Killingworth, Connecticut, U.S.
- Listed height: 6 ft 2 in (1.88 m)
- Listed weight: 311 lb (141 kg)

Career information
- High school: Haddam-Killingworth (CT)
- College: Middlebury Panthers (2021–2024)

Career history
- 2026–present: Saskatchewan Roughriders

Awards and highlights
- 3x All-New England Small College Athletic Conference (NESCAC) First Team; Walter Camp NCAA Division III Football All-America Team

Thomas Perry (born May 28, 2003) is an American professional football offensive tackle for the Saskatchewan Roughriders of the Canadian Football League (CFL). He played college football for the Middlebury Panthers.

== College career ==
Perry played in 34 games for the Panthers between 2021–2024, including 30 consecutive starts to finish his college career.

Perry was named to the All-New England Small College Athletic Conference (NESCAC) First Team 3 consecutive years from 2022–2024, and he also was the first Middlebury Panther to be invited to the East–West Shrine Bowl. In addition to this, he was named to the first ever Walter Camp All-American Team for Division III at the end of his senior year.

According to Brian Napier of FloFootball, Perry participated in UConn’s Pro Day on March 25, "where he put up numbers that would’ve been solid at the NFL Scouting Combine; a 29.5-inch vertical jump, 4.53 shuttle drill and 31 reps on the bench press were among his most notable marks, along with a 9–3 broad jump that would’ve put him tied for sixth among all offensive linemen at the combine."

Perry had the potential to be the first Division III football player drafted since 2020. Bleacher Reporter also ranked Perry 24th among interior linemen in the draft and a potential 5th round pick. Dane Brugler from The Athletic ranked Perry as the 11th prospect among the 70 centers in the draft. ESPN included Perry on a list of seven draft risers to watch.

== Professional career ==
Pre-draft measurables
Height	Weight	Arm length	Hand span	Wingspan
6 ft 2 3/8 in (1.89 m)	311 lb (141 kg)	31 5/8 in (0.80 m)	9 1/8 in (0.23 m)	6 ft 6 1/4 in (1.99 m)
All values from Pro Day

Perry attended minicamp with the Baltimore Ravens after going unselected in the draft.

On April 27, 2026, Perry signed with the Saskatchewan Roughriders of the Canadian Football League (CFL).
