= Lake Korte-Moore =

Canadian football player (born 1999)

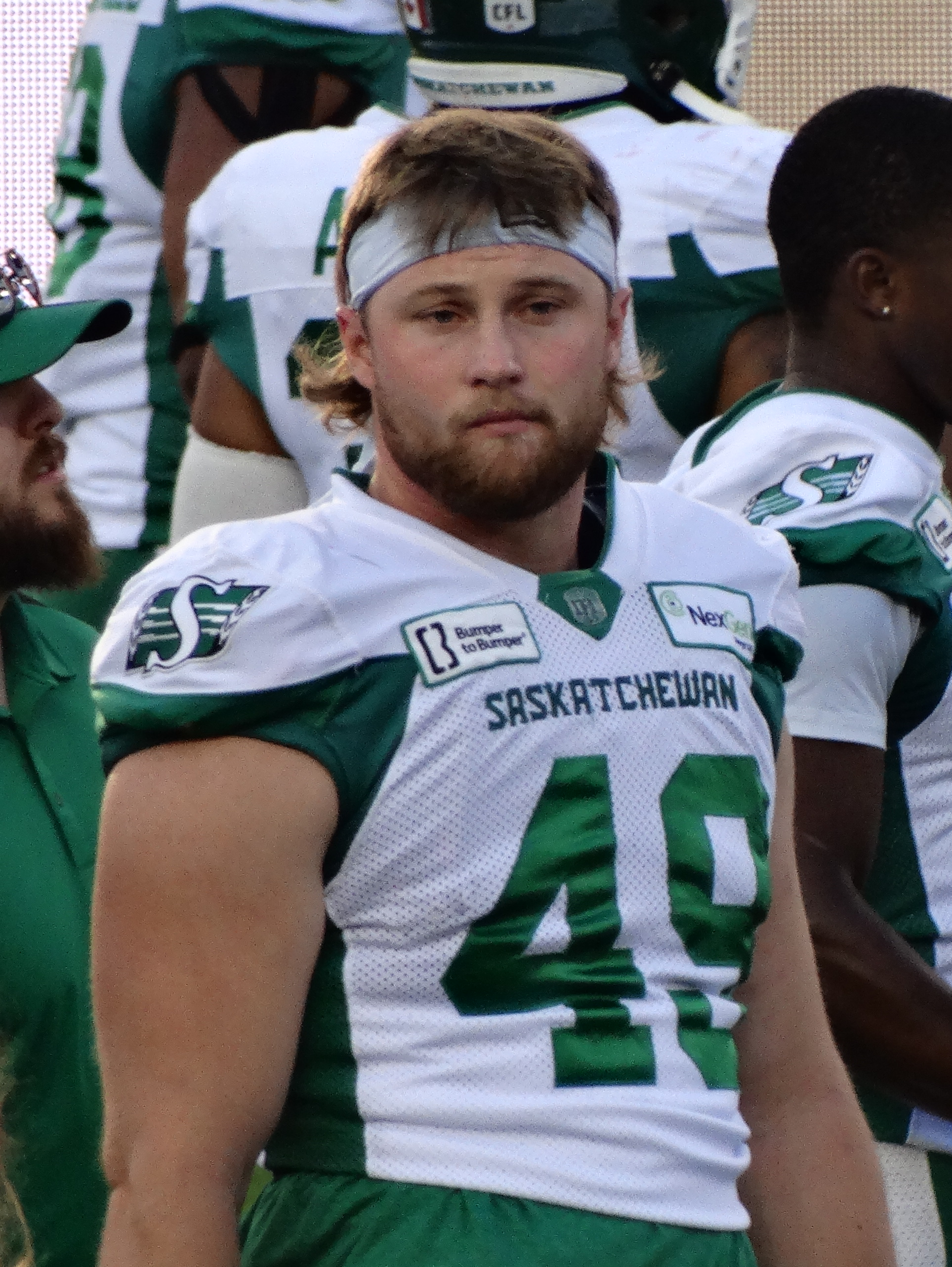
- Korte-Moore with the Saskatchewan Roughriders in 2024

No. 49 – Saskatchewan Roughriders
- Position: Defensive lineman
- Roster status: Active
- CFL status: Canadian

Personal information
- Born: November 17, 1999 (age 26); Ottawa, Ontario, Canada
- Listed height: 6 ft 4 in (1.93 m)
- Listed weight: 262 lb (119 kg)

Career information
- High school: Immaculata (ON)
- University: UBC (2018–2022)
- CFL draft: 2023: 1st round, 3rd overall pick

Career history
- 2023–present: Saskatchewan Roughriders

Awards and highlights
- Grey Cup champion (2025)
- Stats at CFL.ca

Lake Korte-Moore (born November 17, 1999) is a Canadian professional football defensive lineman for the Saskatchewan Roughriders of the Canadian Football League (CFL). He played U Sports football for the UBC Thunderbirds.

== Early life ==
Korte-Moore was born on November 17, 1999, in Ottawa, Ontario. His grandfather, George Moore, played several seasons for the Winnipeg Blue Bombers. He grew up competing in skiing events, first trying the sport out at age two. He was a member of Team Ontario and competed at several international events at a young age. He also began playing football at age six, continuing in both sports throughout his time at Ottawa's Immaculata High School. Korte-Moore was a member of the national football team and by Grade 12 began mainly focusing on football.

== University career ==
Korte-Moore entered the University of British Columbia in 2018 and began playing for their Thunderbirds football team. He totaled 16 tackles and an interception while playing nine games in his first year. In 2019, he appeared in eight games and posted 19 tackles, a sack and another interception before the 2020 season was cancelled due to the COVID-19 pandemic. Korte-Moore had 27 tackles, including five for-loss, as well as two sacks while playing seven games in 2021. In his final year, 2022, he had career-highs with 48 tackles, 12.5 TFLs and six sacks, being named a Canada west all-star. He finished his university career with 110 total tackles, 10 sacks and two interceptions in 34 games.

== Professional career ==
Pre-draft measurables
Height	Weight	40-yard dash	20-yard shuttle	Three-cone drill	Vertical jump	Broad jump	Bench press
6 ft 3 3/4 in (1.92 m)	264 lb (120 kg)	5.04 s	4.55 s	7.71 s	35.0 in (0.89 m)	9 ft 7 3/4 in (2.94 m)	18 reps
All values from CFL Combine

Ranked the top U Sports prospect for the 2023 CFL draft, Korte-Moore was chosen third overall by the Saskatchewan Roughriders. He made the team's opening day roster and made his professional debut on June 11, 2023, against the Edmonton Elks. He played in all 18 regular season games in 2023 where he recorded 13 defensive tackles, two special teams tackles, and one sack.
