= Caleb Sanders =

American gridiron football player (born 2000)

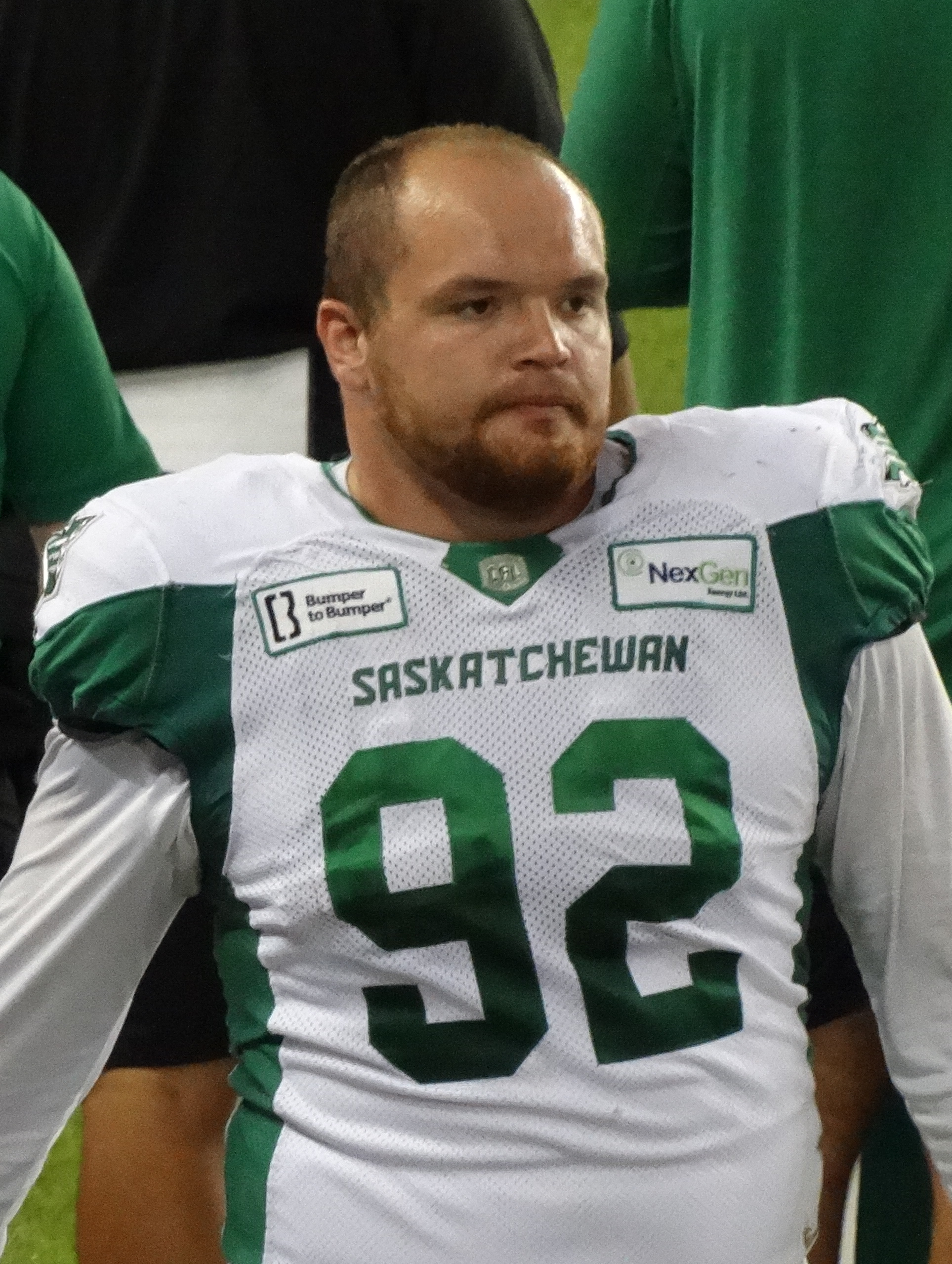
- Sanders with the Saskatchewan Roughriders in 2024

No. 92 – Saskatchewan Roughriders
- Position: Defensive lineman
- Roster status: Active
- CFL status: American

Personal information
- Born: May 18, 2000 (age 26)
- Listed height: 6 ft 1 in (1.85 m)
- Listed weight: 270 lb (122 kg)

Career information
- High school: Glenwood (Glenwood, Iowa)
- College: South Dakota State (2018–2022)
- NFL draft: 2023: undrafted

Career history
- Philadelphia Eagles (2023)*; Saskatchewan Roughriders (2023–present)
- * Offseason or practice squad member only

Awards and highlights
- Grey Cup champion (2025); FCS national champion (2022); 2× First-team All-MVFC (2020, 2022); Second-team All-MVFC (2021)

Career CFL statistics as of 2025
- Total tackles: 27
- Sacks: 5
- Forced fumbles: 1
- Stats at CFL.ca

Caleb Sanders (born May 5, 2000) is an American professional football defensive lineman for the Saskatchewan Roughriders of the Canadian Football League (CFL). He played college football for the South Dakota State Jackrabbits and also had a stint with the Philadelphia Eagles of the National Football League (NFL).

== College career ==
Sanders played college football for the South Dakota State Jackrabbits from 2018 to 2022. He played in 66 games where he had 137 total tackles, 20.5 sacks, two pass breakups, one forced fumble, and one fumble recovery. He was a first-team All-American and a finalist for the Buck Buchanan Award as a senior in 2022.

== Professional career ==
Pre-draft measurables
Height	Weight	Arm length	Hand span	Wingspan	40-yard dash	10-yard split	20-yard split	20-yard shuttle	Three-cone drill	Vertical jump	Broad jump	Bench press
6 ft 0 3/8 in (1.84 m)	287 lb (130 kg)	31 in (0.79 m)	8 7/8 in (0.23 m)	6 ft 4 1/8 in (1.93 m)	4.99 s	1.72 s	2.75 s	4.54 s	7.27 s	35.5 in (0.90 m)	9 ft 0 in (2.74 m)	31 reps
All values from Pro Day

=== Philadelphia Eagles ===
Sanders signed with the Philadelphia Eagles of the National Football League (NFL) on August 19, 2023. He was later waived on August 29, 2023.

=== Saskatchewan Roughriders ===
On September 12, 2023, it was announced that Sanders had signed with the Saskatchewan Roughriders. After being activated from the practice squad October 6, 2023, he played in one game on October 7, 2023 against the Hamilton Tiger-Cats, where he had two tackles. On October 23, 2023 he was released from the practice squad. On December 4, 2023, it was announced that Sanders had signed again with the Roughriders. On July 19, 2024, in a game against the Winnipeg Blue Bombers he recorded his first sack of his CFL career. He was placed on one-game injured reserve on July 24, 2024. On August 2, 2024 he was activated from Injured Reserve. In his next game against the Ottawa Redblacks on August 8, 2024, he blocked a 38-yard field goal attempt from Lenis Ward and finished with a tackle for loss. On November 9, 2024 during the 2024 Western Final game against the Winnipeg Blue Bombers, blocked a punt by Jamieson Sheahan, that set up a field goal for the Roughriders. He appeared in 13 games totaling 11 tackles and three sacks.
