= Jaxon Ford =

Canadian gridiron football player (born 2000)

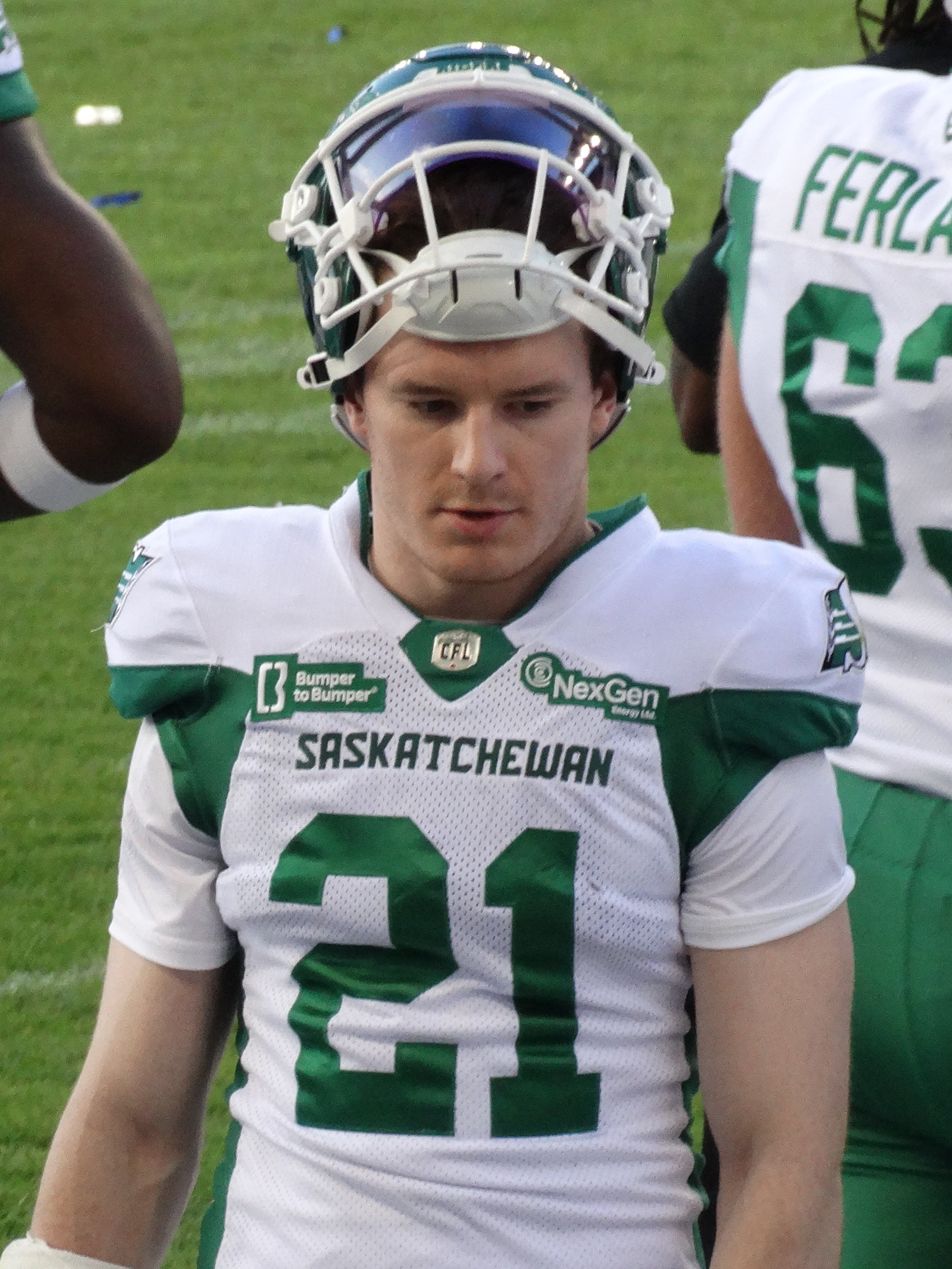
- Ford with the Saskatchewan Roughriders in 2025

No. 21 – Saskatchewan Roughriders
- Position: Defensive back
- Roster status: Active
- CFL status: National

Personal information
- Born: August 24, 2000 (age 26); Regina, Saskatchewan, Canada
- Listed height: 6 ft 0 in (1.83 m)
- Listed weight: 210 lb (95 kg)

Career information
- University: Regina
- CFL draft: 2023: 2nd round, 11th overall pick

Career history
- 2023–present: Saskatchewan Roughriders

Awards and highlights
- Grey Cup champion (2025)
- Stats at CFL.ca

Jaxon Ford (born August 24, 2000) is a Canadian professional football defensive back for the Saskatchewan Roughriders of the Canadian Football League (CFL).

== University career ==
Ford played U Sports football for the Regina Rams. He played in 29 games where he recorded 130 defensive tackles, including 10.5 for a loss, one sack, five interceptions, 11 pass knockdowns, two forced fumbles, two fumble recoveries, and one blocked kick.

== Professional career ==
Pre-draft measurables
| Height | Weight | 40-yard dash | 20-yard shuttle | Three-cone drill | Vertical jump | Broad jump | Bench press |
|---|---|---|---|---|---|---|---|
| 5 ft 11 7/8 in (1.83 m) | 199 lb (90 kg) | 4.68 s | 4.21 s | 6.94 s | 36.0 in (0.91 m) | 9 ft 11 5/8 in (3.04 m) | 6 reps |
All values from CFL Combine

Ford was selected in the second round, eleventh overall, in the 2023 CFL National Draft by the Saskatchewan Roughriders. In 2023, he played in 15 regular season games where he had 12 defensive tackles, six special teams tackles, and one pass knockdown. In the 2024 season, Ford played in just six games, while being limited due to injury, where he played in six games and recorded two special teams tackles.

== Personal ==
Ford's grandfather is Alan Ford, a former player and executive in the CFL.
