= Marcus Sayles =

American gridiron football player (born 1994)

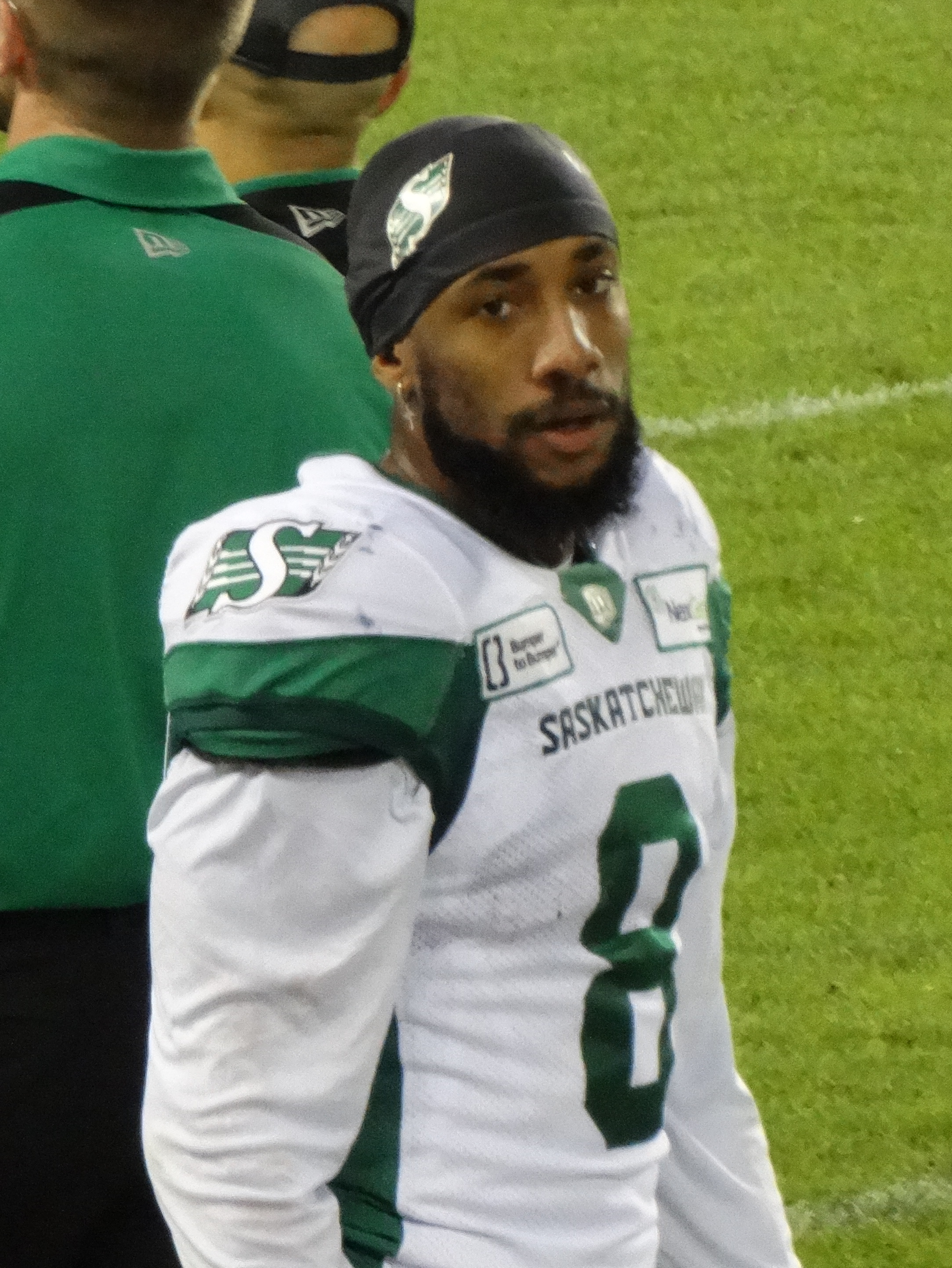
- Sayles with the Saskatchewan Roughriders in 2024

No. 8 – Saskatchewan Roughriders
- Position: Defensive back
- Roster status: Active
- CFL status: American

Personal information
- Born: October 1, 1994 (age 32); Alpharetta, Georgia, U.S.
- Listed height: 5 ft 9 in (1.75 m)
- Listed weight: 180 lb (82 kg)

Career information
- High school: Chattahoochee (Johns Creek, Georgia)
- College: West Georgia
- NFL draft: 2017: undrafted

Career history
- Buffalo Bills (2017)*; Los Angeles Rams (2017–2018)*; Winnipeg Blue Bombers (2018–2019); Minnesota Vikings (2020)*; BC Lions (2021–2023); Saskatchewan Roughriders (2024–present)
- * Offseason or practice squad member only

Awards and highlights
- 2× Grey Cup champion (2019, 2025); 2× CFL All-Star (2022, 2024); 3× CFL West All-Star (2019, 2022, 2024)
- Stats at Pro Football Reference
- Stats at CFL.ca

Marcus Sayles (born October 1, 1994) is an American professional football defensive back for the Saskatchewan Roughriders of the Canadian Football League (CFL).

== College career ==
Sayles played college football for the West Georgia Wolves from 2013 to 2016. He started in 46 games where he had 123 tackles, 12 interceptions, and 24 pass breakups. He also set the program record for most career blocked kicks with 13.

== Professional career ==
Pre-draft measurables
Height	Weight	Arm length	Hand span	Wingspan	40-yard dash	10-yard split	20-yard split	20-yard shuttle	Three-cone drill	Vertical jump	Broad jump	Bench press
5 ft 9 1/4 in (1.76 m)	177 lb (80 kg)	30 in (0.76 m)	9 5/8 in (0.24 m)	6 ft 0 in (1.83 m)	4.50 s	1.45 s	2.56 s	4.06 s	6.56 s	40.0 in (1.02 m)	11 ft 0 in (3.35 m)	15 reps
All values from Pro Day

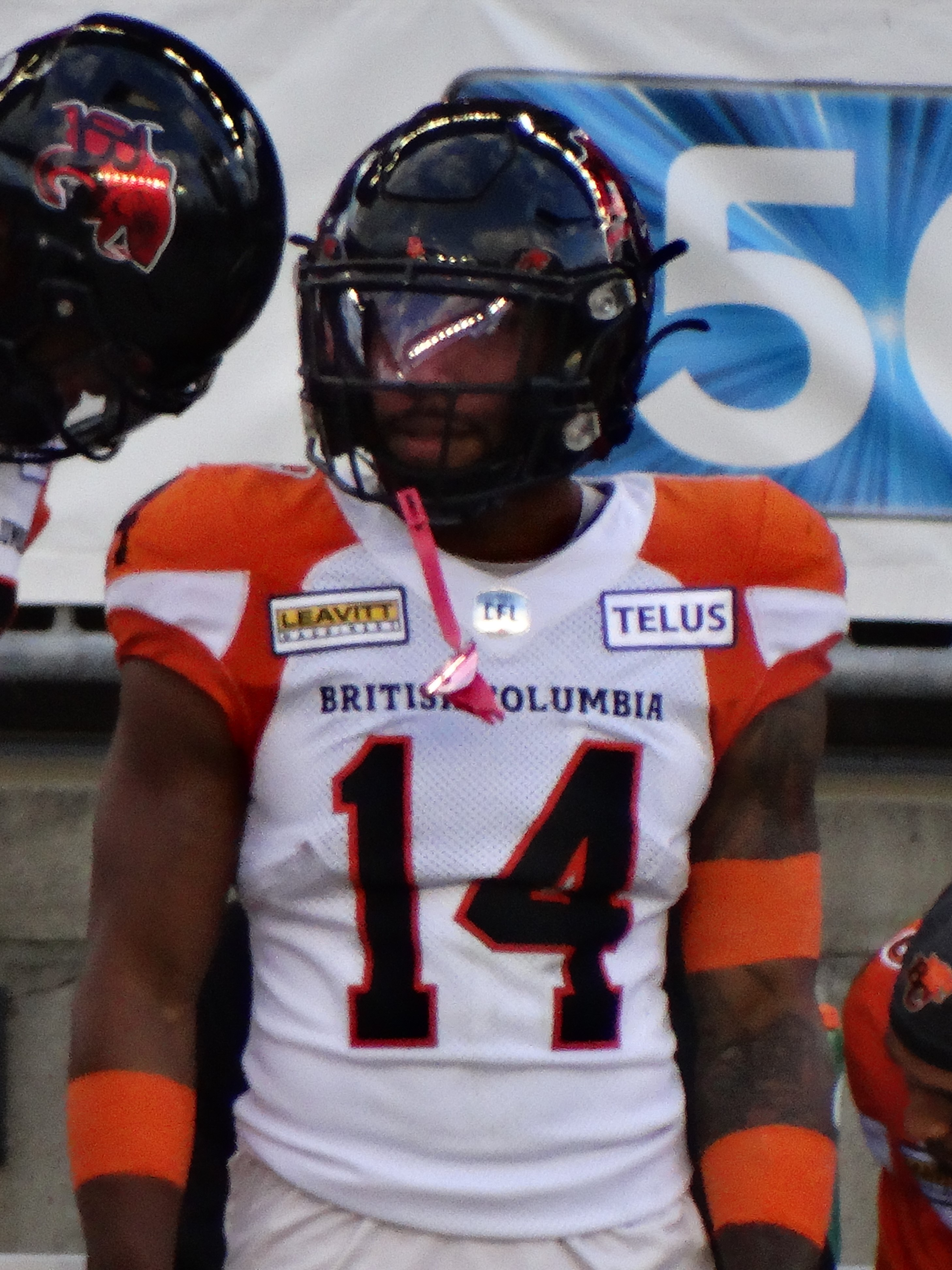
Sayles with the BC Lions in 2022

=== Buffalo Bills ===
Sayles signed with the Buffalo Bills as an undrafted free agent on May 5, 2017. He was waived on September 2, 2017, and was signed to the Bills' practice squad the next day. He was released on September 5, 2017.

=== Los Angeles Rams ===
On November 22, 2017, Sayles was signed to the Los Angeles Rams' practice squad. He was released on December 5, 2017, but was re-signed on December 13. He signed a reserve/future contract with the Rams on January 8, 2018.

On April 12, 2018, Sayles was waived by the Rams.

=== Winnipeg Blue Bombers ===
After being let go by the Rams, Sayles signed with the Winnipeg Blue Bombers for the 2018 season. Sayles played a critical role at halfback for the Bombers defense and linked up with Winston Rose as his boundary corner in 2019, to help the Bombers win the 107th Grey Cup 33–12. Sayles was named a CFL West All-Star for his play during the 2019 season.

=== Minnesota Vikings ===
On January 3, 2020, Sayles signed a reserve/future contract with the Minnesota Vikings. He was waived on August 18, 2020. He was re-signed to their practice squad on October 27, 2020. He was released on December 1, 2020.

=== BC Lions ===
On January 9, 2021, it was announced that Sayles had signed with the BC Lions to a three-year contract. In his first year with the team, he had played in 13 games where he had 52 defensive tackles, two special teams tackles, two sacks, two interceptions, and one forced fumble.

On February 3, 2024, the Lions announced that Sayles had signed a two-year contract extension.

On June 2, 2024, Sayles was released by Lions.

=== Saskatchewan Roughriders ===
On June 4, 2024, Sayles was signed by the Saskatchewan Roughriders.
