= Jacob Brammer =

American gridiron football player (born 1998)

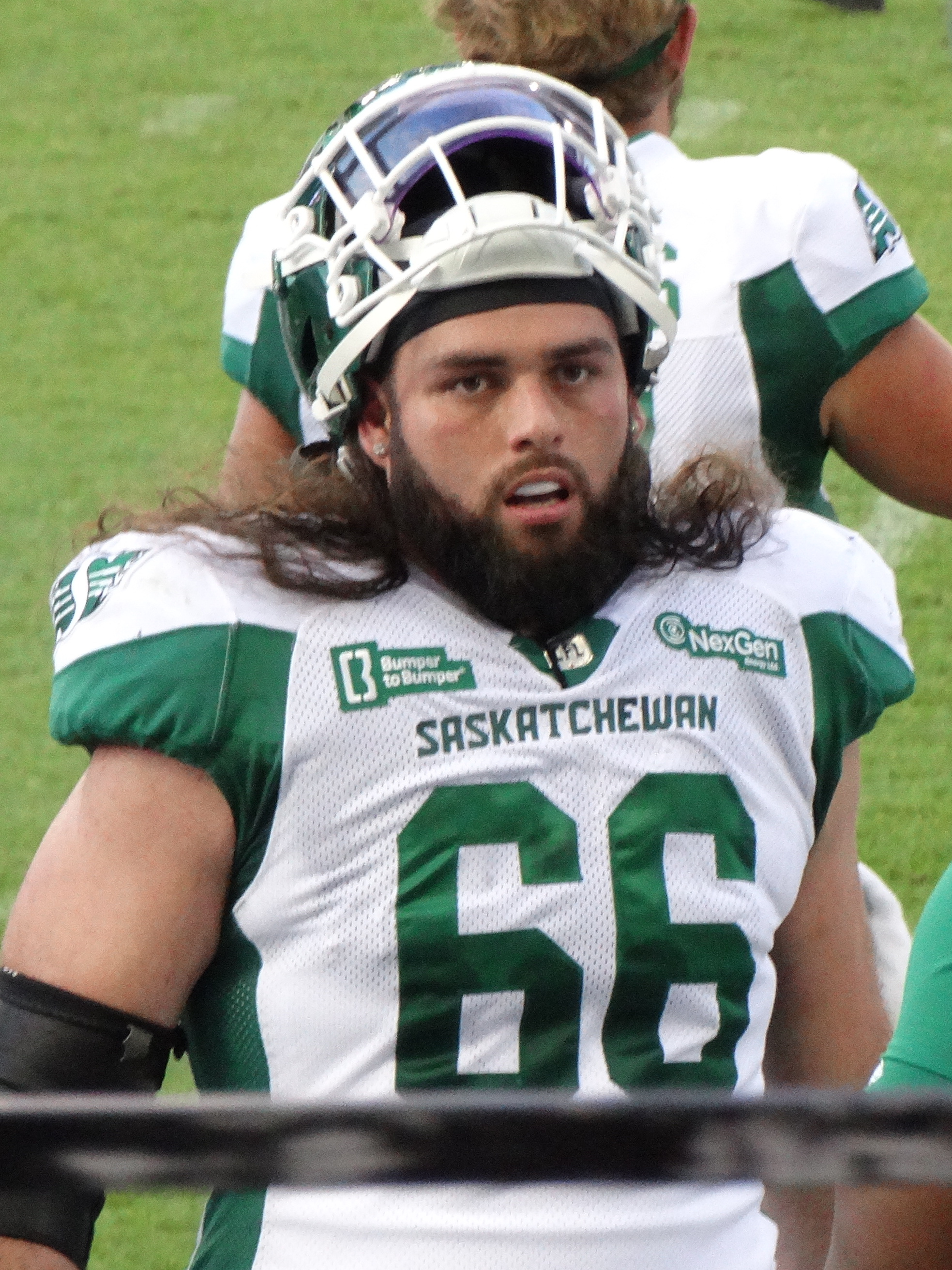
- Brammer with the Saskatchewan Roughriders in 2025

No. 66 – Saskatchewan Roughriders
- Position: Offensive lineman
- Roster status: Active
- CFL status: American

Personal information
- Born: February 18, 1999 (age 27); Richmond, Texas, U.S.
- Listed height: 6 ft 4 in (1.93 m)
- Listed weight: 301 lb (137 kg)

Career information
- High school: Foster (Richmond)
- College: North Texas (2017–2021); Vanderbilt (2022)
- NFL draft: 2023: undrafted

Career history
- Saskatchewan Roughriders (2024–present)

Awards and highlights
- Grey Cup champion (2025); CFL All-Star (2025); CFL West All-Star (2025); Second-team All-Conference USA (2020)
- Stats at CFL.ca

Jacob Brammer (born February 18, 1999) is an American professional football offensive lineman for the Saskatchewan Roughriders of the Canadian Football League (CFL). He played college football at North Texas and Vanderbilt.

== Early life ==
Brammer played high school football at John and Randolph Foster High School in Richmond, Texas as an offensive lineman and punter.

== College career ==
Brammer played college football for the North Texas Mean Green from 2018 to 2021. He was redshirted in 2017. He played in seven games, starting four, in 2018. He started the first nine games of the 2019 season before becoming injured. Brammer started all ten games of the COVID-19 shortened 2020 season, earning second-team All-Conference USA honors. He started all 13 games in 2021, garnering honorable mention All-Conference USA recognition.

Brammer transferred to play for the Vanderbilt Commodores in 2022. He appeared in all 12 games, starting 11, during the 2022 season, and was also named to the SEC first year academic honor roll.

== Professional career ==
Pre-draft measurables
Height	Weight	Arm length	Hand span	Wingspan	40-yard dash	10-yard split	20-yard split	20-yard shuttle	Three-cone drill	Vertical jump	Broad jump	Bench press
6 ft 4 1/8 in (1.93 m)	297 lb (135 kg)	31 3/4 in (0.81 m)	9 in (0.23 m)	6 ft 5 1/2 in (1.97 m)	5.18 s	1.83 s	3.01 s	4.79 s	8.24 s	29.5 in (0.75 m)	9 ft 0 in (2.74 m)	28 reps
All values from Pro Day

After going undrafted in the 2023 NFL draft, Brammer attended rookie minicamp with the New York Giants on a tryout basis. In August 2023, he was selected by the St. Louis Battlehawks in the XFL combine rights draft.

Brammer was signed by the Saskatchewan Roughriders of the Canadian Football League (CFL) on December 22, 2023. He was moved to the practice roster on June 1, 2024. He was promoted to the active roster on July 18, and made his first CFL start on July 19 after an injury to Jermarcus Hardrick. For his performance in his CFL debut, Brammer was named to Pro Football Focus' CFL Honour Roll for Week 7. On July 31, he suffered a hamstring injury during practice and was placed on the one-game injured list on August 2. He was later transferred to the six-game injured list on August 8.
