= 112th Grey Cup =

2025 Canadian Football championship game

Saskatchewan Roughriders	Montreal Alouettes
(12–6)	(10–8)
25	17
Head coach: Corey Mace	Head coach: Jason Maas
	1	2	3	4	Total
Saskatchewan Roughriders	1	14	10	0	25
Montreal Alouettes	7	0	7	3	17
- Date: November 16, 2025
- Stadium: Princess Auto Stadium
- Location: Winnipeg
- Most Valuable Player: Trevor Harris, QB (Roughriders)
- Most Valuable Canadian: Samuel Emilus, WR (Roughriders)
- Favourite: Roughriders by 3 1/2
- National anthem: Catie St. Germain
- Coin toss: Mark Carney and Lucas Matheson
- Referee: Andre Proulx
- Halftime show: MGK
- Attendance: 32,343

Broadcasters
- Network: Canada (English): CTV, TSN; Canada (French): RDS; U.S. (English): CBS Sports Network; Worldwide: CFL+
- Announcers: Rod Smith (TSN play-by-play); Glen Suitor (TSN analyst); Claire Hanna (TSN sideline reporter); Matthew Scianitti (TSN sideline reporter); David Arsenault (RDS play-by-play); Pierre Vercheval (RDS analyst); Didier Orméjuste (RDS sideline reporter)
- Ratings: 4,020,000

The 112th Grey Cup was played between the East Division champion Montreal Alouettes and the West Division champion Saskatchewan Roughriders to decide the Canadian Football League (CFL) championship for the 2025 season. The game was played on November 16, 2025, at Princess Auto Stadium in Winnipeg, Manitoba, making it the fifth time that Winnipeg has hosted the Grey Cup, with the previous being in 2015. The Roughriders defeated the Alouettes 25–17 to win their fifth Grey Cup and first since 2013.

The game was nationally televised in Canada on CTV, TSN, and RDS; in the United States on CBS Sports Network; and internationally on CFL+.

== Host ==
In October 2022, it was reported that the Winnipeg Blue Bombers were bidding to host either the 2024 or 2025 Grey Cup game, with the Manitoba government offering to contribute up to $5.5 million for the bid. After the 2024 Grey Cup was awarded to the city of Vancouver and the BC Lions, it was later reported on March 3, 2023, that the Winnipeg Blue Bombers had won the right to host the 2025 Grey Cup. On March 14, 2023, it was officially announced that Winnipeg would be the host of this game. On November 4, 2025, the game was announced as a sell-out.

== Date ==
The date for this game was not initially announced and, as per the collective bargaining agreement, the league had the option of moving the start of the season up to 30 days. However, the league revealed on August 16, 2024, that this game would be played on the third Sunday of November for the fourth consecutive season, on November 16, 2025. This tied the 85th Grey Cup and 91st Grey Cup games as the earliest to be played in a calendar year.

== Entertainment ==
Canadian rock band Our Lady Peace performed the SiriusXM Kickoff show. American singer MGK performed the Bud Light halftime show and local Métis country singer Catie St. Germain (granddaughter of Ray St. Germain) performed "O Canada". MGK performed the following songs: "Starman", "Don't Wait Run Fast", "Bloody Valentine", "Lonely Road", "My Ex's Best Friend", "Vampire Diaries", and "Cliché".

== Teams ==
The game featured the Montreal Alouettes, playing in their 20th Grey Cup game, and their second in three years, and the Saskatchewan Roughriders, who were also playing in their 20th Grey Cup game but their first since 2013. The Alouettes were attempting to win their ninth championship while the Roughriders attempted to win their fifth.

=== Montreal Alouettes ===
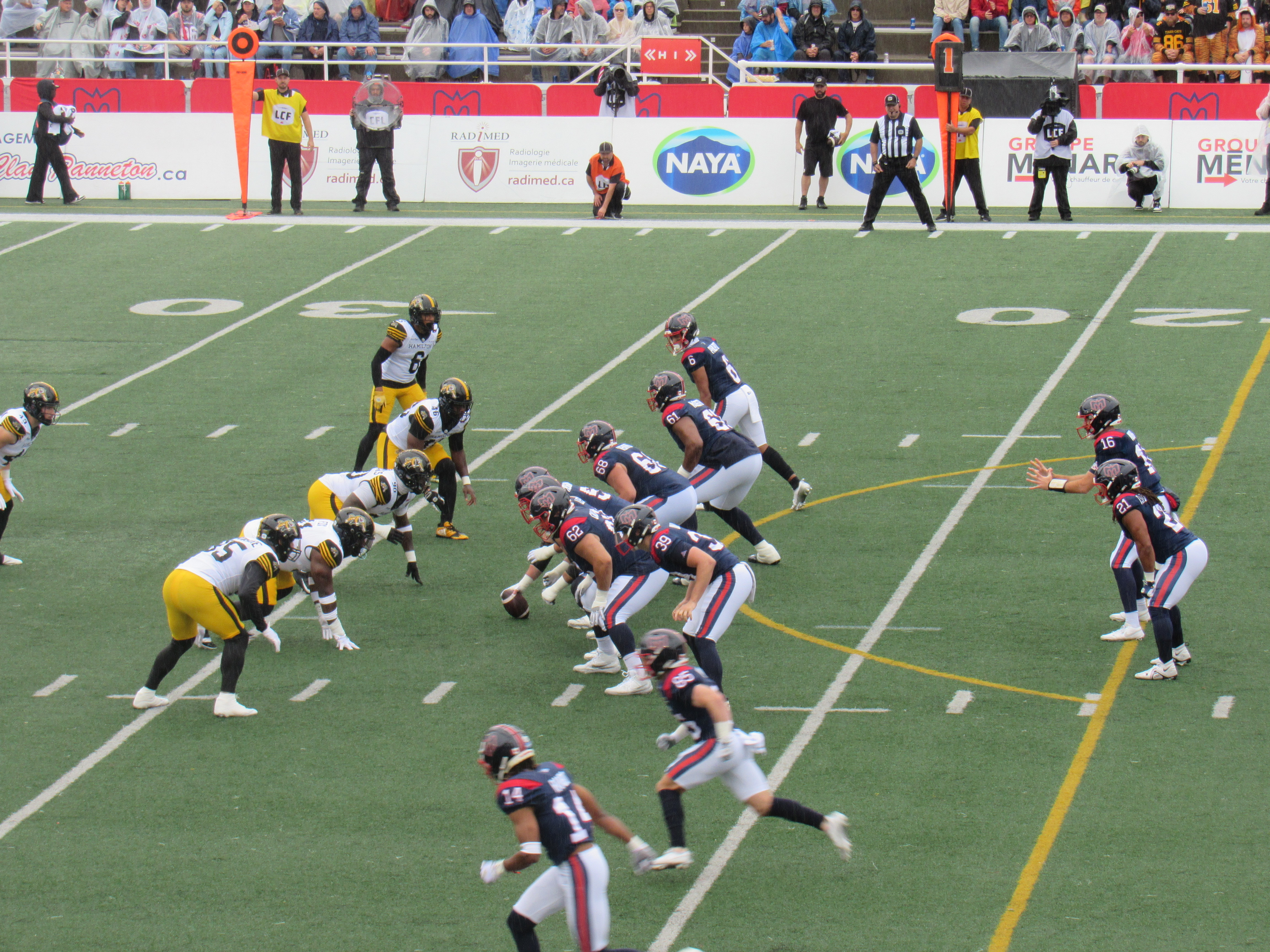
The Alouettes (in blue) during the 2025 season.

The Alouettes finished in second place in the East Division with a 10–8 record and qualified for the playoffs for the sixth consecutive year. Prior to the season, the Alouettes decided to move on from 110th Grey Cup MVP Cody Fajardo and anoint Davis Alexander as the team's starting quarterback for this season after he showed promise with a 4–0 record as a starter in 2024. Alexander rewarded the team's faith in him by leading the team to a 3–0 start to the season before suffering a hamstring injury that forced him to miss the following two games which were both losses. He returned after the team's bye week to face the Toronto Argonauts, but re-injured his hamstring on a touchdown run in the week 7 victory. Backup quarterback McLeod Bethel-Thompson started three games before also suffering an injury which led to the Alouettes starting Caleb Evans, who was injured in his start, and then fourth-stringer James Morgan who started two games amidst a five-game losing streak. With the Alouettes sitting at a 5–7 record, Bethel-Thompson returned from injury and led the team to two victories, including one against the Roughriders. Alexander then also returned from injury and won his three starts, finishing the regular season with a 7–0 record as a starter and setting a CFL record for most consecutive regular season wins to start a career with 11. Tyler Snead finished as the team's leading receiver with 1,129 yards and Darnell Sankey led the team in defensive tackles with 101. Placekicker José Carlos Maltos set a franchise record with 58 field goals in one season, which was also tied for the third-most in CFL history.

In the East Semi-Final, the Alouettes faced the Winnipeg Blue Bombers, who had been West Division champions in the previous five seasons. The Alouettes had a 19-point lead at halftime, but the Blue Bombers scored 21 straight points to make the game competitive. The Alouettes re-took the lead on a Stevie Scott touchdown, who finished the game with 18 carries for 133 yards to make the score 32–27 before Scott scored again after a Blue Bombers field goal to make the score 39–30. After exchanging field goals, the Alouettes' defence held strong to help the team to a 42–33 win. Alexander completed 24 of 34 pass attempts for 384 yards with one touchdown pass, one interception, and one touchdown run. In the East Final against the host Hamilton Tiger-Cats, the Alouettes engaged in a much more defensive contest with the teams scoring a few field goals and the Alouettes leading 6–3 at the half. With the teams locked at 16–16 with under two minutes left to play, Alexander drove the team down the field, highlighted by a Charleston Rambo 19-yard catch on second down, to set up a Maltos 45-yard field goal on the last play of the game, winning 19–16. Maltos was successful on all four of his field goal attempts and Sankey led the team with 10 defensive tackles.

=== Saskatchewan Roughriders ===
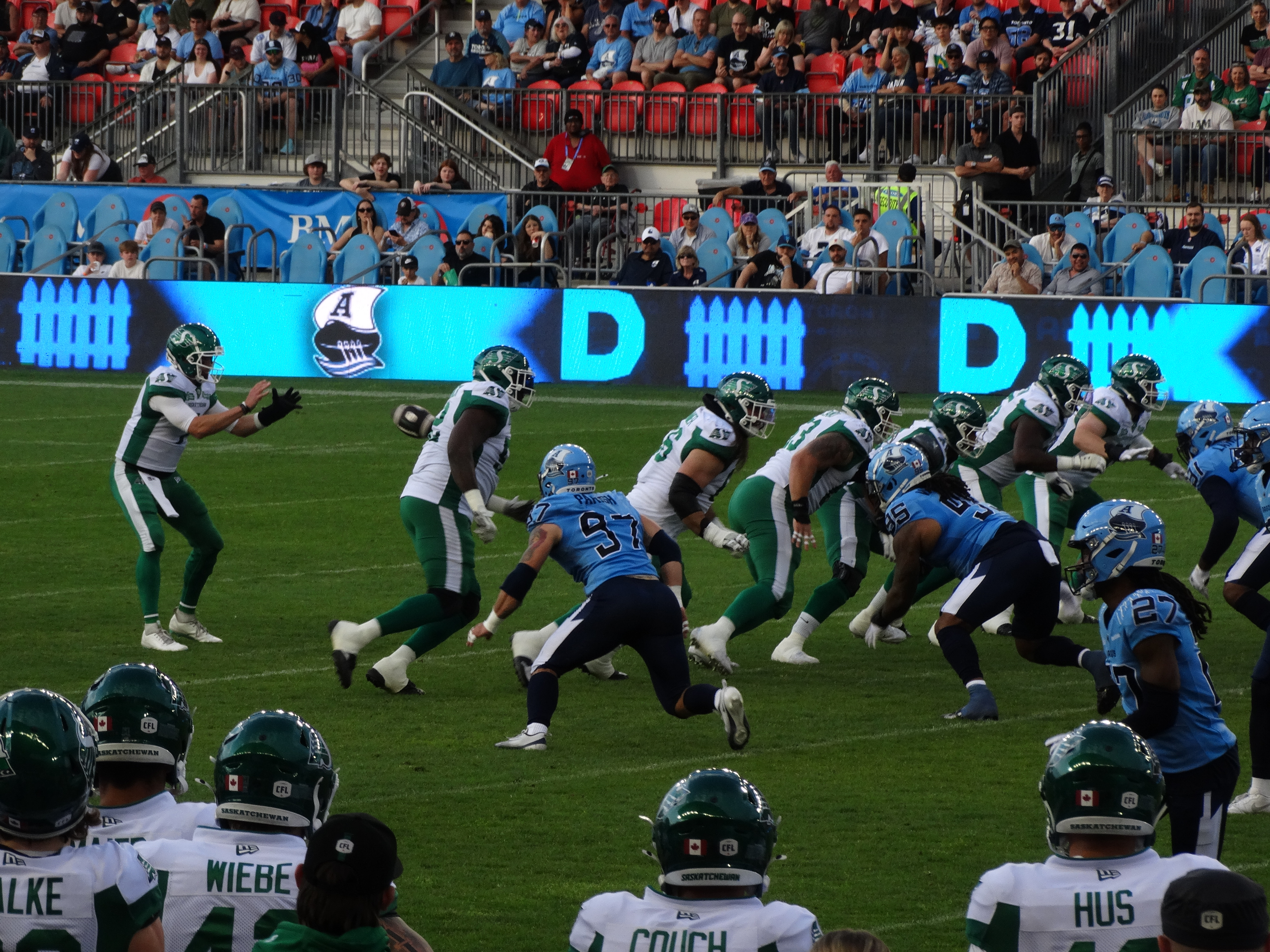
The Roughriders (in white) during the 2025 season.

The Roughriders were a dominant force during the 2025 season after starting 10–2 and coasting to a 12–6 record, which was the best in the league. The team started with four straight wins before losing to the Calgary Stampeders after their bye. After twelve games and just two losses, the team was in control of the West Division. However, the Roughriders endured injuries to the receiving corps as former 1000-yard receivers Samuel Emilus, Kian Schaffer-Baker, and Shawn Bane missed most of the season. Nonetheless, the team demonstrated their depth at the position with KeeSean Johnson and Dohnte Meyers both posting their first 1000-yard seasons. Starting quarterback Trevor Harris had 4,549 passing yards in 16 starts and running back A. J. Ouellette was a steadying force on the ground with 1,222 yards and eight touchdowns. After a slow start to the season, the team's defence was stalwart as they allowed a league-low 409 points. The Roughriders also had a league-high nine CFL All-Stars which were the most in franchise history, besting the seven selections in 1967. In their 16th game of the season, the Roughriders secured first place in the West Division for the ninth time in franchise history after their victory over the Toronto Argonauts and clinched the top record in the league for the fifth time. The team lost the last two games of the year to finish 12–6 as they rested starters in both games.

After enjoying a bye during the semi-finals, the Roughriders faced the BC Lions and league MOP Nathan Rourke. The Roughriders struggled to score in the first half with just four points as the Lions led 7–4 at halftime. Saskatchewan took the lead on a touchdown reception by Schaffer-Baker in the third quarter and a Marcus Sayles interception helped to secure the third-quarter shutout as the Roughriders led 14–7 entering the fourth. The Lions responded with touchdowns on both of their possessions to start the fourth quarter to take the lead 21–14. With under three minutes to play, head coach Corey Mace opted for a Brett Lauther field goal facing third and goal from the five-yard line. The Roughriders were able to hold the Lions to a set of two-and-outs and Harris led the team on a 76-yard scoring drive capped by a Tommy Nield three-yard touchdown catch with 11 seconds left to play with a 24–21. The Lions were unable to move the ball and the Roughriders won their first West Final since 2013. Notably, the Roughriders have won the Grey Cup after finishing first place in their division just once in their history, in 1966.

=== Head-to-head ===
The two teams split their two regular season meetings in 2025 with the Roughriders winning 34–6 on August 2 in Montreal, and the Alouettes returned the favour on September 13, when they defeated the Roughriders 48–31 in Regina. In their first meeting, Trevor Harris completed 19 of 27 passes for 289 yards and two touchdowns with Dohnte Meyers recording five catches for 136 yards. Saskatchewan's defence was dominant as they allowed just 169 yards of offence by Montreal and they recorded three takeaways. The Alouettes started backup McLeod Bethel-Thompson who had 15 completions on 26 pass attempts for 126 yards and an interception. In the second meeting, the Alouettes were riding a five-game losing streak, but their offence exploded as Bethel-Thompson completed 21 of 27 pass attempts for 369 yards and three touchdowns. Receiver Tyson Philpot had the second-most single-game receiving yards in Montreal history as he had 238 receiving yards along with two touchdowns. Saskatchewan's Harris was 23 of 32 on pass attempts for 252 yards with one touchdown pass and one interception before giving way to backup Jake Maier with the Alouettes leading by three touchdowns. Harris played his former team, as he was the starter with the Alouettes in 2021 and 2022 and faced his former teammate, Davis Alexander, who was a rookie in 2022.

This was the third Grey Cup meeting between the two teams with the other contests occurring in 2009 and 2010 which were both wins for the Alouettes. The Alouettes also defeated the Roughriders in their lone playoff meeting in the 2005 East Semi-Final as Saskatchewan was the crossover team that year. Including the 1931 Grey Cup, where the Roughriders lost to the Montreal AAA Winged Wheelers, the Roughriders had yet to defeat a team from Montreal in the post-season to this point.

=== Uniforms ===
While the home team and first choice of uniform had been traditionally assigned to the divisional champion of the host team's division, the league altered their formula for this Grey Cup game due to West Division teams hosting four straight Grey Cups (2024 to 2027). Instead, the home team designation will alternate every year, with the East Division champion getting the home locker room and first choice of uniform in this year's game. The Alouettes chose to wear their standard navy blue jerseys with navy blue pants while the Roughriders chose to wear their standard white jerseys with green pants.

== Game summary ==
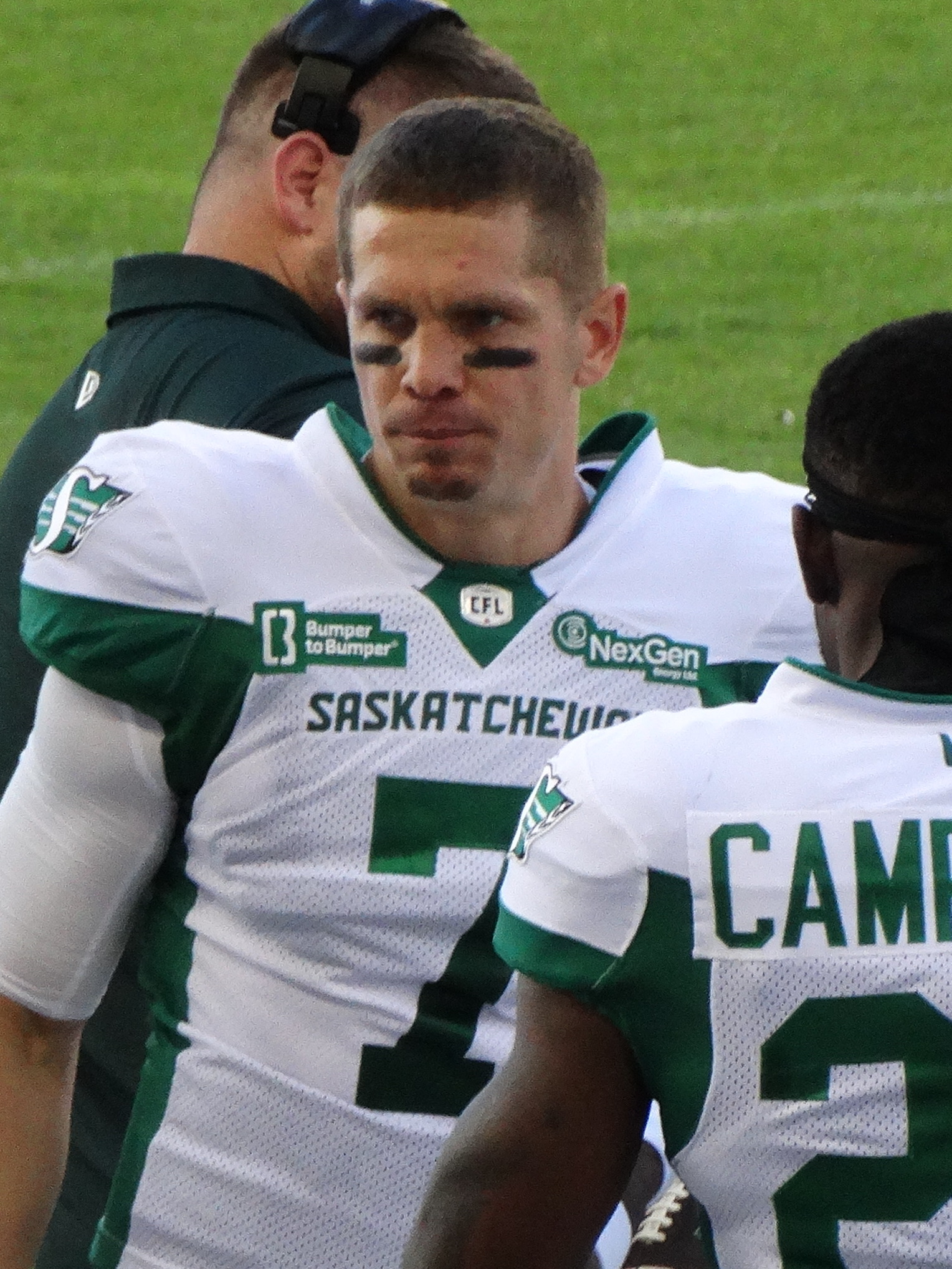
Trevor Harris was the game's MVP.

After winning the coin toss, the Saskatchewan Roughriders elected to defer to the second half and the Montreal Alouettes began with the first possession. The Alouettes began moving the ball, but on the third play, Davis Alexander threw a deep pass intended for Tyson Philpot that was intercepted by Marcus Sayles and he returned the ball to the Roughrider 38-yard line. Saskatchewan's ensuing drive stalled at Montreal's 53-yard line where Jesse Mirco punted 69 yards to the Alouettes' end zone for a single to open the scoring. The teams exchanged punts on their next possessions before an Alouettes drive that began in Roughrider territory saw Alexander complete a 37-yard pass to Philpot to bring the team down to the Saskatchewan 16-yard line. After driving down to the Saskatchewan 1-yard line, Shea Patterson was able to sneak into the endzone on third down for the Alouettes' touchdown to make the score 7–1. On Saskatchewan's following possession, Trevor Harris completed a 29-yard pass to Dohnte Meyers to bring the Roughriders into Alouettes territory and end the first quarter.

In the second quarter, Harris completed a short pass to Samuel Emilus who gained 21 yards after the catch to bring the ball down to the Alouette 12-yard line. After an A. J. Ouellette 5-yard run and an Emilus 3-yard catch, the Roughriders faced 3rd and two from the Montreal 4-yard line. Rather than attempt a field goal, head coach Corey Mace elected to run another play where Harris' pass intended for Meyers fell incomplete at the goal line. However, Mace challenged the play for pass interference by Kabion Ento, which was successful, and on the next play, Tommy Stevens and the short yardage team converted the one-yard touchdown. After an Alouettes' two-and-out, Saskatchewan began their drive at their own 18-yard line and proceeded to march the ball down the field, highlighted by an Ouellette 32-yard catch and run that brought the ball down to the Alouette 18-yard line. After Stevens converted a 3rd and one to get the ball down to the 4-yard line, Ouellette ran the ball into the endzone for a touchdown on the following play to give the Roughriders a 15–7 lead. The Alouettes could only move the ball 27 yards to the Roughrider 51-yard line, where they were forced to punt, which was returned by Saskatchewan to their own 23-yard line. After a first down, the Roughriders again had to punt, giving the Alouettes one more possession before the end of the half. Despite an injured hamstring, Alexander ran 10 yards to the Alouette 45-yard line and then completed a 14-yard pass to Cole Spieker to bring the ball to the Roughrider 51-yard line. After an incomplete pass with five seconds remaining, the Alouettes only had time for a Hail Mary pass attempt, which was intercepted by Rolan Milligan to end the half.

The Roughriders received the second half kickoff which was returned by Mario Alford into Alouettes' territory to the Montreal 48-yard line. After obtaining a first down, Harris found Tommy Nield for a 34-yard pass completion to the Montreal one-yard line. On the next play, Stevens scored his second rushing touchdown of the game and the Roughriders took a 22–7 lead. Thereafter, the teams traded two-and-outs, with Montreal beginning their following drive on their own 15-yard line. Alexander completed a 24-yard pass to Charleston Rambo to bring the ball to their own 39-yard line. Two plays later, Alexander threw his third interception of the game to Tevaughn Campbell near midfield and Saskatchewan took possession. Harris immediately completed a 17-yard pass to Emilus and, two plays later, Brett Lauther was successful on a 48-yard field goal attempt to bring the score to 25–7 for the Roughriders. Montreal began their next drive on their own 40-yard line and moved methodically up the field, highlighted by an 11-yard run by Stevie Scott, a 13-yard reception by Tyler Snead, and a 22-yard reception by Philpot. After a pass interference penalty by Campbell brought the ball to the Roughrider 11-yard line, Scott scored a rushing touchdown on the final play of the quarter with the ensuing convert cutting the lead to 25–14 for the Roughriders.

After a Roughriders' two-and-out, the Alouettes took over on their own 53-yard line and marched down the field, aided in part by an unnecessary roughness penalty by Mike Rose that brought Montreal to Saskatchewan's 11-yard line. However, following a tipped pass to Donny Ventrelli for a six-yard loss, the Alouettes opted for a 23-yard field goal attempt which was made by José Carlos Maltos. The Roughriders then took over at their own 40-yard line and Harris completed a 31-yard pass to Emilus to enter Alouettes territory. However, after an Ouellette 4-yard run and an Ajou Ajou 4-yard catch, the Roughriders were unable to secure a first down. Lauther's 39 yard field goal attempt was wide right and Travis Theis returned the ball to the Montreal 19-yard line. Alexander then completed a 15-yard pass to Rambo and then a 51-yard pass to Snead to bring the ball to Saskatchewan's 24-yard line. Scott then had an 11-yard carry and Theis caught a pass for eight yards with the ball spotted at the Roughrider 3-yard line facing a second and two. Patterson and the short yardage team came in on the following play where he rushed to the left side, but was met by Campbell who forced a fumble that was recovered by Sayles on the goal line and Saskatchewan took possession on their own 30-yard line with 2:40 left to play. Ouellette had runs of 12 yards and three yards before Harris completed a short pass to Meyers who took the ball down to the Montreal 45-yard line, but Ouellette's unnecessary roughness penalty pushed them back to the Saskatchewan 50-yard line. After failing to secure another first down, Mirco's punt to the Alouettes' 12-yard line was returned by Theis to their 23-yard line where Montreal began their drive with 57 seconds remaining. Alexander began moving the ball, including a critical third down pass to Snead for 14 yards. After two incomplete passes, he completed another third down pass to Scott to take the ball to the Saskatchewan 54-yard line. With no time remaining, Alexander attempted a final Hail Mary, which was broken up by Sayles and the Roughriders won the game.

Harris was named the Grey Cup Most Valuable Player and Emilus received the Dick Suderman Trophy for being the Most Valuable Canadian Player of the game. The Roughriders' parade was held on November 18 in Regina.

=== Scoring summary ===
First quarter

SSK – Single Mirco 69 yards (10:05) 1–0 SSK
MTL – TD Patterson 1-yard run (Maltos convert) (1:12) 7–1 MTL

Second quarter

SSK – TD Stevens 1-yard run (Lauther convert) (11:56) 8–7 SSK
SSK – TD Ouellette 4-yard run (Lauther convert) (2:39) 15–7 SSK

Third quarter

SSK – TD Stevens 1-yard run (Lauther convert) (12:12) 22–7 SSK
SSK – FG Lauther 48 yards (3:59) 25–7 SSK
MTL – TD Scott 11-yard run (Maltos convert) (00:00) 25–14 SSK

Fourth quarter

MTL – FG Maltos 23 yards (7:52) 25–17 SSK

=== Individual statistics ===
Sources: CFL 112th Grey Cup Boxscore

Alouettes passing
Player	CP/AT	Pct	Yards	TD	Int
(United States) Davis Alexander	22/34	64.7%	284	0	3
Alouettes rushing
Player	Car	Yards	Avg	Lg	TD
(United States) Stevie Scott	15	78	5.2	13	1
(United States) Davis Alexander	2	14	7.0	10	0
(United States) Shea Patterson	5	8	1.6	2	1
(United States) Travis Theis	1	5	5.0	5	0
Alouettes receiving
Player	Rec	Yards	Avg	Lg	TD
(Canada) Tyson Philpot	5	87	17.4	37	0
(United States) Tyler Snead	3	78	26.0	51	0
(United States) Charleston Rambo	4	50	12.5	24	0
(United States) Stevie Scott	3	27	9.0	15	0
(United States) Cole Spieker	3	24	8.0	14	0
(United States) Travis Theis	2	17	8.5	9	0
(United States) Alexander Hollins	1	7	7.0	7	0
(United States) Donald Ventrelli	1	–6	–6.0	–6	0
Alouettes defence
Player	DT–ST	QS	Int	FR	FF
(United States) Najee Murray	9–0	0	0	0	0
(United States) Tyrice Beverette	5–0	0	0	0	0
(United States) Robert Kennedy	5–0	0	0	0	0
(Canada) Marc-Antoine Dequoy	4–0	0	0	0	0
(United States) Lorenzo Burns	4–0	0	0	0	0
(United States) Wesley Sutton	3–1	0	0	0	0
(United States) Darnell Sankey	2–0	0	0	0	0
(United States) Kabion Ento	2–0	0	0	0	0
(United States) Kori Roberson Jr.	2–0	0	0	0	0
(Canada) Lwal Uguak	2–0	0	0	0	0
(Canada) Tyson Philpot	2–0	0	0	0	0
(United States) Austin Mack	1–0	0	0	0	0
(Canada) Geoffrey Cantin-Arku	1–0	0	0	0	0
(Canada) Isaac Adeyemi-Berglund	1–0	0	0	0	0
(United States) Mustafa Johnson	1–0	0	0	0	0
(Canada) Justin Lawrence	1–0	0	0	0	0
(Canada) Tyrell Richards	0–2	0	0	0	0
(United States) Don Callis	0–1	0	0	0	0
(Canada) Joshua Archibald	0–1	0	0	0	0
(Mexico) José Carlos Maltos	0–1	0	0	0	0
Alouettes placekicking
Player	FM–FA	Lng	Avg	Sng	CM-CA
(Mexico) José Carlos Maltos	1–1	23	23.0	0	2–2
Alouettes punting
Player	No	GAv	NAv	Sng	Lng
(Australia) Joseph Zema	5	45.0	—	0	51
Alouettes punt returns
Player	PR	Yards	Avg	Lg	TD
(United States) Travis Theis	5	48	9.6	13	0
Alouettes kickoff returns
Player	PR	Yards	Avg	Lg	TD
(United States) Travis Theis	3	65	21.7	31	0
(Canada) Tyson Philpot	1	23	23.0	23	0

Roughriders passing
Player	CP/AT	Pct	Yards	TD	Int
(United States) Trevor Harris	23/27	85.2%	302	0	0
Roughriders rushing
Player	Car	Yards	Avg	Lg	TD
(United States) A. J. Ouellette	17	83	4.9	12	1
(United States) Tommy Stevens	4	10	2.5	5	2
Roughriders receiving
Player	Rec	Yards	Avg	Lg	TD
(Canada) Samuel Emilus	10	108	10.8	31	0
(United States) Dohnte Meyers	4	76	19.0	29	0
(Canada) Tommy Nield	3	46	15.3	34	0
(United States) A. J. Ouellette	1	32	32.0	32	0
(Canada) Kian Schaffer-Baker	3	27	9.0	13	0
(Canada) Ajou Ajou	2	13	6.5	9	0
Roughriders defence
Player	DT–ST	QS	Int	FR	FF
(United States) Jameer Thurman	11–0	0	0	0	0
(Canada) A. J. Allen	6–1	0	0	0	0
(United States) Antoine Brooks Jr.	5–1	0	0	0	0
(United States) C. J. Reavis	3–0	0	0	0	0
(Canada) Tevaughn Campbell	3–0	0	1	1	0
(United States) DaMarcus Fields	3–1	0	0	0	0
(United States) Marcus Sayles	2–0	0	1	0	1
(United States) Micah Johnson	2–0	0	0	0	0
(United States) Malik Carney	2–0	0	0	0	0
(Italy) Habakkuk Baldonado	2–0	0	0	0	0
(United States) Rolan Milligan	1–0	0	1	0	0
(United States) Mike Rose	1–0	0	0	0	0
(United States) Caleb Sanders	1–1	0	0	0	0
(United States) Aubrey Miller Jr.	0–2	0	0	0	0
(Canada) Nick Wiebe	0–2	0	0	0	0
(Canada) Jaxon Ford	0–1	0	0	0	0
(Canada) Melique Straker	0–1	0	0	0	0
Roughriders placekicking
Player	FM–FA	Lng	Avg	Sng	CM-CA
(Canada) Brett Lauther	1–2	48	48.0	0	3–3
Roughriders punting
Player	No	GAv	NAv	Sng	Lng
(Australia) Jesse Mirco	6	49.3	—	1	69
Roughriders punt returns
Player	PR	Yards	Avg	Lg	TD
(United States) Mario Alford	3	29	9.7	11	0
Roughriders kickoff returns
Player	PR	Yards	Avg	Lg	TD
(United States) Mario Alford	3	92	30.7	38	0

== Depth charts ==
The following diagrams illustrate the teams' depth charts that were released one day prior to game day. Starters are listed in boxes in their respective positions with backups listed directly above or below.

=== Montreal Alouettes ===
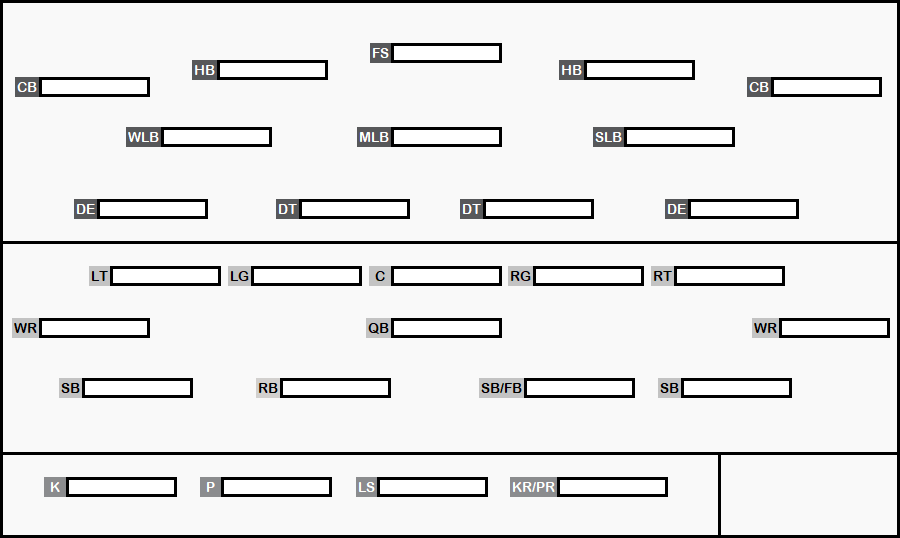

=== Saskatchewan Roughriders ===
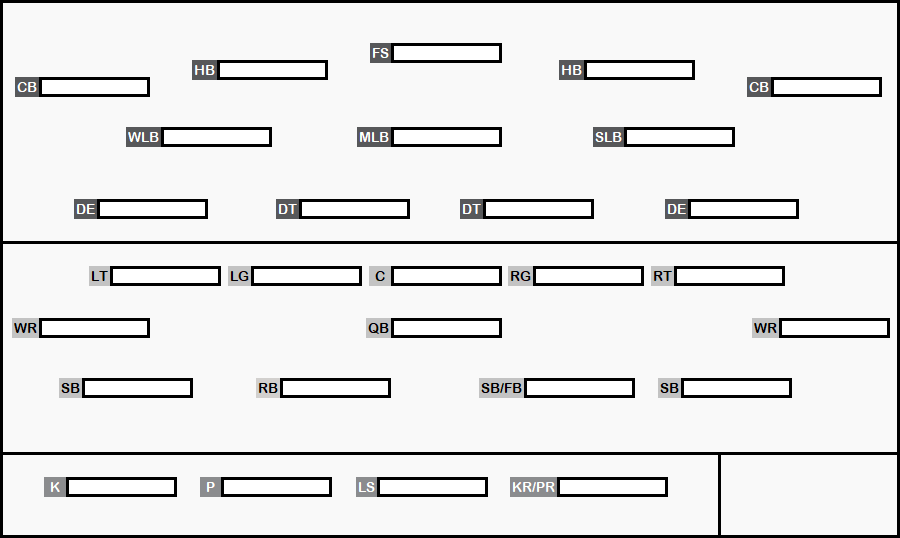

== Officials ==
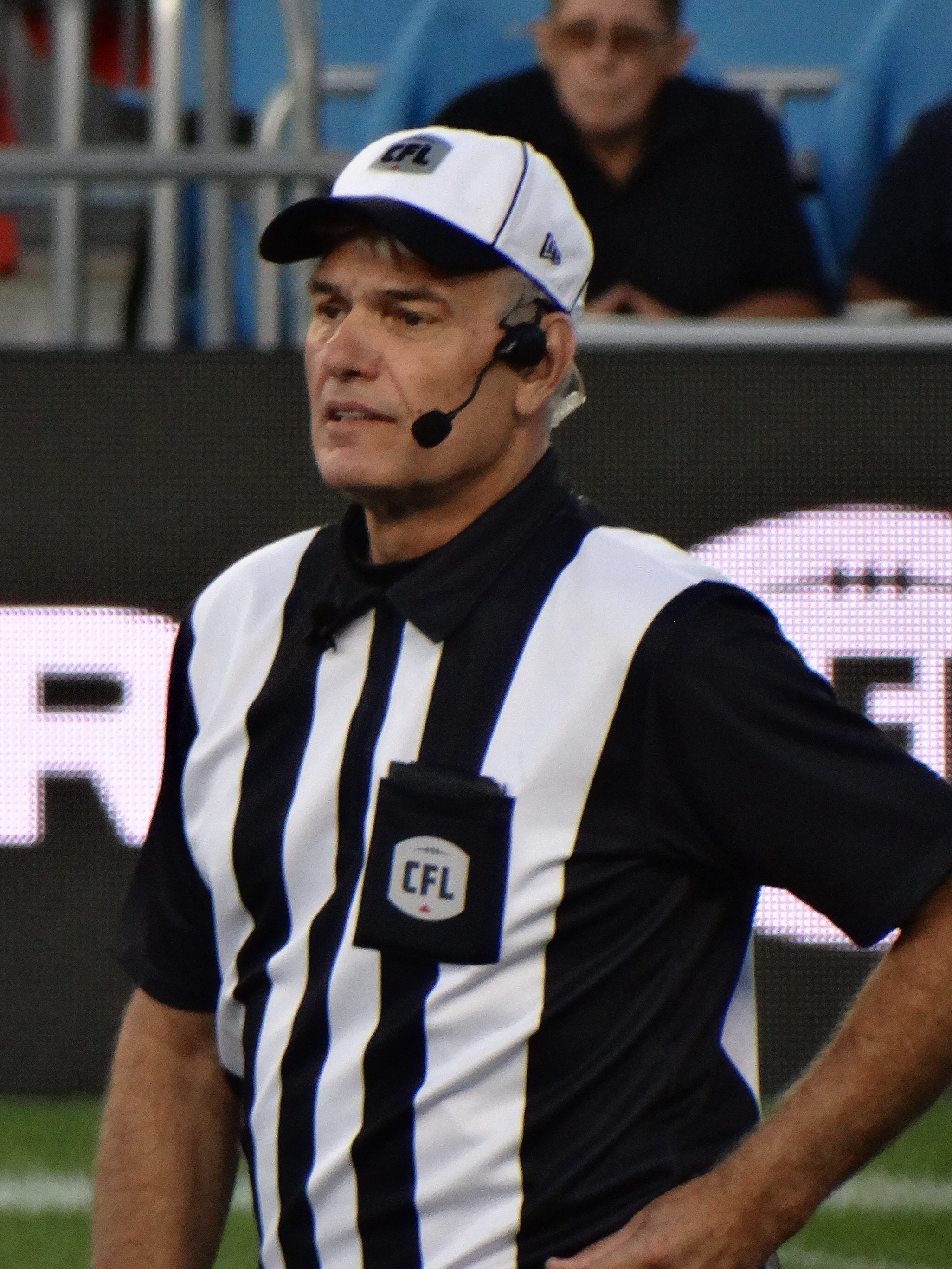
Andre Proulx was assigned to officiate his 11th Grey Cup.

The highest-rated officials during the 2025 CFL season from their respective positions were selected for the game and announced on November 14. The numbers below indicate their uniform numbers.

- Referee: No. 28 Andre Proulx
- Umpire: No. 34 Ritchie Miller
- Down Judge: No. 89 Marc Cobb
- Line Judge: No. 36 Thomas Cesari
- Side Judge: No. 75 Dave Gatza
- Back Judge: No. 40 Kevin Riopel
- Field Judge: No. 23 Jim Carlisle
- Backup Referee: No. 74 Tim Kroeker
- Backup Official: No. 24 Troy Semenchuk
- Backup Official: No. 83 Dan Mulvihill
- Backup Official: No. 73 Brian Chrupalo
