= 2023 CFL season =

Canadian Football League season

- Duration: June 8 – October 28, 2023
- East champions: Montreal Alouettes
- West champions: Winnipeg Blue Bombers

110th Grey Cup
- Date: November 19, 2023
- Venue: Tim Hortons Field, Hamilton
- Champions: Montreal Alouettes

CFL seasons
- ← 2022 2024 →

Locations of the active CFL teams West East

The 2023 CFL season was the 69th season of modern professional Canadian football. Officially, it was the 65th season of the Canadian Football League. Hamilton hosted the 110th Grey Cup on November 19, 2023. The regular season began on June 8, and ended on October 28, with 18 games played per team over 21 weeks.

== League business ==
=== Salary cap ===
According to the new collective bargaining agreement, the 2023 salary cap is set at $5,450,000 (average $121,111 per active roster spot) As per the agreement, the cap is fixed and will not vary with league revenue performance until 2024. The minimum player salary is set at $70,000.

=== Starter ratio ===
Beginning this season, teams are required to start eight National players as opposed to just seven in years prior. However, one of those players can be a "Nationalized American" player that has spent three years with the same team or five years in the CFL. Originally, the league was planning to allow teams to also have one more Nationalized American on offence and one on defence substitute up to 49% of the snaps for a National player; however, this was later changed as the total number of snaps in game cannot be accurately determined during a game. Instead, teams must indicate the designated Nationalized Americans and the designated Nationals that that player may replace for a maximum of 23 plays.

=== Scheduling ===
During his commissioner's state of the league address on November 18, 2022, Randy Ambrosie announced that the playoff games (Division Semi-Final and Division Final games) would be moved from Sundays to Saturdays, while the 110th Grey Cup game would remain on Sunday. They will be the first playoff games on Saturdays since the 2008 CFL season. The Touchdown Atlantic series continued with the Toronto Argonauts hosting the Saskatchewan Roughriders at Huskies Stadium (Saint Mary's University) in Halifax, Nova Scotia, on Saturday, July 29. This was the first regular season game held in Halifax after the city hosted a pre-season match in 2005.

In the most recent collective bargaining agreement, the league had the option of moving this season's schedule by up to 30 days earlier. However, the league decided to keep the dates consistent with previous years when the 2023 schedule was released on December 13, 2022, with the season opening game on June 8.

=== Partnership with Genius Sports ===
During the off-season the league and Genius Sports launched a new fantasy platform called 'CFL Gamezone'. In May 2023, before the pre-season, the CFL announced that it would be transitioning its stats tracking platform from New Jersey–based firm SharpHat to Genius Sports, called 'CFL LiveStats'. As the league schedule moved through the pre-season and into the regular season, the launch of the new stat tracking platform was delayed. There was no live data during games, player profiles were blank, and season/game stats were only available for download as a PDF file type. On June 22, 2023, Commissioner Randy Ambrosie addressed this issue asking for patience from fans as the league transitions. The state of the stat tracking platform and the commissioner's response were criticized by fans and the media. As of late July 2023, CFL LiveStats was not operational.

=== Rule changes ===
On May 8, the league announced a series of minor rule changes which focused on improving "health and safety and to making refinements to certain nuances in the game."

- The requirement for the ball to be touched prior to ruling a rouge on a kickoff has been removed
- A safety has been added to the options for a holding penalty in the team's own goal area
- The defensive formation has been restricted on kick plays
- Avoidable contact with an official
- Move the drive start position up five yards in additional scenarios
- Teams cannot have two players wearing 0 and 00

=== Health and safety ===
On May 16, the league announced new health and safety measures:

- Guardian caps – defensive linemen, running backs and linebackers will be required to wear a guardian cap during training camps and contact practices during the regular season.
- Medical tents – teams will have collapsible medical tents on the sidelines to allow players to be medically assessed during the game.
- Pre-game medical meeting – medical personnel, security, venue staff, and game presentation departments will have a meeting before each game to align on the medical processes should there be any issues during the game.
- Medical staff training – staff from all nine clubs gathered in the off-season to complete additional advanced professional development courses.
- Research – the league is continuing to partner with universities across the country to better understand equipment and technologies in the prevention and rehabilitation of injuries.

=== Coaching changes ===
Team	2022 HC	2022 Interim HC	2023 HC	Comments
Montreal Alouettes	Khari Jones	Danny Maciocia (GM)	Jason Maas	Khari Jones had been the head coach and offensive coordinator of the Alouettes since 2019; however, after a slow start to the 2022 season he was relieved of his duties. General Manager Danny Maciocia took over the head coaching duties. Jones won 18 games and lost 18 games in three seasons. For the remainder of the season Maciocia helped guide the Alouettes to a 8–6 record and a playoff berth. Maas was hired by Montreal on December 17, 2022. Maas had previously served as the offensive coordinator for Ottawa, Edmonton and Saskatchewan and was the head coach in Edmonton for four seasons (39–33).
Ottawa Redblacks	Paul LaPolice	Bob Dyce		LaPolice had served as the Redblacks' head coach for two seasons, winning only six games and losing 22. He was relieved of his duties on October 1, 2022. Long time assistant coach Bob Dyce was granted the role of interim head coach, a position which was made permanent on December 2, 2022. Dyce had been with the Redblacks since 2016 and served as the interim head coach in Saskatchewan during the 2015 season, winning three of nine contests.

== Player movement ==
=== Free agency ===
The 2023 free agency period officially began on February 14 at noon ET. Pending free agents and teams were able to negotiate offers for one week starting February 5 and ending February 12. All formal offers to a player during this time were sent to both the league and the players union and could not be rescinded.

== Regular season ==
=== Standings ===
The top three teams in each division advance to the playoffs, with the division winners receiving a bye to the division finals and home-field advantage for the game. The second and third place teams in each division will compete in a division semi-final to advance to the division final with the 2nd place teams in each division receiving home-field advantage. The CFL additionally employs a "crossover rule" where, if the fourth place team in one division has a better record than the third place team in the other division, the former qualifies for the playoffs, while the latter does not.

West Division
Team	GP	W	L	T	Pts	PF	PA	Div	Stk	
Winnipeg Blue Bombers	18	14	4	0	28	594	377	10–2	W4	Details
BC Lions	18	12	6	0	24	495	439	8–4	L1	Details
Calgary Stampeders	18	6	12	0	12	412	471	4–7	L1	Details
Saskatchewan Roughriders	18	6	12	0	12	387	551	5–7	L7	Details
Edmonton Elks	18	4	14	0	8	367	517	2–9	L4	Details

East Division
Team	GP	W	L	T	Pts	PF	PA	Div	Stk	
Toronto Argonauts	18	16	2	0	32	591	396	10–0	W4	Details
Montreal Alouettes	18	11	7	0	22	442	392	7–3	W5	Details
Hamilton Tiger-Cats	18	8	10	0	16	408	461	3–7	L2	Details
Ottawa Redblacks	18	4	14	0	8	415	507	0–10	L4	Details

== Postseason ==
The Grey Cup was played at Tim Hortons Field in Hamilton, Ontario, on November 19. The Montreal Alouettes upset the favoured Winnipeg Blue Bombers 28–24, to win their first Grey Cup since 2010.

=== Playoff bracket ===
November 4: Division Semi-Finals
East
E2	Montreal Alouettes	27
E3	Hamilton Tiger-Cats	12
West
W2	BC Lions	41
W3	Calgary Stampeders	30

November 11: Division Finals
E1	Toronto Argonauts	17
E2	Montreal Alouettes	38
W1	Winnipeg Blue Bombers	24
W2	BC Lions	13

November 19: 110th Grey Cup; Tim Hortons Field – Hamilton
E2	Montreal Alouettes	28
W1	Winnipeg Blue Bombers	24

== Broadcasting ==
The CFL continued to be broadcast on TSN and RDS across all platforms in Canada as part of their current contract. The broadcast rights were reported to have been extended through 2025. In late April, the CFL announced a new partnership with CBS Sports Network, who would broadcast 34 games in the United States. The deal was reportedly worth $1 million per year, with each team receiving around $100,000 in compensation. The deal replaced the former partnership with ESPN. The CFL livestreamed all games in the United States not broadcast by CBS on their own platform, dubbed CFL+, for free. A small number of preseason games were broadcast on TSN and RDS; the remainder of the normally un-broadcast preseason games (as well as all international broadcasts of the preseason games) were shown for free on a league-operated streaming platform called CFL Preseason Live.

== Award winners ==
=== CFL Honour Roll ===
Weekly Honour Roll
Week	Quarterback	Running Back	Receiver	Offensive Lineman	Defensive Lineman	Linebacker	Defensive Back	Kicker/Punter	Safety	Offensive Line
1	Zach Collaros	Brady Oliveira	Geno Lewis	Jermarcus Hardrick	Anthony Lanier II	Avery Williams	Ciante Evans	David Côté	Kyle Wilson	Winnipeg Blue Bombers
2	Zach Collaros	A.J. Ouellette	Damonte Coxie	Sukh Chungh	Julian Howsare	Titus Wall	Tre Roberson	Sean Whyte	Elliot Graham	Winnipeg Blue Bombers
3	Cody Fajardo	A.J. Ouellette	Kaion Julien-Grant	Dylan Giffen	Dewayne Hendrix	Adarius Pickett	Royce Metchie	René Paredes	Charlie Moore	Toronto Argonauts
4	Chad Kelly	De'Montre Tuggle	Cam Phillips	Chris Kolankowski	Folarin Orimolade	Douglas Coleman III	Robertson Daniel	Boris Bede	Kene Onyeka	Winnipeg Blue Bombers
5	Trevor Harris	Dedrick Mills	Mitchell Picton	Drew Desjarlais	Jackson Jeffcoat	Tyron Vrede	Marc-Antoine Dequoy	Cody Grace	Woody Baron	Saskatchewan Roughriders
6	Chad Kelly	James Butler	David Ungerer III	Pier-Olivier Lestage	James Vaughters	Micah Awe	Robertson Daniel	René Paredes	Kobe Williams	Hamilton Tiger-Cats
7	Zach Collaros	Brady Oliveira	Nate Behar	Colin Kelly	Mike Rose	Ben Hladik	Richard Leonard	Bailey Flint	Jayden Dalke	Winnipeg Blue Bombers
8	Dane Evans	A.J. Ouellette	Shawn Bane	Darius Ciraco	Woody Baron	Wynton McManis	Kabion Ento	René Paredes	Charbel Dabire	BC Lions
9	Zach Collaros	A.J. Ouellette	Kenny Lawler	Nick Callender	Willie Jefferson	Jovan Santos-Knox	Royce Metchie	Cody Grace	Gary Johnson Jr.	Winnipeg Blue Bombers
10	Dru Brown	Brady Oliveira	DaVaris Daniels	Dejon Allen	Jackson Jeffcoat	Micah Awe	Reggie Stubblefield	Cody Grace	Justin Herdman-Reed	Montreal Alouettes
11	Tre Ford	James Butler	Steven Dunbar	Tomas Jack-Kurdyla	Micah Johnson	Tyrell Richards	Demerio Houston	Jamieson Sheahan	T.J. Brunson	Edmonton Elks
12	Tre Ford	A.J. Ouellette	Nic Demski	Brandon Kemp	Casey Sayles	Wynton McManis	Marc-Antoine Dequoy	Boris Bede	Jonathan Edouard	Toronto Argonauts
13	Vernon Adams	Brady Oliveira	Nic Demski	Joel Figueroa	Miles Brown	Jordan Williams	Quincy Mauger	Brett Lauther	Kosi Onyeka	BC Lions
14	Zach Collaros	Brady Oliveira	Tim White	Martez Ivey	Lorenzo Mauldin IV	Cameron Judge	Jamal Peters	Cody Grace	Tanner Green	Winnipeg Blue Bombers
15	Dustin Crum	Kevin Brown	Justin McInnis	Peter Nicastro	Lorenzo Mauldin IV	Tyrice Beverette	Mason Pierce	Jake Julien	Nic Cross	Edmonton Elks
16	Dustin Crum	William Stanback	Dejon Brissett	Justin Lawrence	Bryce Carter	Wynton McManis	Marc-Antoine Dequoy	Adam Korsak	Jake Harty	Ottawa Redblacks
17	Vernon Adams	James Butler	Keon Hatcher	Brandon Revenberg	Casey Sayles	Cameron Judge	Qwan'tez Stiggers	Joseph Zema	Adam Auclair	BC Lions
18	Chad Kelly	Jamal Morrow	Omar Bayless	Nick Callender	Mustafa Johnson	Wynton McManis	Stavros Katsantonis	Sean Whyte	Nic Cross	Winnipeg Blue Bombers
19	Vernon Adams	Walter Fletcher	Alexander Hollins	Martez Ivey	Robbie Smith	Josh Woods	Marloshawn Franklin	Sean Whyte	Adarius Taylor	BC Lions
20	Chad Kelly	Ka'Deem Carey	Geno Lewis	Ryan Hunter	Bryan Cox Jr.	Micah Awe	Mason Pierce	Cody Grace	Jonathan Jones	Calgary Stampeders
21	Dru Brown	Dedrick Mills	Rasheed Bailey	Asotui Eli	Julian Howsare	Brian Cole II	Mason Pierce	Sergio Castillo	Thomas Costigan	Winnipeg Blue Bombers

Monthly Honour Roll
Month	Quarterback	Running Back	Receiver	Offensive Lineman	Defensive Lineman	Linebacker	Defensive Back	Kicker/Punter	Safety	Offensive Line
June	Zach Collaros	A.J. Ouellette	Kaion Julien-Grant	Landon Rice	Anthony Lanier II	Douglas Coleman III	Robertson Daniel	Sean Whyte	Tyrell Richards	Toronto Argonauts
July	Dane Evans	James Butler	Reggie Begelton	Brandon Revenberg	Mustafa Johnson	Bo Lokombo	Garry Peters	René Paredes	Adarius Pickett	Winnipeg Blue Bombers
August	Tre Ford	A.J. Ouellette	DaVaris Daniels	Brandon Revenberg	Anthony Lanier II	Tyrell Richards	Marc-Antoine Dequoy	Brett Lauther	Gary Johnson Jr.	Edmonton Elks
September	Vernon Adams	Devonte Williams	Justin McInnis	Peter Nicastro	Christian Albright	Cameron Judge	Marc-Antoine Dequoy	Cody Grace	Tanner Green	Winnipeg Blue Bombers
October	Chad Kelly	Brady Oliveira	Kenny Lawler	Brett Boyko	Mustafa Johnson	Cameron Judge	Mason Pierce	Sean Whyte	Adarius Taylor	Winnipeg Blue Bombers

=== Pro Football Focus ===
Team of the Week
Week	Offence			Defence			Special Teams
Week	Backfield	Receivers	Linemen	Linemen	Secondary	Backfield	Special Teams
1	QB Collaros (WPG); RB Oliveira (WPG)	Outside Mack (MTL); Slot E. Lewis (EDM); Slot Demski (WPG); Slot Rhymes (BC); Outside Wolitarsky (WPG)	LT Bryant (WPG); LG Peirson (BC); C Godber (SSK); RG Matte (MTL); RT Hardrick (WPG)	Edge Lanier II (SSK); Interior Baron (BC); Interior Sewell (MTL); Edge Vaughters (CGY)	CB Houston (WPG); HB Evans (MTL); LB A. Williams (MTL); LB Thurman (HAM); Cover LB Edwards (HAM); HB Murray (MTL); CB G. Peters (BC)	S Dequoy (MTL)	K Côté (MTL); P Zema (MTL); Returner Worthy (MTL)
2	QB Collaros (WPG); RB Mizzell (BC)	Outside Coxie (TOR); Slot Schoen (WPG); Slot D'ha. Williams (HAM); Slot Begelton (CGY); Outside Emilus (SSK)	LT Broxton (BC); LG Desjarlais (OTT); C Kolankowski (WPG); RG Chungh (BC); RT Hardrick (WPG)	Edge Howsare (CGY); Interior Brinkman (TOR); Interior Orimolade (TOR); Edge Haba (WPG)	CB Roberson (CGY); HB Wall (CGY); LB Lokombo (BC); LB Dean (SSK); Cover LB Hladik (BC); HB Rugamba (BC); CB D. Williams (SSK)	S R. Daniel (TOR)	K Whyte (BC); P Flint (HAM); Returner Grant (WPG)
3	QB Fajardo (MTL); RB Morrow (SSK)	Outside Hollins (BC); Slot Julien-Grant (MTL); Slot White (HAM); Slot Brissett (TOR); Outside Mack (MTL)	LT Callender (MTL); LG Lestage (MTL); C Nicastro (TOR); RG Giffen (TOR); RT Allen (TOR)	Edge Lanier II (SSK); Interior Hendrix (TOR); Interior M. Rose (CGY); Edge Carney (HAM)	CB Edwards-Cooper (BC); HB L. Purifoy (EDM); LB Bighill (WPG); LB Jones (TOR); Cover LB Judge (CGY); HB Pickett (TOR); CB G. Peters (BC)	S R. Metchie (TOR)	K Paredes (CGY); P Korsak (SSK); Returner Sims (EDM)
4	QB Kelly (TOR); RB Tuggle (OTT)	Outside Hatcher (BC); Slot Julien-Grant (MTL); Slot Schoen (WPG); Slot Phillips (TOR); Outside Mack (MTL)	LT Callender (MTL); LG Desjarlais (OTT); C Kolankowski (WPG); RG Matte (MTL); RT Rice (MTL)	Edge Orimolade (TOR); Interior Debaillie (BC); Interior Banks (BC); Edge Jefferson (WPG)	CB Dandridge (OTT); HB R. Daniel (TOR); LB McManis (TOR); LB Jones (TOR); Cover LB Clements (WPG); HB Coleman III (OTT); CB Gray (EDM)	S B. Alexander (WPG)	K Ward (OTT); P Zema (MTL); Returner Leake (TOR)
5	QB Harris (SSK); RB Mills (CGY)	Outside Hatcher (BC); Slot Sindani (HAM); Slot Picton (SSK); Slot Begelton (CGY); Outside Mack (MTL)	LT Callender (MTL); LG Desjarlais (OTT); C Lawrence (MTL); RG Matte (MTL); RT Rice (MTL)	Edge Jeffcoat (WPG); Interior Walker (WPG); Interior M. Rose (CGY); Edge A.C. Leonard (EDM)	CB Marshall (SSK); HB Ruffin (MTL); LB A. Williams (MTL); LB Vrede (OTT); Cover LB Edwards (HAM); HB R. Leonard (HAM); CB Bailey (OTT)	S Dequoy (MTL)	K Côté (MTL); P Grace (CGY); Returner Grant (WPG)
6	QB Kelly (TOR); RB Butler (HAM)	Outside Ungerer III (TOR); Slot Demski (WPG); Slot Daniels (TOR); Slot Behar (OTT); Outside Hakunavanhu (CGY)	LT Riley (HAM); LG Lestage (MTL); C Kolankowski (WPG); RG Woodmansey (HAM); RT Rice (MTL)	Edge Vaughters (CGY); Interior M. Rose (CGY); Interior Walker (WPG); Edge Carney (HAM)	CB Marshall (SSK); HB R. Daniel (TOR); LB Awe (CGY); LB Beverette (MTL); Cover LB Griffin (OTT); HB Edwards (HAM); CB Daramy-Swaray (WPG)	S Dequoy (MTL)	K Paredes (CGY); P Grace (CGY); Returner Alford (SSK)
7	QB Collaros (WPG); RB Oliveira (WPG)	Outside Barnes (CGY); Slot Behar (OTT); Slot Hardy (OTT); Slot Begelton (CGY); Outside Lawler (WPG)	LT Bryant (WPG); LG Revenberg (HAM); C Kolankowski (WPG); RG Jack-Kurdyla (EDM); RT Kelly (SSK)	Edge Orimolade (TOR); Interior M. Rose (CGY); Interior Baron (BC); Edge Carter (OTT)	CB Dandridge (OTT); HB R. Leonard (HAM); LB Lokombo (BC); LB Judge (CGY); Cover LB Hladik (BC); HB Henderson (SSK); CB Houston (WPG)	S Mauger (BC)	K Whyte (BC); P Flint (HAM); Returner McAllister (HAM)
8	QB Evans (BC); RB Ouellette (TOR)	Outside Jones (SSK); Slot Bane (SSK); Slot Begelton (CGY); Slot Julien-Grant (MTL); Outside Mitchell (EDM)	LT Broxton (BC); LG Revenberg (HAM); C Ciraco (TOR); RG Woodmansey (HAM); RT Allen (TOR)	Edge Orimolade (TOR); Interior Baron (BC); Interior Mus. Johnson (MTL); Edge Howsare (CGY)	CB Ento (MTL); HB Amos (TOR); LB McManis (TOR); LB Judge (CGY); Cover LB Murray (MTL); HB Kanneh (OTT); CB G. Peters (BC)	S Mauger (BC)	K Paredes (CGY); P Leone (OTT); Returner Leake (TOR)
9	QB Collaros (WPG); RB Mills (CGY)	Outside Lawler (WPG); Slot Schoen (WPG); Slot Snead (MTL); Slot Bane (SSK); Outside T. Lewis (CGY)	LT Callender (MTL); LG Lestage (MTL); C Beard (HAM); RG Matte (MTL); RT McGloster (MTL)	Edge Jefferson (WPG); Interior Walker (WPG); Interior M. Rose (CGY); Edge Lanier II (SSK)	CB Moxey (CGY); HB R. Metchie (TOR); LB Santos-Knox (OTT); LB Jones (TOR); Cover LB Beverette (MTL); HB Rugamba (BC); CB Houston (WPG)	S B. Dozier (CGY)	K Lauther (SSK); P Grace (CGY); Returner T. Williams (BC)
10	QB Kelly (TOR); RB Oliveira (WPG)	Outside Hatcher (BC); Slot Daniels (TOR); Slot Moore (EDM); Slot Acklin (OTT); Outside Hollins (BC)	LT Ivey (EDM); LG Lestage (MTL); C Lawrence (MTL); RG Neufeld (WPG); RT Allen (TOR)	Edge Jeffcoat (WPG); Interior Banks (BC); Interior Baron (BC); Edge Ellis (MTL)	CB G. Peters (BC); HB Stubblefield (MTL); LB Awe (CGY); LB Beverette (MTL); Cover LB Rugamba (BC); HB Henderson (SSK); CB Brooks (OTT)	S Dequoy (MTL)	K Whyte (BC); P Grace (CGY); Returner T. Williams (BC)
11	QB Ford (EDM); RB Butler (HAM)	Outside Hollins (BC); Slot Dunbar (EDM); Slot White (HAM); Slot Snead (MTL); Outside Mack (MTL)	LT Bell (CGY); LG Lestage (MTL); C Kolankowski (WPG); RG Jack-Kurdyla (EDM); RT Boyko (EDM)	Edge Ménard (BC); Interior Micah Johnson (SSK); Interior Mus. Johnson (MTL); Edge Lanier II (SSK)	CB Houston (WPG); HB K. Williams (CGY); LB Richards (MTL); LB Woods (BC); Cover LB Wall (CGY); HB Lee (BC); CB Baltimore (OTT)	S B. Dozier (CGY)	K Lauther (SSK); P Sheahan (WPG); Returner T. Lewis (CGY)
12	QB Ford (EDM); RB Ouellette (TOR)	Outside E. Lewis (EDM); Slot Begelton (CGY); Slot Demski (WPG); Slot White (HAM); Outside Mack (MTL)	LT Kemp (HAM); LG Revenberg (HAM); C Ciraco (TOR); RG Woodmansey (HAM); RT Allen (TOR)	Edge Jeffcoat (WPG); Interior C. Sayles (HAM); Interior Oakman (TOR); Edge Carney (HAM)	CB W. Rose (WPG); HB Bratton (EDM); LB McManis (TOR); LB Wilson (WPG); Cover LB Richards (MTL); HB M. Sayles (BC); CB Taylor (CGY)	S Dequoy (MTL)	K Faithfull (EDM); P Bede (TOR); Returner Leake (TOR)
13	QB Adams (BC); RB Oliveira (WPG)	Outside E. Lewis (EDM); Slot Demski (WPG); Slot White (HAM); Slot Gittens Jr. (TOR); Outside Mack (MTL)	LT Figueroa (HAM); LG Revenberg (HAM); C Ciraco (TOR); RG Nicastro (TOR); RT Boyko (EDM)	Edge Ceresna (EDM); Interior Brown (SSK); Interior Sewell (MTL); Edge Jeffcoat (WPG)	CB J. Peters (TOR); HB B. Dozier (CGY); LB J. Williams (TOR); LB Woods (BC); Cover LB McLaurin (EDM); HB Holm (WPG); CB Marshall (SSK)	S Mauger (BC)	K Lauther (SSK); P Sheahen (WPG); Returner T. Lewis (CGY)
14	QB Collaros (WPG); RB Oliveira (WPG)	Outside Lawler (WPG); Slot White (HAM); Slot Nield (TOR); Slot Schoen (WPG); Outside E. Lewis (EDM)	LT Ivey (EDM); LG Lestage (MTL); C McEwen (CGY); RG Jack-Kurdyla (EDM); RT Boyko (EDM)	Edge Jeffcoat (WPG); Interior Ta'ala (OTT); Interior Brown (SSK); Edge Mauldin IV (OTT)	CB J. Peters (TOR); HB Muhammad (CGY); LB Judge (CGY); LB Santos-Knox (OTT); Cover LB Pickett (TOR); HB K. Williams (CGY); CB Dandridge (OTT)	S L. Purifoy (EDM)	K Castillo (WPG); P Grace (CGY); Returner McAllister (HAM)
15	QB Crum (OTT); RB K. Brown (EDM)	Outside Godwin (HAM); Slot McInnis (BC); Slot Schoen (WPG); Slot Hardy (OTT); Outside Moore (EDM)	LT Revenberg (HAM); LG Hunter (TOR); C Korte (EDM); RG Nicastro (TOR); RT Hardrick (WPG)	Edge Mauldin IV (OTT); Interior Walker (WPG); Interior Debaillie (BC); Edge Ceresna (EDM)	CB Edwards-Cooper (BC); HB Holm (WPG); LB Beverette (MTL); LB Wilson (WPG); Cover LB Stubblefield (HAM); HB Elliott (HAM); CB Baltimore (OTT)	S Katsantonis (HAM)	K Ward (OTT); P Julien (EDM); Returner T. Williams (BC)
16	QB Crum (OTT); RB Stanback (MTL)	Outside Smith (HAM); Slot Brissett (TOR); Slot Cottoy (BC); Slot Begelton (CGY); Outside Moore (EDM)	LT Broxton (BC); LG Revenberg (HAM); C Lawrence (MTL); RG Ferland (SSK); RT Allen (TOR)	Edge Carter (OTT); Interior Oakman (TOR); Interior C. Sayles (HAM); Edge Albright (SSK)	CB Gray (EDM); HB McFadden (TOR); LB McManis (TOR); LB Thurman (HAM); Cover LB Pickett (TOR); HB Bratton (EDM); CB Stiggers (TOR)	S Dequoy (MTL)	K Whyte (BC); P Korsak (SSK); Returner Alford (SSK)
17	QB Adams (BC); RB Butler (HAM)	Outside Hatcher (BC); Slot Odoms-Dukes (CGY); Slot Rhymes (BC); Slot Sterns (SSK); Outside Michel (CGY)	LT Callender (MTL); LG Revenberg (HAM); C Kolankowski (WPG); RG Neufeld (WPG); RT Hardrick (WPG)	Edge Betts (BC); Interior C. Sayles (HAM); Interior Mus. Johnson (MTL); Edge Carney (HAM)	CB Stiggers (TOR); HB Pierce (TOR); LB Judge (CGY); LB Griffin (OTT); Cover LB Edwards (HAM); HB Muhammad (CGY); CB G. Peters (BC)	S Dequoy (MTL)	K Castillo (WPG); P Zema (MTL); Returner Letcher (MTL)
18	QB Kelly (TOR); RB Oliveira (WPG)	Outside Lawler (WPG); Slot Bayless (HAM); Slot Snead (MTL); Slot Cottoy (BC); Outside Philpot (MTL)	LT Murray (HAM); LG Steward (OTT); C Godber (SSK); RG Matte (MTL); RT Boyko (EDM)	Edge Jefferson (WPG); Interior Mus. Johnson (MTL); Interior Debaillie (BC); Edge Teuhema (BC)	CB Marshall (SSK); HB Stubblefield (MTL); LB McManis (TOR); LB Lawrence (HAM); Cover LB Pickett (TOR); HB Pierce (TOR); CB R. Leonard (HAM)	S Katsantonis (HAM)	K Whyte (BC); P Julien (EDM); Returner Dev. Williams (OTT)
19	QB Adams (BC); RB Dev. Williams (OTT)	Outside Hollins (BC); Slot Daniels (TOR); Slot White (HAM); Slot Hardy (OTT); Outside Smith (HAM)	LT Ivey (EDM); LG Hunter (TOR); C Beard (HAM); RG Matte (MTL); RT Coker (CGY)	Edge Smith (TOR); Interior Mus. Johnson (MTL); Interior C. Sayles (HAM); Edge Orimolade (TOR)	CB Marshall (SSK); HB Gainey (EDM); LB Judge (CGY); LB Santos-Knox (OTT); Cover LB Pickett (TOR); HB Stubblefield (MTL); CB R. Leonard (HAM)	S Franklin (EDM)	K Whyte (BC); P Grace (CGY); Returner Letcher (MTL)
20	QB Kelly (TOR); RB Logan (CGY)	Outside E. Lewis (EDM); Slot McInnis (BC); Slot Cottoy (BC); Slot Schaffer-Baker (SSK); Outside Lawler (WPG)	LT Bryant (WPG); LG Hunter (TOR); C Couture (BC); RG Neufeld (WPG); RT Boyko (EDM)	Edge Cox Jr. (SSK); Interior Banks (BC); Interior Oakman (TOR); Edge Costigan (TOR)	CB Stiggers (TOR); HB Pierce (TOR); LB Awe (CGY); LB McManis (TOR); Cover LB Pickett (TOR); HB M. Sayles (BC); CB Moxey (CGY)	S K. Williams (CGY)	K Faithfull (EDM); P Grace (CGY); Returner D. Alexander (EDM)
21	QB D. Brown (WPG); RB Mills (CGY)	Outside Lawler (WPG); Slot Tucker (CGY); Slot Spieker (MTL); Slot Hardy (OTT); Outside Bailey (WPG)	LT Demery (CGY); LG Gray (WPG); C Lawrence (MTL); RG Sceviour (CGY); RT Hardrick (WPG)	Edge Howsare (CGY); Interior Lawson (WPG); Interior Mus. Johnson (MTL); Edge Barlow (TOR)	CB McGhee (OTT); HB Pierce (TOR); LB Cole II (WPG); LB Thurman (HAM); Cover LB Sankey (MTL); HB Addae (OTT); CB Ento (MTL)	S Howell (OTT)	K Castillo (WPG); P Zema (MTL); Returner Letcher (MTL)

Players of the Week
Week	Quarterback	Offensive Player	Offensive Line	Pass-Rusher	Run Defender	Coverage Player
1	Zach Collaros	Geno Lewis	BC Lions	Anthony Lanier II	Avery Williams	Ciante Evans
2	Zach Collaros	Damonte Coxie	BC Lions	Julian Howsare	Shawn Oakman	Titus Wall
3	Cody Fajardo	Jamal Morrow	Toronto Argonauts	Dewayne Hendrix	Adam Bighill	Royce Metchie
4	Chad Kelly	Kaion Julien-Grant	Winnipeg Blue Bombers	Willie Jefferson	Emmanuel Rugamba	Robertson Daniel
5	Trevor Harris	Dedrick Mills	Montreal Alouettes	Jackson Jeffcoat	Larry Dean	Nick Marshall
6	Chad Kelly	James Butler	Hamilton Tiger-Cats	Mike Rose	Larry Dean	Robertson Daniel
7	Zach Collaros	Nate Behar	Winnipeg Blue Bombers	Folarin Orimolade	Demarcus Christmas	Richard Leonard
8	Dane Evans	Tevin Jones	BC Lions	Mustafa Johnson	Frankie Griffin	Kabion Ento
9	Zach Collaros	Kenny Lawler	Montreal Alouettes	Willie Jefferson	Jovan Santos-Knox	Royce Metchie
10	Chad Kelly	DaVaris Daniels	Toronto Argonauts	Avery Ellis	Jordan Williams	Amari Henderson
11	Tre Ford	James Butler	Edmonton Elks	Anthony Lanier II	Tyrell Richards	Sherrod Baltimore
12	Tre Ford	Reggie Begelton	Toronto Argonauts	Casey Sayles	Jackson Jeffcoat	Marc-Antoine Dequoy
13	Vernon Adams	A.J. Ouellette	BC Lions	Almondo Sewell	Miles Brown	Quincy Mauger
14	Zach Collaros	Devonte Williams	Edmonton Elks	Anthony Lanier II	Reggie Stubblefield	Jamal Peters
15	Dustin Crum	Kevin Brown	Edmonton Elks	Jake Ceresna	Tyrice Beverette	Stavros Katsantonis
16	Dustin Crum	Dejon Brissett	Montreal Alouettes	Bryce Carter	Christian Albright	Wynton McManis
17	Vernon Adams	Keon Hatcher	Winnipeg Blue Bombers	Casey Sayles	Ben Hladik	Mason Pierce
18	Chad Kelly	Brady Oliveira	Montreal Alouettes	Mustafa Johnson	Casey Sayles	Stavros Katsantonis
19	Vernon Adams	DaVaris Daniels	Montreal Alouettes	Adarius Pickett	Simoni Lawrence	Cameron Judge
20	Chad Kelly	Peyton Logan	Winnipeg Blue Bombers	Woody Baron	Cameron Judge	Nick Hallett
21	Dru Brown	Cameron Dukes	Winnipeg Blue Bombers	Julian Howsare	Brian Cole II	Darnell Sankey

PFF 2023 CFL midseason awards
Award	Winner	Honourable Mentions
Most Outstanding Player	Zach Collaros (Winnipeg Blue Bombers)	Chad Kelly (Toronto Argonauts); A.J. Ouellette (Toronto Argonauts); Garry Peters (BC Lions)
Most Outstanding Rookie	Dustin Crum (Ottawa Redblacks)	Austin Mack (Montreal Alouettes); Taquan Mizzell (BC Lions); Kordell Rodgers (Montreal Alouettes)
Most Outstanding Canadian	Brady Oliveira (Winnipeg Blue Bombers)	Landon Rice (Montreal Alouettes); Alonzo Addae (Ottawa Redblacks); Mathieu Betts (BC Lions)
Most Outstanding Defensive Player	Garry Peters (BC Lions)	Robertson Daniel (Toronto Argonauts); Mike Rose (Calgary Stampeders); Willie Jefferson (Winnipeg Blue Bombers)
Most Outstanding Offensive Lineman	Landon Rice (Montreal Alouettes)	Pier-Olivier Lestage (Montreal Alouettes); Dejon Allen (Toronto Argonauts); Brandon Revenberg (Hamilton Tiger-Cats)
John Agro Special Teams Award	Javon Leake (Toronto Argonauts)	René Paredes (Calgary Stampeders); Lewis Ward (Ottawa Redblacks); Kene Onyeka (Ottawa Redblacks)
Annis Stukus Trophy (Coach of the Year)	Ryan Dinwiddie (Toronto Argonauts)	Rick Campbell (BC Lions); Jason Maas (Montreal Alouettes); Mike O'Shea (Winnipeg Blue Bombers)

PFF 2023 CFL midseason all-star team
Position	First Team	Second Team
Offence
Quarterback	Zach Collaros (Winnipeg Blue Bombers)	Chad Kelly (Toronto Argonauts)
Running Back	A.J. Ouellette (Toronto Argonauts)	Brady Oliveira (Winnipeg Blue Bombers)
Outside WR	Kenny Lawler (Winnipeg Blue Bombers)	Alexander Hollins (BC Lions)
Slot WR	Keon Hatcher (BC Lions)	Kaion Julien-Grant (Montreal Alouettes)
Slot WR	Dalton Schoen (Winnipeg Blue Bombers)	Nic Demski (Winnipeg Blue Bombers)
Slot WR	Reggie Begelton (Calgary Stampeders)	DaVaris Daniels (Toronto Argonauts)
Outside WR	Austin Mack (Montreal Alouettes)	Damonte Coxie (Toronto Argonauts)
Left Tackle	Jarell Broxton (BC Lions)	Nick Callender (Montreal Alouettes)
Left Guard	Pier-Olivier Lestage (Montreal Alouettes)	Brandon Revenberg (Hamilton Tiger-Cats)
Center	Chris Kolankowski (Winnipeg Blue Bombers)	Peter Godber (Saskatchewan Roughriders)
Right Guard	Kristian Matte (Montreal Alouettes)	Coulter Woodmansey (Hamilton Tiger-Cats)
Right Tackle	Landon Rice (Montreal Alouettes)	Dejon Allen (Toronto Argonauts)
Defence
Interior	Mike Rose (Calgary Stampeders)	Josh Banks (BC Lions)
Interior	Mustafa Johnson (Montreal Alouettes)	Casey Sayles (Hamilton Tiger-Cats)
Edge	Anthony Lanier (Saskatchewan Roughriders)	Mathieu Betts (BC Lions)
Edge	Willie Jefferson (Winnipeg Blue Bombers)	Folarin Orimolade (Toronto Argonauts)
Linebacker	Larry Dean (Saskatchewan Roughriders)	Bo Lokombo (BC Lions)
Linebacker	Tyrice Beverette (Montreal Alouettes)	Micah Awe (Calgary Stampeders)
Cover LB	Adarius Pickett (Toronto Argonauts)	Chris Edwards (Hamilton Tiger-Cats)
Cornerback	Garry Peters (BC Lions)	Nick Marshall (Saskatchewan Roughriders)
Cornerback	Demerio Houston (Winnipeg Blue Bombers)	Brandin Dandridge (Ottawa Redblacks)
Halfback	Robertson Daniel (Toronto Argonauts)	Amari Henderson (Saskatchewan Roughriders)
Halfback	Richard Leonard (Hamilton Tiger-Cats)	Najee Murray (Montreal Alouettes)
Free Safety	Royce Metchie (Toronto Argonauts)	Alonzo Addae (Ottawa Redblacks)
Special Teams
Kicker	René Paredes (Calgary Stampeders)	Lewis Ward (Ottawa Redblacks)
Punter	Cody Grace (Calgary Stampeders)	Adam Korsak (Saskatchewan Roughriders)
Kick Returner	Terry Williams (BC Lions)	Chandler Worthy (Montreal Alouettes)
Punt Returner	Javon Leake (Toronto Argonauts)	Janarion Grant (Winnipeg Blue Bombers)
Special Teams	Kene Onyeka (Ottawa Redblacks)	Tyrell Richards (Montreal Alouettes)

PFF CFL 2023 Awards
Award	Winner	Honourable Mention
Most Outstanding Player	Chad Kelly (Toronto Argonauts)	Vernon Adams (BC Lions); Brady Oliveira (Winnipeg Blue Bombers)
Most Outstanding Offensive Player	Brady Oliveira (Winnipeg Blue Bombers)	Vernon Adams (BC Lions); A.J. Ouellette (Toronto Argonauts)
Most Outstanding Defensive Player	Marc-Antoine Dequoy (Montreal Alouettes)	Mathieu Betts (BC Lions); Mustafa Johnson (Montreal Alouettes)
Most Outstanding Offensive Rookie	Austin Mack (Montreal Alouettes)	Dustin Crum (Ottawa Redblacks); Taquan Mizzell (BC Lions)
Most Outstanding Defensive Rookie	Reggie Stubblefield (Montreal Alouettes)	Qwan'tez Stiggers (Toronto Argonauts); Mason Pierce (Toronto Argonauts)
Comeback Player of the Year	Peter Nicastro (Toronto Argonauts)	Tre Roberson (Calgary Stampeders); Kyrie Wilson (Winnipeg Blue Bombers)
Breakout Player of the Year	Samuel Emilus (Saskatchewan Roughriders)	Stavros Katsantonis (Hamilton Tiger-Cats); Bryce Carter (Ottawa Redblacks)
Most Outstanding Receiver	Dalton Schoen (Winnipeg Blue Bombers)	Keon Hatcher (BC Lions); Reggie Begelton (Calgary Stampeders)
Most Outstanding Offensive Lineman	Brandon Revenberg (Hamilton Tiger-Cats)	Jermarcus Hardrick (Winnipeg Blue Bombers); Nick Callender (Montreal Alouettes)
Most Outstanding Pass-Blocker	Dejon Allen (Toronto Argonauts)	David Beard (Hamilton Tiger-Cats); Peter Godber (Saskatchewan Roughriders)
Most Outstanding Run-Blocker	Pier-Olivier Lestage (Montreal Alouettes)	Brandon Revenberg (Hamilton Tiger-Cats); Martez Ivey (Edmonton Elks)
Most Outstanding Pass-Rusher	Mathieu Betts (BC Lions)	Mustafa Johnson (Montreal Alouettes); Folarin Orimolade (Toronto Argonauts)
Most Outstanding Run Defender	Jovan Santos-Knox (Ottawa Redblacks)	Casey Sayles (Hamilton Tiger-Cats); Larry Dean (Saskatchewan Roughriders)
Most Outstanding Coverage Defender	Garry Peters (BC Lions)	Richard Leonard (Hamilton Tiger-Cats); Reggie Stubblefield (Montreal Alouettes)
Most Outstanding Special Teams Player	Carthell Flowers-Lloyd (Hamilton Tiger-Cats)	Sean Whyte (BC Lions); Tyrice Beverette (Montreal Alouettes)

PFF 2023 CFL All-Star Team
Position	First Team	Second Team
Offence
Quarterback	Chad Kelly (Toronto Argonauts)	Vernon Adams (BC Lions)
Running Back	Brady Oliveira (Winnipeg Blue Bombers)	A.J. Ouellette (Toronto Argonauts)
Outside WR	Kenny Lawler (Winnipeg Blue Bombers)	Alexander Hollins (BC Lions)
Slot WR	Dalton Schoen (Winnipeg Blue Bombers)	Nic Demski (Winnipeg Blue Bombers)
Slot WR	Keon Hatcher (BC Lions)	DaVaris Daniels (Toronto Argonauts)
Slot WR	Reggie Begelton (Calgary Stampeders)	Tim White (Hamilton Tiger-Cats)
Outside WR	Austin Mack (Montreal Alouettes)	Eugene Lewis (Edmonton Elks)
Left Tackle	Nick Callender (Montreal Alouettes)	Jarell Broxton (BC Lions)
Left Guard	Brandon Revenberg (Hamilton Tiger-Cats)	Pier-Olivier Lestage (Montreal Alouettes)
Center	Peter Godber (Saskatchewan Roughriders)	Chris Kolankowski (Winnipeg Blue Bombers)
Right Guard	Peter Nicastro (Toronto Argonauts)	Kristian Matte (Montreal Alouettes)
Right Tackle	Dejon Allen (Toronto Argonauts)	Jermarcus Hardrick (Winnipeg Blue Bombers)
Defence
Interior	Mustafa Johnson (Montreal Alouettes)	Woody Baron (BC Lions)
Interior	Casey Sayles (Hamilton Tiger-Cats)	Mike Rose (Calgary Stampeders)
Edge	Mathieu Betts (BC Lions)	Julian Howsare (Calgary Stampeders)
Edge	Folarin Orimolade (Toronto Argonauts)	Jake Ceresna (Edmonton Elks)
Interior LB	Cameron Judge (Calgary Stampeders)	Tyrice Beverette (Montreal Alouettes)
Interior LB	Wynton McManis (Toronto Argonauts)	Kyrie Wilson (Winnipeg Blue Bombers)
Sam Linebacker	Adarius Pickett (Toronto Argonauts)	Loucheiz Purifoy (Edmonton Elks)
Cornerback	Richard Leonard (Hamilton Tiger-Cats)	Qwan'tez Stiggers (Toronto Argonauts)
Cornerback	Garry Peters (BC Lions)	Jamal Peters (Toronto Argonauts)
Halfback	Reggie Stubblefield (Montreal Alouettes)	Kobe Williams (Calgary Stampeders)
Halfback	Mason Pierce (Toronto Argonauts)	Robertson Daniel (Toronto Argonauts)
Free Safety	Marc-Antoine Dequoy (Montreal Alouettes)	Quincy Mauger (BC Lions)
Special Teams
Kicker	Sean Whyte (BC Lions)	René Paredes (Calgary Stampeders)
Punter	Cody Grace (Calgary Stampeders)	Joseph Zema (Montreal Alouettes)
Kick Returner	Tyreik McAllister (Hamilton Tiger-Cats)	Chandler Worthy (Montreal Alouettes)
Punt Returner	Javon Leake (Toronto Argonauts)	Janarion Grant (Winnipeg Blue Bombers)
Special Teams	Carthell Flowers-Lloyd (Hamilton Tiger-Cats)	Tyrice Beverette (Montreal Alouettes)
Long Snapper	Tanner Doll (Ottawa Redblacks)	Jorgen Hus (Saskatchewan Roughriders)

=== 3DownNation ===
Best of the Week
Week	Offensive Player	Defensive Player	Special Teams Player	Breakout Player	Offensive Line	Coach
1	Zach Collaros	Willie Jefferson	Zach Lindley	Austin Mack	BC Lions	Ryan Phillips
2	Trevor Harris	Micah Awe	Janarion Grant	Samuel Emilus	Winnipeg Blue Bombers	Ryan Phillips
3	Cody Fajardo	Mathieu Betts	Chandler Worthy	Michael Griffin II	Toronto Argonauts	Ryan Phillips
4	De'Montre Tuggle	Robertson Daniel	Javon Leake	De'Montre Tuggle	Winnipeg Blue Bombers	Khari Jones
5	Vernon Adams	A.C. Leonard	Brian Cole II	Greg McCrae	Hamilton Tiger-Cats	Mike O'Shea
6	Chad Kelly	James Vaughters	Mario Alford	Dustin Crum	Toronto Argonauts	Brent Monson
7	Marken Michel	Woody Baron	Tyreik McAllister	Clark Barnes	Toronto Argonauts	Ryan Phillips
8	Shawn Bane	Frankie Griffin	Javon Leake	Frankie Griffin	Montreal Alouettes	Ryan Phillips
9	Kenny Lawler	Shawn Lemon	Kevin Francis	Jerreth Sterns	Winnipeg Blue Bombers	Buck Pierce
10	DaVaris Daniels	Tyrice Beverette	Javon Leake	Dru Brown	Montreal Alouettes	Jason Maas
11	Steven Dunbar	Nyles Morgan	T.J. Brunson	Jake Dolegala	Edmonton Elks	Kelly Jeffrey
12	Reggie Begelton	Folarin Orimolade	Javon Leake	Tre Ford	Winnipeg Blue Bombers	Mickey Donovan
13	Austin Mack	Adarius Pickett	Brett Lauther	Quincy Mauger	Toronto Argonauts	Jason Shivers
14	Zach Collaros	Simoni Lawrence	Boris Bede	Tommy Nield	Winnipeg Blue Bombers	Buck Pierce
15	Justin McInnis	Stavros Katsantonis	Terry Williams	Brandon Barlow	Edmonton Elks	Scott Milanovich
16	Taquan Mizzell	Bryce Carter	Mario Alford	Kiondré Smith	Montreal Alouettes	Bob Dyce
17	Vernon Adams	Reggie Stubblefield	Sean Whyte	Cameron Dukes	Winnipeg Blue Bombers	Ryan Dinwiddie
18	Zach Collaros	Simoni Lawrence	Boris Bede	Omar Bayless	Hamilton Tiger-Cats	Mike Gibson
19	Tim White	Casey Sayles	James Letcher	Tobias Harris	Toronto Argonauts	Byron Archambault
20	Samuel Emilus	Cameron Judge	Deontez Alexander	Daniel Adeboboye	Calgary Stampeders	Dave Dickenson
21	Dru Brown	Adarius Pickett	Sergio Castillo	Benjie Franklin	Winnipeg Blue Bombers	Mike O'Shea

2023 mid-season CFL award winners
Award	Winner	Runner-ups
Most Outstanding Player	Chad Kelly (Toronto Argonauts)	Zach Collaros (Winnipeg Blue Bombers); Vernon Adams (BC Lions)
Most Outstanding Defensive Player	Mathieu Betts (BC Lions)	Garry Peters (BC Lions); Robertson Daniel (Toronto Argonauts)
Most Outstanding Canadian	Mathieu Betts (BC Lions)	Brady Oliveira (Winnipeg Blue Bombers); Nic Demski (Winnipeg Blue Bombers)
Most Outstanding Offensive Lineman	Landon Rice (Montreal Alouettes)	Jarell Broxton (BC Lions); Ryan Hunter (Toronto Argonauts)
Most Outstanding Rookie	Dustin Crum (Ottawa Redblacks)	Qwan'tez Stiggers (Toronto Argonauts); Tyreik McAllister (Hamilton Tiger-Cats)
Most Outstanding Special Teams Player	Javon Leake (Toronto Argonauts)	Mario Alford (Saskatchewan Roughriders); Carthell Flowers-Lloyd (Hamilton Tiger-Cats)
Coach of the Year	Ryan Dinwiddie (Toronto Argonauts)	Rick Campbell (BC Lions); Mike O'Shea (Winnipeg Blue Bombers)

2023 mid-season CFL all-stars
—	Offence			Defence			Special teams
—	Backfield	Receivers	Linemen	Primary	Secondary	Backfield	Special teams
First Team	QB (United States) Kelly (TOR); RB (Canada) Oliveira (WPG)	Outside (United States) Bane (SSK); Slot (United States) Mack (MTL); Slot (United States) Hatcher (BC); Slot (United States) Schoen (WPG); Outside (Canada) Demski (WPG)	LT (United States) Broxton (BC); LG (Canada) Rice (MTL); C (Canada) Revenberg (HAM); RG (Canada) Hunter (TOR); RT (Canada) Kolankowski (WPG)	Edge (Canada) Betts (BC); Interior (United States) Jefferson (WPG); Interior (United States) Rose (CGY); Edge (United States) Hendrix (TOR)	CB (United States) Peters (BC); HB (United States) Dandridge (OTT); LB (United States) McManis (TOR); LB (United States) Awe (CGY); Cover LB (United States) Pickett (TOR); HB (United States) Daniel (TOR); CB (United States) Nichols (WPG)	S (Canada) Metchie (TOR)	K (Canada) Whyte (BC); P (United States) Leone (OTT); Returner (United States) Leake (TOR); Special Teams (United States) Flowers-Lloyd (HAM)
Second Team	QB (United States) Collaros (WPG); RB (United States) Ouellette (TOR)	Outside (United States) Daniels (TOR); Slot (United States) Begelton (CGY); Slot (United States) Jones (SSK); Slot (United States) Hollins (BC); Outside (Canada) Julien-Grant (MTL)	LT (United States) Hardrick (WPG); LG (United States) Allen (TOR); C (Canada) Chungh (BC); RG (Canada) Matte (MTL); RT (Canada) Beard (HAM)	Edge (United States) Orimolade (TOR); Interior (United States) Lanier II (SSK); Interior (United States) Sayles (HAM); Edge (United States) Johnson (SSK)	CB (United States) Marshall (SSK); HB (United States) Houston (WPG); LB (Canada) Lokombo (BC); LB (United States) Dean (SSK); Cover LB (United States) Edwards (HAM); HB (United States) Leonard (HAM); CB (United States) Holm (WPG)	S (Canada) Dequoy (MTL)	K (Canada) Ward (OTT); P (Australia) Grace (CGY); Returner (United States) Alford (SSK); Special Teams (Canada) Hutter (EDM)

== 2023 CFL all-star teams ==
=== 2023 CFL All-Stars ===
==== Offence ====
- QB – Chad Kelly, Toronto Argonauts
- RB – Brady Oliveira, Winnipeg Blue Bombers
- R – Dalton Schoen, Winnipeg Blue Bombers
- R – Tim White, Hamilton Tiger-Cats
- R – Keon Hatcher, BC Lions
- R – Austin Mack, Montreal Alouettes
- R – Reggie Begelton, Calgary Stampeders
- OT – Dejon Allen, Toronto Argonauts
- OT – Jermarcus Hardrick, Winnipeg Blue Bombers
- OG – Ryan Hunter, Toronto Argonauts
- OG – Patrick Neufeld, Winnipeg Blue Bombers
- C – Darius Ciraco, Toronto Argonauts

==== Defence ====
- DT – Casey Sayles, Hamilton Tiger-Cats
- DT – Mike Rose, Calgary Stampeders
- DE – Mathieu Betts, BC Lions
- DE – Willie Jefferson, Winnipeg Blue Bombers
- LB – Wynton McManis, Toronto Argonauts
- LB – Micah Awe, Calgary Stampeders
- CLB – Adarius Pickett, Toronto Argonauts
- CB – Demerio Houston, Winnipeg Blue Bombers
- CB – Garry Peters, BC Lions
- HB – Robertson Daniel, Toronto Argonauts
- HB – T.J. Lee, BC Lions
- S – Marc-Antoine Dequoy, Montreal Alouettes

==== Special teams ====
- K – Sean Whyte, BC Lions
- P – Richie Leone, Ottawa Redblacks
- ST – Javon Leake, Toronto Argonauts

=== 2023 CFL Western All-Stars ===
==== Offence ====
- QB – Zach Collaros, Winnipeg Blue Bombers
- RB – Brady Oliveira, Winnipeg Blue Bombers
- R – Dalton Schoen, Winnipeg Blue Bombers
- R – Keon Hatcher, BC Lions
- R – Reggie Begelton, Calgary Stampeders
- R – Alexander Hollins, BC Lions
- R – Nic Demski, Winnipeg Blue Bombers
- OT – Jermarcus Hardrick, Winnipeg Blue Bombers
- OT – Stanley Bryant, Winnipeg Blue Bombers
- OG – Patrick Neufeld, Winnipeg Blue Bombers
- OG – Sukh Chungh, BC Lions
- C – Sean McEwen, Calgary Stampeders

==== Defence ====
- DT – Mike Rose, Calgary Stampeders
- DT – Woody Baron, BC Lions
- DE – Mathieu Betts, BC Lions
- DE – Willie Jefferson, Winnipeg Blue Bombers
- LB – Micah Awe, Calgary Stampeders
- LB – Larry Dean, Saskatchewan Roughriders
- CLB – Emmanuel Rugamba, BC Lions
- CB – Demerio Houston, Winnipeg Blue Bombers
- CB – Garry Peters, BC Lions
- HB – T.J. Lee, BC Lions
- HB – Evan Holm, Winnipeg Blue Bombers
- S – Brandon Alexander, Winnipeg Blue Bombers

==== Special teams ====
- K – Sean Whyte, BC Lions
- P – Adam Korsak, Saskatchewan Roughriders
- ST – Mario Alford, Saskatchewan Roughriders

=== 2023 CFL Eastern All-Stars ===
==== Offence ====
- QB – Chad Kelly, Toronto Argonauts
- RB – A.J. Ouellette, Toronto Argonauts
- R – DaVaris Daniels, Toronto Argonauts
- R – Austin Mack, Montreal Alouettes
- R – Tim White, Hamilton Tiger-Cats
- R – Damonte Coxie, Toronto Argonauts
- R – Justin Hardy, Ottawa Redblacks
- OT – Dejon Allen, Toronto Argonauts
- OT – Nick Callender, Montreal Alouettes
- OG – Brandon Revenberg, Hamilton Tiger-Cats
- OG – Ryan Hunter, Toronto Argonauts
- C – Darius Ciraco, Toronto Argonauts

==== Defence ====
- DT – Casey Sayles, Hamilton Tiger-Cats
- DT – Mustafa Johnson, Montreal Alouettes
- DE – Folarin Orimolade, Toronto Argonauts
- DE – Bryce Carter, Ottawa Redblacks
- LB – Wynton McManis, Toronto Argonauts
- LB – Tyrice Beverette, Montreal Alouettes
- CLB – Adarius Pickett, Toronto Argonauts
- CB – Qwan'tez Stiggers, Toronto Argonauts
- CB – Brandin Dandridge, Ottawa Redblacks
- HB – Robertson Daniel, Toronto Argonauts
- HB – Wesley Sutton, Montreal Alouettes
- S – Marc-Antoine Dequoy, Montreal Alouettes

==== Special teams ====
- K – Boris Bede, Toronto Argonauts
- P – Richie Leone, Ottawa Redblacks
- ST – Javon Leake, Toronto Argonauts

== 2023 CFL awards ==
Award	West Division	East Division	League
Most Outstanding Player	Brady Oliveira (Winnipeg Blue Bombers)	Chad Kelly (Toronto Argonauts)	Chad Kelly (Toronto Argonauts)
Most Outstanding Canadian	Brady Oliveira (Winnipeg Blue Bombers)	Marc-Antoine Dequoy (Montreal Alouettes)	Brady Oliveira (Winnipeg Blue Bombers)
Most Outstanding Defensive Player	Mathieu Betts (BC Lions)	Adarius Pickett (Toronto Argonauts)	Mathieu Betts (BC Lions)
Most Outstanding Offensive Lineman	Jermarcus Hardrick (Winnipeg Blue Bombers)	Dejon Allen (Toronto Argonauts)	Dejon Allen (Toronto Argonauts)
Most Outstanding Special Teams Player	Sean Whyte (BC Lions)	Javon Leake (Toronto Argonauts)	Javon Leake (Toronto Argonauts)
Most Outstanding Rookie	Kai Gray (Edmonton Elks)	Qwan'tez Stiggers (Toronto Argonauts)	Qwan'tez Stiggers (Toronto Argonauts)
Coach of the Year	Mike O'Shea (Winnipeg Blue Bombers)	Ryan Dinwiddie (Toronto Argonauts)	Ryan Dinwiddie (Toronto Argonauts)

- Tom Pate Memorial Award – Brett Lauther (K), Saskatchewan Roughriders
- Jake Gaudaur Veterans' Trophy – Brayden Lenius (WR), Saskatchewan Roughriders
- Commissioner's Award – Bob Young, Hamilton Tiger-Cats owner
- Hugh Campbell Distinguished Leadership Award – George Hopkins, Calgary Stampeders equipment manager
- Jane Mawby Tribute Award - Laurence Pontbriand, League Office's Senior Manager of Football & Officiating Development
