= Brandin Dandridge =

American gridiron football player (born 1996)

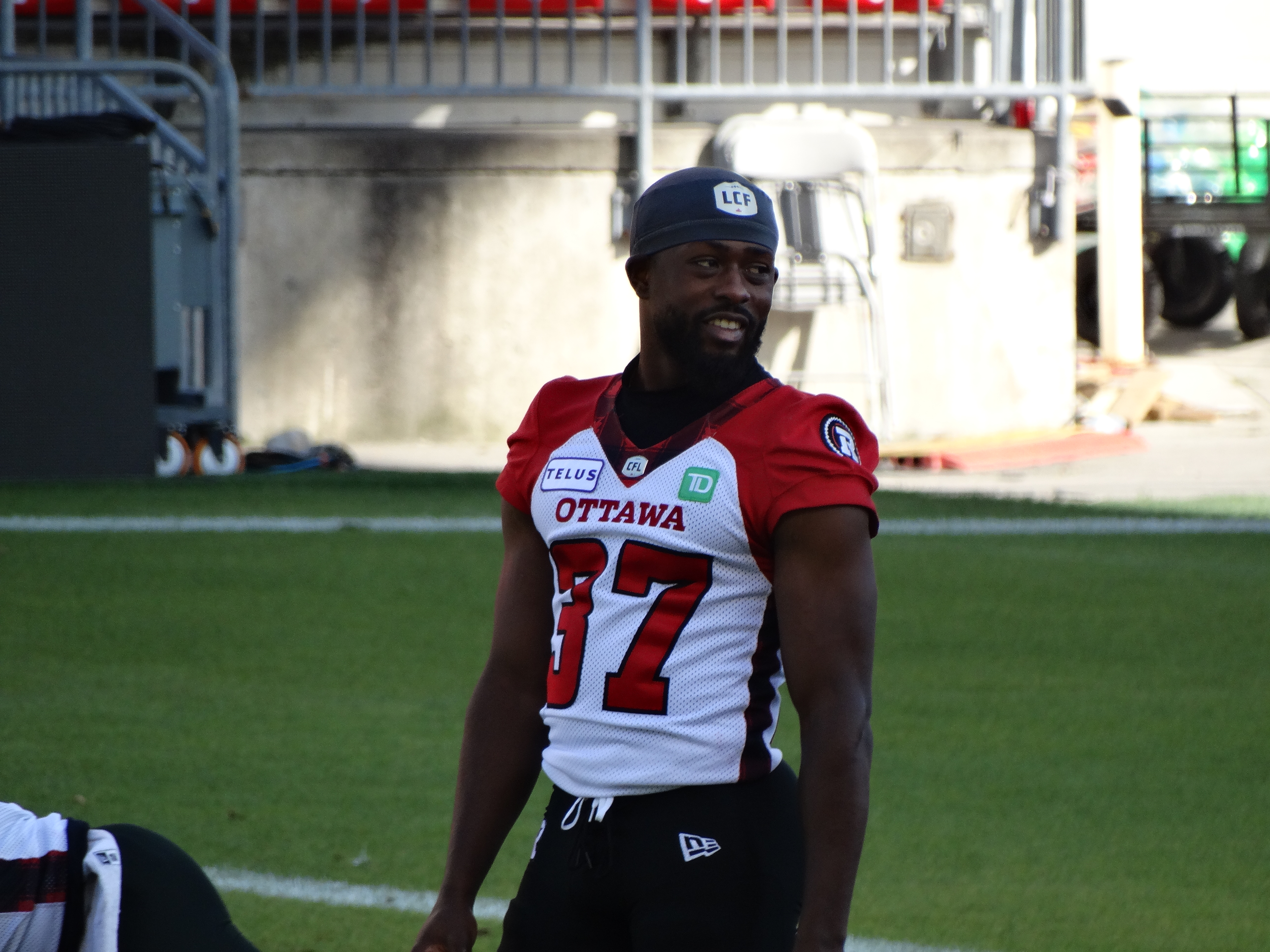
- Dandridge with the Ottawa Redblacks in 2024

Profile
- Position: Defensive back

Personal information
- Born: August 19, 1996 (age 30); Lee's Summit, Missouri, U.S.
- Listed height: 5 ft 10 in (1.78 m)
- Listed weight: 180 lb (82 kg)

Career information
- High school: Blue Springs South (MO)
- College: Missouri Western
- NFL draft: 2019: undrafted

Career history
- Ottawa Redblacks (2019–2021); Kansas City Chiefs (2022)*; Ottawa Redblacks (2022–2024); Montreal Alouettes (2025)
- * Offseason or practice squad member only

Awards and highlights
- CFL East All-Star (2023)

Career CFL statistics
- Games played: 40
- Tackles: 89
- Interceptions: 11
- Interception ret. yards: 109
- Stats at CFL.ca
- Stats at Pro Football Reference

Brandin Dandridge (born August 19, 1996) is an American professional football defensive back. He played college football at Missouri Western.

== Early life ==
Dandridge was born on August 19, 1996, in Lee's Summit, Missouri, and grew up in Des Moines, Iowa. As a youth, he participated in Iowa in baseball, football, and basketball. He mainly played baseball, and later said that "there were people around the fences watching my tee-ball games because I was the only kid there that could hit over the fence home runs." Dandridge said that he "played everywhere in baseball, mainly in the outfield but played 3rd base, pitched and caught too." His family later moved to Missouri and he attended Blue Springs South High School there, playing baseball, football, and track.

== College career ==
Dandridge enrolled at Missouri Western State University, where he spent his first season (2014) as a football redshirt. As a freshman in 2015, he played in 11 games and recorded seven tackles as well as a forced fumble. He was a member of the starting lineup for every game (11) in 2016, and finished the season with a total of 50 tackles, 34 solo, and three interceptions. He also made 12 pass breakups and forced two fumbles, recovering one.

Dandridge earned third-team all-conference honors in 2017 after playing in all 11 games and placing second in the MIAA with four interceptions as well as 14 passes broken up. He produced 41 tackles, of which 29 were solo. He also played on special teams, making eight punt returns for 121 yards, which included a 52-yard return versus Missouri Southern.

Dandridge earned first-team all-conference honors as a returner and second-team as a cornerback in 2018. He led the team with four interceptions and led the conference in passes defended with 15. He started all 12 games and recorded 33 tackles in total, despite being hampered by a knee injury.

== Professional career ==
In his final season at Missouri Western Dandridge's knee injury continued to get worse as the season progressed and led to him going undrafted in the NFL.

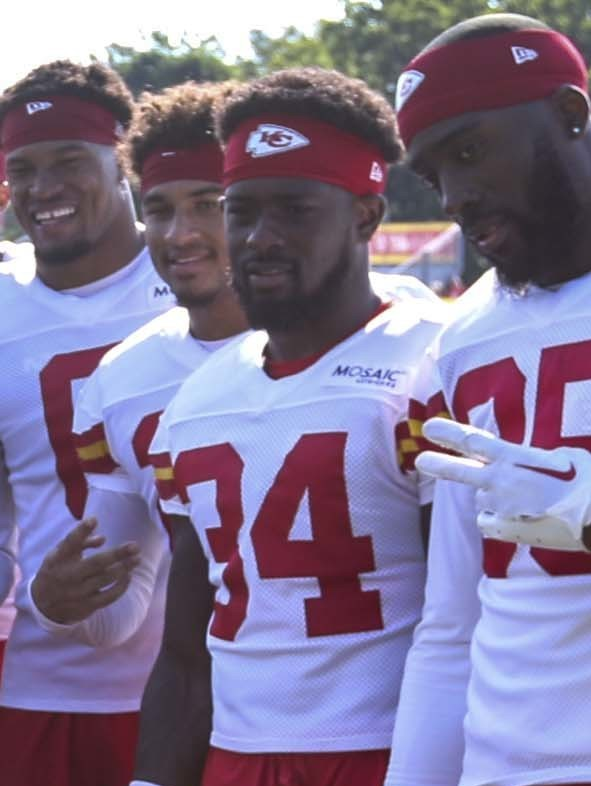
Dandridge with the Kansas City Chiefs in 2022

=== Ottawa Redblacks (first stint) ===
After recovering, Dandridge received his first opportunity in professional football at the June 2019 XFL showcase. Shortly afterwards, he was offered a contract to play in the Canadian Football League (CFL) by the Ottawa Redblacks. He started on the team's practice roster, being signed midway into the season, but was later promoted to the active roster for the year's final four games. In the four games, he recorded 12 tackles and defended two passes. The 2020 CFL season was canceled due to the COVID-19 pandemic. In 2021, he was first signed to the practice roster, then released, then signed back to the practice roster and later promoted to the active roster in September. He played in the final eight games of the season for Ottawa, and made four interceptions for 19 yards and 12 tackles. On November 23, 2021, Dandridge was re-signed by the Redblacks. However, he was granted a release on February 7, 2022, to pursue NFL opportunities.

=== Kansas City Chiefs ===
After tryouts with the Kansas City Chiefs Dandridge was signed to a reserve/futures contract by the Chiefs on February 7, 2022. He was waived on August 22, 2022.

=== Ottawa Redblacks (second stint) ===
On September 6, 2022, Dandridge returned to the Redblacks. He appeared in six games (starting five games at cornerback) to close out the season for the Redblacks, contributing with 14 tackles, two forced fumbles and one touchdown. On February 1, 2023, Dandridge and Ottawa agreed to a one-year contract extension.

Dandridge was released on January 29, 2025.

=== Montreal Alouettes ===
On August 5, 2025, it was announced that Dandridge had signed again with the Montreal Alouettes. He was moved to the practice roster on August 6, and was released on August 12, 2025.
