= Tobias Harris (Canadian football) =

American gridiron football player (born 2000)

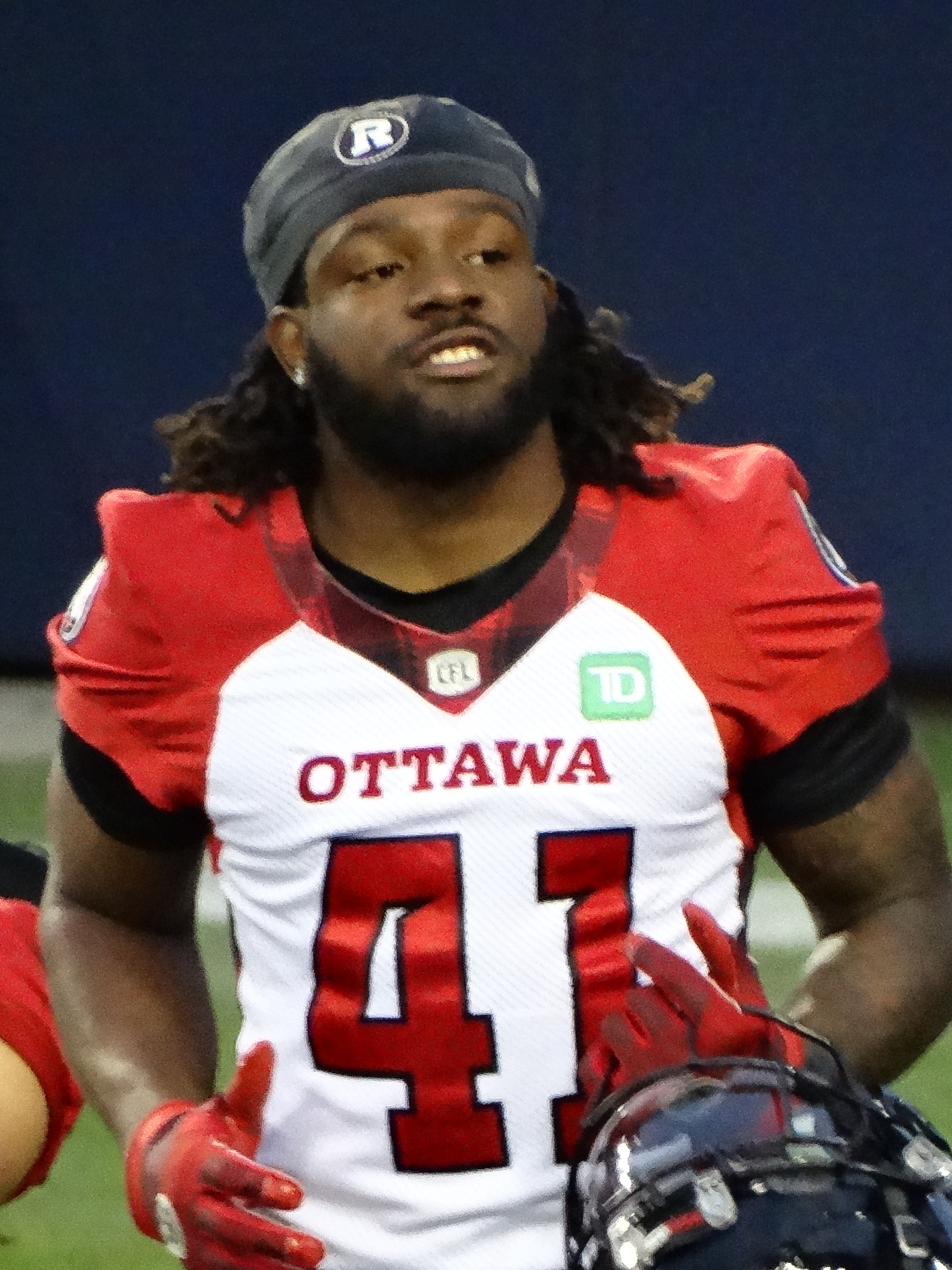
- Harris with the Ottawa Redblacks in 2023

No. 41
- Positions: Defensive back, return specialist

Personal information
- Born: May 24, 2000 (age 26); Pflugerville, Texas, U.S.
- Listed height: 5 ft 7 in (1.70 m)
- Listed weight: 180 lb (82 kg)

Career information
- High school: Hendrickson (Pflugerville)
- College: West Texas A&M, Old Dominion
- NFL draft: 2023: undrafted

Career history
- 2023–2024: Ottawa Redblacks
- Stats at CFL.ca

Tobias Harris (born May 24, 2000) is an American former professional football defensive back and return specialist who played for the Ottawa Redblacks of the Canadian Football League (CFL). He played college football at West Texas A&M and Old Dominion.

== Early life ==
Harris played high school football at Hendrickson High School in Pflugerville, Texas as a defensive back and return specialist. He recorded 111 tackles, six interceptions and 327 punt return yards his senior year, earning all-state honors. He was also a letterman in baseball, basketball, and track and field.

== College career ==
=== West Texas A&M ===
Harris played college football at West Texas A&M from 2018 to 2021.

In 2018, Harris recorded 48 tackles, seven pass breakups and seven interceptions, two of which were returned for touchdowns. He also had 819 return yards and a punt return touchdown. Harris was named the Lone Star Conference (LSC) Freshman of the Year and also earned All-LSC honors. In 2019, he totaled 68 tackles, four interceptions, 436 punt return yards, one punt return touchdown, 571 kick return yards, and one kick return touchdown. He started two games in the COVID-19 shortened 2020 season. In 2021, Harris accumulated 40 tackles three pass breakups, one fumble recovery, and six interceptions, two of which were returned for touchdowns.

=== Old Dominion ===
Harris transferred to play for Old Dominion in 2022. He started 12 games at cornerback during his lone season at Old Dominion, totaling 44 tackles, one sack, one interception, and 11 pass breakups.

== Professional career ==
Pre-draft measurables
| Height | Weight | Arm length | Hand span | Wingspan | 40-yard dash | 10-yard split | 20-yard split | 20-yard shuttle | Three-cone drill | Vertical jump | Broad jump | Bench press |
|---|---|---|---|---|---|---|---|---|---|---|---|---|
| 5 ft 7 in (1.70 m) | 176 lb (80 kg) | 31 in (0.79 m) | 9 3/4 in (0.25 m) | 6 ft 2 in (1.88 m) | 4.51 s | 1.55 s | 2.53 s | 4.21 s | 6.87 s | 37.0 in (0.94 m) | 9 ft 8 in (2.95 m) | 10 reps |
All values from Pro Day

Harris was signed by the Ottawa Redblacks of the Canadian Football League (CFL) on February 21, 2023, but was released with the final cuts on June 3, 2023. He was signed to the Redblacks' practice roster on August 1, 2023, and promoted to the active roster on August 5, 2023. Harris dressed in 10 games for the Redblacks in 2023 as a return specialist, returning 38 kickoffs for 867 yards and one touchdown while also returning 24 punts for 326 yards.

Harris scored an 101-yard pick-six during the final preseason game of 2024. He was placed on the six-game injured list on July 22, 2024. He was activated on September 27 and moved to the practice roster on October 17. He dressed in eight games, starting six at defensive back, overall during the 2024 season, recording 21 defensive tackles, one special teams tackle, one forced fumble, 16 punt returns for 191 yards, nine kickoff returns for 175 yards, and two missed field goal returns for 80 yards. Harris re-signed with the Redblacks on November 18, 2024. He retired on May 25, 2025, for medical reasons.
