= Demerio Houston =

American gridiron football player (born 1996)

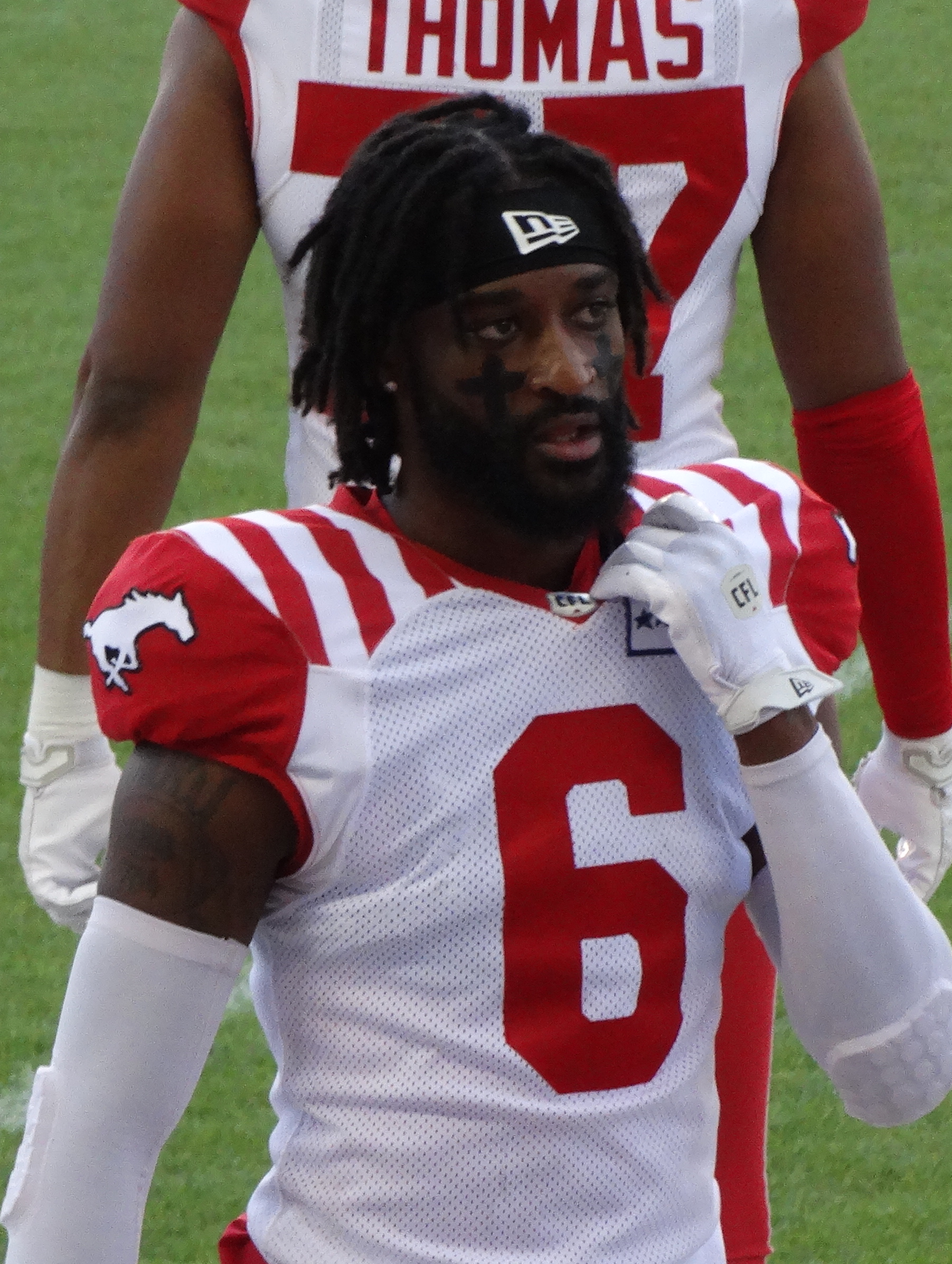
- Houston with the Calgary Stampeders in 2024

Profile
- Position: Defensive back

Personal information
- Born: September 3, 1996 (age 30); Shelby, North Carolina, U.S.
- Listed height: 5 ft 10 in (1.78 m)
- Listed weight: 169 lb (77 kg)

Career information
- High school: Shelby High
- College: Southern (2015–2018)
- NFL draft: 2019: undrafted

Career history
- Winnipeg Blue Bombers (2020–2023); Calgary Stampeders (2024); Winnipeg Blue Bombers (2025); Ottawa Redblacks (2026–present)

Awards and highlights
- Grey Cup champion (2021); CFL All-Star (2023); CFL West All-Star (2023)
- Stats at CFL.ca

Demerio Houston (born September 3, 1996) is an American professional football defensive back.

== College career ==
Houston played college football for the Southern Jaguars from 2015 to 2018.

== Professional career ==
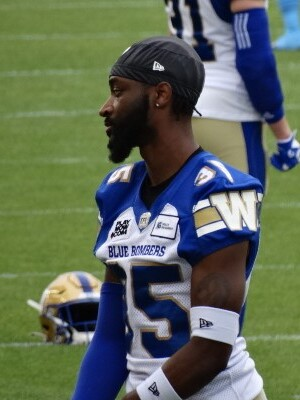
Houston with the Winnipeg Blue Bombers in 2022

=== Winnipeg Blue Bombers (first stint) ===
On October 22, 2019, Houston signed a futures contract for the 2020 season with the Winnipeg Blue Bombers. However, the 2020 CFL season was cancelled and he did not play in 2020.

Houston began the 2021 season on the practice roster following training camp, but made his professional debut on October 15, 2021, against the Edmonton Elks, where he had three defensive tackles. He played in four regular season games for the team where he had seven defensive tackles and three special teams tackles. He was placed back on the practice roster for the post-season as the Blue Bombers won the 108th Grey Cup and Houston became a Grey Cup champion in his rookie year.

In 2022, Houston made the team's active roster following training camp and played as a backup for the Blue Bombers' first two games. Following an injury to Winston Rose, he started at cornerback in the third game where his six-tackle performance made veteran Tyquwan Glass expendable, who was released in favour of keeping Houston in the starting lineup. Two weeks later, on July 9, 2022, he recorded his first career interception on a pass from Michael O'Connor in a game against the BC Lions. In the following week, on July 15, 2022, he recorded a victory-clinching, diving interception in the final minute of the game against the Calgary Stampeders. He played in 11 regular season games where he had 27 defensive tackles and two interceptions..

In the 2023 season, Houston played in 15 regular season games where he had a league-leading seven interceptions along with 50 defensive tackles and three fumble recoveries. He became a free agent upon the expiry of his contract on February 13, 2024.

=== Calgary Stampeders ===
On February 13, 2024, it was announced that Houston had signed a two-year contract with the Calgary Stampeders. He played in 15 regular season games where he had 74 defensive tackles, one sacks, five interceptions, and one forced fumble. After being charged with domestic violence in North Carolina, Demerio was released by the Stampeders on February 12, 2025.

=== Winnipeg Blue Bombers (second stint) ===
On August 17, 2025, it was announced that Houston had signed back with the Winnipeg Blue Bombers on their practice roster. He became a free agent upon the expiry of his contract on February 10, 2026.

=== Ottawa Redblacks ===
On February 10, 2026, it was announced that Houston had signed with the Ottawa Redblacks.

== Personal life ==
Houston and his wife, Ashley, have five children.
