= Woody Baron =

American gridiron football player (born 1993)

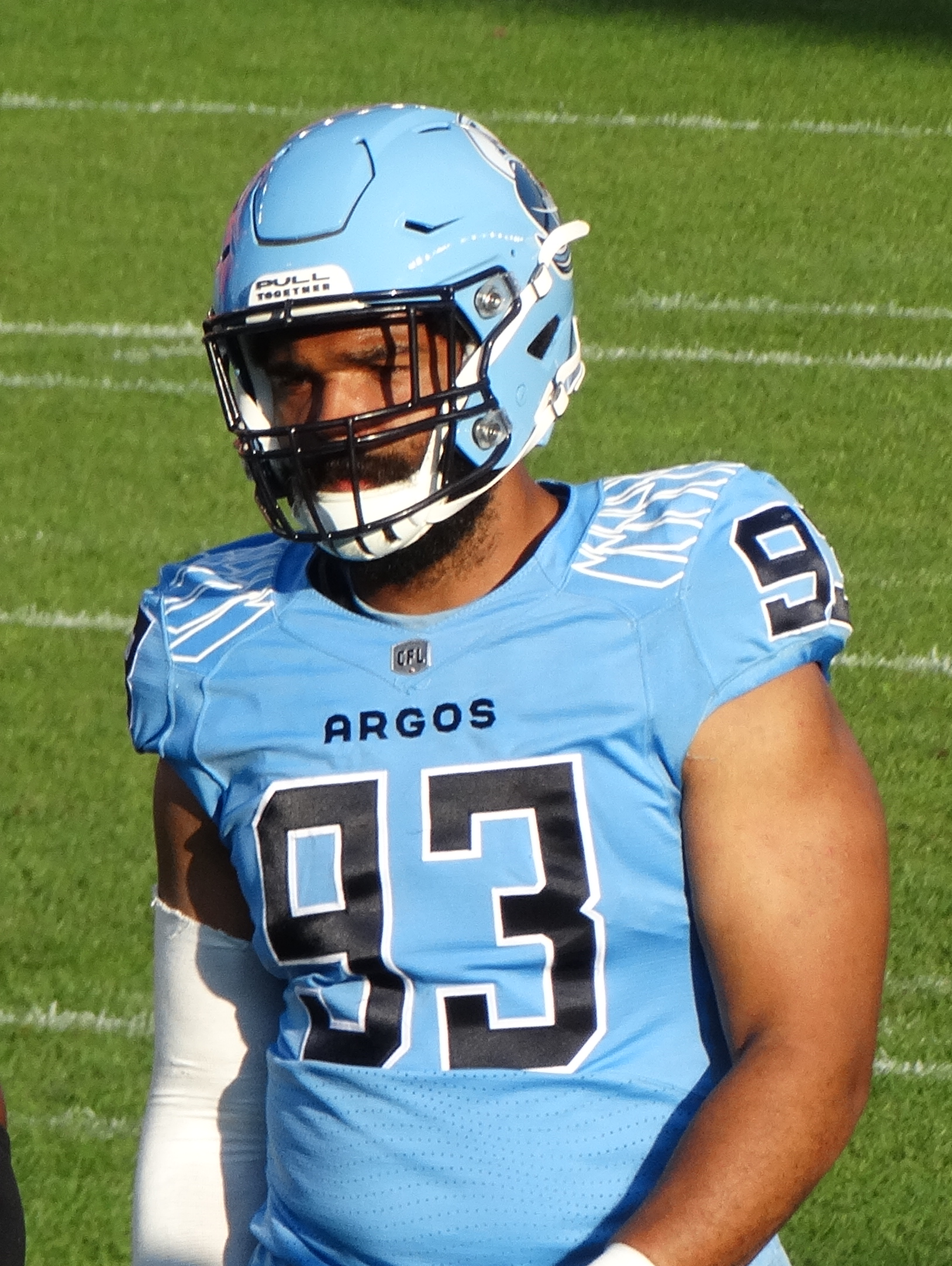
- Baron with the Toronto Argonauts in 2024

Profile
- Position: Defensive lineman

Personal information
- Born: August 8, 1993 (age 33); Chicago, Illinois, U.S.
- Listed height: 6 ft 1 in (1.85 m)
- Listed weight: 270 lb (122 kg)

Career information
- High school: Brentwood Academy
- College: Virginia Tech

Career history
- 2017: Dallas Cowboys*
- 2018–2021: Montreal Alouettes
- 2022–2023: BC Lions
- 2024: Toronto Argonauts
- * Offseason or practice squad member only

Awards and highlights
- Grey Cup champion (2024); CFL West All-Star (2023); All-ACC (2016)
- Stats at Pro Football Reference
- Stats at CFL.ca

Woody Baron (born August 8, 1993) is an American professional football defensive lineman. He previously played in the Canadian Football League (CFL). He played college football at Virginia Tech.

== Early life ==
Baron attended Brentwood Academy. As a senior, he received his second straight first-team All-state selection, after tallying 40 tackles (15 for loss) and 8 sacks.

== College career ==
Baron accepted a football scholarship from Virginia Tech. As a true freshman, he appeared in all 13 games as a backup defensive tackle. He collected 8 tackles.

As a sophomore, he appeared in 12 games with 2 starts, making 7 tackles (one for a loss), and a half sack.

As a junior, he appeared in all 13 games with 5 starts. He registered 28 tackles (8 for loss), 3 sacks, 2 forced fumbles and one fumble recovery.

As a senior, he started all 14 games, posting 56 tackles, 18.5 tackles for loss (tied for the team lead) and 5.5 sacks. He had 6 tackles (4.5 for loss) and 2.5 sacks against the University of Miami. He was part of a defense that ranked second among Power Five squads in third-down defense (27.5%), fourth in tackles for loss (113.0) and fifth in opponent completion percentage (50.1%).

He played in 52 games, starting in 21 of them, where he had 99 tackles (27.5 for loss), 9 sacks, two forced fumbles, and three fumble recoveries.

== Professional career ==
=== Dallas Cowboys ===
Baron was signed as an undrafted free agent by the Dallas Cowboys after the 2017 NFL draft on May 2. However, he was released at the end of training camp on September 2, 2017.

=== Montreal Alouettes ===
On March 19, 2018, Baron signed with the Montreal Alouettes. He made the team's active roster following training camp and played in his first professional game on June 16, 2018, against the BC Lions, where he had two defensive tackles. He played in all 18 regular season games in 2018 where he recorded 28 defensive tackles and four sacks.

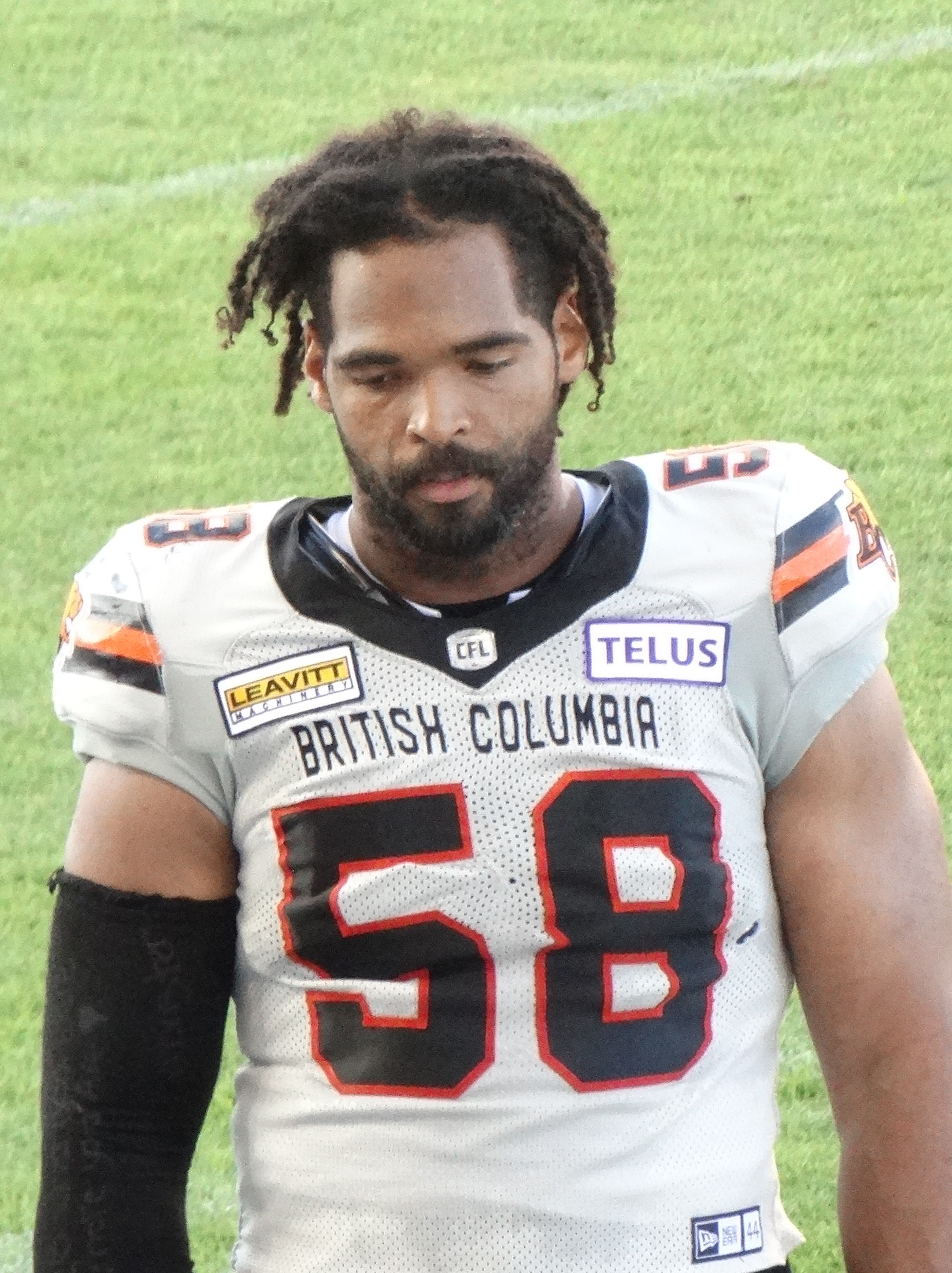
Baron with the BC Lions in 2023

In 2019, Baron again played in all 18 regular season games where he had 27 defensive tackles and one sack. He made his post-season debut in the team's East Semi-Final loss to the Edmonton Eskimos where he had two defensive tackles and his first career interception. He did not play in 2020 due to the cancellation of the 2020 CFL season. He played in all 14 regular season games in the shortened 2021 season where he had 16 defensive tackles and a career-high six sacks. He became a free agent upon the expiry of his contract on February 8, 2022.

=== BC Lions ===
On February 14, 2022, it was announced that Baron had signed with the BC Lions. However, his debut with the Lions was delayed due to complications following surgery for his ankle and he began the season on the six-game injured list. He played in his first game with the Lions on September 24, 2022. He played in just six regular season games where he had seven defensive tackles and one sack.

In 2023, Baron played in 17 regular season games where he had a career-high eight sacks along with 22 defensive tackles, two pass knockdowns, one forced fumble, and a blocked kick. He was then named a CFL Division All-Star for the first time in his career. Despite his productive season, Baron was released by the Lions on February 8, 2024.

=== Toronto Argonauts ===
On July 17, 2024, it was announced that Baron had signed with the Toronto Argonauts. After spending one week on the practice roster, he made his Argonaut debut on July 27, 2024, against the Winnipeg Blue Bombers, where he had one defensive tackle and one sack. He played in five regular season games, where he recorded three defensive tackles, one sack, and one pass knockdown. However, he was placed on the injured list for the team's 12th game of the year and remained on the six-game injured list when the Argonauts' defeated the Blue Bombers in the 111th Grey Cup. He became a free agent upon the expiry of his contract on February 11, 2025.

== Personal life ==
Baron's uncle, James Baron, played in 12 seasons in the Arena Football League as a defensive lineman. In August 2018, he released a children's book that he co-authored with his uncle and Henry Taylor.
