= Alijah McGhee =

American gridiron football player (born 1999)

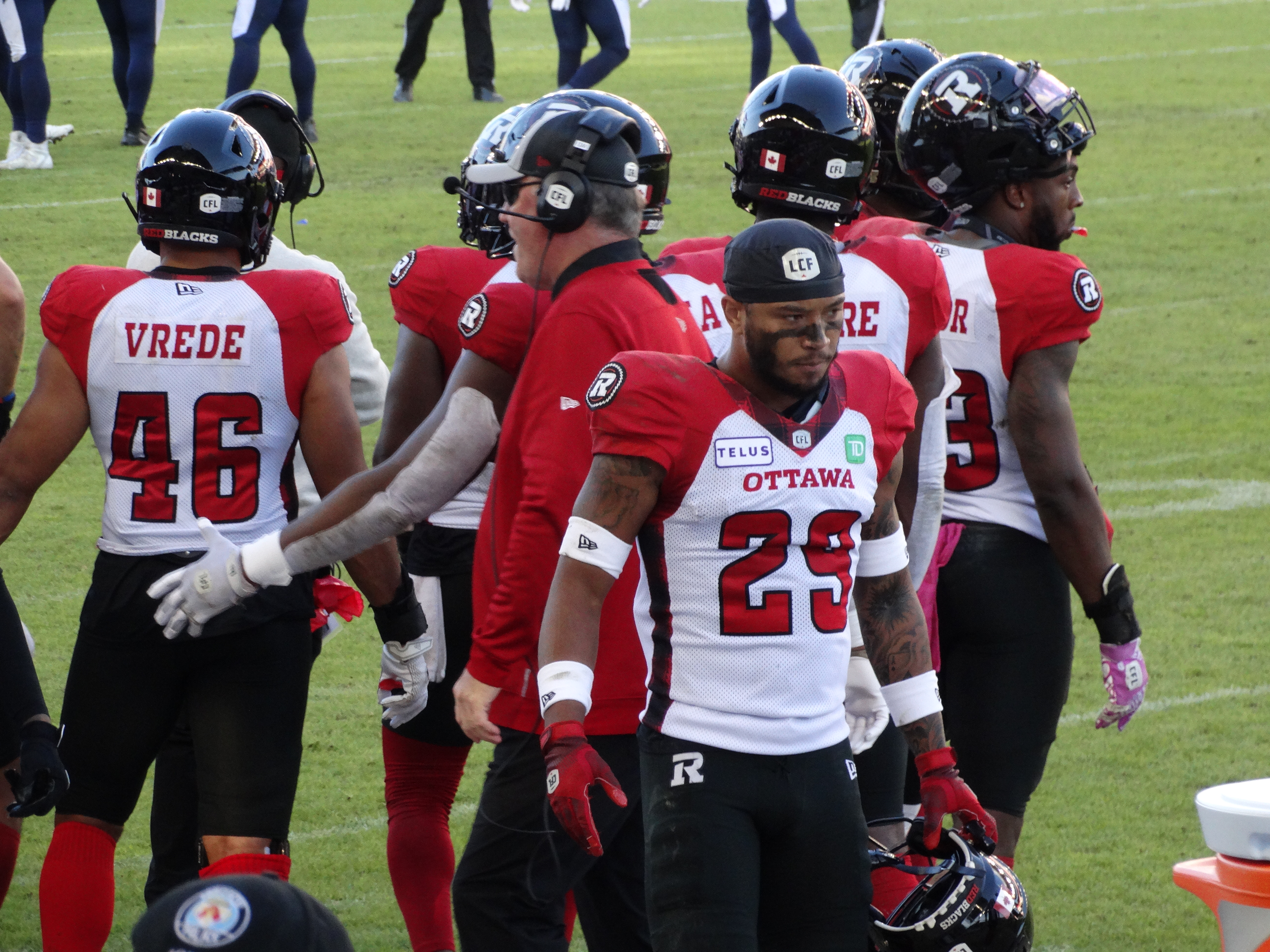
- McGhee with the Ottawa Redblacks in 2024

Profile
- Position: Defensive back

Personal information
- Born: October 13, 1999 (age 27)
- Listed height: 6 ft 2 in (1.88 m)
- Listed weight: 195 lb (88 kg)

Career information
- High school: Northside (Warner Robins, GA)
- College: Kentucky Wesleyan (2018–2020); Minnesota State-Mankato (2021–2022)
- NFL draft: 2023: undrafted

Career history
- Ottawa Redblacks (2023–2025); Winnipeg Blue Bombers (2025)

Awards and highlights
- Second-team All-NSIC (2022)

Career CFL statistics as of 2025
- Total tackles: 75
- Interceptions: 4
- Forced fumbles: 2
- Defensive touchdowns: 1
- Stats at CFL.ca

Alijah McGhee (born October 13, 1999) is an American professional football defensive back. He played college football at Minnesota State-Mankato and Kentucky Wesleyan. McGhee has also been a member of the Ottawa Redblacks.

== College career ==
McGhee played college football for the Kentucky Wesleyan Panthers from 2018 to 2020, and the Minnesota State-Mankato Mavericks from 2021 to 2022. He played in 25 games at Kentucky Wesleyan where he had 82 tackles and 14 passes defended. In 2021 McGhee transferred to Minnesota State-Mankato where he played in 21 games logging 80 total tackles, two interceptions, 11 passes defended, one fumble recovery and two blocked kicks.

As a senior, McGhee was named D2Football.com Defensive Player of the Week and NSIC Defensive Player of the Week for his performance against Bemidji State where he scored a 70-yard fumble recovery for a touchdown and a 45-yard pick-six in the first half. He was also named to the All-NSIC Second team.

== Professional career ==
=== Houston Roughnecks ===
McGhee was selected in the 2023 XFL rookie draft by the Houston Roughnecks but did not sign with the team.

=== Ottawa Redblacks ===
On August 24, 2023, it was announced that the Ottawa Redblacks had signed McGhee to the practice squad. On October 14, McGhee would be signed to the active roster and make his first game appearance for the Redblacks against the Toronto Argonauts and recorded one tackle. In his next game, the final game of the season against Toronto, he finished with five tackles, one forced fumble and fumble recovery.

McGhee played in 12 games in the 2024 season, starting in all. He began the season on the six-game IR list due to a foot injury. McGhee finished the season with 44 tackles, three interceptions and one forced fumble.

On January 21, 2025, it was announced that McGhee had re-signed to the Redblacks on a one-year contract. He was released on August 31, 2025. McGhee finished the season with 25 tackles, one interception, and one touchdown in six games.

=== Winnipeg Blue Bombers ===
On November 17, 2025, the Winnipeg Blue Bombers signed McGhee.

On May 13, 2026, McGhee was released by the Blue Bombers.
