= Mason Pierce =

American gridiron football player (born 1999)

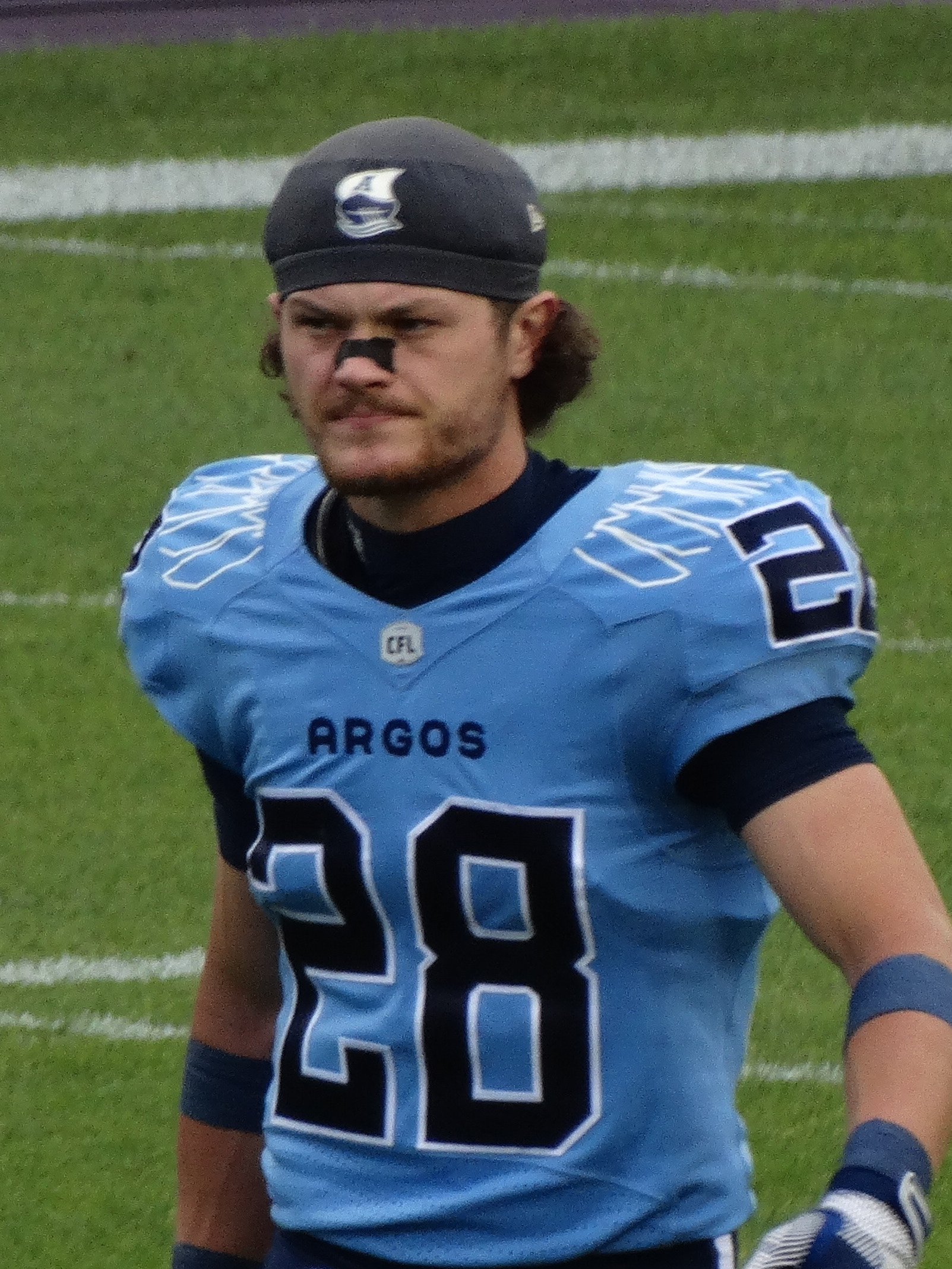
- Pierce with the Toronto Argonauts in 2024

Profile
- Position: Defensive back

Personal information
- Born: March 20, 1999 (age 27); Bulverde, Texas, U.S.
- Listed height: 5 ft 10 in (1.78 m)
- Listed weight: 185 lb (84 kg)

Career information
- High school: Smithson Valley High
- College: Colorado Mines (2018–2022)

Career history
- 2023–2024: Toronto Argonauts
- Stats at CFL.ca

Mason Pierce (born March 20, 1999) is an American professional football defensive back who is a free agent. He most recently played for the Toronto Argonauts of the Canadian Football League (CFL).

== College career ==
Pierce played college football for the Colorado Mines Orediggers from 2018 to 2022. He played in 49 games where he recorded 180 tackles, 53 pass deflections, and six interceptions while also returning 40 punts for 638 yards.

== Professional career ==
Pierce signed with the Toronto Argonauts on May 8, 2023. Following training camp, he began the 2023 season on the practice roster, but made his professional debut on September 4, 2023, in the Labour Day Classic against the Hamilton Tiger-Cats, where he recorded four defensive tackles. Due to injuries to teammates DaShaun Amos and Robertson Daniel, he made his first professional start on September 15, 2023, against the Montreal Alouettes where he had eight defensive tackles. He played in nine regular season games, starting in seven, where he had 32 defensive tackles, three pass knockdowns, one sack, one forced fumble, and three interceptions, including one returned for a touchdown.

In 2024, Pierce was an opening day starter on defence. However, inconsistent play led to his demotion to the practice roster in the team's fifth game of the season. He returned as a backup in the following week and was a starter again for the three weeks after, but was again sent to the practice roster for the team's week 12 matchup against the Saskatchewan Roughriders. He played in eight games, recording 29 defensive tackles and one sack before being released on August 31, 2024.
