= Bryce Carter =

American gridiron football player (born 1998)

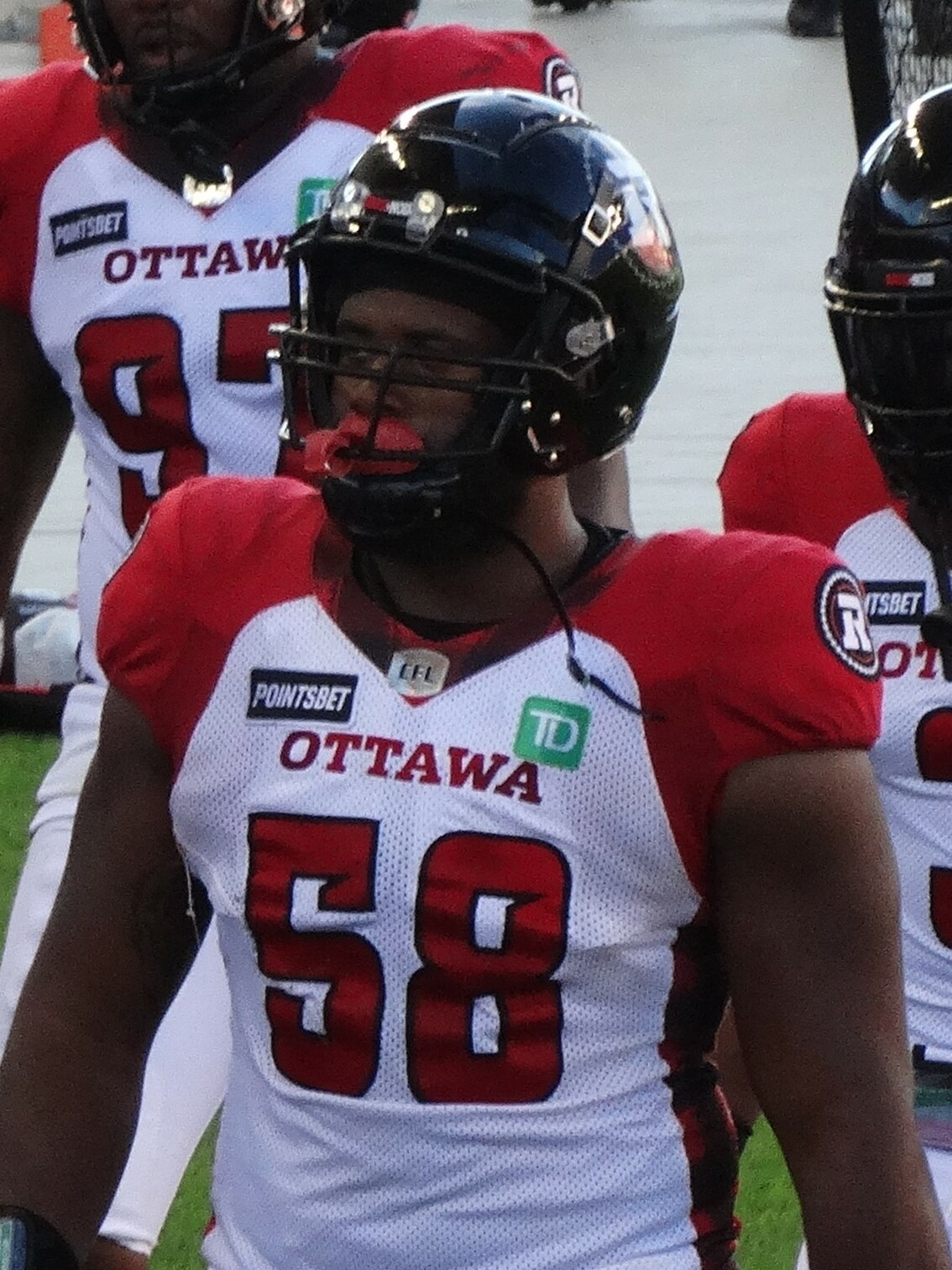
- Carter with the Ottawa Redblacks in 2022

No. 58 – Ottawa Redblacks
- Position: Defensive end
- Roster status: 6-game injured list
- CFL status: American

Personal information
- Born: March 25, 1998 (age 28); Steelton, Pennsylvania, U.S.
- Listed height: 6 ft 0 in (1.83 m)
- Listed weight: 250 lb (113 kg)

Career information
- High school: Steelton-Highspire
- College: James Madison; Towson

Career history
- Ottawa Redblacks (2022–present)

Awards and highlights
- CFL East All-Star (2023)
- Stats at CFL.ca

Bryce Carter (born March 25, 1998) is an American professional football defensive lineman for the Ottawa Redblacks of the Canadian Football League (CFL).

== College career ==
After using a redshirt year in 2016, Carter played college football for the Towson Tigers from 2017 to 2019. He played in 35 games for the Tigers, starting in 24, where he had 144 tackles, 15 sacks, and six forced fumbles. He then transferred to James Madison University to play for the Dukes in 2021, where he played in 14 games and had 54 tackles, nine sacks, and three forced fumbles.

== Professional career ==
Pre-draft measurables
Height	Weight	Arm length	Hand span	Wingspan	40-yard dash	10-yard split	20-yard split	20-yard shuttle	Three-cone drill	Vertical jump	Broad jump	Bench press
5 ft 11 3/4 in (1.82 m)	250 lb (113 kg)	32 in (0.81 m)	9 1/8 in (0.23 m)	6 ft 5 1/4 in (1.96 m)	4.94 s	1.63 s	2.82 s	4.60 s	7.60 s	31.0 in (0.79 m)	8 ft 10 in (2.69 m)	25 reps
All values from Pro Day

On May 21, 2022, it was announced that Carter had signed with the Ottawa Redblacks. He made his professional debut on July 21, 2022, against the Montreal Alouettes, where he recorded two defensive tackles. He played in six regular season games in 2022, where he had ten defensive tackles and two sacks. On December 18, 2024, Carter and the Redblacks agreed to a two-year deal, locking him in through 2026.

== Personal life ==
Carter was born to parents James Carter and Lisa Lewis.
