= Titus Wall =

American football player (born 1999)

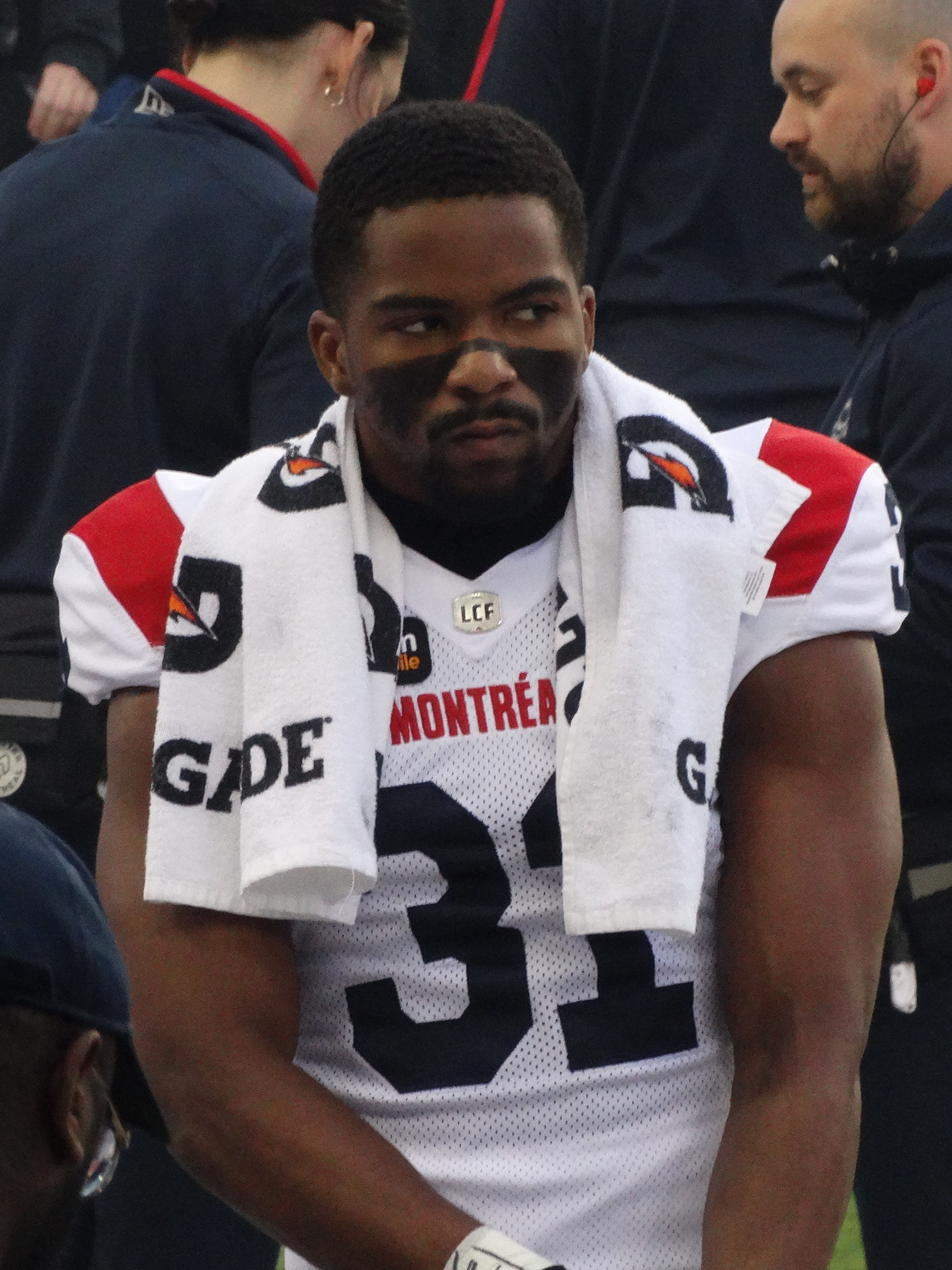
- Wall with the Montreal Alouettes in 2024

No. 32, 31
- Position: Defensive back

Personal information
- Born: May 8, 1999 (age 27); Lima, Ohio, U.S.
- Listed height: 6 ft 0 in (1.83 m)
- Listed weight: 200 lb (91 kg)

Career information
- High school: Plano West (Plano, Texas)
- College: Missouri State (2017–2021)
- NFL draft: 2022: undrafted

Career history
- 2022–2023: Calgary Stampeders
- 2024: Montreal Alouettes
- Stats at CFL.ca

Titus Wall (born May 8, 1999) is an American former professional football defensive back who played in the Canadian Football League (CFL) with the Calgary Stampeders and Montreal Alouettes. He played college football for the Missouri State Bears.

== Early life ==
Titus Wall was born on May 8, 1999, in Lima, Ohio. He played high school football at Plano West Senior High School in Plano, Texas. He recorded 88 tackles and four forced fumbles his junior year in 2015. He totaled 110 tackles, three sacks and four forced fumbles in 2016.

== College career ==
Wall played college football at Missouri State from 2017 to 2021. He played in 11 games, starting one, in 2017, accumulating 27 tackles. He appeared in 11 games in 2018, recording 50 tackles. Wall started 11 games in 2019 and was a team captain, recording 58 tackles. He played in nine games in 2020 and was a team captain again, totaling 53 tackles. He was a captain for the third consecutive year in 2021 and appeared in 12 games, accumulating 74 tackles, one sack, one interception, and five pass breakups, earning honorable mention All-Missouri Valley Football Conference honors. Wall was the first three-time captain in team history. He played in 54 career games for Missouri State, recording 262 tackles, one sack, one interception, eight pass breakups and two fumble recoveries.

== Professional career ==
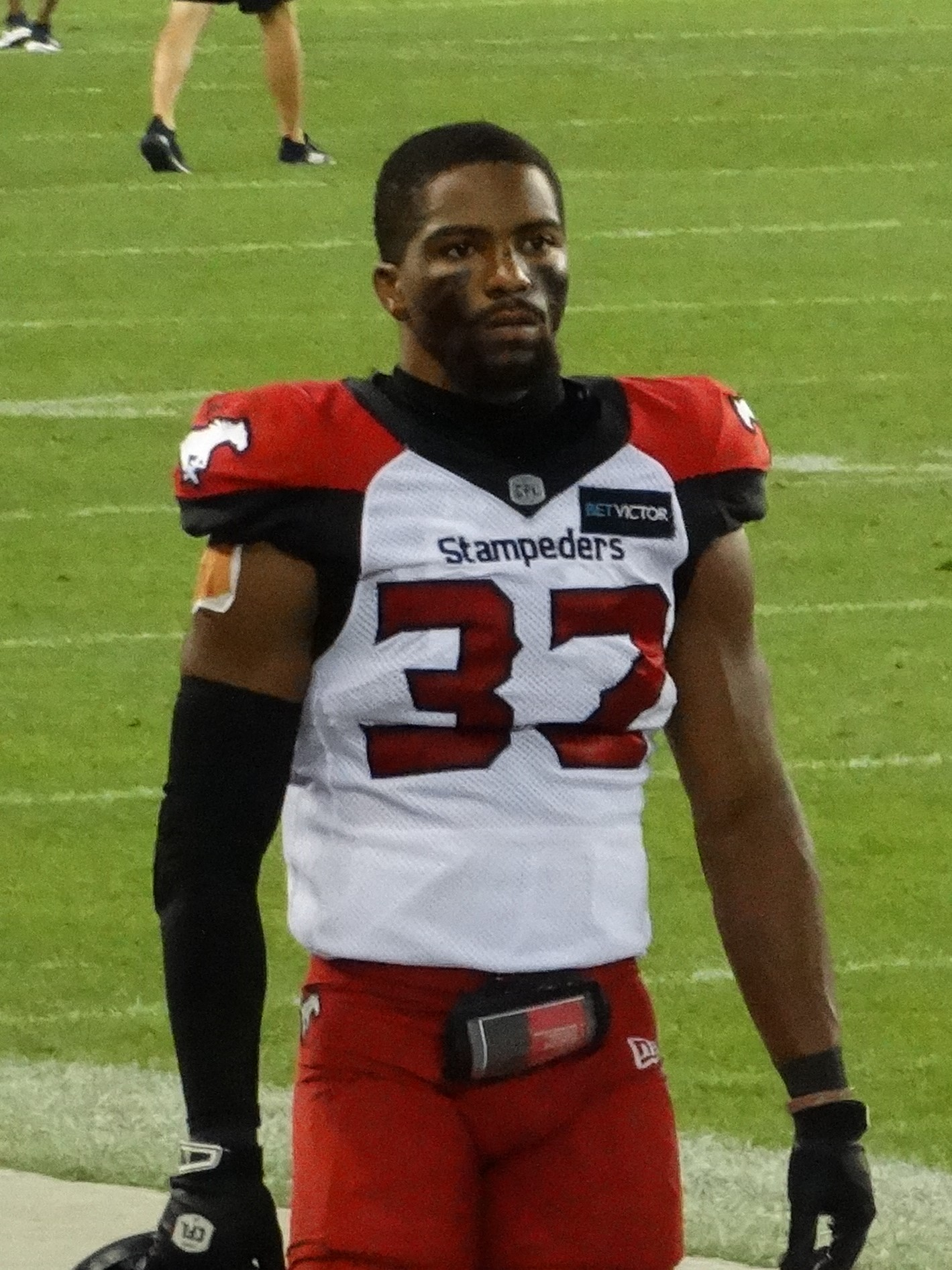
Wall with the Calgary Stampeders in 2022

=== Calgary Stampeders ===
Wall was signed by the Calgary Stampeders of the Canadian Football League (CFL) on April 11, 2022. He was moved to the practice roster on June 5, promoted to the active roster on June 8, placed on injured reserve on August 24, and activated from injured serve on October 28, 2022. Overall, Wall played in 10 games, all starts, for the Stampeders in 2022, totaling 39 tackles on defense, three special teams tackle, two sacks, three interceptions (one of which was returned for a touchdown), two forced fumbles and one fumble recovery that was returned for a touchdown. He was named the CFL's Top Performer of the Week for Week 2 of the 2022 season, and was also named the third-best performer for Week 9.

Wall was placed on injured reserve on June 23, 2023, activated on July 6, and placed on injured reserve again on September 8, 2023. Overall, he appeared in 11 games, all starts, in 2023, accumulating 54 tackles on defense, seven special teams tackles and two sacks. He re-signed with the team on February 1, 2024. Wall was released by the Stampeders on June 2, 2024.

=== Montreal Alouettes ===
Wall was signed to the practice squad of the Montreal Alouettes on June 18, 2024. He was later promoted to the active roster and dressed in 11 games for the Alouettes during the 2024 season, posting 21 defensive tackles and four special teams tackles.
