= Deontez Alexander =

American football player (born 1996)

No. 80, 81
- Position: Wide receiver

Personal information
- Born: July 25, 1996 (age 30); Indianapolis, Indiana, U.S.
- Listed height: 6 ft 1 in (1.85 m)
- Listed weight: 196 lb (89 kg)

Career information
- High school: Manual (Indianapolis)
- College: Franklin
- NFL draft: 2018: undrafted

Career history
- 2018–2019: Detroit Lions*
- 2020: Houston Roughnecks*
- 2020–2021: Winnipeg Blue Bombers*
- 2022: Seattle Seahawks*
- 2023: Houston Gamblers
- 2023: Edmonton Elks
- * Offseason or practice squad member only

Awards and highlights
- First-team All-HCAC (2016–2017)
- Stats at Pro Football Reference
- Stats at CFL.ca

Deontez Alexander (born July 25, 1996) is an American former professional football wide receiver. He played college football for the Franklin Grizzlies. He was a member of the Detroit Lions and Seattle Seahawks of the National Football League (NFL), the Houston Roughnecks of the XFL, the Houston Gamblers of the United States Football League (USFL), and the Winnipeg Blue Bombers and Edmonton Elks of the Canadian Football League (CFL).

== Early life ==
Alexander played high school football at Emmerich Manual High School in Indianapolis, Indiana.

== College career ==
Alexander played college football at Franklin College from 2014 to 2017. He played in 10 games in 2014, catching 12 passes for 150 yards and two touchdowns. He appeared in 9 games in 2015, recording 37 receptions for 783 yards and 12 touchdowns. Alexander played in 10 games in 2016, totaling 64 receptions for 996 yards and 15 touchdowns, earning first team All-HCAC honors. He appeared in 11 games in 2017, catching 50 passes for 1,137 yards and 18 touchdowns, garnering first ream All-HCAC recognition and finishing second in Division III in touchdown catches.

== Professional career ==
=== Detroit Lions ===
Alexander signed with the Detroit Lions of the National Football League (NFL) on May 14, 2018, after going undrafted in the 2018 NFL draft. He was waived/injured on August 3, reverted to injured reserve on August 4, and waived from injured reserve on August 9, 2018. He was signed to the practice roster of the Lions on November 30, released by the team on December 14, and re-signed to the practice squad on December 22, 2018. Alexander signed a futures contract with the Lions on December 31, 2018.

He was released on August 4, 2019, re-signed by the team on August 11, and released again on August 26, 2019.

=== Houston Roughnecks ===
In October 2019, Alexander was selected by the Houston Roughnecks of the XFL in the fifth round, with the 34th overall pick, in the skill players portion of the 2020 XFL draft. He was released by the Roughnecks on January 22, 2020.

=== Winnipeg Blue Bombers ===
Alexander signed with the Winnipeg Blue Bombers of the Canadian Football League (CFL) on February 10, 2020. The 2020 CFL season was cancelled due to the COVID-19 pandemic. He re-signed with the Blue Bombers on January 29, 2021. He was released on July 30, 2021.

=== Seattle Seahawks ===
Alexander was signed by the Seattle Seahawks of the NFL on May 13, 2022. He was released on August 16, 2022.

=== Houston Gamblers ===
Alexander signed with the Houston Gamblers of the United States Football League (USFL) on September 17, 2022. He played in four games for the Gamblers in 2023, catching five passes for 27 yards while also returning eight kickoffs for 213 yards. He was released on May 19, 2023.

=== Edmonton Elks ===
Alexander was signed to the practice roster of the Edmonton Elks of the CFL on September 6, 2023. He was later promoted to the active roster and dressed in two games for the Elks in 2023, returning 11 kickoffs for 291 yards and one touchdown while also recording three special teams tackles. He was released on June 3, 2024.
