= Quincy Mauger =

American gridiron football player (born 1995)

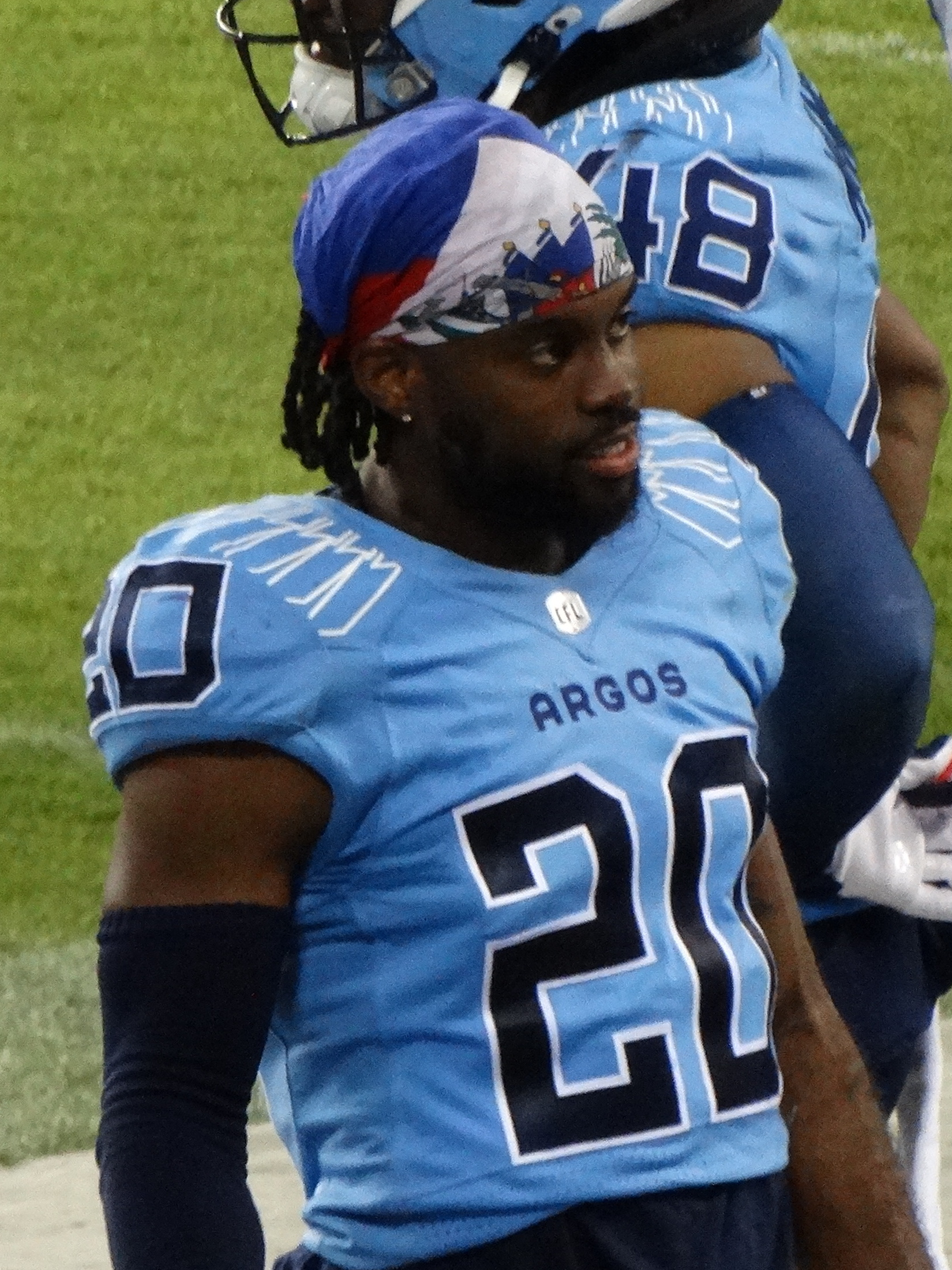
- Mauger with the Toronto Argonauts in 2024

Profile
- Position: Defensive back

Personal information
- Born: March 4, 1995 (age 31); Marietta, Georgia, U.S.
- Listed height: 6 ft 0 in (1.83 m)
- Listed weight: 206 lb (93 kg)

Career information
- High school: Carlton J. Kell (Marietta, Georgia)
- College: Georgia
- NFL draft: 2017: undrafted

Career history
- Atlanta Falcons (2017); Oakland Raiders (2018)*; Atlanta Legends (2019); BC Lions (2022–2023); Toronto Argonauts (2024)
- * Offseason or practice squad member only

Awards and highlights
- Grey Cup champion (2024)

Career CFL statistics
- Games played: 34
- Defensive tackles: 94
- Sacks: 5
- Interceptions: 2
- Stats at Pro Football Reference

Quincy Mauger (/moʊˈʒeɪ/; born March 4, 1995) is an American professional football defensive back. He most recently played for the Toronto Argonauts of the Canadian Football League (CFL). He played college football at Georgia and signed with the Atlanta Falcons as an undrafted free agent in 2017.

== Professional career ==
=== Atlanta Falcons ===
Mauger signed with the Atlanta Falcons as an undrafted free agent on May 1, 2017. He was waived/injured by the Falcons on September 2, 2017 and placed on injured reserve. On June 11, 2018, Mauger was waived by the Falcons.

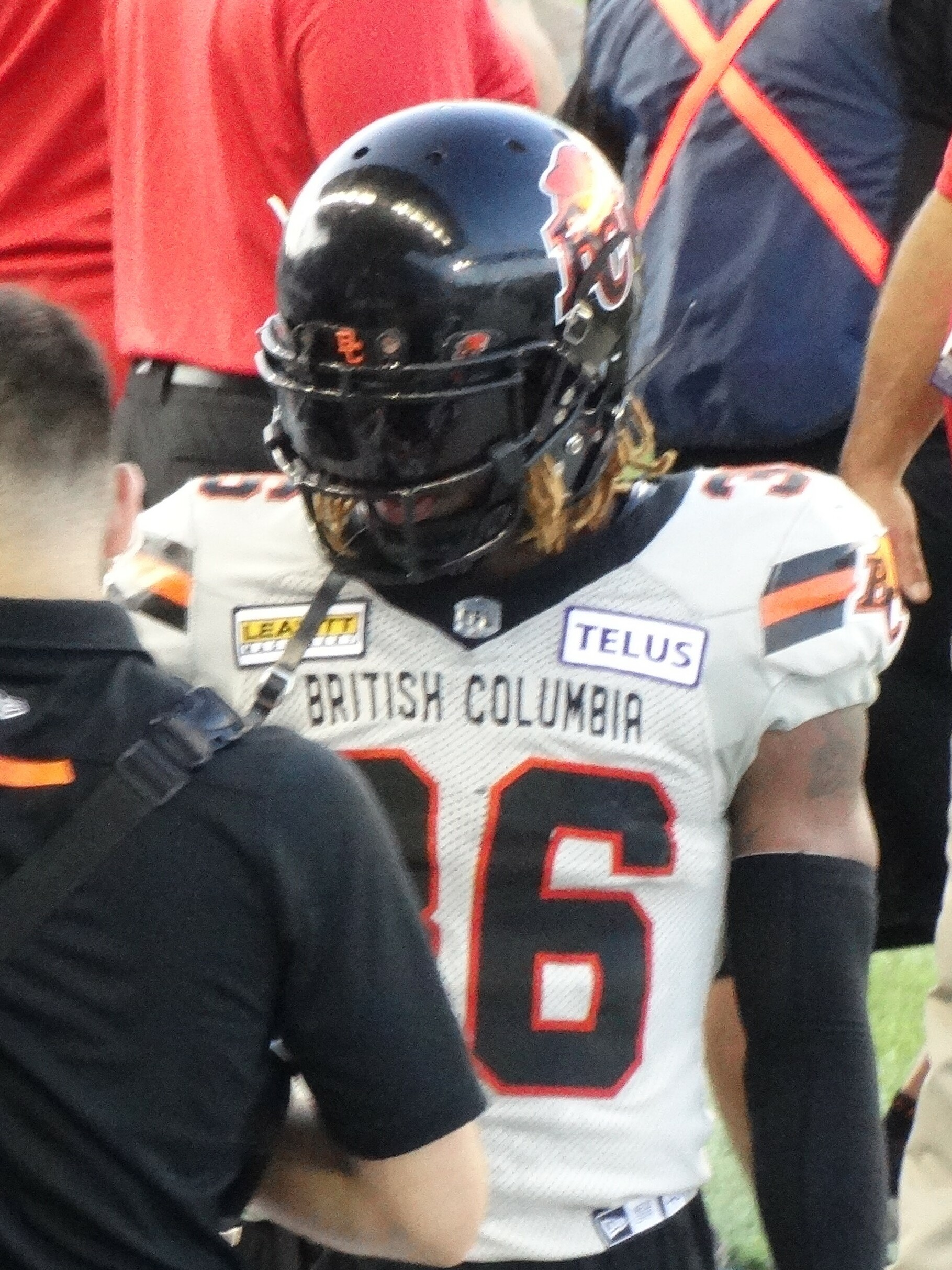
Mauger with the BC Lions in 2023

=== Oakland Raiders ===
On August 9, 2018, Mauger signed with the Oakland Raiders. He was waived on September 1, 2018.

=== Atlanta Legends ===
In 2018, Mauger signed with the Atlanta Legends of the Alliance of American Football for the 2019 season. He was placed on injured reserve on February 14, 2019. The league ceased operations in April 2019.

=== BC Lions ===
On January 18, 2022, Mauger signed with the BC Lions of the Canadian Football League (CFL). In 2022, he played and started in eight regular season games where he had 19 defensive tackles, two special teams tackles, one sack, one interception, and one forced fumble.

In the 2023 season, Mauger played in all 18 regular season games, starting in 17, where he had 46 defensive tackles, eight special teams tackles, six pass knockdowns, one sack, and one interception. He also played in both of the team's post-season games where he had three defensive tackles. On February 9, 2024, Mauger was released by the Lions.

=== Toronto Argonauts ===
On February 13, 2024, it was announced that Mauger had signed with the Toronto Argonauts. He began the season as the starter at cover linebacker, but only played the first three games due injury. He returned as a backup, but eventually reclaimed his starting role in the 12th game of the season. Mauger played in eight games, starting in six, before becoming injured again and sitting out the rest of the season. He had 29 defensive tackles, four special teams tackles, one sack, and two pass knockdowns in 2024. He was on the injured list when the Argonauts defeated the Winnipeg Blue Bombers in the 111th Grey Cup. He was released part way through the preseason on May 28, 2025.
