= Frankie Griffin =

American gridiron football player (born 1995)

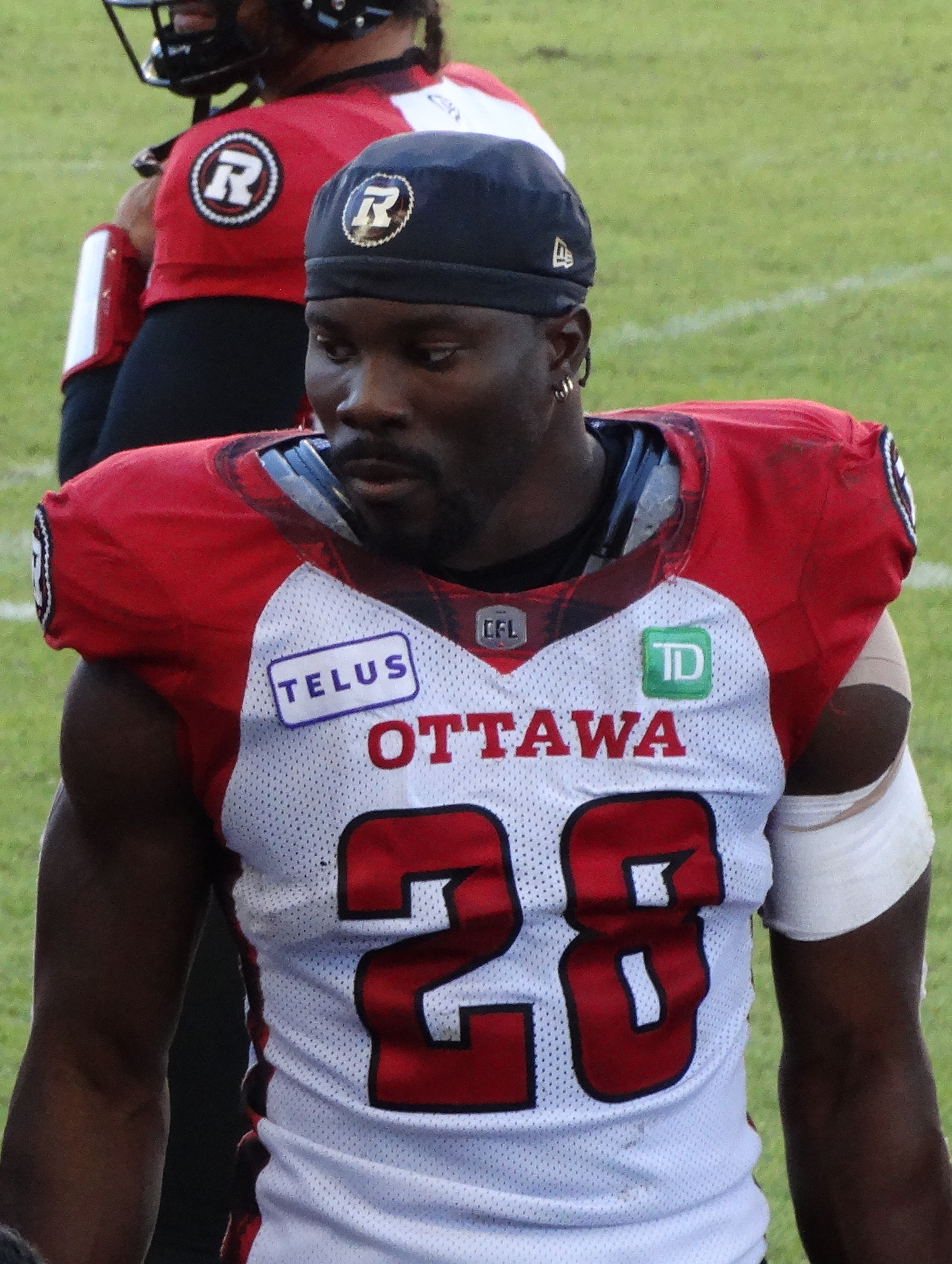
- Griffin with the Ottawa Redblacks in 2024

Profile
- Position: Linebacker

Personal information
- Born: October 23, 1995 (age 31); Houston, Texas, U.S.
- Listed height: 6 ft 0 in (1.83 m)
- Listed weight: 203 lb (92 kg)

Career information
- High school: Klein Collins (Klein, Texas)
- College: Texas State
- NFL draft: 2020: undrafted

Career history
- 2020: Green Bay Packers*
- 2021–2025: Ottawa Redblacks
- * Offseason or practice squad member only

Awards and highlights
- Third-team All-Sun Belt (2017)
- Stats at CFL.ca

Frankie Griffin (born October 23, 1995) is an American professional football linebacker. He most recently played for the Ottawa Redblacks of the Canadian Football League (CFL). He played college football at Texas State. He has also been a member of the Green Bay Packers.

== Early life ==
Griffin played high school football at Klein Collins High School in Klein, Texas.

== College career ==
Griffin played college football at Texas State from 2016 to 2019 as a linebacker. He redshirted in 2014 and missed the 2015 season due to injury.

Griffin played in nine games, starting eight, in 2016, recording 46 tackles. He started 12 games in 2017, totaling 74 tackles, four sacks, two forced fumbles, and two fumble recoveries, earning third team All-Sun Belt Conference honors. He appeared in 12 games, starting 10, in 2018, recording 71 tackes and two sacks, garnering honorable mention All-Sun Belt recognition. Griffin played in 11 games, starting nine, in 2019, accumulating 67 tackles, 1.5 sacks, two forces fumbles, one fumble recovery and one blocked kick.

== Professional career ==
=== Green Bay Packers ===
Griffin was signed by the Green Bay Packers of the National Football League (NFL) on April 30, 2020, after going undrafted in the 2020 NFL draft. He was released on August 12, 2020.

=== Ottawa Redblacks ===
Griffin was signed by the Ottawa Redblacks of the Canadian Football League (CFL) on January 22, 2021. He dressed in eight games, starting two, for the Redblacks in 2021, recording eight tackles on defense, five special teams tackles and one fumble recovery. He appeared in eight games, all starts, in 2022, totaling 34 tackles on defense and one special teams tackle. Griffin started 14 games in 2023, recording 73 tackles on defense, four special teams tackles, and one interception.

He became a free agent upon the expiry of his contract on February 10, 2026.
