= Josh Woods (Canadian football) =

American gridiron football player (born 1998)

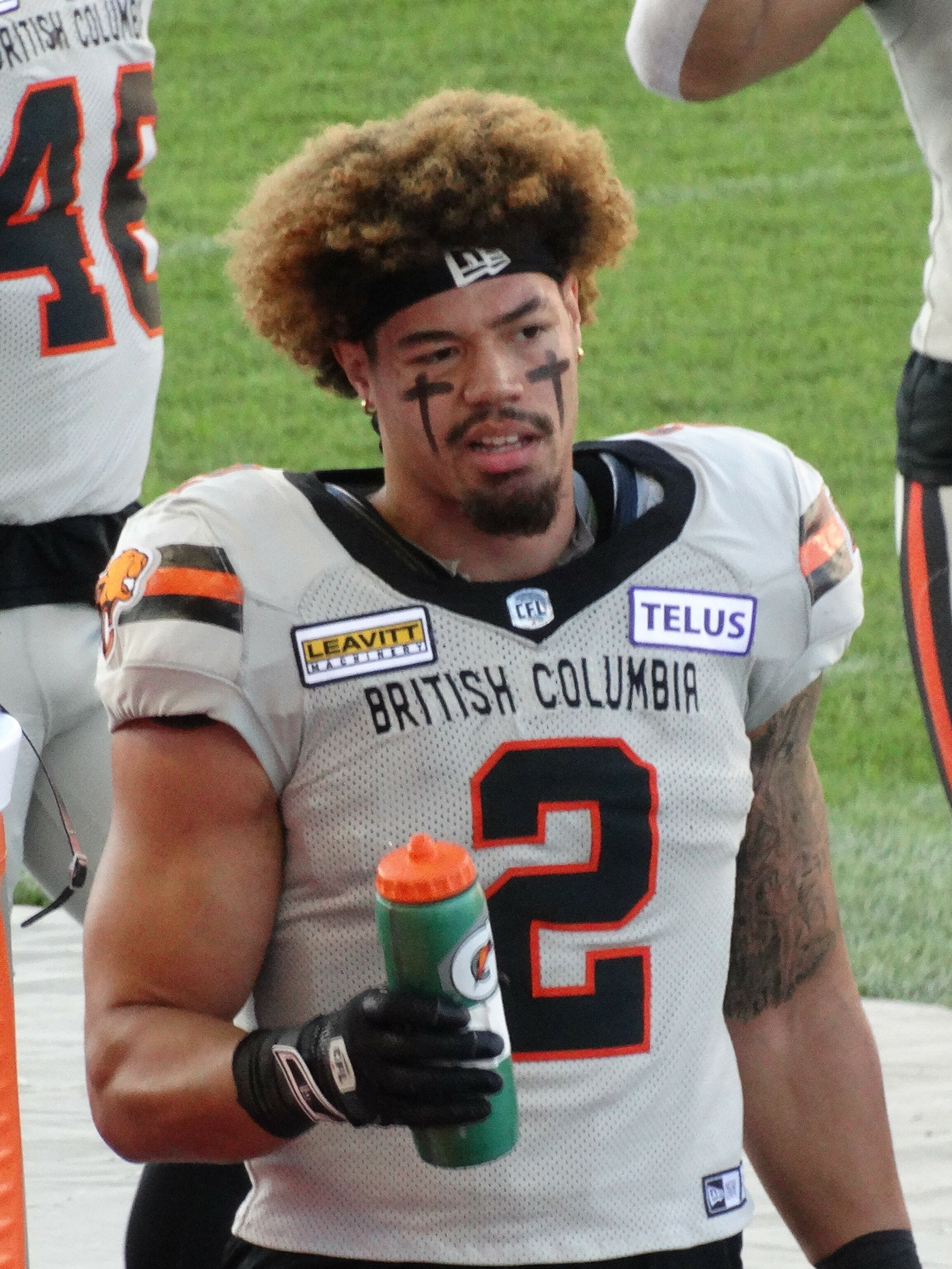
- Woods with the BC Lions in 2023

No. 2 – Saskatchewan Roughriders
- Position: Linebacker
- Roster status: Active
- CFL status: American

Personal information
- Born: January 17, 1998 (age 28); Ontario, California, U.S.
- Listed height: 6 ft 2 in (1.88 m)
- Listed weight: 234 lb (106 kg)

Career information
- High school: Upland High
- College: UCLA
- NFL draft: 2020: undrafted

Career history
- 2021–2025: BC Lions
- 2026–present: Saskatchewan Roughriders
- Stats at CFL.ca

Josh Woods (born January 17, 1998) is an American professional football linebacker for the Saskatchewan Roughriders of the Canadian Football League (CFL).

== College career ==
Woods played college football for the UCLA Bruins from 2015 to 2019. He played in 31 games where he had 69 solo tackles, 42 assisted tackles, 5.5 sacks, two fumble recoveries, two pass knockdowns, and one interception.

== Professional career ==
Pre-draft measurables
| Height | Weight |
|---|---|
| 6 ft 2 1/8 in (1.88 m) | 234 lb (106 kg) |
Values from Pro Day

=== BC Lions ===
Woods signed with the BC Lions on October 8, 2021. He made his professional debut in the penultimate game of the 2021 season on November 12, 2021, against the Calgary Stampeders. He played in two regular season games that year where he had one defensive tackle.

After beginning the 2022 season on the injured list, Woods played in 17 regular season games where he had 23 defensive tackles, 12 special teams tackles, and two sacks. He also played in both post-season games where he had six defensive tackles and two special teams tackles.

On June 27, 2024, Woods suffered a season-ending knee injury during BC's Week 4 matchup versus the Edmonton Elks. In his four games played in 2024, Woods had 21 defensive tackles and one special teams tackle. On May 28, 2025, Woods was placed on the 1-game injured list to start the 2025 CFL season and was later suspended by the Lions, on June 6, 2025. On July 4, 2025, Woods' suspension was lifted and he was reinstated directly to the active roster as his injury had also healed. On December 22, 2025, Woods was released by the Lions.

=== Saskatchewan Roughriders ===
On February 4, 2026, it was announced that Woods had signed with the Saskatchewan Roughriders.

== Personal life ==
Woods was born to parents Dominic and Jennifer Woods.
