= Josh Banks (gridiron football) =

American gridiron football player (born 1994)

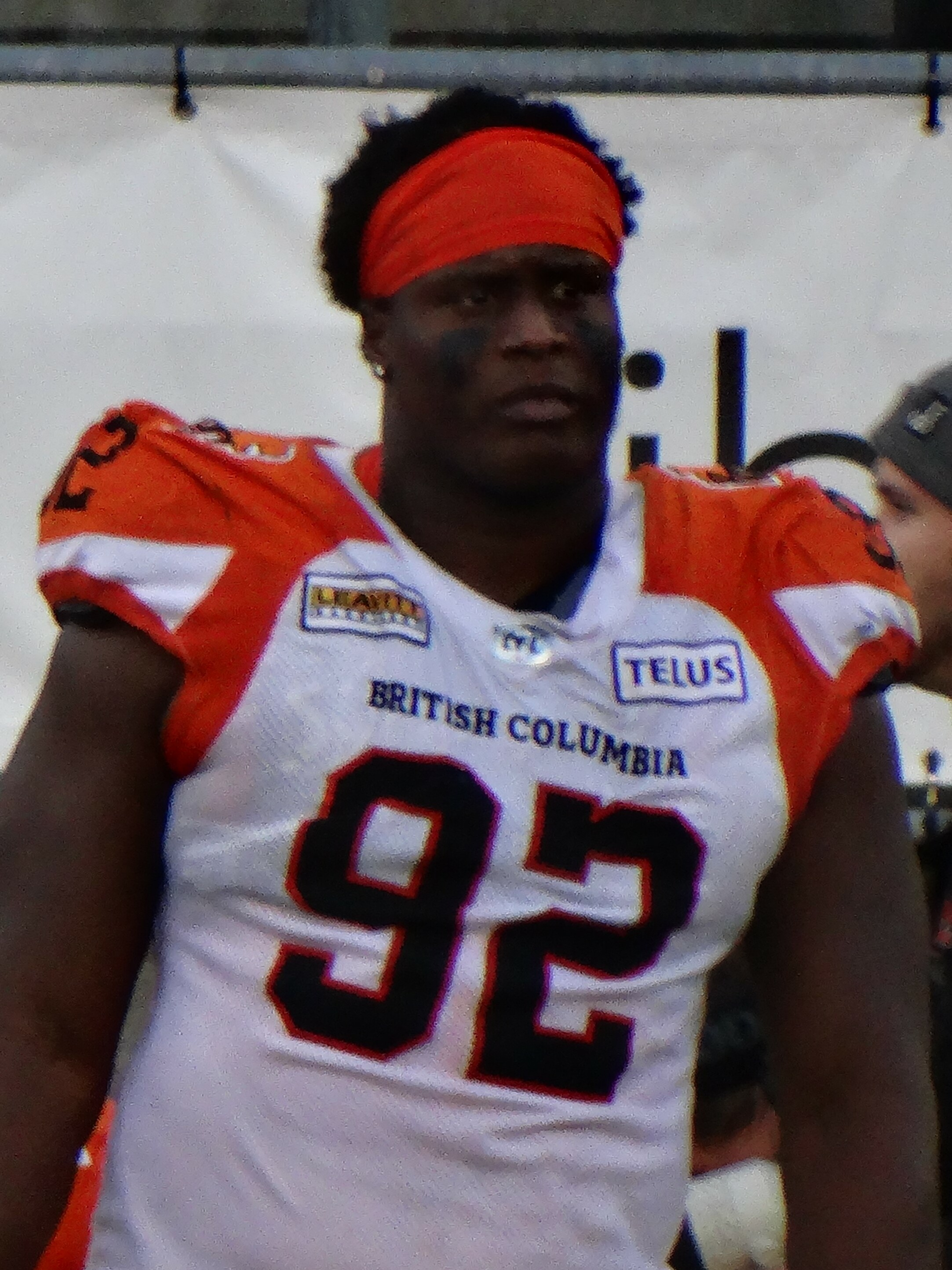
- Banks with the BC Lions in 2022

Profile
- Position: Defensive lineman

Personal information
- Born: June 13, 1994 (age 32); Cary, North Carolina, U.S.
- Listed height: 6 ft 4 in (1.93 m)
- Listed weight: 290 lb (132 kg)

Career information
- High school: Middle Creek High
- College: Wake Forest

Career history
- 2017–2018: New York Giants
- 2019: Orlando Apollos
- 2020: Tampa Bay Vipers
- 2021–2024: BC Lions
- Stats at Pro Football Reference
- Stats at CFL.ca

Josh Banks (born June 13, 1994) is an American former professional football defensive lineman. He played college football for the Wake Forest Demon Deacons.

== College career ==
After using a redshirt season in 2012, Banks played college football for the Wake Forest Demon Deacons from 2013 to 2016. He played in 43 games where he had 107 total tackles, five sacks, one interception, three pass knockdowns, two forced fumbles, and one fumble recovery. He scored a touchdown on September 15, 2014, after returning an interception 72 yards for a score.

== Professional career ==
=== New York Giants ===
After going undrafted in the 2017 NFL draft, Banks signed with the New York Giants in April 2017. He was placed on the reserve/injured list for 2017. He played in all four preseason games in 2018, but was waived at the end of training camp on September 1, 2018. He was re-signed two days later to a practice squad agreement, but was released on September 7, 2018.

=== Orlando Apollos ===
Banks played for the Orlando Apollos in 2019 where he had 10.5 tackles and one sack.

=== Tampa Bay Vipers ===
Banks was drafted to play for the Tampa Bay Vipers in 2020 where he recorded 5.5 tackles.

=== BC Lions ===
On February 17, 2021, it was announced that Banks had signed with the BC Lions. After making the active roster following training camp, he played in all 14 regular season games in 2021 where he had 15 defensive tackles. In 2022, he played in 16 regular season games and again recorded 15 defensive tackles. He also played in both post-season games that year where he had four defensive tackles.

On February 11, 2025, Banks left the Lions as a free agent at the expiry of his contract. On April 2, 2025, Banks announced his retirement from professional football.

== Personal life ==
Banks was born to parents Kenneth Banks and Necosha Lynn.
