= Brent Monson =

Canadian gridiron football coach (born 1985)

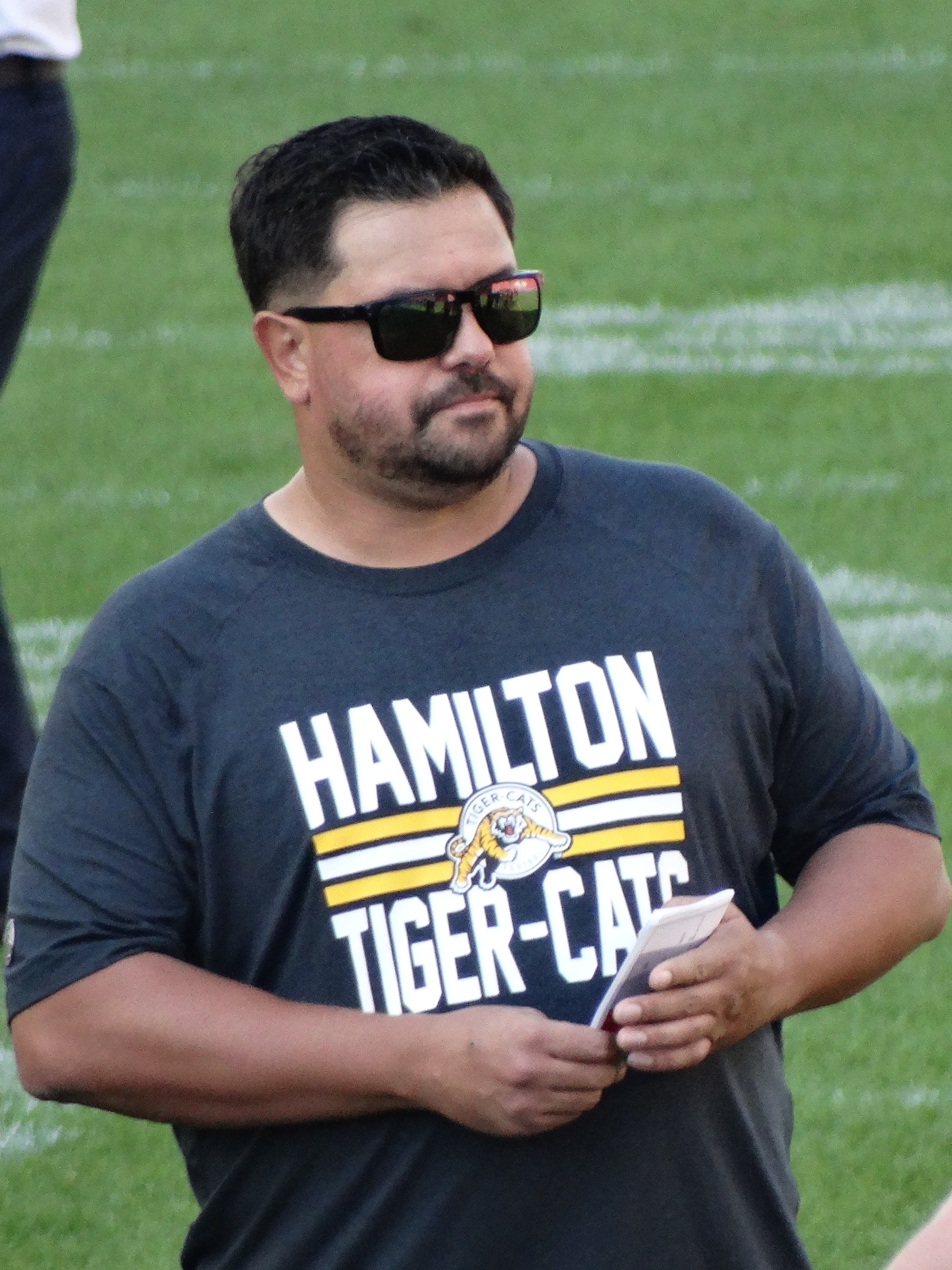
- Monson with the Hamilton Tiger-Cats in 2025

Hamilton Tiger-Cats
- Title: Defensive coordinator

Personal information
- Born: July 18, 1985 (age 41); Hamilton, Ontario, Canada

Career information
- CJFL: Burlington Braves

Career history
- 2010–2014: Calgary Stampeders (Strength and conditioning coach)
- 2010, 2015–2018, 2021: Calgary Stampeders (Linebackers coach)
- 2011: Calgary Stampeders (Defensive line coach)
- 2012–2014: Calgary Stampeders (Running backs coach)
- 2019–2024: Calgary Stampeders (Defensive coordinator)
- 2025–present: Hamilton Tiger-Cats (Defensive coordinator)

Awards and highlights
- 2× Grey Cup champion (2014, 2018)

Brent Monson (born July 18, 1985) is a Canadian professional football coach who is the defensive coordinator for the Hamilton Tiger-Cats of the Canadian Football League (CFL). He is a two-time Grey Cup champion as a coach, having won with the Calgary Stampeders in 2014 and 2018.

== Early life ==
Monson grew up on the West Mountain in Hamilton, Ontario, Canada. He played competitive hockey, and didn't begin playing organized football until playing linebacker for the St. Thomas More Knights in high school.

For two years, he played for the Burlington Braves of the Canadian Junior Football League (CJFL). One of his teammates there was future Stampeders punter Rob Maver.

== Coaching career ==
=== Amateur career ===
At the start of his coaching career, Monson assisted with amateur teams, serving as the strength and conditioning coach, special teams coordinator and defensive backs coach for the Steel City Ironmen of the Ontario Varsity Football League for two seasons. He also served four seasons for Bishop Tonnos Catholic Secondary School in Hamilton as defensive backs, special teams and strength and conditioning coach.

=== Calgary Stampeders ===
In 2009, Monson moved to the professional ranks when he became an assistant in the video department for the Calgary Stampeders. He also worked with Calgary's coaches as an understudy. Calgary lost the West Final to Saskatchewan 27-17.

==== Position Coach ====
In 2010, Monson gained his first professional coaching opportunity when became Calgary's strength and conditioning coach, as well as the team's defensive quality control coach assisting with the linebackers under defensive coordinator Chris Jones. Linebacker Juwan Simpson shared the team lead with seven sacks, earned CFL all-star recognition, and was a finalist for the league’s Most Outstanding Defensive Player Award. Calgary finished with the top record in the CFL (13-5), but once again lost to Saskatchewan in the West Final 20-16.

In 2011, Monson transitioned to coaching Calgary's defensive line coach under Jones while continuing as strength and conditioning coach. Calgary finished 11-7, third in a three way tie for first place in the West. Calgary lost to Edmonton in the West Semi-Final 33-19.

In 2012, he remained as strength and conditioning coach, but moved to the offensive side of the ball when he became running backs coach under offensive coordinator Dave Dickenson. Running back Jon Cornish ran for 1,457 yards, won the CFL rushing title, and set the single-season rushing record for Canadians. Cornish was named the CFL's Most Outstanding Canadian, was the West Division finalist for the Most Outstanding Player, and was selected to the West Division, CFL and CFLPA all-star teams. Cornish rushed for over 100 yards in Calgary's two playoff victories: the West Semi-Final against Saskatchewan and the West Final against BC. Calgary qualified for the 2012 Grey Cup, but lost to the Toronto 35-22.

In 2013, Monson continued as strength and conditioning coach and running backs coach under Dickenson. That year, Cornish improved upon his 2012 performance. He rushed for 1,813 yards, won the CFL rushing title again, and once again set the single-season rushing record for Canadians. His yardage total ranked fourth all-time for a single season. Cornish once again won the CFL's Most Outstanding Canadian Award, won the CFL Most Outstanding Player Award, and won the Lou Marsh Trophy as Canada's top athlete for 2013. Calgary finished with a league-best 14-4 record, but lost the West Final to Saskatchewan 35-13.

In 2014, Monson was strength and conditioning coach for his fifth season, and running backs coach under Dickenson for his third season. Cornish was limited to nine regular season games due to various injuries. Nonetheless, he led the league in rushing yards with 1,082. Cornish was named a West-division All-Star, and won the CFL's Most Outstanding Canadian Award. Calgary finished the regular season with a league-best 15-3 record, and defeated Edmonton in the West Final 43-18. Monson earned his first Grey Cup when Calgary won 20-16 over the team from Monson's hometown, the Hamilton Tiger-Cats.

In 2015, Monson moved back to coaching on the defensive side of the ball, this time under defensive coordinator Rich Stubler. He became Calgary's linebackers coach for the second time. Calgary finished tied for the top record in the CFL with Edmonton (14-4), but Edmonton clinched first place in the West by winning their 3-game season series 2-1. Calgary defeated BC 35-9 in the West Semi-Final, but Calgary fell to Edmonton in the West Final 45-31.

In 2016, he continued as linebackers coach, this time under new defensive coordinator DeVone Claybrooks. Outside linebacker Deron Mayo led the Stamps with 77 tackles, and rookie Alex Singleton emerged as the starter at middle linebacker. Calgary finished first overall in the CFL with a 15-2-1 record, which included the CFL record for the longest winning streak within one season (14). Calgary beat BC 42-15 in the West Final. In the Grey Cup, Calgary lost in overtime to Ottawa 39-33.

In 2017, Monson maintained his position as linebackers coach under Claybrooks. Calgary finished 13-4-1, once again first overall in the CFL. Calgary defeated Edmonton in the West Final 32-28. Calgary fell to Toronto in the Grey Cup 27-24.

In 2018, Monson was once again the linebackers coach under Claybrooks. Calgary finished first overall in the CFL with a 13-5 record, which was helped by Singleton, a CFL all-star in the middle who was voted the CFL’s Most Outstanding Defensive Player following a season in which he established a league record for most tackles in a season by a Canadian. Singleton also set team records for most defensive tackles and most total tackles in a season. Monson stepped in as the acting defensive coordinator for Calgary's August 25th game against Winnipeg when Claybrooks was hospitalized due to illness. Calgary beat Winnipeg in the West Final 22-14, and Ottawa in the Grey Cup 27-16.

==== Defensive Coordinator ====
Following the 2018 Grey Cup win, Claybrooks was hired by the BC to be their head coach for the 2019 season, leading to a vacancy at defensive coordinator for Calgary. On December 14, 2018, Monson was promoted to Calgary's defensive coordinator for the 2019 season.

In 2019, Monson's first season as defensive coordinator under head coach Dickenson, Calgary finished second in the West with a 12-6 record. The team lost to Winnipeg in the West Semi-Final 35-14.

The 2020 season was cancelled due to the COVID-19 pandemic, and Monson maintained his defensive coordinator position under Dickenson.

In 2021, Monson continued as defensive coordinator under Dickenson, while once again holding the linebackers coach position. The Stampeders gave up the second-fewest offensive touchdowns in the CFL and allowed an average of fewer than 19 points per game. First-year linebacker Darnell Sankey led the league with 87 defensive tackles and was named a West Division all-star, and Mike Rose earned CFL all-star honours for the first time in his career. Calgary finished third in the West with an 8-6 record, and fell to Saskatchewan in overtime 33-30 in the West Semi-Final.

In 2022, Monson was once again defensive coordinator under Dickenson. The Stampeders led the CFL in sacks and allowed the league’s second-lowest point total. The team was number 1 in fewest yards allowed per play, opponent second-down conversion rate, and big plays allowed. The Stamps allowed the second-fewest rushing yards and allowed opponents the second-lowest pass-completion percentage. Defensive linemen Rose and Shawn Lemon, linebacker Cameron Judge and defensive back Jonathan Moxey were named West Division all-stars and Rose, Lemon and Judge earned CFL all-star recognition. Calgary finished tied for second place in the West Division with BC, but BC finished second due to winning their 3 game season series 2-1. BC beat Calgary in the West Semi-Final 30-16.

In 2023, Monson returned as Calgary's defensive coordinator under Dickenson. Calgary struggled with a 6-12 record. However, the defense was led by West Division and CFL all-star linebacker Micah Awe, Rose, who earned division and league all-star recognition after leading all defensive tackles with 11 sacks, and Judge, who was tied for second in the league and was first among linebackers with five interceptions. The defense gave up less than 20 points in week 19 against Saskatchewan and week 20 against BC, both Stampeder victories which helped Calgary finished third in the West and qualify for the playoffs for the 18th consecutive season. Calgary lost to BC in the West Semi-Final 41-30.

In 2024, Monson was the defensive coordinator under Dickenson for the sixth consecutive year. The Stampeders finished with a CFL-worst 5-12-1 record, and missed the playoffs for the first time since the 2004 season. After the season, the Stampeders announced that Monson would not be retained on the team's coaching staff for the 2025 season.

=== Hamilton Tiger-Cats ===
On December 17, 2024, it was announced that Monson had been hired as the defensive coordinator for the Hamilton Tiger-Cats.
