= 2023 Calgary Stampeders season =

CFL team season

- Owner: Calgary Sports and Entertainment
- General manager: Dave Dickenson
- President: John Hufnagel
- Head coach: Dave Dickenson
- Home stadium: McMahon Stadium

Results
- Record: 6–12
- Division place: 3rd, West
- Playoffs: Lost West Semi-Final
- Team MOP: Reggie Begelton
- Team MODP: Micah Awe
- Team MOC: Cameron Judge
- Team MOOL: Sean McEwen
- Team MOST: Rene Paredes
- Team MOR: Clark Barnes

Uniform
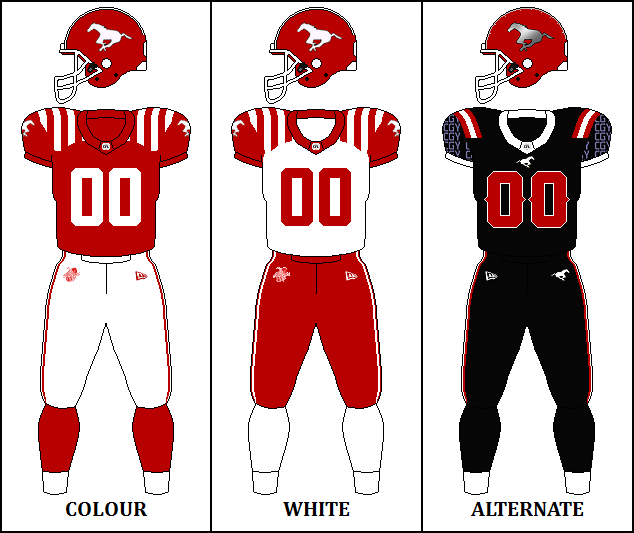

The 2023 Calgary Stampeders season was the 65th season for the team in the Canadian Football League (CFL) and their 78th overall. It was Dave Dickenson's seventh season as head coach and first as general manager following his promotion.

The Stampeders managed to qualify for the playoffs for an 18th straight season after the team defeated the BC Lions in week 20 and the Saskatchewan Roughriders lost in the same week. This was the first time Calgary had a losing regular season record since the 2007 season.

The team attempted to win the ninth Grey Cup championship in franchise history, but lost the West Semi-Final to the BC Lions.

== Offseason ==
=== CFL global draft ===
The 2023 CFL global draft took place on May 2, 2023. The Stampeders had the sixth selection in each round.

Round	Pick	Player	Position	Club/School	Nationality
1	6	Isaac Moore	OL	Temple	Sweden
2	15	Lino Schröter	LB	Cologne Crocodiles	Germany

== CFL national draft ==
The 2023 CFL draft took place on May 2, 2023. The Stampeders had eight selections in the eight-round draft after forfeiting their second round pick after selecting T. J. Rayam in the 2022 Supplemental Draft and trading their seventh-round pick to the Roughriders in exchange for James Smith. However, the team swapped their first-round pick and acquired additional third-round picks and sixth-round picks after trading Bo Levi Mitchell to the Hamilton Tiger-Cats.

The Stampeders had the sixth selection in each of the eight rounds of the draft after losing the West Semi-Final and finishing third in the 2022 league standings, not including traded picks.

Round	Pick	Player	Position	University team	Hometown
1	4	Cole Tucker	WR	Northern Illinois	DeKalb, IL
3	22	Kwadwo Boahen	DL	Alberta	Calgary, AB
3	24	Clark Barnes	WR	Guelph	Brampton, ON
4	33	Alexandre Marcoux	OL	McGill	Lévis, QC
5	42	Ryan Leder	DL	McMaster	Hamilton, ON
6	49	Sebastian Howard	TE	St. Mary's	Vancouver, BC
6	51	Campbell Fair	K	Ottawa	Carrying Place, ON
8	69	Lucas Robertson	FB	British Columbia	Edmonton, AB

== Preseason ==
=== Schedule ===
Week	Game	Date	Kickoff	Opponent	Results		TV	Venue	Attendance	Summary
Week	Game	Date	Kickoff	Opponent	Score	Record	TV	Venue	Attendance	Summary
A	1	Mon, May 22	2:00 p.m. MDT	vs. Edmonton Elks	W 29–24	1–0	None	McMahon Stadium	17,942	Recap
B	Bye									
C	2	Thu, June 1	8:30 p.m. MDT	at BC Lions	L 22–25	1–1	None	BC Place		Recap

# Games played with red uniforms.

== Regular season ==
=== Standings ===
West Division
Team	GP	W	L	T	Pts	PF	PA	Div	Stk	
Winnipeg Blue Bombers	18	14	4	0	28	594	377	10–2	W4	Details
BC Lions	18	12	6	0	24	495	439	8–4	L1	Details
Calgary Stampeders	18	6	12	0	12	412	471	4–7	L1	Details
Saskatchewan Roughriders	18	6	12	0	12	387	551	5–7	L7	Details
Edmonton Elks	18	4	14	0	8	367	517	2–9	L4	Details

=== Schedule ===
Week	Game	Date	Kickoff	Opponent	Results		TV	Venue	Attendance	Summary
Week	Game	Date	Kickoff	Opponent	Score	Record	TV	Venue	Attendance	Summary
1	1	Thu, June 8	7:00 p.m. MDT	vs. BC Lions	L 15–25	0–1	TSN/CBSSN	McMahon Stadium	17,942	Recap
2	2	Thu, June 15	5:30 p.m. MDT	at Ottawa Redblacks	W 26–15	1–1	TSN	TD Place Stadium	18,251	Recap
3	3	Sat, June 24	5:00 p.m. MDT	vs. Saskatchewan Roughriders	L 26–29 (2OT)	1–2	TSN	McMahon Stadium	24,923	Recap
4	Bye									
5	4	Fri, July 7	6:30 p.m. MDT	at Winnipeg Blue Bombers	L 11–24	1–3	TSN	IG Field	30,561	Recap
6	5	Sat, July 15	5:00 p.m. MDT	at Saskatchewan Roughriders	W 33–31	2–3	TSN/CBSSN	Mosaic Stadium	28,842	Recap
7	6	Sun, July 23	5:00 p.m. MDT	vs. Ottawa Redblacks	L 41–43 (OT)	2–4	TSN/CBSSN	McMahon Stadium	21,226	Recap
8	7	Sun, July 30	5:00 p.m. MDT	at Montreal Alouettes	L 18–25	2–5	TSN/RDS	Molson Stadium	18,098	Recap
9	8	Fri, Aug 4	7:00 p.m. MDT	vs. Toronto Argonauts	W 20–7	3–5	TSN	McMahon Stadium	19,234	Recap
10	9	Sat, Aug 12	5:00 p.m. MDT	at BC Lions	L 9–37	3–6	TSN/CBSSN	BC Place	20,524	Recap
11	10	Fri, Aug 18	7:00 p.m. MDT	vs. Winnipeg Blue Bombers	L 18–19	3–7	TSN	McMahon Stadium	20,106	Recap
12	11	Fri, Aug 25	5:30 p.m. MDT	at Toronto Argonauts	L 31–39	3–8	TSN	BMO Field	17,906	Recap
13	12	Mon, Sept 4	5:00 p.m. MDT	vs. Edmonton Elks	W 35–31	4–8	TSN/CBSSN	McMahon Stadium	26,741	Recap
14	13	Sat, Sept 9	5:00 p.m. MDT	at Edmonton Elks	L 23–25	4–9	TSN	Commonwealth Stadium	32,422	Recap
15	Bye									
16	14	Sat, Sept 23	2:00 p.m. MDT	vs. Montreal Alouettes	L 11–28	4–10	TSN/RDS	McMahon Stadium	22,321	Recap
17	15	Sat, Sept 30	5:00 p.m. MDT	at Hamilton Tiger-Cats	L 15–22	4–11	TSN	Tim Hortons Field	22,809	Recap
18	Bye									
19	16	Fri, Oct 13	7:30 p.m. MDT	vs. Saskatchewan Roughriders	W 26–19	5–11	TSN	McMahon Stadium	24,099	Recap
20	17	Sat, Oct 20	8:00 p.m. MDT	at BC Lions	W 41–16	6–11	TSN	BC Place	22,537	Recap
21	18	Fri, Oct 27	7:00 p.m. MDT	vs. Winnipeg Blue Bombers	L 13–36	6–12	TSN	McMahon Stadium	18,691	Recap

# Games played with red uniforms.
# Games played with white uniforms.
# Games played with black uniforms.

== Post-season ==
=== Schedule ===
Game	Date	Kickoff	Opponent	Results		TV	Venue	Attendance	Summary
Game	Date	Kickoff	Opponent	Score	Record	TV	Venue	Attendance	Summary
West Semi-Final	Sat, Nov 4	4:30 p.m. MDT	at BC Lions	L 30–41	0–1	TSN/RDS	BC Place	30,149	Recap

# Games played with white uniforms.

== Roster ==
2023 Calgary Stampeders final roster
**Quarterbacks**: 1 Logan Bonner; 12 Jake Maier; 15 Tommy Stevens; **Running backs**: 35 Ka'Deem Carey; 23 William Langlais; 20 Peyton Logan; 46 Charlie Power; **Receivers**: 84 Reggie Begelton; 81 Luther Hakunavanhu; 89 Colton Hunchak; 80 Marken Michel; 83 Tyson Middlemost; 86 Tre Odoms-Dukes; 88 Cole Tucker	**Offensive linemen**: 66 Bryce Bell T/G; 54 D. J. Coker T; 60 D'Antne Demery T; 51 Sean McEwen C; 58 Ryan Sceviour G; 67 Zack Williams G; **Defensive linemen**: 91 Isaac Adeyemi-Berglund DE; 95 Julian Howsare DE; 40 Mike Moore DE/DT; 41 Mike Rose DT/DE; 77 Kelon Thomas DE; 97 Derek Wiggan DT; **Special teams**: 52 Aaron Crawford LS; 24 Cody Grace P; 30 René Paredes K	**Linebackers**: 57 Micah Awe; 48 Jordan Herdman-Reed; 4 Cameron Judge; 43 Charlie Moore; 44 Silas Stewart; 53 Adarius Taylor; 45 Darius Williams; **Defensive backs**: 42 Bailey Devine-Scott; 3 Branden Dozier; 49 Michael Griffin; 2 Jonathan Moxey; 31 Tre Roberson; 8 Nick Statz; 28 Nick Taylor; 38 Malcolm Thompson; 0 Kobe Williams	**Practice roster**: 87 Floyd Allen WR; 34 LeVante Bellamy RB; 63 Rodeem Brown C; 50 Clifford Chattman DB; 92 Ryan Leder DE; 76 Damontre Moore DE; 59 Isaac Moore T; 17 Chris Reynolds QB; 72 Tyler Richardson DB; 19 Toshiki Sato K; 56 Brandon Weldon T; 36 Perry Young LB; **Suspended list**: 7 Tommylee Lewis WR	**Injured list**: 25 Daniel Amoako DB; 14 Clark Barnes WR; 65 Jamal Campbell T; 27 Julian Charles DB; 39 Brad Cowan LB; 33 Tae Daley DB; 37 Elliot Graham DE; 11 Malik Henry WR; 16 Natrell Jamerson DB; 82 Rysen John SB; 98 Terrell McClain DT; 26 Dedrick Mills RB; 47 Brad Muhammad DB; 94 Toby Ndukwe DE; 85 Jalen Philpot WR; 99 T. J. Rayam DT; 21 Shaq Richardson DB; 29 Shaquille St-Lot DB; 93 Alex Tchangam DE; 61 Hugh Thornton T; 9 James Vaughters DE; 32 Titus Wall DB
Italics indicate American player • **Bold** indicates Global player

== Coaching staff ==
Calgary Stampeders staff
Front office: President – John Hufnagel; General Manager – Dave Dickenson; Director of Player Personnel – Brendan Mahoney; Director of U.S. Scouting – Cole Hufnagel; Football Administration Director – Molly Campbell; Director of Football Operations – Nick Bojda; CFL Draft Coordinator – Dwayne Cameron; Head Coaches: Head Coach – Dave Dickenson; Assistant Head Coach – Mark Kilam; Offensive coaches: Offensive Coordinator and Offensive Line – Pat DelMonaco; Quarterbacks – Marc Mueller; Receivers – Nik Lewis; Running Backs – J. R. Davies	Defensive coaches: Defensive Coordinator – Brent Monson; Defensive Line – Juwan Simpson; Linebackers – Bob Slowik; Defensive Backs – Dwayne Cameron; Special teams coaches: Special Teams Coordinator – Mark Kilam; Strength and conditioning: Strength and Conditioning – Taylor Altilio; → Coaching staff
