= Bailey Devine-Scott =

Canadian gridiron football player (born 1999)

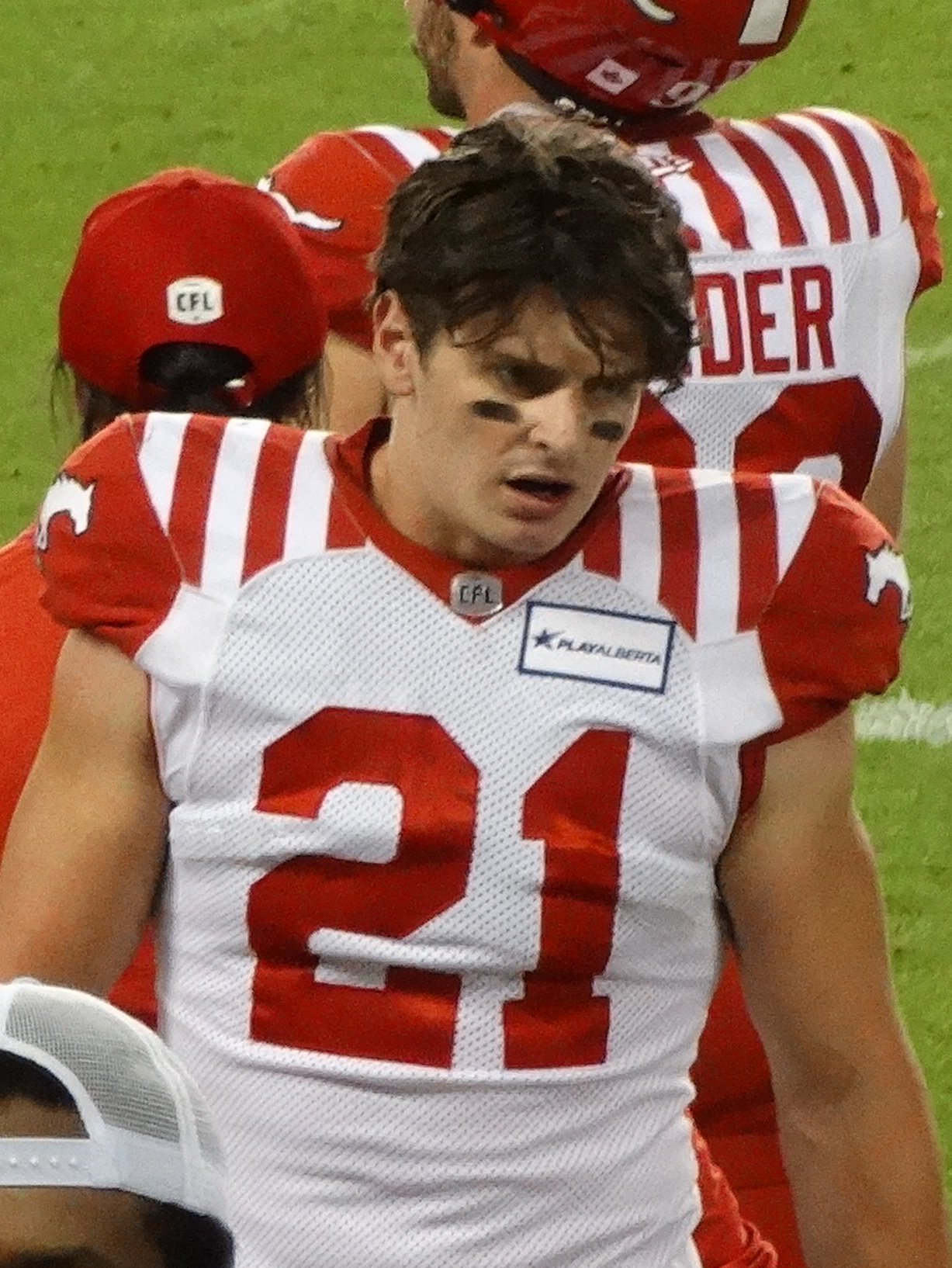
- Devine-Scott with the Calgary Stampeders in 2024

No. 21 – Calgary Stampeders
- Position: Defensive back
- Roster status: Active
- CFL status: National

Personal information
- Born: December 27, 1999 (age 26); Wattle Grove, New South Wales, Australia
- Listed height: 6 ft 0 in (1.83 m)
- Listed weight: 208 lb (94 kg)

Career information
- College: Western New England
- CFL draft: 2022G: 3rd round, 25th overall pick

Career history
- 2022–present: Calgary Stampeders
- Stats at CFL.ca

Bailey Devine-Scott (born December 27, 1999) is an Australian professional football defensive back for the Calgary Stampeders of the Canadian Football League (CFL).

== University career ==
Devine-Scott played college football for the Western New England Golden Bears from 2018 to 2021. He played in 24 games where he had 133 tackles, 16 pass breakups, two interceptions, two forced fumbles, and one fumble recovery.

== Professional career ==
Pre-draft measurables
Height	Weight	Arm length	Hand span	Wingspan
5 ft 11 1/4 in (1.81 m)	188 lb (85 kg)	30 1/2 in (0.77 m)	9 in (0.23 m)	6 ft 2 1/8 in (1.88 m)
All values from Pro Day

Devine-Scott was drafted in the third round, 25th overall, by the Calgary Stampeders in the 2022 CFL global draft and signed with the team on May 6, 2022. Following training camp in 2022, he accepted a spot on the team's practice roster, but was quickly called up as he made his professional debut in week 1, on June 10, 2022, against the Montreal Alouettes where he had two special teams tackles. In total, he played in three regular season games where he recorded two defensive tackles and two special teams tackles, while spending the remainder of the season on the practice roster.

In 2023, Devine-Scott was released in training camp, but was signed to the team's practice roster on June 4, 2023. He played in seven regular season games where he had two defensive tackles and eight special teams tackles. In the 2024 season, he made the team's active roster following training camp and played in 17 regular season games where he had 14 defensive tackles, 16 special teams tackles, and one sack. In the 2025 season he played all 18 games including three starts at safety and had 13 defensive tackles, seven special-teams tackles, one sack and one forced fumble. He had three special-teams stops in a Week 12 victory over Saskatchewan. In Week 20, Devine-Scott had five defensive tackles and a sack. In Week 21 at Edmonton, he caught up to Justin Rankin just before the Elks player crossed the goal-line and punched out the ball to save a touchdown. Devine-Scott was the starting safety for the Western Semi-Final and made three tackles
