= Jalen Philpot =

Canadian gridiron football player (born 2000)

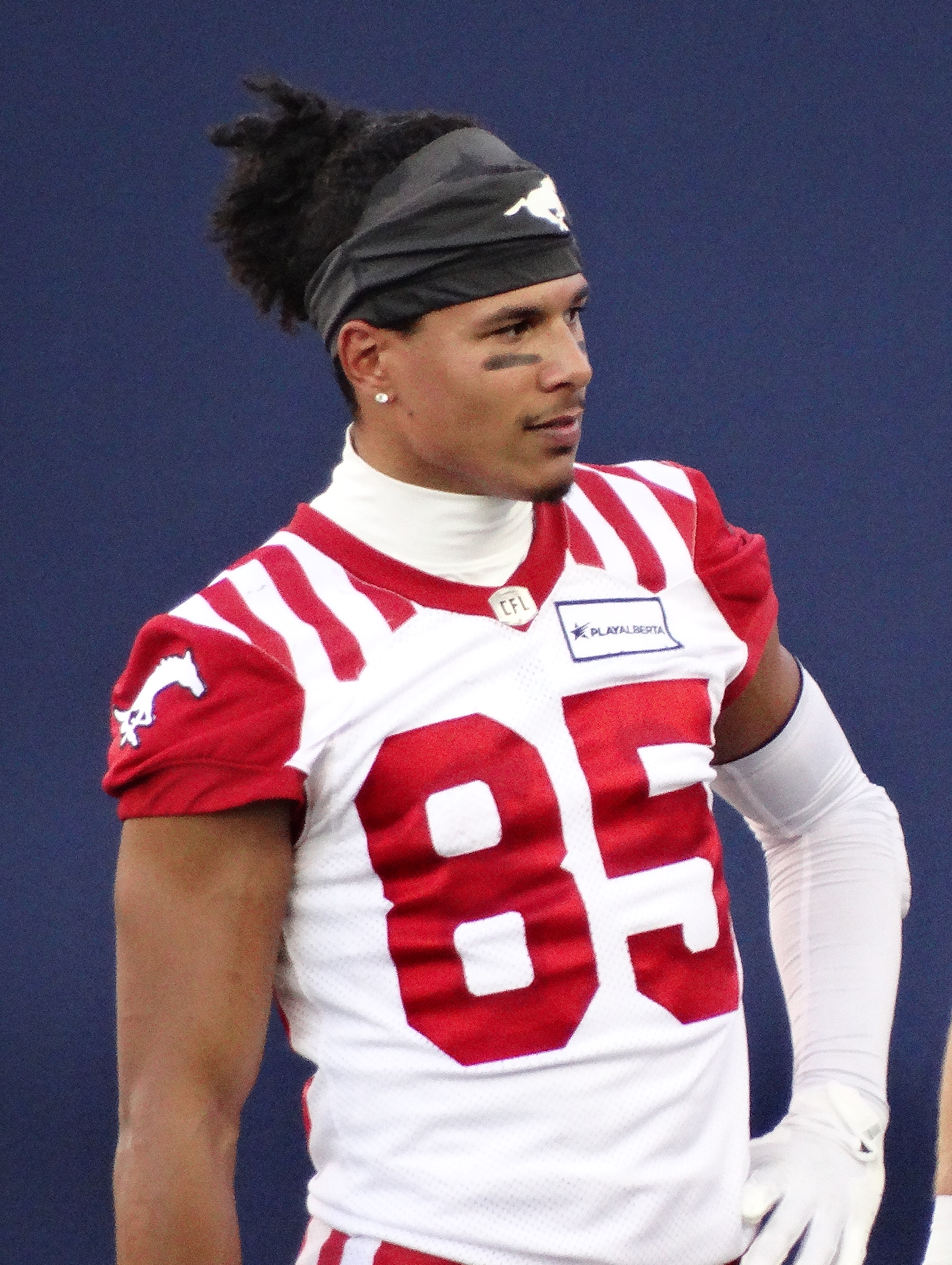
- Philpot with the Calgary Stampeders in 2024

No. 85 – Calgary Stampeders
- Position: Wide receiver
- Roster status: Active
- CFL status: National

Personal information
- Born: July 26, 2000 (age 26); Delta, British Columbia, Canada
- Listed height: 6 ft 0 in (1.83 m)
- Listed weight: 203 lb (92 kg)

Career information
- High school: Seaquam Secondary
- University: Calgary
- CFL draft: 2022: 1st round, 5th overall pick

Career history
- 2022–present: Calgary Stampeders

Awards and highlights
- Vanier Cup champion (2019); 2× First-team All-Canadian (2019, 2021); CFL West All-Star (2026)

Career CFL statistics as of 2026
- Games played: 66
- Receptions: 241
- Receiving yards: 3,047
- Receiving touchdowns: 17
- Rushing yards: 374
- Rushing touchdowns: 0
- Stats at CFL.ca

Jalen Philpot (born July 26, 2000) is a Canadian professional football wide receiver for the Calgary Stampeders of the Canadian Football League (CFL).

== University career ==
After being recruited by multiple U Sports football programs, Philpot committed to play for the Calgary Dinos in January 2018. In his rookie year, in 2018, he played in all eight regular season games where he had 18 catches for 323 yards and three touchdowns.

In 2019, he had a breakout year as he recorded 52 catches (second in U Sports) for 767 yards (fourth) and eight touchdowns (first). For his outstanding sophomore season, he was named a Canada West All-Star and U Sports First Team All-Canadian. He continued to find success though the playoffs that year as the Dinos went all the way to the 55th Vanier Cup game. In the championship game against the Montreal Carabins, Philpot recorded four catches for a team-leading 116 receiving yards and one touchdown as the Dinos emerged victorious and he became a Vanier Cup champion.

Philpot did not play in 2020 due to the cancellation of the 2020 U Sports football season, but returned for his third season in 2021, where he led all of U Sports in receiving yards with 799 yards from 42 receptions and scored three touchdowns in just six games. He was again named a Canada West All-Star and U Sports First Team All-Canadian, but the Dinos failed to qualify for the playoffs and defend their Vanier Cup title. For his U Sports career, he played in 22 regular season games where he had 113 receptions for 1,889 yards and ten touchdowns.

=== University career statistics ===
Regular season

Year	Team	Games	Receiving				
Year	Team	GP	Rec	Yds	Avg	Lng	TD
2018	CGY	10	25	457	18.3	50	4
2019	CGY	12	72	1123	15.6	49	7
2021	CGY	6	43	794	18.5	107	3
Career		28	140	2374	17.5	107	14

== Professional career ==
Pre-draft measurables
Height	Weight	40-yard dash	20-yard shuttle	Three-cone drill	Vertical jump	Broad jump	Bench press
5 ft 11 3/8 in (1.81 m)	193 lb (88 kg)	4.65 s	4.39 s	7.01 s	30.0 in (0.76 m)	9 ft 4 in (2.84 m)	8 reps
All values from CFL Combine

Philpot was ranked as the fifth best player in the Canadian Football League's Amateur Scouting Bureau final rankings for players eligible in the 2022 CFL draft, and second by players in U Sports. He was then drafted in the first round, fifth overall, in the 2022 draft by the Calgary Stampeders and signed with the team on May 9, 2022. Philpot began the 2022 season on the injured list, but made his professional debut in the third game of the season on June 25, 2022, against the Edmonton Elks, where he had one catch for eight yards, one carry for seven yards, and three kickoff returns for 67 yards. He scored his first career touchdown on August 13, 2022, against his hometown BC Lions, when he caught a 19-yard pass from Bo Levi Mitchell. Philpot finished his rookie season having played in 14 regular season games catching 23 passes for 317 yards with three scores. He also carried the ball 10 times for 102 yards, and returned 25 kicks.

On May 3, 2023, it was announced that Jalen Philpot would be out indefinitely after having to undergo surgery to repair a hamstring injury which he suffered while training during the off-season in March.

On December 20, 2024, he signed a two-year contract extension with the Stampeders worth $185,000 in 2025 and $190,000 in 2026, among other incentives.

== Professional career statistics ==
Legend
**Bold**	Career high

=== Regular season ===
Year	Team	Games	Receiving					Rushing			
Year	Team	GP	Rec	Yds	Avg	Lng	TD	Att	Yds	Avg	TD
2022	CGY	14	23	317	13.8	54	3	10	102	10.2	0
2023	CGY	1	0	0	0	0	0	0	0	0	0
2024	CGY	**18**	**66**	659	10	53	3	15	115	**7.7**	0
2025	CGY	16	61	830	13.6	66	3	**17**	**124**	7.3	0
2026	CGY	14	65	**915**	**14.1**	**69**	**7**	9	25	2.8	0
Career		62	215	2,721	12.7	69	16	51	366	7.2	0

== Personal life ==
Philpot was born in Delta, British Columbia to parents Colleen Purcell and Cory Philpot. His father played in six seasons in the Canadian Football League as a running back and enrolled Philpot in football when he was six years old. Philpot has a twin brother, Tyson Philpot, who is younger by seven minutes, who also plays professionally as a receiver for the Montreal Alouettes.
