= Travelle Wharton =

American football player and coach (born 1981)

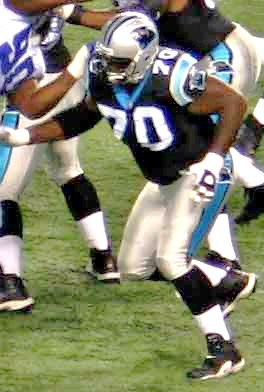
- Wharton with the Carolina Panthers in 2009

Personal information
- Born: May 19, 1981 (age 45); Greenville, South Carolina, U.S.
- Listed height: 6 ft 4 in (1.93 m)
- Listed weight: 315 lb (143 kg)

Career information
- Position: Guard (No. 70)
- High school: Hillcrest (Simpsonville, South Carolina)
- College: South Carolina (2000-2003)
- NFL draft: 2004: 3rd round, 94th overall pick

Career history

Playing
- Carolina Panthers (2004–2011); Cincinnati Bengals (2012); Carolina Panthers (2013)

Coaching
- South Carolina (2015) Offensive quality control coach; Carolina Panthers (2018–2019) Assistant offensive line coach; Washington Football Team / Commanders (2020–2022) Assistant offensive line coach; Washington Commanders (2023) Offensive line coach; Baltimore Ravens (2024–2025) Assistant offensive line coach

Awards and highlights
- Second-team All-SEC (2003)

Career NFL statistics
- Games played: 115
- Games started: 111
- Stats at Pro Football Reference

Glenn Travelle Wharton (born May 19, 1981) is an American football coach and former player who most recently served as the assistant offensive line coach for the Baltimore Ravens of the National Football League (NFL). He played college football for the South Carolina Gamecocks and was selected by the Carolina Panthers in the third round of the 2004 NFL draft. He also played for the Cincinnati Bengals.

== Early life ==
Wharton was a Shrine Bowl participant following his senior year at Hillcrest High School in Simpsonville, South Carolina. He earned all-area and all-state recognition as a senior.

== College career ==
Wharton started 45 of the 47 games he played at left tackle at the University of South Carolina. He did not allow a sack after the second game of his freshman season in 2000, a span of 45 contests. In 2003, as a senior with the Gamecocks, he started all 12 games at left tackle. Wharton earned second-team All-Southeastern Conference recognition and was chosen to play in the Senior Bowl. He was a team captain and was the lone returning starter on the offensive line that allowed only 10 sacks the entire season.

== Professional career ==
Pre-draft measurables
Height	Weight	Arm length	Hand span	40-yard dash	10-yard split	20-yard split	20-yard shuttle	Three-cone drill	Vertical jump	Broad jump
6 ft 3 5/8 in (1.92 m)	312 lb (142 kg)	32 1/4 in (0.82 m)	10 1/8 in (0.26 m)	5.14 s	1.75 s	2.94 s	4.58 s	8.31 s	31.5 in (0.80 m)	8 ft 9 in (2.67 m)
All values from NFL Combine

=== Carolina Panthers (first stint) ===
He started the final 11 games at left guard as a rookie in 2004 after being inactive for the first five contests. He was the lone rookie starter on the offensive line in 2004 that yielded only 33 sacks, the third-lowest total in Carolina history.

He started all 16 games during the 2005 season.

In the first game of the 2006 season during a 20−6 loss to the Atlanta Falcons he suffered a torn ACL and MCL and was placed on injured reserve thus ending his season.

He returned to start all 16 games at left tackle during the 2007 campaign.

Before the 2008 season, on February 14, 2008, Wharton signed a 6-year extension to remain with the Panthers. The deal had a total dollar value of $36 million and included $12 million in guaranteed money. Travelle went on to start all 14 games he appeared in during the 2008 season at left guard, missing two due to injury. He was released on March 13, 2012.

=== Cincinnati Bengals ===
Wharton signed with Cincinnati Bengals on March 17, 2012. He was placed on injured reserve on August 24, 2012, after suffering a knee injury. He was released by the Bengals on July 22, 2013.

=== Carolina Panthers (second stint) ===
On August 25, 2013, Wharton signed a one-year deal with the Carolina Panthers. Wharton announced his retirement on July 29, 2014.

== Coaching career ==
=== University of South Carolina ===
Wharton was an offensive quality control coach for South Carolina during their 2015 season.

=== Carolina Panthers ===
On January 29, 2018, the Carolina Panthers hired Wharton as their assistant offensive line coach. Following the hiring of new head coach Matt Rhule in January 2020, he was not retained by the Panthers.

=== Washington Football Team / Commanders ===
In 2020, Wharton joined the Washington Football Team as their assistant offensive line coach. This move reunited Wharton with newly hired head coach Ron Rivera, who he worked under with the Panthers. In September 2023, he was promoted to the team's offensive line coach.

=== Baltimore Ravens ===
Wharton was hired by the Baltimore Ravens as an assistant offensive line coach in 2024.

== Personal life ==
Wharton is married with three daughters and a son.
