= Hillcrest High School (Simpsonville, South Carolina) =

Location
- 3665 S. Industrial Drive; Simpsonville, South Carolina 29681; United States; 34°04′35″N 118°25′46.6″W

Information
- Type: Public
- Motto: Ready, Authentic, Motivated
- Established: 1957 (69 years ago)
- School district: Greenville County School District
- Principal: April Reese
- Teaching staff: 105.00 (FTE)
- Enrollment: 1,864 (2026-2027)
- Student to teacher ratio: 19.86
- Colors: Red and black
- Mascot: Rambo the Ram
- Team name: Hillcrest Rams
- Newspaper: The Rampage
- Yearbook: Hilltopper
- Website: www.greenville.k12.sc.us/hillcrest/

Hillcrest High School is a public high school in Simpsonville, South Carolina, United States, and is one of the largest high schools in the Greenville County School District.

== Facilities ==
Hillcrest High is located in Simpsonville along Interstate 385. The building features a centrally located media center, a 600-seat auditorium, and the A.C. Duckett Gymnasium with 2 auxiliary gymnasiums.

The campus also features various athletics fields, track, and courts. The campus is also home to a greenhouse and agriculture barn facility used by the school's agriculture program.

== History ==
Hillcrest High School was opened on September 3, 1957 for students from the 'Golden Strip' of Simpsonville, Mauldin, and Fountain Inn. A school known as Simpsonville High School served the city of Simpsonville prior to the opening of Hillcrest High School.

Bryson High School served as the High School for African Americans in the area until the integration of Greenville County School District in 1970. Following integration, Bryson High School became a 9th grade center for Hillcrest High School, and then a middle school known as Bryson Middle School.

A new building was constructed adjacent to the school in 1992. Bryson Middle School relocated to the previous Hillcrest High School building.

== Feeder Schools ==
The primary feeder middle schools of Hillcrest High School are Bryson Middle School and Hillcrest Middle School. The primary feeder elementary schools of Hillcrest High School are Bells Crossing Elementary School, Bryson Elementary School, Greenbrier Elementary School, Plain Elementary School, and Simpsonville Elementary School.

== Non-core subject classes ==
In addition to the four traditional core-subject subjects (English, Math, Social Studies, and Science), Hillcrest High offers various classes in World Language, Fine Arts, Physical Education, and Career and Technical Education.

=== World Languages ===
Hillcrest High School offers two languages in its World Language Department for students to study. Spanish and French.

=== Fine Arts ===
Fine Arts classes at Hillcrest High School include art, ceramics, chorus, strings, and band.

=== Career and Technical Education ===
Career and Technical Education classes and/or pathways offered at Hillcrest High School include business, animation, digital publication, image editing, agriculture, health science, web design, and hospitality.

=== Physical Education ===
In addition to Physical Education 1, which is a required course to be taken in South Carolina. The Physical Education department at Hillcrest High School offers team sports, weightlifting, and further physical education classes.

=== Driver's Education ===
Hillcrest High School offers a Driver's Education class.

== Athletics ==
The sports that Hillcrest High School offers are listed below:

Sports offered at Hillcrest High School
Boys	Girls	Co-Ed
Cross Country	Cross Country	Competitive Cheer
Football	Flag Football	
Swimming	Golf	
Volleyball	Swimming	
Basketball	Tennis	
Wrestling	Volleyball	
Baseball	Basketball	
Lacrosse	Wrestling	
Soccer	Lacrosse	
Tennis	Soccer	
Track and Field	Softball	
	Track and Field	

In 2002, 2003, and 2004, the varsity softball team won three consecutive AAAA state championships and accomplished the longest softball winning streak in the state, with 96 wins.

The following is a list of South Carolina High School League (SCHSL) state championships:

Class AAAA

- Boys cross-country – 1982
- Girls soccer – 1999
- Softball – 2002, 2003, 2004, 2012
- Girls Volleyball – 2006, 2007, 2011, 2012, 2013
- Wrestling – 2011, 2012
- Football – 1985, 2014

Class AAAAA

- Wrestling – 2019, 2020, 2021
- Girls Track – 2019, 2021
- Baseball – 2021

== Student Clubs and Organizations ==
Student Clubs and Organizations at Hillcrest High include an Anime Club, Dungeons and Dragons Club, Reading Club, American Sign Language (ASL) Club, Fellowship of Christian Athletes (FCA), Animal Club, French Honor Society, National Art Honor Society, Future Farmers of America (FFA), Science Club, Beta Club, Speech and Debate Team, Best Buddies, Book Club, Crochet Club, Dance Club, National Honor Society, Tabletop Game Club, Youth in Government (YIG), and Student Council.

== Notable alumni ==
- Brett Harker — college baseball coach
- Jamon Meredith — former NFL offensive tackle
- Stephen Thompson — Ultimate Fighting Championship (UFC) fighter
- Travelle Wharton — former NFL offensive lineman
- Mike Rose — All-Star CFL defensive lineman
- Chris Patton — Former PGA professional golfer and 1989 US Amateur champion
