= Brett Harker =

Biographical details
- Born: July 9, 1984 (age 42); Greenville, South Carolina, U.S.

Playing career
- 2003–2005: College of Charleston
- 2005: Batavia Muckdogs
- 2006: Lakewood BlueClaws
- 2007–2008: Clearwater Threshers
- 2008: Reading Phillies
- 2009: Jupiter Hammerheads
- 2009: New Orleans Zephyrs
- 2010: Schaumburg Flyers
- 2011: Lincoln Saltdogs
- Position: Pitcher

Coaching career (HC unless noted)
- 2011–2013: Greenville (SC) H.S. (asst.)
- 2014: Newberry (asst.)
- 2015–2016: Furman (asst.)
- 2017–2020: Furman
- 2021: Hillcrest H.S. (P)
- 2022–2025: Limestone

Head coaching record
- Overall: 164-217
- Tournaments: NCAA DI: 91-96

Brett Keaton Harker (born July 9, 1984) is an American college baseball coach and former pitcher, who was most recently the head baseball coach of the defunct Limestone Saints. He played college baseball at the College of Charleston for head coach John Pawlowski from 2003 to 2005 before playing professionally from 2005 to 2011. Harker then served as head baseball coach of the Furman Paladins (2017–2020), and as Limestone head coach from 2022 until the school's closure in 2025.

== Amateur career ==
Harker attended Hillcrest High School in Simpsonville, South Carolina. He then committed to the College of Charleston, where he was a member of the Cougars baseball team. In 2004, he played collegiate summer baseball with the Yarmouth–Dennis Red Sox of the Cape Cod Baseball League.

== Professional career ==
Harker was drafted in the 5th round of the 2005 Major League Baseball draft by the Philadelphia Phillies.

== Coaching career ==
On July 9, 2014, Harker was named the pitching coach of the Furman Paladins baseball team.

On July 6, 2016, Harker was introduced as the head coach of Furman. Furman University announced on May 18, 2020 that the Paladins baseball team would be terminated due to budget concerns during the COVID-19 pandemic.

In February 2021, Harker was named the pitching coach at his alma mater Hillcrest high school. The team won the Region 1 AAAAA championship, District 1 AAAAA championship, AAAAA upper-state championship, and AAAAA state-championship. This was the first state championship in school history.

Harker was named the head baseball coach at Limestone University August 3, 2021. The university announced in 2025 that it would be ceasing operations after the 2024-25 academic year.

== Head coaching record ==
Record table
Season	Team	Overall	Conference	Standing	Postseason
Furman Paladins (Southern Conference) (2017–2020)
2017	Furman	33–28	14–10	T-3rd	Southern Tournament
2018	Furman	24–28	9–12	7th	Southern Tournament
2019	Furman	26–31	13–11	5th	Southern Tournament
2020	Furman	8–9	0–0		Season canceled due to COVID-19
Furman:		91–96	36–33		
Limestone Saints (South Atlantic Conference) (2022–present)
2022	Limestone	4–41	1–23	13th	
2023	Limestone	19–28	11–13	T-8th	
Limestone:		23–69	12–36		
Total:		114–165			
National champion Postseason invitational champion Conference regular season champion Conference regular season and conference tournament champion Division regular season champion Division regular season and conference tournament champion Conference tournament champion
