= 2022 Calgary Stampeders season =

CFL team season

- Owner: Calgary Sports and Entertainment
- General manager: John Hufnagel
- President: John Hufnagel
- Head coach: Dave Dickenson
- Home stadium: McMahon Stadium

Results
- Record: 12–6
- Division place: 3rd, West
- Playoffs: Lost West Semi-Final
- Team MOP: Ka’Deem Carey
- Team MODP: Shawn Lemon
- Team MOC: Cameron Judge
- Team MOOL: Derek Dennis
- Team MOST: Rene Paredes
- Team MOR: Peyton Logan

Uniform

The 2022 Calgary Stampeders season was the 64th season for the team in the Canadian Football League (CFL) and their 77th overall. The Stampeders qualified for the playoffs for the 17th straight year following their victory over the BC Lions on September 24, 2022. However, the team was defeated by the BC Lions in the West Semi-Final. The 2022 CFL season was Dave Dickenson's sixth season as head coach and John Hufnagel's 14th season as general manager.

== Offseason ==
=== CFL global draft ===
The 2022 CFL global draft took place on May 3, 2022. With the format being a snake draft, the Stampeders selected seventh in the odd-numbered rounds and third in the even-numbered rounds.

Round	Pick	Player	Position	University/Club Team	Nationality
1	7	Bamidele Olaseni	OL	Utah	(United Kingdom) Great Britain
2	12	Ryan Gomes	LB	Galo	Brazil
3	25	Bailey Devine-Scott	DB	Western New England	Australia

== CFL national draft ==
The 2022 CFL draft took place on May 3, 2022. The Stampeders had the fifth selection in each of the eight rounds of the draft after losing the West Semi-Final and finishing fifth in the 2021 league standings.

Round	Pick	Player	Position	University team	Hometown
1	5	Jalen Philpot	WR	Calgary	Delta, BC
2	14	Josiah Schakel	DB	Alberta	Sherwood Park, AB
3	25	Demetri Royer	DB	Western Illinois	Clearwater, FL
4	34	Jacob Butler	OL	Queen's	Chilliwack, BC
5	43	Joel Braden	OL	Regina	Regina, SK
6	52	Rasheed Tucker	RB	Queen's	Toronto, ON
7	61	Shaquille St-Lot	DB	Maine	Montreal, QC
8	70	Daniel Amoako	DB	York	Ajax, ON

== Preseason ==
=== Schedule ===
Week	Game	Date	Kickoff	Opponent	Results		TV	Venue	Attendance	Summary
Week	Game	Date	Kickoff	Opponent	Score	Record	TV	Venue	Attendance	Summary
A	1	Sat, May 28	2:00 p.m. MDT	vs. BC Lions	W 41–6	1–0	None	McMahon Stadium	18,440	Recap
B	2	Fri, June 3	7:00 p.m. MDT	at Edmonton Elks	W 37–7	2–0	None	Commonwealth Stadium	N/A	Recap

== Regular season ==
=== Standings ===
West Division
Team	GP	W	L	T	Pts	PF	PA	Div	Stk	
Winnipeg Blue Bombers	18	15	3	0	30	538	370	10–1	W1	Details
BC Lions	18	12	6	0	24	525	405	8–4	L1	Details
Calgary Stampeders	18	12	6	0	24	533	373	7–5	W2	Details
Saskatchewan Roughriders	18	6	12	0	12	370	440	3–8	L7	Details
Edmonton Elks	18	4	14	0	8	354	599	1–11	L4	Details

=== Schedule ===
Week	Game	Date	Kickoff	Opponent	Results		TV	Venue	Attendance	Summary
Week	Game	Date	Kickoff	Opponent	Score	Record	TV	Venue	Attendance	Summary
1	1	Thu, June 9	7:00 p.m. MDT	vs. Montreal Alouettes	W 30–27	1–0	TSN/RDS	McMahon Stadium	21,139	Recap
2	2	Sat, June 18	4:30 p.m. MDT	at Hamilton Tiger-Cats	W 33–30 (OT)	2–0	TSN	Tim Hortons Field	22,711	Recap
3	3	Sat, June 25	5:00 p.m. MDT	vs. Edmonton Elks	W 30–23	3–0	TSN	McMahon Stadium	22,739	Recap
4	Bye									
5	4	Thu, July 7	7:00 p.m. MDT	at Edmonton Elks	W 49–6	4–0	TSN/RDS	Commonwealth Stadium	21,023	Recap
6	5	Fri, July 15	6:30 p.m. MDT	at Winnipeg Blue Bombers	L 19–26	4–1	TSN/RDS	IG Field	29,746	Recap
7	Bye									
8	6	Sat, July 30	5:00 p.m. MDT	vs. Winnipeg Blue Bombers	L 28–35	4–2	TSN/RDS/ESPN2	McMahon Stadium	25,147	Recap
9	7	Fri, Aug 5	5:30 p.m. MDT	at Ottawa Redblacks	W 17–3	5–2	TSN/RDS2	TD Place Stadium	20,452	Recap
10	8	Sat, Aug 13	5:00 p.m. MDT	vs. BC Lions	L 40–41	5–3	TSN	McMahon Stadium	22,229	Recap
11	9	Sat, Aug 20	5:00 p.m. MDT	at Toronto Argonauts	W 22–19	6–3	TSN	BMO Field	12,584	Recap
12	10	Thu, Aug 25	6:30 p.m. MDT	at Winnipeg Blue Bombers	L 29–31	6–4	TSN	IG Field	30,062	Recap
13	11	Mon, Sept 5	2:30 p.m. MDT	vs. Edmonton Elks	W 26–18	7–4	TSN	McMahon Stadium	30,479	Recap
14	12	Sat, Sept 10	6:00 p.m. MDT	at Edmonton Elks	W 56–28	8–4	TSN/RDS2	Commonwealth Stadium	26,946	Recap
15	13	Sat, Sept 17	5:00 p.m. MDT	vs. BC Lions	L 29–31 (OT)	8–5	TSN	McMahon Stadium	22,319	Recap
16	14	Sat, Sept 24	8:00 p.m. MDT	at BC Lions	W 25–11	9–5	TSN	BC Place	19,323	Recap
17	15	Sat, Oct 1	5:00 p.m. MDT	vs. Toronto Argonauts	W 29–2	10–5	TSN	McMahon Stadium	21,299	Recap
18	Bye									
19	16	Fri, Oct 14	7:45 p.m. MDT	vs. Hamilton Tiger-Cats	L 32–35	10–6	TSN	McMahon Stadium	20,589	Recap
20	17	Sat, Oct 22	5:00 p.m. MDT	at Saskatchewan Roughriders	W 32–21	11–6	TSN	Mosaic Stadium	27,192	Recap
21	18	Sat, Oct 29	6:00 p.m. MDT	vs. Saskatchewan Roughriders	W 36–10	12–6	TSN	McMahon Stadium	25,179	Recap

== Post-season ==
=== Schedule ===
Game	Date	Kickoff	Opponent	Results		TV	Venue	Attendance	Summary
Game	Date	Kickoff	Opponent	Score	Record	TV	Venue	Attendance	Summary
West Semi-Final	Sun, Nov 6	2:30 p.m. MST	at BC Lions	L 16–30	0–1	TSN/RDS/ESPN2	BC Place	30,114	Recap

== Roster ==
2022 Calgary Stampeders final roster
**Quarterbacks**: 12 Jake Maier; 19 Bo Levi Mitchell; 15 Tommy Stevens; **Running backs**: 35 Ka'Deem Carey; 23 William Langlais; 34 Dedrick Mills; 46 Charlie Power; **Receivers**: 84 Reggie Begelton; 81 Luther Hakunavanhu; 82 Malik Henry; 89 Colton Hunchak; 88 Kamar Jorden; 83 Tyson Middlemost; 85 Jalen Philpot; 87 Richie Sindani	**Offensive linemen**: 66 Bryce Bell C/T; 69 Julian Good-Jones T; 51 Sean McEwen C; 58 Ryan Sceviour G; 61 Hugh Thornton T; 67 Zack Williams G; **Defensive linemen**: 91 Isaac Adeyemi-Berglund DE; 40 Shawn Lemon DE; 98 Terrell McClain DT; 9 Folarin Orimolade DE; 99 T. J. Rayam DT; 41 Mike Rose DT; 97 Derek Wiggan DT	**Linebackers**: 39 Brad Cowan; 4 Cameron Judge; 43 Charlie Moore; 47 Fraser Sopik; 44 Silas Stewart; 56 Jameer Thurman; **Defensive backs**: 1 Elie Bouka; 3 Branden Dozier; 7 Javien Elliott; 16 Natrell Jamerson; 2 Jonathan Moxey; 32 Titus Wall; 45 Trumaine Washington; 0 Kobe Williams	**Special teams**: 52 Aaron Crawford LS; 24 Cody Grace P; 30 René Paredes K; **Practice roster**: 70 Keiran Burnham K/P; 33 Bailey Devine-Scott DB; 68 Keanu Ebanks T; 42 Ryan Gomes LB; 37 Elliot Graham DE; 38 Parnell Motley DB; 62 Brandon Murphy T; 86 Tre Odoms-Dukes WR; 17 Dionté Ruffin DB; 49 Perry Young LB; 59 Jonathan Zamora G/C; **Suspended list**: Franklin Agbasimere DE; Brendan Langley WR	**Injured list**: 25 Daniel Amoako DB; 14 Shawn Bane WR; 95 Stefen Banks DE; 26 Marcelis Branch DB; 54 D. J. Coker T; 63 Derek Dennis T; 20 Peyton Logan RB; 93 Romeo McKnight DE; 28 Brad Muhammad DB; 90 George Obinna DE; 31 Tre Roberson DB; 21 Demetri Royer DB; 27 Josiah Schakel LB; 48 Tom Schnitzler FB/LS; 96 Andrew Seinet-Spaulding DT; 53 Shaq Smith LB; 8 Nick Statz DB; 36 Darius Williams LB
Italics indicate American player • **Bold** indicates Global player

== Coaching staff ==
Calgary Stampeders staff
Front office: President and general manager – John Hufnagel; Director of player personnel – Brendan Mahoney; Director of U.S. Scouting – Cole Hufnagel; Football administration director – Molly Campbell; Director of football operations – Nick Bojda; CFL draft coordinator – Dwayne Cameron; Head coaches: Head coach – Dave Dickenson; Assistant head coach – Mark Kilam; Offensive coaches: Offensive coordinator and offensive line – Pat DelMonaco; Quarterbacks – Marc Mueller; Receivers – Marquay McDaniel; Running backs – T.J. Vernieri	Defensive coaches: Defensive coordinator – Brent Monson; Defensive line – Cornell Brown; Linebackers – Bob Slowik; Defensive backs – Dwayne Cameron; Special teams coaches: Special teams coordinator – Mark Kilam; Strength and conditioning: Strength and conditioning – Taylor Altilio; → Coaching staff
