= Jamon Meredith =

American football player (born 1986)

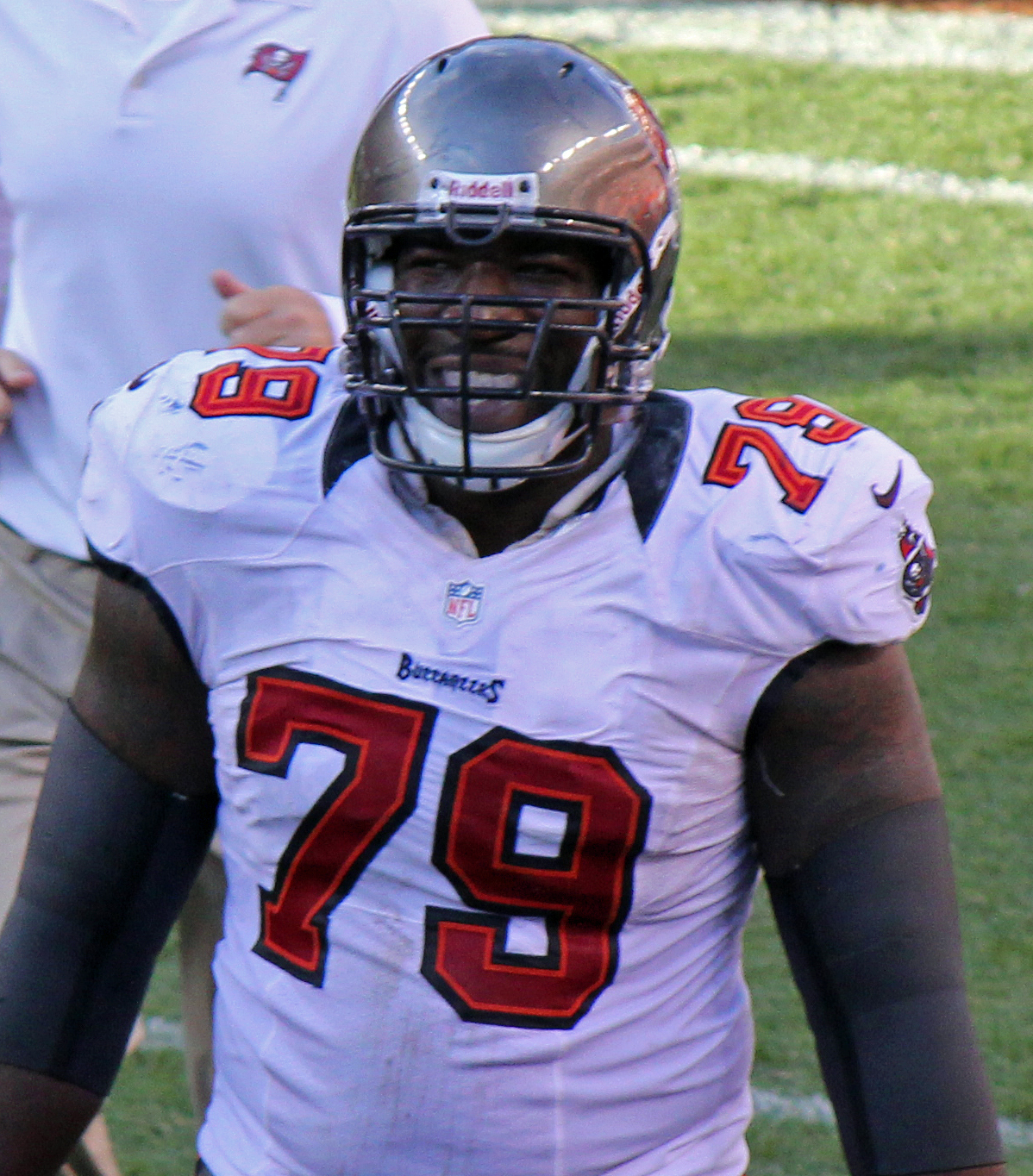
- Meredith with the Tampa Bay Buccaneers in 2012

No. 79, 69, 64
- Position: Offensive tackle

Personal information
- Born: May 11, 1986 (age 40); Simpsonville, South Carolina, U.S.
- Listed height: 6 ft 5 in (1.96 m)
- Listed weight: 312 lb (142 kg)

Career information
- High school: Hillcrest (Simpsonville)
- College: South Carolina
- NFL draft: 2009: 5th round, 162nd overall pick

Career history
- Green Bay Packers (2009)*; Buffalo Bills (2009–2010); Detroit Lions (2010); New York Giants (2010); Pittsburgh Steelers (2011); Tampa Bay Buccaneers (2012–2013); Indianapolis Colts (2014); Green Bay Packers (2014); Cincinnati Bengals (2014); Tennessee Titans (2014–2015)
- * Offseason or practice squad member only

Career NFL statistics
- Games played: 51
- Games started: 24
- Stats at Pro Football Reference

James Jamon Meredith (born May 11, 1986) is an American former professional football player who was an offensive tackle in the National Football League (NFL). He was selected by the Green Bay Packers in the fifth round of the 2009 NFL draft. He played college football at South Carolina.

Meredith was also a member of the Buffalo Bills, Detroit Lions, New York Giants, Pittsburgh Steelers, Tampa Bay Buccaneers, Green Bay Packers, and Cincinnati Bengals.

== Early life ==
Meredith attended Hillcrest High School in Simpsonville, South Carolina, where he was a two-way lineman. At 6 ft 5 in (1.96 m), 255 lb (116 kg) he projected as defensive end in college.

Regarded as only a two-star recruit Rivals.com, Meredith was not ranked among the nation's top defensive end prospects. He committed early to South Carolina, choosing the Gamecocks over Clemson.

== College career ==
At South Carolina, Meredith switched from the defensive to the offensive line. In his initial year, he saw action in one game, getting in for three plays against Vanderbilt, but was later granted a redshirt year. In his redshirt freshman year, he earned four starts at right tackle, including the 2005 Independence Bowl against Missouri.

As a sophomore, Meredith started all 13 games on the Gamecocks offensive line, the first seven games at right tackle, and then moved to left tackle for the final six contests. He garnered SEC offensive lineman of the week honors after helping the Gamecocks to a 31-28 victory over arch-rival Clemson, in which he anchored an offensive line that held Gaines Adams and the athletic Clemson defensive front without a quarterback sack.

In 2007, he started all 12 games at left tackle. In his senior year, he had to sit out the first two games due to an NCAA eligibility ruling stemming from his freshman season. He later sat out a couple games with an ankle injury, and played most of the season at left guard.

== Professional career ==
=== Pre-draft ===
Meredith was considered as one of the better offensive tackles in the 2009 NFL draft, but was projected to play guard or right tackle in the NFL because he lacked the top athleticism for left tackle.

Pre-draft measurables
Height	Weight	40-yard dash	20-yard shuttle	Three-cone drill	Vertical jump	Broad jump	Bench press
6 ft 5 in (1.96 m)	304 lb (138 kg)	4.99 s	4.82 s	8.01 s	28 in (0.71 m)	8 ft 9 in (2.67 m)	31 reps
All values from NFL Combine.

=== Green Bay Packers (first stint) ===
Meredith was selected in the fifth round, 162nd overall, by the Green Bay Packers. He was released on September 5, 2009 and re-signed to the team's practice squad.

=== Buffalo Bills ===
Meredith was signed off the Green Bay Packers' practice squad by the Buffalo Bills on September 22, 2009 after offensive tackle Brad Butler suffered a season-ending injury.

Meredith was waived on October 4, 2010.

=== Detroit Lions ===
Meredith was claimed by the Detroit Lions on October 5, 2010. He was waived on October 17.

=== New York Giants ===
On October 18, 2010, the New York Giants claimed Meredith off waivers. He was waived on September 3, 2011.

=== Pittsburgh Steelers ===
Meredith signed with the Pittsburgh Steelers on September 13, 2011.

=== Tampa Bay Buccaneers ===
Meredith signed with the Tampa Bay Buccaneers on March 21, 2012.

He became the starting right guard on October 14, 2012. He replaced backup guard Ted Larsen, who had been starting for right guard Davin Joseph after he had been lost for the season due to injury. The Buccaneers released Meredith on August 29, 2014.

=== Indianapolis Colts ===
Meredith signed with the Indianapolis Colts on September 3, 2014. He was released on November 4, 2014.

=== Green Bay Packers (second stint) ===
Meredith re-signed with the Green Bay Packers on November 8, 2014. He was released on November 15, 2014.

=== Cincinnati Bengals ===
Meredith signed with the Cincinnati Bengals on November 25, 2014. On December 2, 2014, he was waived.

=== Tennessee Titans ===
Meredith was signed to the Titans' roster on December 9, 2014.
