= Dalton Schoen =

American-Canadian football player (born 1996)

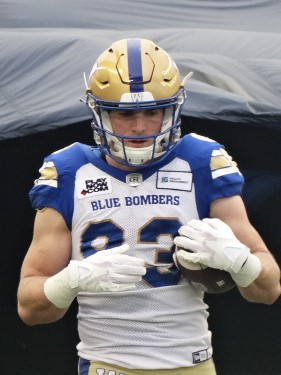
- Schoen with the Winnipeg Blue Bombers in 2022

Profile
- Position: Wide receiver

Personal information
- Born: October 13, 1996 (age 30); Overland Park, Kansas, U.S.
- Listed height: 6 ft 1 in (1.85 m)
- Listed weight: 205 lb (93 kg)

Career information
- High school: Blue Valley Northwest (Overland Park, Kansas)
- College: Kansas State
- NFL draft: 2020: undrafted

Career history
- Los Angeles Chargers (2020)*; Kansas City Chiefs (2021)*; Washington Football Team (2021)*; Kansas City Chiefs (2021)*; Winnipeg Blue Bombers (2022–2025)
- * Offseason or practice squad member only

Awards and highlights
- CFL's Most Outstanding Rookie Award (2022); Jackie Parker Trophy (2022); 2× CFL All-Star (2022, 2023); 2× CFL West All-Star (2022, 2023); CFL receiving yards leader (2022)

Career CFL statistics as of 2025
- Receptions: 177
- Receiving yards: 3,018
- Receiving touchdowns: 28
- Stats at CFL.ca
- Stats at Pro Football Reference

Dalton J. Schoen (born October 13, 1996) is an American professional football wide receiver. He most recently played for the Winnipeg Blue Bombers of the Canadian Football League (CFL). He played college football at Kansas State. Schoen has also been a member of the Los Angeles Chargers, Kansas City Chiefs, and Washington Football Team.

== College career ==
He was a walk-on with the Kansas State Wildcats, where he red-shirted in 2015 before becoming a starter from the 2016-2019 seasons. He finished his college career ranking seventh in Wildcats history in yards per completion and his 1,569 career receiving yards were good for 15th in school history.

== Professional career ==
Pre-draft measurables
Height	Weight	Arm length	Hand span	40-yard dash	10-yard split	20-yard split	20-yard shuttle	Three-cone drill	Vertical jump	Broad jump	Bench press
6 ft 1 in (1.85 m)	206 lb (93 kg)	30 5/8 in (0.78 m)	9 1/4 in (0.23 m)	4.50 s	1.57 s	2.59 s	4.07 s	6.87 s	35.0 in (0.89 m)	9 ft 4 in (2.84 m)	15 reps
All values from Pro Day

=== Los Angeles Chargers ===
On April 25, 2020, Schoen signed with the Los Angeles Chargers as an undrafted free agent. He was waived on September 4, 2020.

=== Kansas City Chiefs (first stint) ===
On February 12, 2021, Schoen signed a reserve/future contract with the Kansas City Chiefs. He was waived on August 30, 2021.

=== Washington Football Team ===
On September 17, 2021, Schoen signed with the practice squad of the Washington Football Team. He was released off the practice squad eleven days later.

=== Kansas City Chiefs (second stint) ===
On December 23, 2021, Schoen signed with the practice squad of the Chiefs. He was released off the practice squad six days later.

=== Winnipeg Blue Bombers ===
Schoen was signed by the Blue Bombers prior to the start of the 2022 CFL season. In the week five away game against the BC Lions, Schoen had his first 100 yard game and also his first two touchdown game as a professional. As a result he was named a top performer of the week by the CFL. Schoen continued his strong rookie season, he finished the season in the month of October and was named a top performer of the month with five touchdowns and 323 yards receiving. Schoen finished the season leading the league in receiving yards and receiving touchdowns, as a result he was the West Division's nominee for the league's Most Outstanding Rookie Award. On November 17, 2022, Schoen was declared the CFL's Most Outstanding Rookie for the 2022 Season. Following his rookie season in the CFL, Schoen had NFL workouts for the Minnesota Vikings, Arizona Cardinals, and Cincinnati Bengals. Schoen led the league in touchdown catches with 10 in 2023 and put up 1,222 receiving yards. However Schoen injured his ankle on October 6 and did not play again until the Grey Cup where the Bombers lost 28-24.

On February 6, 2024, the Blue Bombers announced that Schoen had signed a one-year contract extension with the team. Schoen tore his anterior cruciate ligament during the fourth game of the 2024 CFL season, ending his year. Schoen re-injured and tore his anterior cruciate ligament in 2025, ending his season on the injured list for the third year in a row.

Schoen became a free agent when his contract expired on February 10, 2026.

== Statistics ==
Receiving		Regular season						Postseason
Year	Team	Games	Rec	Yards	Avg	Long	TD	Games	Rec	Yards	Avg	Long	TD
2022	WPG	18	70	1,441	20.6	81	16	2	6	114	19.0	39	1
2023	WPG	16	72	1,233	17.1	71	10	1	3	36	12.0	15	0
2024	WPG	3	14	159	11.4	19	0	Did not play - injured
2025	WPG	5	22	255	11.6	27	2	Did not play - injured
CFL totals		42	177	3,077	17.4	81	28	3	9	150	16.7	39	1

== Personal life ==
While playing at Kansas State, Schoen completed a bachelor's degree in mechanical engineering before pursuing a master's degree in data analytics.
