= Dominique Rhymes =

American gridiron football player (born 1993)

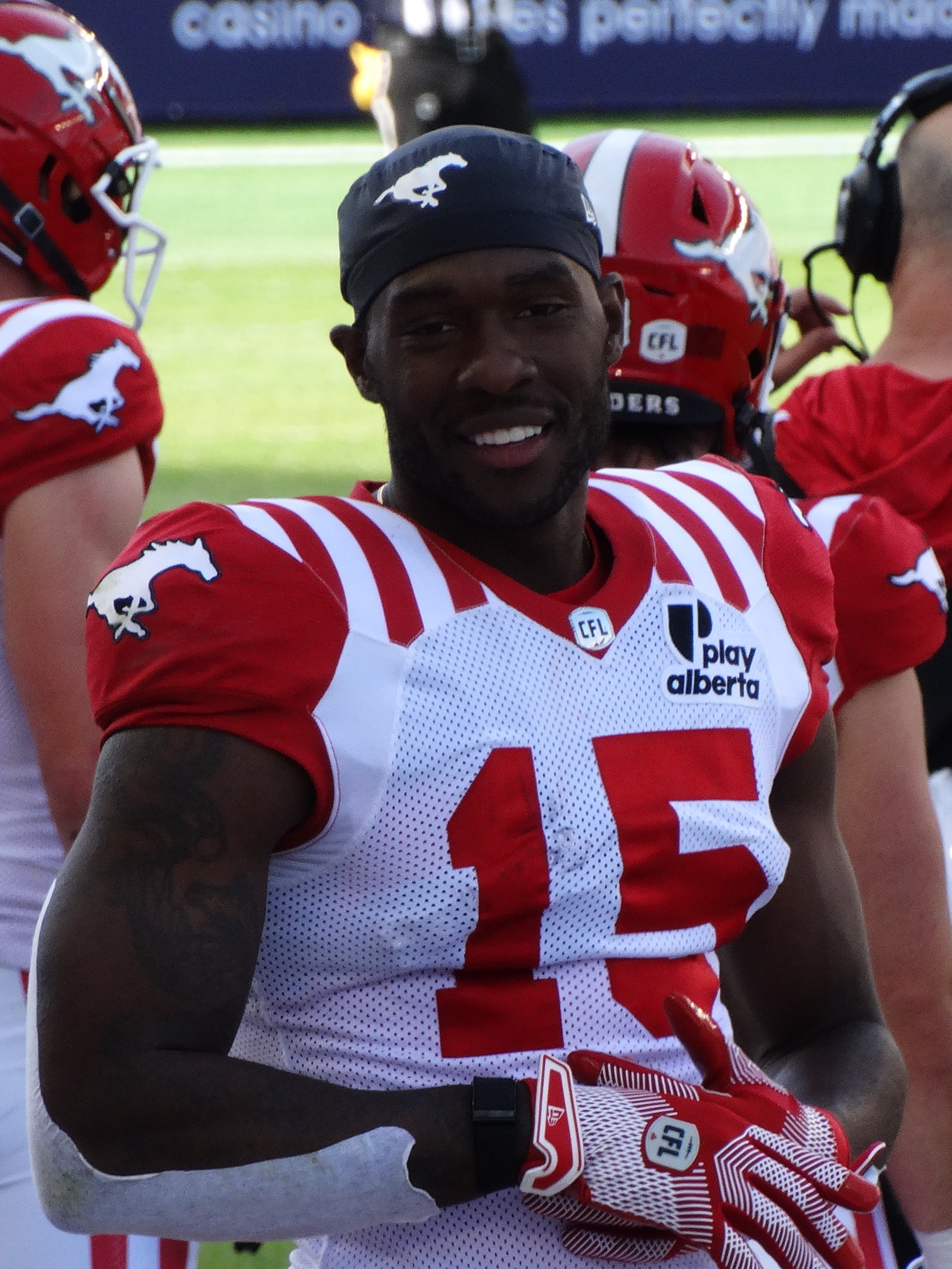
- Rhymes with the Calgary Stampeders in 2025

Profile
- Position: Wide receiver

Personal information
- Born: June 20, 1993 (age 33); Miami, Florida, U.S.
- Listed height: 6 ft 4 in (1.93 m)
- Listed weight: 215 lb (98 kg)

Career information
- High school: Miami Northwestern Senior
- College: Florida International (2011–2014); Murray State (2015)
- NFL draft: 2016: undrafted

Career history
- Ottawa Redblacks (2017–2019); BC Lions (2020–2023); Ottawa Redblacks (2024); Calgary Stampeders (2025)

Awards and highlights
- CFL All-Star (2022); CFL West All-Star (2022)

Career CFL statistics as of 2025
- Games played: 110
- Targets: 628
- Receptions: 372
- Receiving yards: 5,822
- Receiving touchdowns: 32
- Stats at CFL.ca

Dominique Rhymes (born June 20, 1993) is an American former professional football wide receiver who played in eight seasons in the Canadian Football League (CFL) as a member of the Ottawa Redblacks, BC Lions, and Calgary Stampeders.

== Early life ==
Rymes played at Miami Northwestern Senior High School he is former teammates with professional football player Teddy Bridgewater. His senior year he caught 37 passes for 686 yards and 8 touchdowns. He was considered a three-star recruit coming out of high school.

== College career ==
Rhymes played college football for the FIU Panthers from 2011 to 2014, while using a medical redshirt season in 2014. He then transferred to Murray State University to play for the Racers in 2015.

== Professional career ==
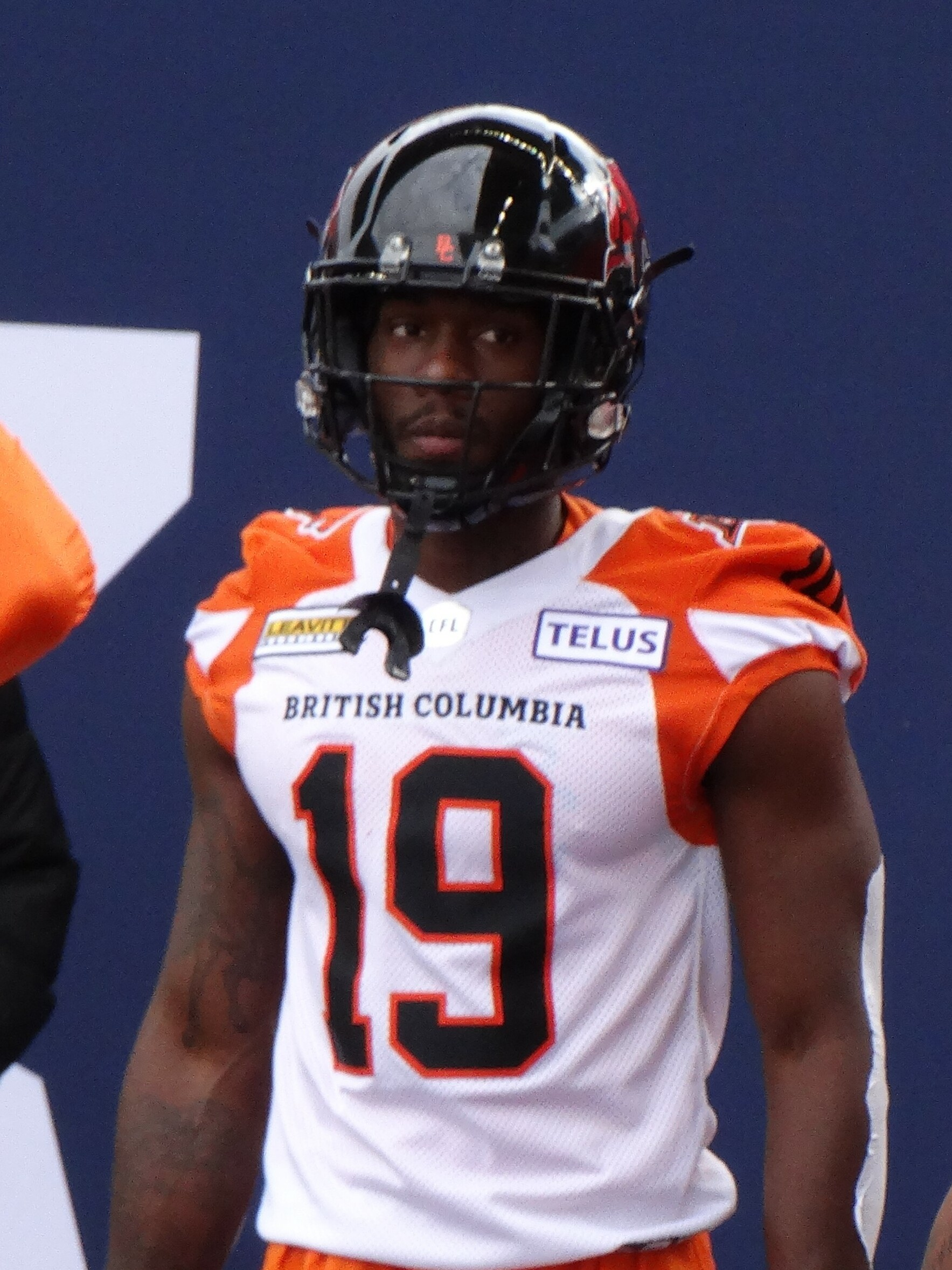
Rhymes with the BC Lions in 2022

=== Ottawa Redblacks (first stint) ===
Rhymes signed with the Ottawa Redblacks of the Canadian Football League (CFL) on May 29, 2017. He saw only limited action in his first two seasons with the Redblacks, catching 37 passes for 522 yards with one touchdown. His third year in the league proved to be a breakout season for Rhymes as he led the Redblacks in receptions (65), receiving yards (1,056) and receiving touchdowns (5). Following the 2019 season Rhymes and the Redblacks were unable to come to an agreement for a new contract and he became a free agent on February 11, 2020.

=== BC Lions ===
On February 21, 2020, Rhymes signed with the BC Lions. However, he did not play in 2020 due to the cancellation of the 2020 CFL season and then signed a one-year contract extension with the team on December 14, 2020. In his first year with the team, in 2021, Rhymes played in eight games where he had 28 catches for 411 yards and one touchdown. At the end of the 2022 season, he was named a CFL All-Star after finishing third in receptions (85), and second in receiving yards (1,401) and touchdowns (11).

On February 12, 2023, Rhymes requested a trade, seeking a larger salary contract extension elsewhere. Nevertheless, the following day on February 13, Rhymes and the Lions agreed to a two-year contract extension through the 2024 season. He played in ten regular season games in 2023, missing time due to injury, where he had 35 receptions for 535 yards and six touchdowns. After giving contract extensions to fellow receivers Keon Hatcher and Alexander Hollins, the Lions released Rhymes on January 17, 2024.

=== Ottawa Redblacks (second stint) ===
On January 22, 2024, it was announced that Rhymes had returned to the Redblacks on a two-year contract. He played in all 18 regular season games where he had 72 receptions for 1,011 yards and two touchdowns. He was released on February 1, 2025, with one year remaining on his contract.

=== Calgary Stampeders ===
On February 4, 2025, it was announced that Rhymes had signed with the Calgary Stampeders. He played in 17 regular season games where he had 50 catches for 886 yards and six touchdowns. He became a free agent upon the expiry of his contract on February 10, 2026. He later announced his retirement on February 20, 2026.
