= Micah Awe =

American gridiron football player (born 1994)

- Awe with the Montreal Alouettes in 2026

Montreal Alouettes
- Position: Linebacker
- Roster status: Active
- CFL status: American

Personal information
- Born: January 4, 1994 (age 32); Lagos, Nigeria
- Listed height: 6 ft 0 in (1.83 m)
- Listed weight: 231 lb (105 kg)

Career information
- High school: Mansfield Summit (Arlington, Texas, U.S.)
- College: Texas Tech
- NFL draft: 2016: undrafted

Career history
- Tampa Bay Buccaneers (2016)*; BC Lions (2017); New York Jets (2018)*; BC Lions (2018); Toronto Argonauts (2019); Winnipeg Blue Bombers (2020); Ottawa Redblacks (2021); BC Lions (2022); Montreal Alouettes (2022); Calgary Stampeders (2023–2024); BC Lions (2025); Montreal Alouettes (2026–present)
- * Offseason or practice squad member only

Awards and highlights
- CFL All-Star (2023); CFL West All-Star (2023)

Career CFL statistics as of 2026
- Games played: 131
- DT–STT: 593–47
- Sacks: 6
- Interceptions: 7
- Forced Fumbles: 7
- Stats at CFL.ca
- Stats at Pro Football Reference

Micah Awe (born January 4, 1994) is a Nigerian professional gridiron football linebacker for the Montreal Alouettes of the Canadian Football League (CFL). He played college football at Texas Tech. Awe has been a member of the Tampa Bay Buccaneers, New York Jets, Toronto Argonauts, Winnipeg Blue Bombers, Ottawa Redblacks, Calgary Stampeders, and BC Lions.

== College career ==
Awe accumulated 171 solo tackles over 51 games for the Texas Tech Red Raiders including 77 stops as a senior and defensive captain in 2015.

== Professional career ==
Pre-draft measurables
Height	Weight	Arm length	Hand span	Wingspan	40-yard dash	10-yard split	20-yard split	20-yard shuttle	Three-cone drill	Vertical jump	Broad jump	Bench press
5 ft 11 1/8 in (1.81 m)	216 lb (98 kg)	30 7/8 in (0.78 m)	8 7/8 in (0.23 m)	6 ft 2 7/8 in (1.90 m)	4.67 s	1.59 s	2.72 s	4.27 s	7.03 s	39.0 in (0.99 m)	10 ft 7 in (3.23 m)	16 reps
All values from Pro Day

=== Tampa Bay Buccaneers ===
In May of 2016, Awe was signed by the Tampa Bay Buccaneers following the team's rookie mini-camp, however after failing to make the Buccaneers' 53-man final roster, Awe was signed to the practice squad on September 5, 2016. He was released on September 10, 2016.

=== BC Lions (first stint) ===
On March 7, 2017, Awe signed with the BC Lions of the Canadian Football League (CFL). In his first season with the Lions, Awe recorded 54 defensive tackles, 16 special teams tackles and one forced fumble. On January 31, 2018, Awe was released by the Lions, in order to allow him to pursue a contract with the New York Jets, in his return to the NFL. This action led to the Lions being "heavily fined".

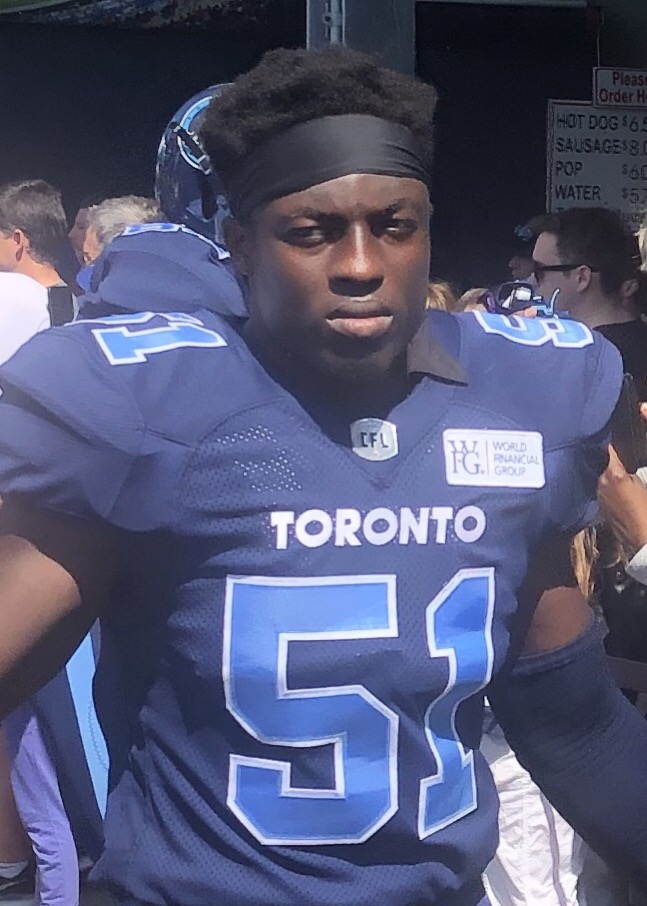
Awe with the Toronto Argonauts in 2019

=== New York Jets ===
On February 1, 2018, Awe signed with the New York Jets. He was waived by the Jets on April 28, 2018, releasing him from his contract.

=== BC Lions (second stint) ===
On August 20, 2018, it was announced that Awe had re-signed with the Lions. Awe dressed for seven games with the team on this stint, and made 31 defensive tackles, as well as three special teams tackles before leaving as a free agent at the conclusion of the season.

=== Toronto Argonauts ===
On February 13, 2019, Awe signed a one-year contract with the Toronto Argonauts. He dressed for ten games with the team during the 2019 CFL season, recording 44 defensive tackles, six special teams tackles, one sack, and one interception. Awe left the Argonauts as a free agent at the conclusion of the season.

=== Winnipeg Blue Bombers ===
On February 18, 2020, it was announced that Awe had signed with the Winnipeg Blue Bombers to a two-year contract. However, he did not play that year, due to the cancellation of the 2020 CFL season, and was released by the Blue Bombers on January 31, 2021.

=== Ottawa Redblacks ===
On February 12, 2021, Awe was signed by the Ottawa Redblacks. He dressed for all 14 of the team's regular season games that year, where he recorded 74 defensive tackles and three sacks. He became a free agent upon the expiry of his contract on February 8, 2022.

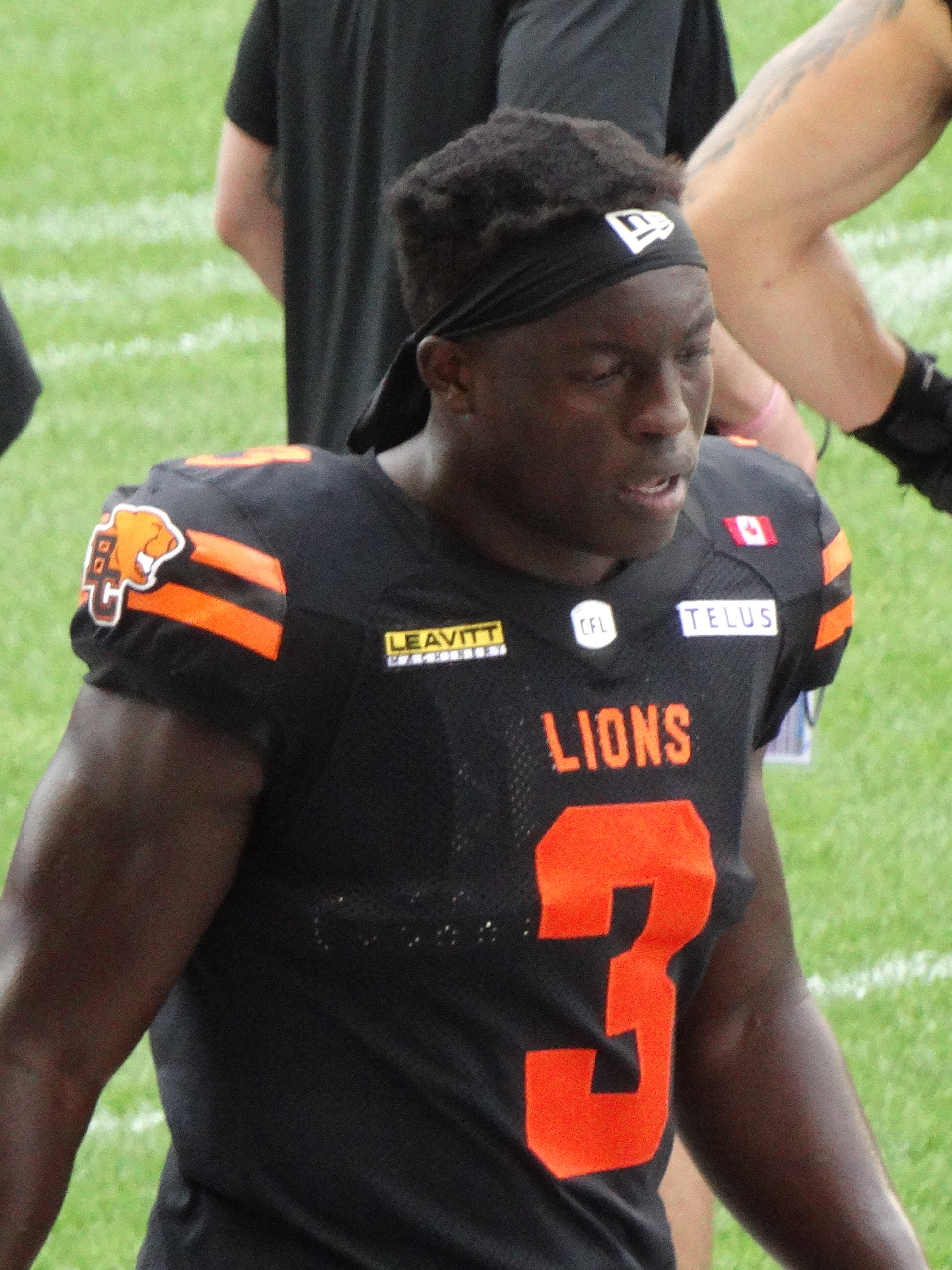
Awe with the BC Lions in 2025

=== BC Lions (third stint) ===
After the start of training camps around the league, Awe signed with the BC Lions for a third time on May 21, 2022. He played in one game for the Lions before requesting to be released from their roster when it was apparent that he would not be a starter with the club. His request was granted on June 23, 2022.

=== Montreal Alouettes (first stint) ===
On July 6, 2022, immediately after the firing of head coach Khari Jones, general manager and new head coach Danny Maciocia announced that Awe had signed with the Montreal Alouettes. After dressing as a backup in his first game with the team on July 14, 2022, against the Edmonton Elks, he started at linebacker for the next 12 regular season games, and recorded 47 defensive tackles, three special teams tackles, one interception, and one forced fumble. However, he suffered a shoulder injury and did not play in the final regular season game, nor the team's two playoff games that year. Awe became a free agent upon the expiry of his contract on February 14, 2023.

=== Calgary Stampeders ===
On February 17, 2023, it was announced that Awe had signed with the Calgary Stampeders. In 2023, he played in all 18 regular season games and set career highs with 134 defensive tackles and three interceptions, along with six special teams tackles, two sacks, and one forced fumble. The 134 defensive tackles was the third-most in a single season in CFL history. For his outstanding season, Awe was named a CFL Division and League All-Star for the first time in his career.

In the 2024 season, Awe again played in 18 games, but had just 69 defensive tackles and four special teams tackles. He became a free agent upon the expiry of his contract on February 11, 2025.

=== BC Lions (fourth stint) ===
On February 11, 2025, it was announced that Awe had signed again with the BC Lions to a two-year contract. He played and started in all 18 regular season games in 2025 where he led the league in defensive tackles with 114. He also had three special teams tackles, two interceptions, and one forced fumble. After the Lions signed fellow linebacker, Darnell Sankey, Awe was released on January 23, 2026.

=== Montreal Alouettes (second stint) ===
On April 7, 2026, the Montreal Alouettes announced that they had signed Awe to a one-year contract.

== Personal life ==
Awe was born in Lagos, Nigeria but moved to the United States when he was three years old. He has three siblings. Awe's mother graduated with her masters from Texas Tech University and his father graduated with his masters in Criminology and Criminal Justice from the University of Texas at Arlington.
