= Cameron Judge =

Canadian gridiron football player (born 1994)

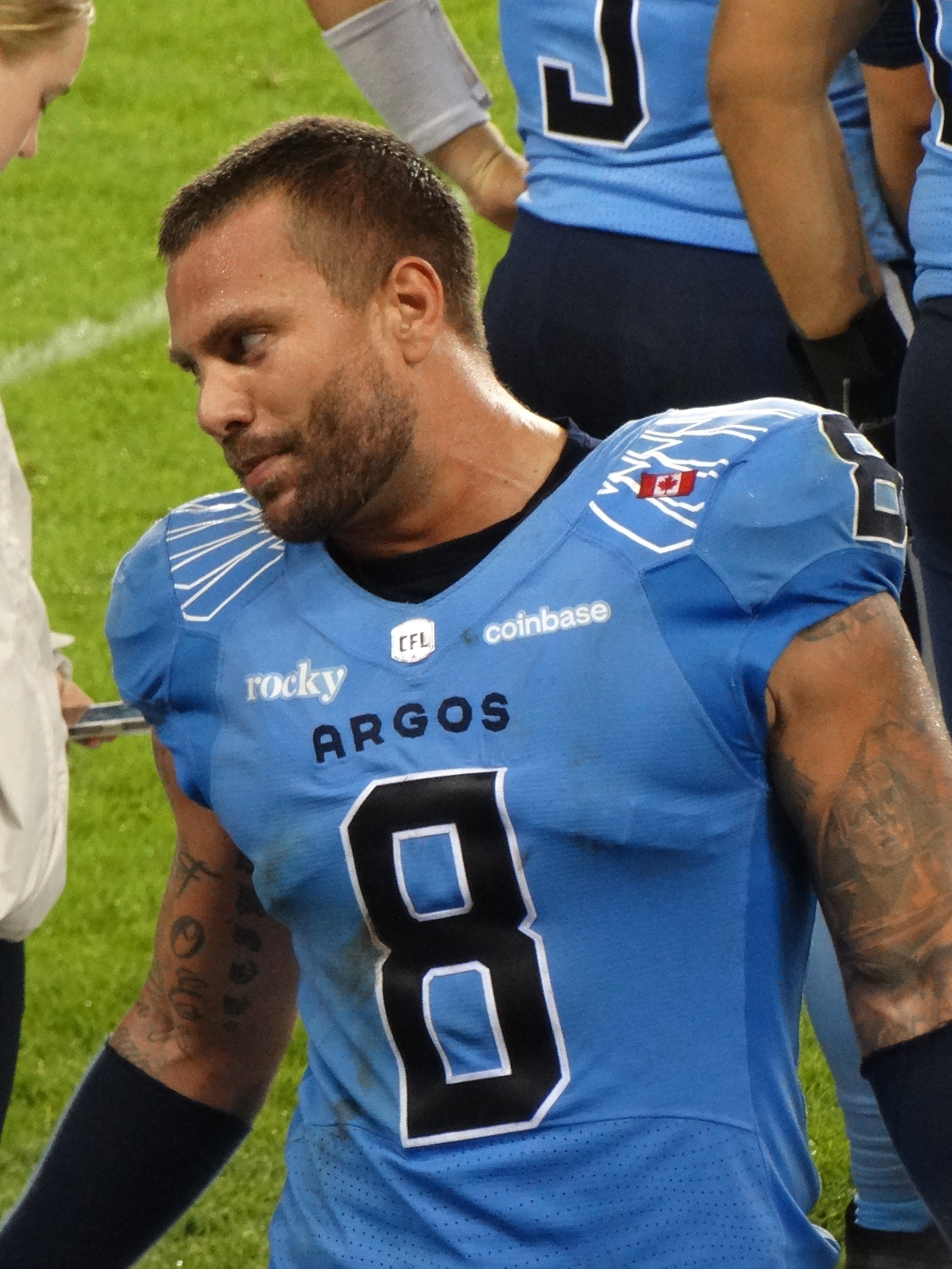
- Judge with the Toronto Argonauts in 2025

No. 8 – Toronto Argonauts
- Position: Linebacker
- Roster status: Active
- CFL status: National

Personal information
- Born: November 29, 1994 (age 31); Montreal, Quebec, Canada
- Listed height: 6 ft 1 in (1.85 m)
- Listed weight: 230 lb (104 kg)

Career information
- High school: Oaks Christian School (Westlake Village, California, U.S.)
- College: UCLA (2013–2016)
- CFL draft: 2017: 1st round, 2nd overall pick

Career history
- Saskatchewan Roughriders (2017–2019); Toronto Argonauts (2021); Calgary Stampeders (2022–2024); Toronto Argonauts (2025–present)

Awards and highlights
- Dr. Beattie Martin Trophy (2019); CFL All-Star (2022); CFL West All-Star (2022)
- Stats at CFL.ca

Cameron Judge (born November 29, 1994) is a Canadian professional football linebacker for the Toronto Argonauts of the Canadian Football League (CFL). He was named a CFL All-Star in 2022 and was named the CFL's West Division Most Outstanding Player in 2019.

== Early life ==
Judge was born on November 29, 1994, in Montreal, Quebec, to actor Christopher Judge and Margaret Judge, a former model. The family moved from Montreal (where Christopher Judge had been working on the television series Sirens) to Los Angeles when Judge was three months old. When Judge was three years old, the family moved to British Columbia and split their time living between Vancouver and Victoria. It was during his time in Vancouver, that Judge developed an interest in football and started playing minor football. When Judge was twelve years old, the family moved back to California, primarily to give Judge and his older brother, Christopher, a better environment to develop their football skills.

After one year as a running back and linebacker for the junior varsity team, Judge became a three-year varsity starter at linebacker for Oaks Christian School in Westlake Village, California, under the coaching of Bill Redell and legendary NFL linebacker Clay Matthews Jr. Judge was rated a 4-star recruit and a top five linebacker on the West Coast.

== College career ==
Judge accepted a scholarship offer from UCLA where he played college football for the team from 2013 to 2016 and was a team co-captain in 2015. He and other members of the defensive unit for UCLA were considered the best group of players in the linebacker position in the Pac-12 Conference. During his time there Judge played both inside and outside linebacker positions, and was a special teams captain for the Pac-12 Conference team. He played in 47 games where he had 30 solo tackles, 16 assisted tackles, one interception, and one forced fumble.

== Professional career ==
Pre-draft measurables
Height	Weight	Arm length	Hand span	Wingspan	40-yard dash	10-yard split	20-yard split	20-yard shuttle	Three-cone drill	Vertical jump	Broad jump	Bench press
6 ft 0 7/8 in (1.85 m)	220 lb (100 kg)	31 in (0.79 m)	9 3/4 in (0.25 m)	6 ft 3 3/4 in (1.92 m)	4.55 s	1.59 s	2.64 s	4.19 s	6.81 s	36.5 in (0.93 m)	10 ft 11 in (3.33 m)	19 reps
All values from Pro Day

=== Saskatchewan Roughriders ===
Judge was selected in the first round, second overall, in the 2017 CFL draft, by the Saskatchewan Roughriders, but missed training camp to complete final exams and attend his graduation. He then signed with the team on June 18, 2017. He made the team's active roster following training camp and made his professional debut on June 22, 2017, against the Montreal Alouettes, in Montreal, where he recorded one special teams tackle. He played in just three regular season games, recording three special teams tackles, before suffering a season-ending injury.

In his sophomore season in 2018, Judge played in all 18 regular season games where he had 41 defensive tackles, three special teams tackles, two sacks, and one forced fumble. In 2019, he earned a starting job in training camp and made his first professional start on June 13, 2019, against the Hamilton Tiger-Cats. In the final regular season game, on November 2, 2019, against the Edmonton Eskimos, Judge scored his first professional touchdown after returning an interception 29 yards for the score. He played and started in 17 regular season games where he recorded 61 defensive tackles, 12 special teams tackles, five pass knockdowns, five sacks, two interceptions, and one forced fumble. Judge was the unanimous selection for the Saskatchewan Roughriders Most Outstanding Canadian, and won the Dr. Beattie Martin Trophy as the West Division's Most Outstanding Canadian. After the CFL canceled the 2020 season due to the COVID-19 pandemic, he chose to opt-out of his contract with the Roughriders on August 28, 2020. Judge played three seasons for the Riders, appearing in 38 games, registering 102 tackles, seven quarterback sacks, two interceptions, two forced fumbles, and one defensive touchdown.

=== Toronto Argonauts (first stint) ===
On February 17, 2021, it was announced that Judge had signed a one-year contract with the Toronto Argonauts. He played in nine regular season games, starting in eight, where he recorded 13 defensive tackles and one special teams tackle.

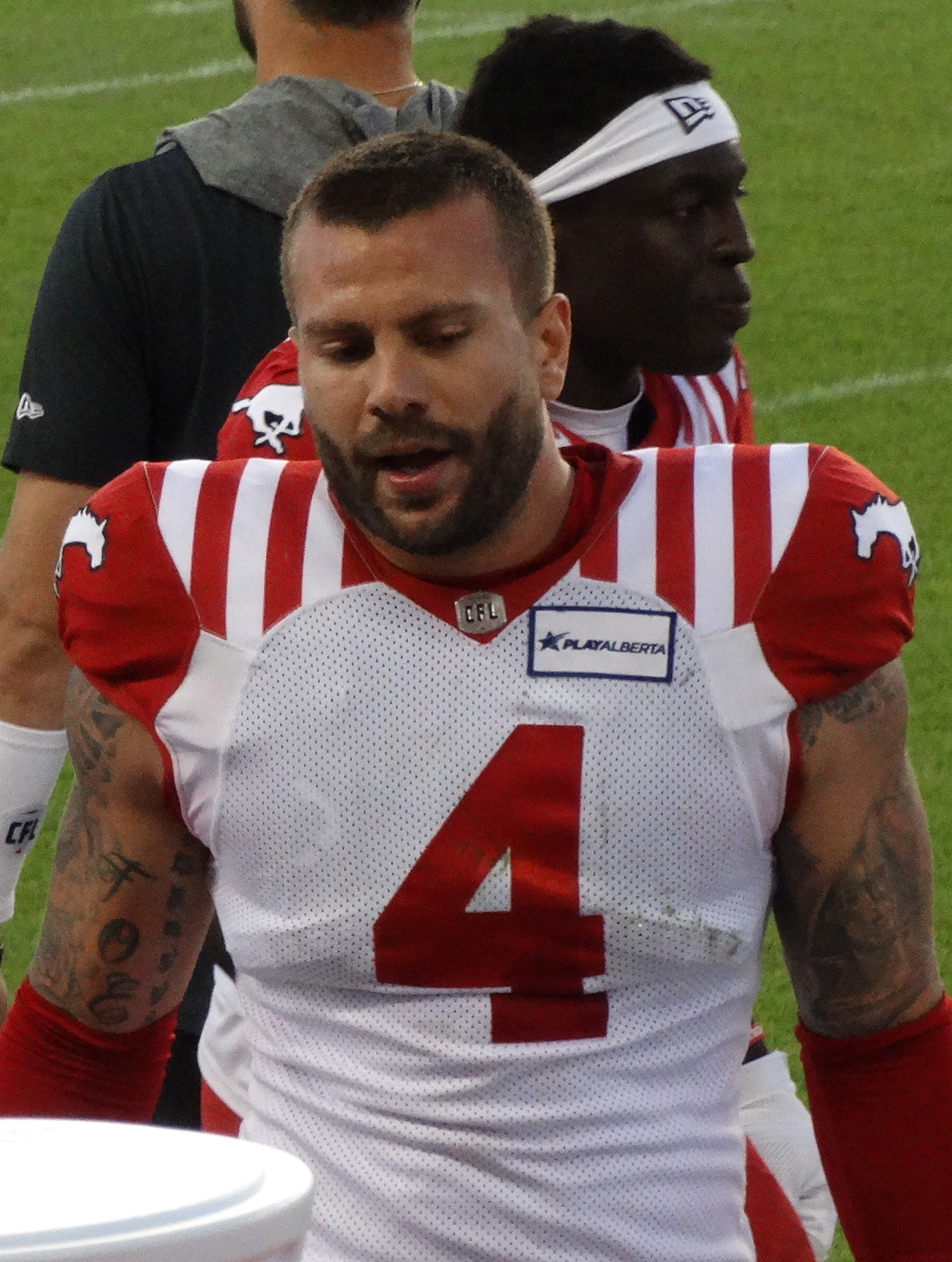
Judge with the Calgary Stampeders in 2024

=== Calgary Stampeders ===
On February 4, 2022, Judge was traded to the Calgary Stampeders in exchange for Royce Metchie as both players had contracts expiring the following week. Judge and the Stamps agreed to a contract later that same day. In September 2022, he was suspended one game for punching BC Lions wide receiver Lucky Whitehead in a post-game altercation. Judge finished the 2022 season having played and started in 17 regular season games, recording 78 defensive tackles, two special teams tackles, five sacks, two interceptions, two forced fumbles, five fumble recoveries, and two touchdowns. He was then named a divisional and CFL All-Star for the first time in his career.

In 2023, Judge played and started in 17 regular season games where he had a career-high 90 defensive tackles and five interceptions along with one special teams tackle, three pass knockdowns, two sacks, two forced fumbles, one fumble recovery, and one touchdown. In the 2023 season, he started in 18 regular season games where he had a 73 defensive tackles, two pass knockdowns, one sack, one forced fumble, and one fumble recovery.

=== Toronto Argonauts (second stint) ===
On January 10, 2025, Judge was traded from the Stampeders to the Toronto Argonauts in exchange for defensive lineman Folarin Orimolade. He played in all 18 regular season games in 2025 where he recorded 79 defensive tackles, four special teams tackles, three sacks, two interceptions, two forced fumbles, and one touchdown.
