= Mike Rose (Canadian football) =

American gridiron football player (born 1992)

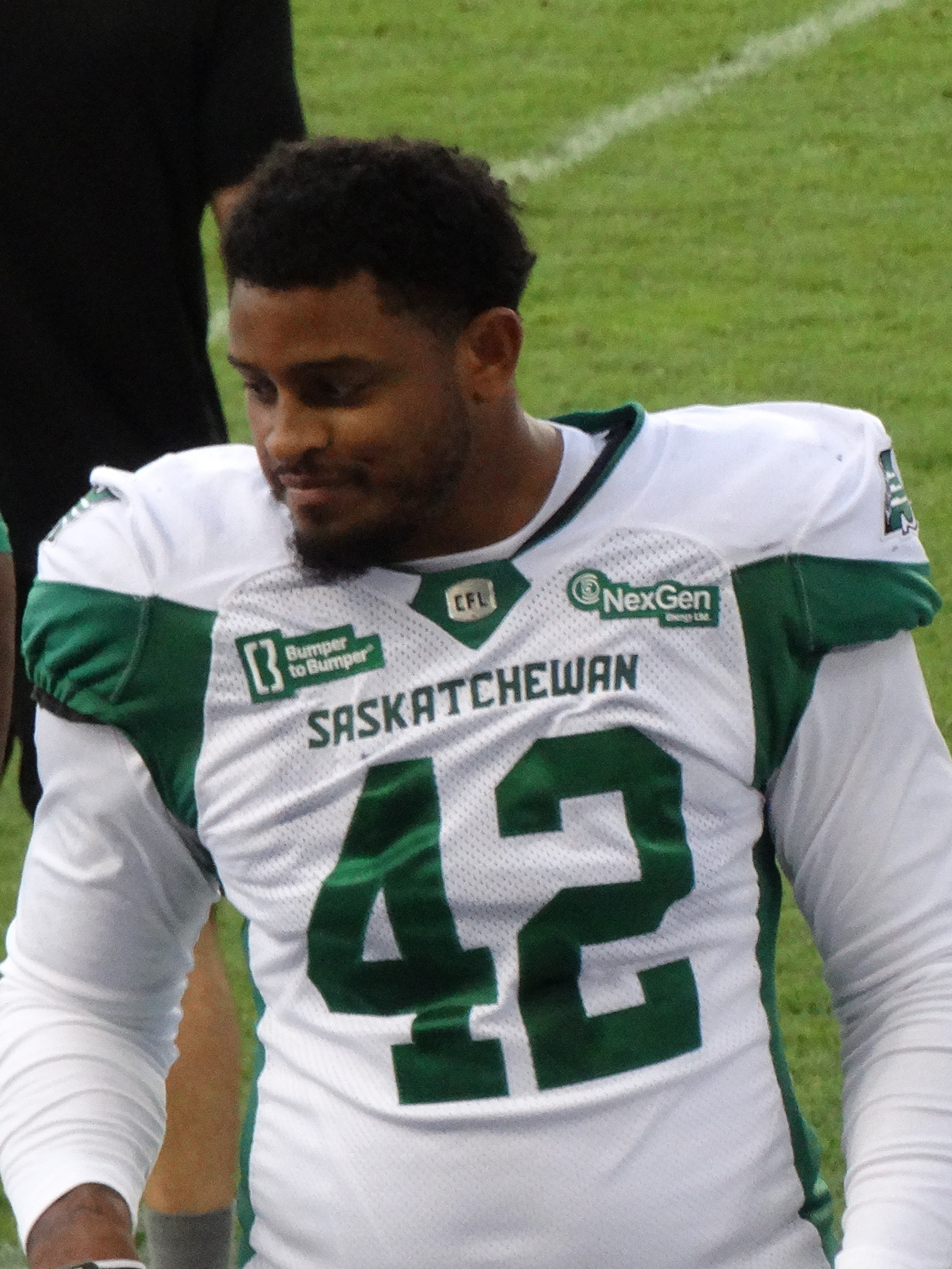
- Rose with the Saskatchewan Roughriders in 2025

No. 42 – Saskatchewan Roughriders
- Position: Defensive lineman
- Roster status: Active
- CFL status: American

Personal information
- Born: July 23, 1992 (age 34); Fountain Inn, South Carolina, U.S.
- Listed height: 6 ft 2 in (1.88 m)
- Listed weight: 258 lb (117 kg)

Career information
- High school: Hillcrest High
- College: North Carolina State

Career history
- New York Giants (2016)*; Calgary Stampeders (2017–2024); Saskatchewan Roughriders (2025–present)
- * Offseason or practice squad member only

Awards and highlights
- 2× Grey Cup champion (2018, 2025); 3× CFL All-Star (2021, 2022, 2023); 4× CFL West All-Star (2021, 2022, 2023, 2024)
- Stats at CFL.ca

Mike Rose (born July 23, 1992) is an American professional football player who is a defensive lineman for the Saskatchewan Roughriders of the Canadian Football League (CFL). He played college football for NC State Wolfpack from 2011 to 2015.

== College career ==
=== Freshman and sophomore years ===
In 2012, after playing at Hillcrest High School and redshirting his first year, Rose played in a few of games racking up 5 solo tackles, 2 assisted tackles, and 1 tackle for loss. But Rose made a name for himself when he made a key play by blocking a punt against Florida State helping the Wolfpack win in an upset against the Seminoles. As a Sophomore In 2013, he played in 7 games finishing the year with 9 solo tackles, 9 assisted tackles, 3.5 tackles for loss, 2 sacks, 2 pass deflections, and 2 fumble recoveries.

=== Junior and senior years ===
As a junior in 2014, Rose played in every game and ended the season with 28 solo tackles, 17 assisted tackles, 13 tackles for loss, 4 sacks, 2 pass deflections, 2 fumble recoveries, and a forced fumble leading the Wolfpack to a 9-4 season. In 2015, Rose played in every game again as a senior ending up with 34 solo tackles, 15 assisted tackles, 15.5 tackles for loss, 9 sacks, a fumble recovery, and 2 forced fumbles.

== Professional career ==
Pre-draft measurables
Height	Weight	Arm length	Hand span	Wingspan	40-yard dash	10-yard split	20-yard split	20-yard shuttle	Three-cone drill	Vertical jump	Broad jump	Bench press
6 ft 2 1/2 in (1.89 m)	261 lb (118 kg)	33 3/8 in (0.85 m)	9 3/8 in (0.24 m)	6 ft 9 in (2.06 m)	4.67 s	1.66 s	2.69 s	4.46 s	7.47 s	33.5 in (0.85 m)	9 ft 8 in (2.95 m)	17 reps
All values from Pro Day

=== New York Giants ===
After going undrafted in the 2016 NFL draft he went to New York Giants tryouts where he was signed. On August 30, 2016, he was waived by the Giants.

=== Calgary Stampeders ===
Rose signed with the Calgary Stampeders on May 24, 2017. He spent time on the practice roster and reserve roster before making his professional debut on November 3, 2017 against the Winnipeg Blue Bombers. He played in one regular season game in 2018 and was on the injured reserve list when the Stampeders won the 106th Grey Cup. Rose had his breakthrough season in 2019 when he played in all 18 regular season games and recorded 46 defensive tackles, four special teams tackles, five sacks, and one forced fumble. He re-signed with the Stampeders to a two-year extension on January 21, 2020, but did not play in 2020 due to the cancellation of the 2020 CFL season.

In 2021, Rose played in 11 out of 14 regular season games in a shortened season where he tallied 24 defensive tackles, seven sacks, and one forced fumble. He was then named a CFL All-Star for the first time in his career at the end of the season. In the following season, he played in 17 regular season games where he had 25 defensive tackles, one special teams tackle, seven sacks, and one forced fumble, along with his first career interception and first blocked kick. He was again named a CFL All-Star.

Rose played in all 18 regular season games in 2023 where he had 24 defensive tackles, a career-high 11 sacks, one forced fumble, and one fumble recovery. He was a CFL All-Star for the third straight season in 2023. In 2024, he played in 18 games where he had 19 defensive tackles, six sacks, and one interception that he returned 83 yards for his first career touchdown on September 7, 2024. At season's end, he was named a CFL West All-Star for the fourth straight season. However, Rose was released in the following off-season on January 27, 2025.

=== Saskatchewan Roughriders ===
On February 1, 2025, it was announced that Rose had signed with the Saskatchewan Roughriders.
