= Juwan Simpson =

American gridiron football player and coach (born 1984)

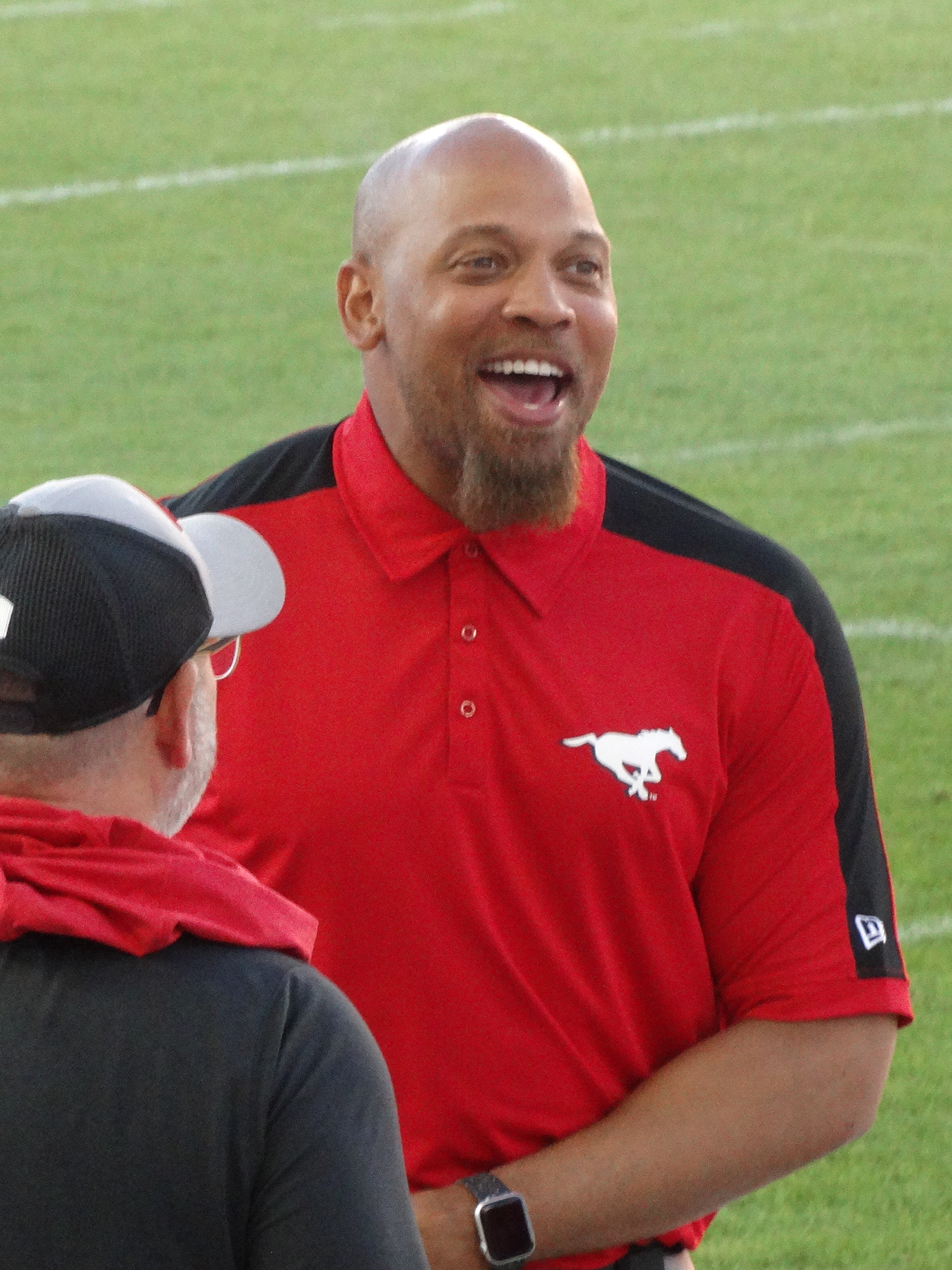
- Simpson with the Calgary Stampeders in 2024

Personal information
- Born: July 8, 1984 (age 42); Decatur, Alabama, U.S.
- Listed height: 6 ft 3 in (1.91 m)
- Listed weight: 233 lb (106 kg)

Career information
- College: Alabama

Career history

Playing
- Green Bay Packers (2007)*; Calgary Stampeders (2008–2015)
- * Offseason or practice squad member only

Coaching
- Calgary Stampeders (2023–2024) Defensive line coach

Awards and highlights
- 2× Grey Cup champion (2008, 2014); Norm Fieldgate Trophy (2010); CFL All-Star (2010); 2× CFL West All-Star (2010, 2012)
- Stats at CFL.ca

Juwan Simpson (born Juwan Garth on July 8, 1984) is an American former professional football linebacker who played eight seasons for the Calgary Stampeders of the Canadian Football League (CFL). He was also the defensive line coach of the Stampeders for two seasons.

== College career ==
Simpson played college football for the Alabama Crimson Tide.

== Professional career ==
Simpson was signed by the Green Bay Packers as an undrafted free agent in 2007. He was later signed by the Calgary Stampeders whom he played with for eight seasons and won two Grey Cup championships in 2008 and 2014. He announced his retirement on October 10, 2019, four years after his last game with the Stampeders.

== Coaching career ==
On January 3, 2023, it was announced that Simpson had been hired as the defensive line coach for the Calgary Stampeders. He held this position for the 2023 and 2024 seasons. After the 2024 season, the Stampeders announced that Simpson would not be retained on the team’s coaching staff for the 2025 season. He has since transitioned to high school coaching at Hazel Green High School. He joined the Trojans coaching staff in December 2025.

In May 2026, Simpson was named the head coach of the East Limestone High School Indians Football Team.
