= Peyton Logan =

American gridiron football player (born 1998)

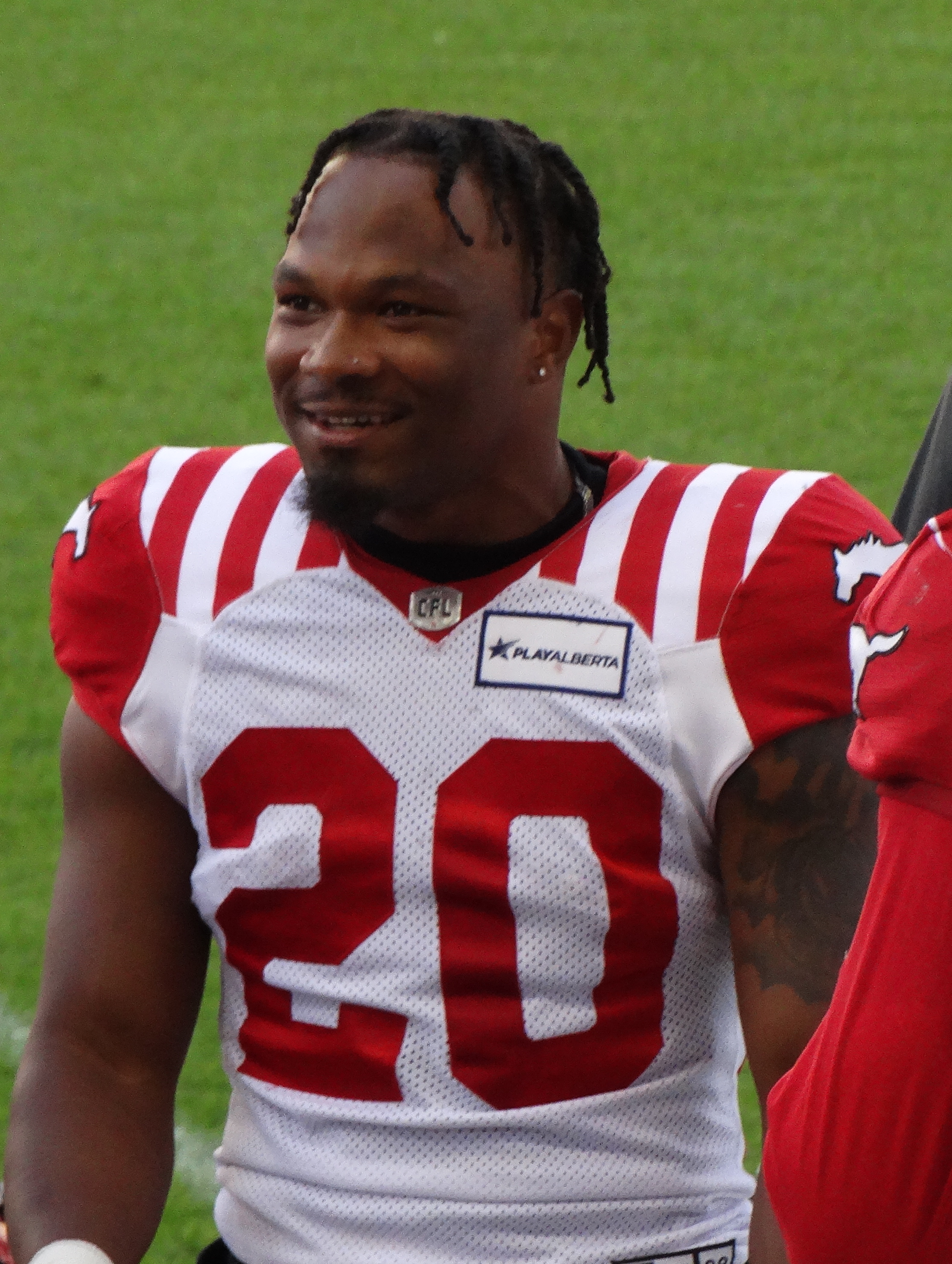
- Logan with the Calgary Stampeders in 2024

Profile
- Positions: Running back, kick returner

Personal information
- Born: November 28, 1998 (age 27); Memphis, Tennessee, U.S.
- Listed height: 5 ft 8 in (1.73 m)
- Listed weight: 189 lb (86 kg)

Career information
- High school: Horn Lake High
- College: Tennessee-Martin

Career history
- Calgary Stampeders (2022–2024); Winnipeg Blue Bombers (2025); Toronto Argonauts (2026)*
- * Offseason or practice squad member only

Career CFL statistics as of 2025
- Games played: 39
- Carries: 137
- Yards: 887
- Rushing touchdowns: 5
- Receptions: 44
- Yards: 340
- Stats at CFL.ca

Peyton Logan (born November 28, 1998) is an American professional football running back.

== College career ==
Logan played college football for the UT Martin Skyhawks from 2017 to 2021. He played in 52 games where he had 2,513 rushing yards and 12 touchdowns as well as 86 receptions for 727 yards and four touchdowns.

== Professional career ==
=== Calgary Stampeders ===
On May 4, 2022, it was announced that Logan had signed with the Calgary Stampeders. He began the 2022 season on the practice roster, but made his professional debut in Week 2 against the Hamilton Tiger-Cats on June 18, 2022, as a backup running back. In that game, he had nine carries for 45 yards, four receptions for 59 yards, and two kickoff returns for 40 yards. He scored his first career touchdown on July 7, 2022, against the Edmonton Elks when he returned a missed field goal 122 yards for a touchdown. In that same game, he had five carries for 45 yards and scored his first rushing touchdown while being named a CFL Top Performer for week 5. He became a free agent upon the expiry of his contract on February 11, 2025.

=== Winnipeg Blue Bombers ===
On February 11, 2025, Logan signed a two-year contract with the Winnipeg Blue Bombers. He played in three games in 2025 while spending time on the injured list where he had one carry for a two-yard loss and three catches for ten yards. He was released in the following offseason on January 15, 2026.

=== Toronto Argonauts ===
On January 19, 2026, it was announced that Logan had signed with the Toronto Argonauts. He was released on May 31 as part of final roster cuts.

== Personal life ==
Logan was born to parents Patrick and Phyllis Logan and has one sibling, Patrice.
