= 2022 CFL season =

Canadian Football League season

- Duration: June 9 – October 29, 2022
- East champions: Toronto Argonauts
- West champions: Winnipeg Blue Bombers

109th Grey Cup
- Date: November 20, 2022
- Venue: Mosaic Stadium, Regina
- Champions: Toronto Argonauts

CFL seasons
- ← 2021 2023 →

Locations of the active CFL teams West East

The 2022 CFL season was the 68th season of modern-day Canadian football. Officially, it was the 64th season of the Canadian Football League. The regular season began on June 9 and ended on October 29, with 18 games played per team over 21 weeks. Regina hosted the 109th Grey Cup on November 20, 2022.

== League business ==
=== Collective bargaining agreement and strike ===
The three-year agreement that was ratified between the CFL and CFL Player's Association expired just prior to this season, on May 15, which was the first day of scheduled training camp. After the CFL and CFLPA failed to come to an agreement before the deadline, players from seven of the nine teams formally went on strike on May 15, with players from the two teams in Alberta voting to strike on May 19 in accordance with provincial labour laws. This was the first CFL labour strike since 1974. On May 18, the CFL and CFLPA reached a tentative agreement on a new seven-year collective bargaining agreement (CBA). However, on May 23 the players voted against the tentative agreement, despite its approval by the bargaining committee and being recommended by team player reps. On May 26, the CFLPA and CFL agreed to a revised tentative CBA agreement. A few hours later the players voted to ratify the new collective bargaining agreement. The CFL Board of Governors officially ratified the agreement on May 31. Topics of negotiation include compensation, partially guaranteed contracts, revenue sharing, player safety, and league revenue generation following two seasons heavily impacted by the COVID-19 pandemic in Canada. However, much of the debate revolved around the Canadian-American player ratios.

The 2022 salary cap was $5,350,000 ($118,888 per active roster spot). Minimum salaries were $65,000 for National and American Players and $54,000 for Global Players. This was the last year minimum salaries were tiered (in 2023, the minimum rose to $70,000 for the entire league). Players also share $136,111 per club ratification bonus and $100,000 per club in community relations payments.

=== Schedule ===
The league released the season's full schedule on December 16, 2021, just four days after the 108th Grey Cup. The league returned to an 18-game schedule following a pandemic-shortened 2021 CFL season. The regular season began on June 9, with the Calgary Stampeders hosting the Montreal Alouettes. The Grey Cup rematch game between the Winnipeg Blue Bombers and Hamilton Tiger-Cats did not occur until week 3, which was the first time since 2018 that this game was not featured in week 1 of the regular season. Similar to the planned 2020 CFL season and the schedule from 2021, this year again featured more intra-divisional games, with BC, Calgary, and Edmonton playing 12 such games, Saskatchewan and Winnipeg playing 11 divisional games, and the East Division teams playing 10 divisional games. This was done to reduce cross-country travel.

The schedule featured all intra-divisional matchups in the last two weeks of the regular season. This year also featured more home-and-home matchups, with every team having at least two and Saskatchewan, Toronto, and Ottawa having five of these matchups. The Toronto Argonauts played a neutral site game on July 16 against the Saskatchewan Roughriders at Raymond Field, in Wolfville, Nova Scotia; with the stadium capacity increased from 3,000 to 10,000. It was the first CFL match held in Atlantic Canada since the 2019 season. All previous regular season games of the Touchdown Atlantic series were held in Moncton, New Brunswick. Tickets for the match sold out in less than one hour.

=== Rule changes ===
On April 27, the league announced a series of rule changes with the intention of improving game flow, and increasing offensive production.

- Narrowing of the field hashmarks from 28 yards from the sidelines instead of 24, making them nine yards apart instead of 17. This centralized the offence in the middle of the field, increasing the effective space the defence had to cover. It also aligned field goal kickers closer to the uprights so they did not have to kick on such drastic angles, which improved accuracy, and thus scoring.
- Increasing the no-yards penalties on punts from 5 yards to 15 yards. Previously special teams were willing to take a five-yard penalty to prevent a longer punt return.
- Changing the starting location of the offence. Kickoffs were moved back from the 35-yard line to the 30-yard line. After a field goal or a single rouge the team that was scored on could scrimmage from the 40-yard line instead of the 35-yard line. Both of these changes had the effect of the offence starting their drives closer to the opposition end-zone.
- Punting teams were also penalized for any ball that went out of bounds before the opponent’s 15-yard line, instead of the 20-yard line.
- A communications coordinator from the officiating department was on the sidelines of each team to enable faster communication between head coaches and on field officials.
- Expansion of the types of plays the Command Centre could review without requiring a coach’s challenge or an officials’ huddle (possession rulings, boundary rulings and administrative rules such as a formation without an end or ineligible receivers downfield)
- Teams were allowed to have two quarterbacks on the field at one time to allow creative plays.
- Penalties that occurred at the end of the first or third quarters could be applied to the start of the next quarter.
- Quarterbacks who fake giving themselves up were assessed an objectionable conduct penalty.
- Automatic ejection of any player for two unnecessary roughness or objectionable conduct penalties.

== Player movement ==
=== Free agency ===
The 2022 free agency period officially began on February 8 at 12:00 p.m. ET. Pending free agents and teams were able to negotiate offers for one week starting January 30 and ending February 6. All formal offers to a player during this time were sent to both the league and the players union and could not be rescinded.

== Regular season ==
=== Standings ===
West Division
Team	GP	W	L	T	Pts	PF	PA	Div	Stk	
Winnipeg Blue Bombers	18	15	3	0	30	538	370	10–1	W1	Details
BC Lions	18	12	6	0	24	525	405	8–4	L1	Details
Calgary Stampeders	18	12	6	0	24	533	373	7–5	W2	Details
Saskatchewan Roughriders	18	6	12	0	12	370	440	3–8	L7	Details
Edmonton Elks	18	4	14	0	8	354	599	1–11	L4	Details

East Division
Team	GP	W	L	T	Pts	PF	PA	Div	Stk	
Toronto Argonauts	18	11	7	0	22	443	415	7–3	L1	Details
Montreal Alouettes	18	9	9	0	18	471	466	5–5	W1	Details
Hamilton Tiger-Cats	18	8	10	0	16	421	473	5–5	W4	Details
Ottawa Redblacks	18	4	14	0	8	370	475	3–7	L3	Details

== Postseason ==
The Grey Cup was played at Mosaic Stadium in Regina, Saskatchewan, on November 20. The Toronto Argonauts won their league leading 18th Grey Cup and their first since the 2017 season.

=== Playoff bracket ===
November 6: Division Semi-Finals
East
E2	Montreal Alouettes	28
E3	Hamilton Tiger-Cats	17
West
W2	BC Lions	30
W3	Calgary Stampeders	16

November 13: Division Finals
E1	Toronto Argonauts	34
E2	Montreal Alouettes	27
W1	Winnipeg Blue Bombers	28
W2	BC Lions	20

November 20: 109th Grey Cup; Mosaic Stadium – Regina
E1	Toronto Argonauts	24
W1	Winnipeg Blue Bombers	23

== Broadcasting ==
The CFL continued to be broadcast on TSN and RDS across all platforms in Canada as part of their current contract. The broadcast rights were extended through 2025. The CFL entered a new partnership with Visaic providing streaming options for 130 countries and territories around the world. This service is available to anyone outside of Canada, the United Kingdom, Ireland, and the United States, where the rights are held by TSN, RDS, ESPN and BT Sports. Prices ranged from US$4.99 for a single game, to $99.99 for every regular season and playoff game.

== Award winners ==
=== CFL Top Performers of the Week ===
Week	First	Second	Third
One	Nathan Rourke	James Butler	T. J. Lee
Two	Titus Wall	Rene Paredes	Jamal Morrow
Three	Nathan Rourke	Malik Henry	Willie Jefferson
Four	Keon Hatcher	Anthony Lanier	Pete Robertson
Five	Zach Collaros	Peyton Logan	Dalton Schoen
Six	Greg Ellingson	Kenny Lawler	Dane Evans
Seven	Trevor Harris	Andrew Harris	Kurleigh Gittens Jr.
Eight	Nathan Rourke	Zach Collaros	Caleb Evans
Nine	Nathan Rourke	Dominique Rhymes	Titus Wall
Ten	Nathan Rourke	Bryan Burnham	Wesley Sutton
Eleven	Obum Gwacham	Trevor Harris	Tim White
Twelve	Jamal Peters	Kian Schaffer-Baker	Malik Henry
Thirteen	Jaelon Acklin	Lorenzo Mauldin	Jameer Thurman
Fourteen	Zach Collaros	Kurleigh Gittens Jr.	Willie Jefferson
Fifteen	Dane Evans	Taylor Cornelius	Matthew Thomas
Sixteen	Maurice Carnell	Jake Maier	McLeod Bethel-Thompson
Seventeen	Tyrice Beverette	Nic Demski	Zach Collaros
Eighteen	Dalton Schoen	Wes Hills	Malik Carney
Nineteen	Richard Leonard	Tim White	Adarius Pickett
Twenty	James Butler	Sean Thomas Erlington	Dedrick Mills
Twenty-one	Tommy Stevens	Dedrick Mills	Isaac Adeyemi-Berglund

=== CFL Top Performers of the Month ===
Month	First	Second	Third
June	Nathan Rourke	Jamal Morrow	Pete Robertson
July	Zach Collaros	Dalton Schoen	Jaelon Acklin
August	Nathan Rourke	Wynton McManis	Dominique Rhymes
September	Zach Collaros	Nic Demski	Jameer Thurman
October	Dalton Schoen	Trevor Harris	Richard Leonard

== 2022 CFL All-Stars ==
=== Offence ===
- QB – Zach Collaros, Winnipeg Blue Bombers
- RB – Ka'Deem Carey, Calgary Stampeders
- R – Dalton Schoen, Winnipeg Blue Bombers
- R – Eugene Lewis, Montreal Alouettes
- R – Dominique Rhymes, BC Lions
- R – Tim White, Hamilton Tiger-Cats
- R – Kurleigh Gittens Jr., Toronto Argonauts
- OT – Stanley Bryant, Winnipeg Blue Bombers
- OT – Derek Dennis, Calgary Stampeders
- OG – Brandon Revenberg, Hamilton Tiger-Cats
- OG – Patrick Neufeld, Winnipeg Blue Bombers
- C – Sean McEwen, Calgary Stampeders

=== Defence ===
- DT – Mike Rose, Calgary Stampeders
- DT – Jake Ceresna, Edmonton Elks
- DE – Lorenzo Mauldin IV, Ottawa Redblacks
- DE – Shawn Lemon, Calgary Stampeders
- LB – Wynton McManis, Toronto Argonauts
- LB – Cameron Judge, Calgary Stampeders
- CLB – Kameron Kelly, Hamilton Tiger-Cats
- CB – Jamal Peters, Toronto Argonauts
- CB – Garry Peters, BC Lions
- HB – Marcus Sayles, BC Lions
- HB – Deatrick Nichols, Winnipeg Blue Bombers
- S – Loucheiz Purifoy, BC Lions

=== Special teams ===
- K – Rene Paredes, Calgary Stampeders
- P – Cody Grace, Calgary Stampeders
- ST – Janarion Grant, Winnipeg Blue Bombers

== 2022 CFL Western All-Stars ==
=== Offence ===
- QB – Zach Collaros, Winnipeg Blue Bombers
- RB – Ka'Deem Carey, Calgary Stampeders
- R – Dalton Schoen, Winnipeg Blue Bombers
- R – Dominique Rhymes, BC Lions
- R – Nic Demski, Winnipeg Blue Bombers
- R – Malik Henry, Calgary Stampeders
- R – Kenny Lawler, Edmonton Elks
- OT – Stanley Bryant, Winnipeg Blue Bombers
- OT – Derek Dennis, Calgary Stampeders
- OG – Patrick Neufeld, Winnipeg Blue Bombers
- OG – Ryan Sceviour, Calgary Stampeders
- C – Sean McEwen, Calgary Stampeders

=== Defence ===
- DT – Jake Ceresna, Edmonton Elks
- DT – Mike Rose, Calgary Stampeders
- DE – Willie Jefferson, Winnipeg Blue Bombers
- DE – Shawn Lemon, Calgary Stampeders
- LB – Adam Bighill, Winnipeg Blue Bombers
- LB – Cameron Judge, Calgary Stampeders
- CLB – Derrick Moncrief, Saskatchewan Roughriders
- CB – Garry Peters, BC Lions
- CB – Jonathan Moxey, Calgary Stampeders
- HB – Marcus Sayles, BC Lions
- HB – Deatrick Nichols, Winnipeg Blue Bombers
- S – Loucheiz Purifoy, BC Lions

=== Special teams ===
- K – Rene Paredes, Calgary Stampeders
- P – Cody Grace, Calgary Stampeders
- ST – Janarion Grant, Winnipeg Blue Bombers

== 2022 CFL Eastern All-Stars ==
=== Offence ===
- QB – McLeod Bethel-Thompson, Toronto Argonauts
- RB – A.J. Ouellette, Toronto Argonauts
- R – Eugene Lewis, Montreal Alouettes
- R – Kurleigh Gittens Jr., Toronto Argonauts
- R – Jaelon Acklin, Ottawa Redblacks
- R – Tim White, Hamilton Tiger-Cats
- R – Steven Dunbar Jr., Hamilton Tiger-Cats
- OT – Dejon Allen, Toronto Argonauts
- OT – Landon Rice, Montreal Alouettes
- OG – Brandon Revenberg, Hamilton Tiger-Cats
- OG – Jacob Ruby, Ottawa Redblacks
- C – Justin Lawrence, Toronto Argonauts

=== Defence ===
- DT – Micah Johnson, Hamilton Tiger-Cats
- DT – Shawn Oakman, Toronto Argonauts
- DE – Lorenzo Mauldin IV, Ottawa Redblacks
- DE – Julian Howsare, Hamilton Tiger-Cats
- LB – Wynton McManis, Toronto Argonauts
- LB – Jovan Santos-Knox, Hamilton Tiger-Cats
- CLB – Kameron Kelly, Hamilton Tiger-Cats
- CB – Jamal Peters, Toronto Argonauts
- CB – Jumal Rolle, Hamilton Tiger-Cats
- HB – Richard Leonard, Hamilton Tiger-Cats
- HB – Wesley Sutton, Montreal Alouettes
- S – Tunde Adeleke, Hamilton Tiger-Cats

=== Special teams ===
- K – Seth Small, Hamilton Tiger-Cats
- P – John Haggerty, Toronto Argonauts
- ST – Chandler Worthy, Montreal Alouettes

== 2022 CFL awards ==
- CFL's Most Outstanding Player Award – Zach Collaros (QB), Winnipeg Blue Bombers
- CFL's Most Outstanding Canadian Award – Nathan Rourke (QB), BC Lions
- CFL's Most Outstanding Defensive Player Award – Lorenzo Mauldin IV (DL), Ottawa Redblacks
- CFL's Most Outstanding Offensive Lineman Award – Stanley Bryant (OT), Winnipeg Blue Bombers
- CFL's Most Outstanding Rookie Award – Dalton Schoen (WR), Winnipeg Blue Bombers
- John Agro Special Teams Award – Mario Alford (KR), Saskatchewan Roughriders
- Tom Pate Memorial Award – Emmanuel Arceneaux (WR), Edmonton Elks
- Jake Gaudaur Veterans' Trophy – Dan Clark (OL), Saskatchewan Roughriders
- Annis Stukus Trophy – Mike O'Shea, Winnipeg Blue Bombers
- Commissioner's Award – Jeff Harbin, long time CFL official
- Hugh Campbell Distinguished Leadership Award – Rick LeLacheur, BC Lions president and CEO
- Jane Mawby Tribute Award - Gail Mund, Saskatchewan Roughriders director of ticket operations
