= 2024 CFL season =

Canadian Football League season

- Duration: June 6 – October 26, 2024
- East champions: Toronto Argonauts
- West champions: Winnipeg Blue Bombers

111th Grey Cup
- Date: November 17, 2024
- Venue: BC Place, Vancouver
- Champions: Toronto Argonauts

CFL seasons
- ← 2023 2025 →

Locations of the active CFL teams West East

The 2024 CFL season was the 70th season of modern professional Canadian football. Officially, it was the 66th season of the Canadian Football League. Vancouver hosted the 111th Grey Cup on November 17, 2024. The regular season started on June 6 and ended on October 26, with 18 games played per team over 21 weeks.

== CFL news in 2024 ==
=== Salary cap ===
According to the new collective bargaining agreement, the 2024 salary cap was at least $5,525,000 (or $124,111 per active roster spot) plus an unlimited non-football-related services (marketing fund) with a minimum spend of $110,000 per club. With the unlimited marketing fund, most teams spent $12–14 million on football operations in 2023 with the majority of that on player costs. This was the first league year that players began to receive revenue sharing, which was set at 25% this season (or a cap increase of 2.78% for every dollar increase). The salary cap is announced in late April every year as well as fines/luxury tax from the previous season. On April 19, 2024, the league announced that Hamilton, Winnipeg and BC paid luxury tax for exceeding the cap in 2023, but not by more than $100,000, which would have resulted in the loss of draft selections. As was the case in 2023, the minimum player salary was set at $70,000.

=== Draft changes ===
Beginning this season, the two teams that had National players play the most snaps from the previous season received additional second-round draft picks in this year's draft.

=== Scheduling ===
During his commissioner's state of the league address on November 14, 2023, Randy Ambrosie confirmed that the 2024 schedule would return to a more balanced format instead of focusing on interdivisional match ups. In an 18-game schedule, western teams played 12 divisional and six interdivisional games and eastern teams played 10 divisional and eight interdivisional games in 2022 and 2023, but returned to playing at least two games with every opponent resulting in western teams playing 10 divisional and eight interdivisional games and eastern teams playing eight divisional and 10 interdivisional games. This was confirmed with the schedule release on December 14, 2023.

=== Touchdown Pacific ===
On November 29, 2023, the league announced that the BC Lions would be the host team for a neutral site game to be played at Royal Athletic Park in Victoria on August 31, 2024, against the Ottawa Redblacks.

== Player movement ==
=== Free agency ===
The 2024 free agency period began on February 13 at noon EST. Pending free agents and teams were able to negotiate offers for one week starting Sunday, February 4, 2024, and ending Sunday, February 11, 2024. All formal offers to a player during this time were sent to both the league and the players union and could not be rescinded.

=== Trade deadline ===
The in-season trade deadline was on October 2 at 5 pm EDT.

== Regular season ==
=== Standings ===
West Division
Team	GP	W	L	T	Pts	PF	PA	Div	Stk	
Winnipeg Blue Bombers	18	11	7	0	22	447	365	7–3	W1	Details
Saskatchewan Roughriders	18	9	8	1	19	478	434	5–5	L1	Details
BC Lions	18	9	9	0	18	448	439	5–5	W1	Details
Edmonton Elks	18	7	11	0	14	494	500	5–5	W2	Details
Calgary Stampeders	18	5	12	1	11	427	510	3–7	W1	Details

East Division
Team	GP	W	L	T	Pts	PF	PA	Div	Stk	
Montreal Alouettes	18	12	5	1	25	455	404	6–2	L2	Details
Toronto Argonauts	18	10	8	0	20	513	479	3–5	L1	Details
Ottawa Redblacks	18	9	8	1	19	443	488	3–5	W1	Details
Hamilton Tiger-Cats	18	7	11	0	14	495	557	4–4	L1	Details

== Postseason ==
=== Playoff bracket ===
November 2: Division Semi-Finals
East
E2	Toronto Argonauts	58
E3	Ottawa Redblacks	38
West
W2	Saskatchewan Roughriders	28
W3	BC Lions	19

November 9: Division Finals
E1	Montreal Alouettes	28
E2	Toronto Argonauts	30
W1	Winnipeg Blue Bombers	38
W2	Saskatchewan Roughriders	22

November 17: 111th Grey Cup; BC Place – Vancouver
E2	Toronto Argonauts	41
W1	Winnipeg Blue Bombers	24

== Attendance ==
Ranked from highest to lowest average home attendance.

Regular season
No.	Team	Home games	Total attendance	Average attendance
1	Winnipeg Blue Bombers	9	280,491	31,165
2	Saskatchewan Roughriders	9	249,164	27,684
3	BC Lions	9	241,947	26,883
4	Hamilton Tiger-Cats	9	198,012	22,001
5	Calgary Stampeders	9	193,869	21,541
6	Montreal Alouettes	9	191,718	21,302
7	Edmonton Elks	9	184,494	20,499
8	Ottawa Redblacks	9	169,323	18,813
9	Toronto Argonauts	9	136,162	15,129

== Broadcasting ==
The CFL continued to be broadcast on TSN and RDS across all platforms in Canada as part of their current contract. The broadcast rights were extended through 2025. In June, Bell Media announced that CTV would broadcast TSN-produced CFL coverage on digital terrestrial television, including a late-season package of exclusive 3 p.m. ET games beginning on September 7, continuing with playoff coverage of the East Division, and concluding with a simulcast of the 111th Grey Cup; returning the CFL to over-the-air television for the first time since 2007.

Broadcast rights for the CFL in the United States remained with CBS Sports Network (CBSSN) following their acquisition of the rights during the 2023 season. CBSSN's package consisted mostly of Saturday and Sunday contests during June and July, a majority of August games, and the Labour Day and Thanksgiving Day Classics.

The league continued the use of its own streaming platform, CFL+, to stream the TSN broadcast to US audiences (when CBSSN is not broadcasting a game) and international audiences (all games) at no cost. The CFL also expanded on its functionality, allowing video on demand replay for up to 48 hours after the game and used CFL+ to broadcast most of the preseason using in-stadium video feeds and local radio play-by-play commentary.

== Award winners ==
=== CFL Honour Roll ===
Weekly Honour Roll
Week	Quarterback	Running back	Receiver	Offensive lineman	Defensive lineman	Linebacker	Defensive back	Returner	Kicker/Punter	Special teams	Offensive line
1	Jake Maier	James Butler	Tyler Snead	Brandon Revenberg	Jared Brinkman	Wynton McManis	Rolan Milligan	Mario Alford	René Paredes	Kelon Thomas	Hamilton Tiger-Cats
2	Vernon Adams	Ryquell Armstead	Jalen Philpot	Dariusz Bladek	Anthony Lanier II	Jameer Thurman	Tyrell Ford	DeVonte Dedmon	Brett Lauther	Rolan Milligan	Montreal Alouettes
3	McLeod Bethel-Thompson	Ka'Deem Carey	Alexander Hollins	Dejon Allen	Casey Sayles	Tyrice Beverette	Jamal Peters	DeVonte Dedmon	Nik Constantinou	Tyron Vrede	Toronto Argonauts
4	Vernon Adams	Ryquell Armstead	Jevon Cottoy	Nick Callender	Trevon Mason	D.Q. Thomas	Jonathan Edouard	Tobias Harris	Sergio Castillo	Adarius Pickett	Edmonton Elks
5	Vernon Adams	Brady Oliveira	Justin McInnis	Nick Callender	Casey Sayles	Kyrie Wilson	Rolan Milligan	Janarion Grant	Sergio Castillo	Kabion Ento	Montreal Alouettes
6	Vernon Adams	Ka'Deem Carey	Ontaria Wilson	Logan Ferland	Jordan Williams	Wynton McManis	Adarius Pickett	Janarion Grant	Sean Whyte	Thiadric Hansen	Winnipeg Blue Bombers
7	Shea Patterson	William Stanback	Ajou Ajou	Jacob Brammer	DeWayne Hendrix	Micah Awe	Kobe Williams	Terry Williams	Nik Constantinou	Tyson Hergott	Saskatchewan Roughriders
8	Davis Alexander	Ka'Deem Carey	Bralon Addison	Isiah Cage	Bryce Carter	Adam Bighill	Marc-Antoine Dequoy	Kalil Pimpleton	Lewis Ward	Tyrice Beverette	Hamilton Tiger-Cats
9	Shea Patterson	Brady Oliveira	Marken Michel	Shane Richards	Willie Jefferson	Adam Bighill	Royce Metchie	Mario Alford	Sergio Castillo	Mario Alford	Hamilton Tiger-Cats
10	Taylor Powell	William Stanback	Tevin Jones	Martez Ivey	Shawn Oakman	Darnell Sankey	DaShaun Amos	Terry Williams	Brett Lauther	Kerfalla Exumé	Toronto Argonauts
11	Trevor Harris	Justin Rankin	Nic Demski	Jarell Broxton	Mustafa Johnson	Jameer Thurman	Tyrell Ford	James Letcher	Lewis Ward	Jordan Perryman	Winnipeg Blue Bombers
12	Dru Brown	Brady Oliveira	Tim White	Gabe Wallace	Christian Covington	Frankie Griffin	Benjie Franklin	DeVonte Dedmon	Lirim Hajrullahu	Tony Jones	Edmonton Elks
13	McLeod Bethel-Thompson	Greg Bell	Kurleigh Gittens Jr.	Coulter Woodmansey	Malik Carney	Micah Awe	Damon Webb	DeVonte Dedmon	Marc Liegghio	Justin Herdman-Reed	Saskatchewan Roughriders
14	Nathan Rourke	David Mackie	Reggie Begelton	Martez Ivey	Mike Rose	Cameron Judge	Kordell Jackson	Jamal Morrow	Jake Julien	Gary Johnson	Edmonton Elks
15	Chad Kelly	Greg Bell	Steven Dunbar	Brandon Revenberg	Nick Usher	Cameron Judge	Jonathan Moxey	Janarion Grant	José Maltos	Patrice René	Hamilton Tiger-Cats
16	Trevor Harris	Ryquell Armstead	Kian Schaffer-Baker	Trevon Tate	Mustafa Johnson	Jameer Thurman	Tarvarus McFadden	Mario Alford	Marc Liegghio	Jacob Roberts	Saskatchewan Roughriders
17	Zach Collaros	William Stanback	Kenny Lawler	Nick Callender	Shawn Oakman	Tyron Vrede	Rolan Milligan	James Letcher	Nik Constantinou	Fabian Weitz	Hamilton Tiger-Cats
18	Nathan Rourke	Brady Oliveira	Nic Demski	Liam Dobson	Bryan Cox Jr.	Redha Kramdi	Deatrick Nichols	Loucheiz Purifoy	Jake Julien	Trevor Hoyte	Winnipeg Blue Bombers
19	Chad Kelly	Justin Rankin	Jerreth Sterns	David Foucault	Jake Ceresna	Wynton McManis	Loucheiz Purifoy	Terry Williams	Cody Grace	Brian Cole II	Montreal Alouettes
20	Chad Kelly	Jeshrun Antwi	Dejon Brissett	David Beard	Ralph Holley	Carthell Flowers-Lloyd	Cristophe Beaulieu	Kalil Pimpleton	Joseph Zema	Benjie Franklin	Hamilton Tiger-Cats
21	Nick Arbuckle	Deonta McMahon	Makai Polk	Brett Boyko	Jordan Domineck	Tony Jones	Damon Webb	Isaiah Wooden	Sergio Castillo	Isaac Darkangelo	Montreal Alouettes

Monthly Honour Roll
Month	Quarterback	Running back	Receiver	Offensive lineman	Defensive lineman	Linebacker	Defensive back	Returner	Kicker/Punter	Special teams	Offensive line
June	Vernon Adams	Ka'Deem Carey	Alexander Hollins	Isiah Cage	Jared Brinkman	Jameer Thurman	Nafees Lyon	DeVonte Dedmon	René Paredes	Rolan Milligan	Toronto Argonauts
July	Vernon Adams	Brady Oliveira	Justin McInnis	Logan Ferland	Casey Sayles	Wynton McManis	Marc-Antoine Dequoy	Kalil Pimpleton	Lewis Ward	Tyrice Beverette	Montreal Alouettes
August	Trevor Harris	Brady Oliveira	Tevin Jones	Martez Ivey	Ralph Holley	Frankie Griffin	Tyrell Ford	Deonta McMahon	Sergio Castillo	David Mackie	Edmonton Elks
September	Trevor Harris	Brady Oliveira	Jevoni Robinson	Martez Ivey	Casey Sayles	Nick Anderson	Marcus Sayles	James Letcher	Lirim Hajrullahu	Tyrell Richards	Hamilton Tiger-Cats
October	Chad Kelly	Brady Oliveira	Makai Polk	Brett Boyko	Shawn Oakman	Tony Jones	Loucheiz Purifoy	James Letcher	Brett Lauther	Brian Cole II	Montreal Alouettes

=== Pro Football Focus ===
Team of the Week
Week	Offence			Defence			Special teams
Week	Backfield	Receivers	Linemen	Primary	Secondary	Backfield	Special teams
1	QB Maier (CGY); RB Butler (HAM)	Outside T. Philpot (MTL); Slot Hollins (BC); Slot Schoen (WPG); Slot McInnis (BC); Outside Bane Jr. (SSK)	LT Cage (TOR); LG Revenberg (HAM); C Lawrence (MTL); RG MacKellar (TOR); RT Steward (EDM)	Edge Ceresna (TOR); Interior Brinkman (TOR); Interior Mus. Johnson (MTL); Edge Orimolade (TOR)	CB Gray (EDM); HB Milligan (SSK); LB McManis (TOR); LB Morgan (EDM); Cover LB Cole II (WPG); HB K. Williams (CGY); CB N. Lokombo (SSK)	S Dalke (SSK)	K Paredes (CGY); P Julien (EDM); Returner Alford (SSK)
2	QB Adams (BC); RB Armstead (OTT)	Outside Hollins (BC); Slot J. Philpot (CGY); Slot Hardy (OTT); Slot Sterns (SSK); Outside Bridges (HAM)	LT Ivey (EDM); LG Lestage (MTL); C Godber (SSK); RG Bladek (OTT); RT Hardrick (SSK)	Edge Mauldin IV (OTT); Interior Lanier II (SSK); Interior Debaillie (BC); Edge Carney (SSK)	CB Ford (WPG); HB Webb (OTT); LB Thurman (SSK); LB Awe (CGY); Cover LB Pickett (OTT); HB Milligan (SSK); CB Lyon (MTL)	S L. Purifoy (EDM)	K Lauther (SSK); P Zema (MTL); Returner Dedmon (OTT)
3	QB Bethel-Thompson (EDM); RB Carey (TOR)	Outside Hollins (BC); Slot Demski (WPG); Slot McInnis (BC); Slot Hardy (OTT); Outside T. Philpot (MTL)	LT Cage (TOR); LG Lestage (MTL); C Lawrence (MTL); RG Woodmansey (HAM); RT Allen (TOR)	Edge Smith (TOR); Interior C. Sayles (HAM); Interior Brinkman (TOR); Edge Carney (SSK)	CB J. Peters (HAM); HB Ruffin (MTL); LB Beverette (MTL); LB Woods (BC); Cover LB Pickett (OTT); HB Bratton (EDM); CB M. Sayles (SSK)	S Katsantonis (HAM)	K Côté (MTL); P Constantinou (HAM); Returner Dedmon (OTT)
4	QB Adams (BC); RB Armstead (OTT)	Outside Acklin (OTT); Slot Spieker (MTL); Slot A. Smith (EDM); Slot Michel (CGY); Outside Mitchell (EDM)	LT Demery (CGY); LG Lestage (MTL); C Packer (BC); RG MacKellar (TOR); RT Pelehos (OTT)	Edge Vaughters (CGY); Interior Mason (HAM); Interior C. Sayles (HAM); Edge Smith (TOR)	CB G. Peters (BC); HB K. Williams (CGY); LB Thomas (HAM); LB McManis (TOR); Cover LB Pickett (OTT); HB Bratton (EDM); CB R. Leonard (HAM)	S Katsantonis (HAM)	K Paredes (CGY); P Julien (EDM); Returner C. Smith (WPG)
5	QB Adams (BC); RB Oliveira (WPG)	Outside Hollins (BC); Slot McInnis (BC); Slot Bailey (TOR); Slot Emilus (SSK); Outside T. Philpot (MTL)	LT Callender (MTL); LG Lestage (MTL); C Lawrence (MTL); RG Ferland (SSK); RT Allen (TOR)	Edge Jefferson (WPG); Interior C. Sayles (HAM); Interior Banks (BC); Edge Robertson (BC)	CB Ford (WPG); HB Milligan (SSK); LB Wilson (WPG); LB Hoyte (HAM); Cover LB René (BC); HB Ruffin (MTL); CB Roberson (CGY)	S Dequoy (MTL)	K Castillo (WPG); P Constantinou (HAM); Returner Grant (TOR)
6	None awarded						
7	QB Patterson (SSK); RB Carey (TOR)	Outside Lewis (EDM); Slot Ajou (SSK); Slot Schaffer-Baker (SSK); Slot Bailey (TOR); Outside Coxie (TOR)	LT Bordner (HAM); LG Revenberg (HAM); C Nicastro (TOR); RG Bladek (OTT); RT Brammer (SSK)	Edge Carney (SSK); Interior Hendrix (HAM); Interior Rose (CGY); Edge Taylor (EDM)	CB Richardson (CGY); HB K. Williams (CGY); LB Awe (CGY); LB Hladik (BC); Cover LB Kramdi (WPG); HB Milligan (SSK); CB M. Sayles (SSK)	S L. Purifoy (EDM)	K Castillo (WPG); P Constantinou (HAM); Returner Grant (TOR)
8	QB Alexander (MTL); RB Hickson (SSK)	Outside Wilson (WPG); Slot K. Smith (HAM); Slot Johnson (SSK); Slot Gittens Jr. (EDM); Outside Bridges (HAM)	LT Cage (TOR); LG Lestage (MTL); C McEwen (CGY); RG Bladek (OTT); RT Lofton (WPG)	Edge Carter (OTT); Interior C. Sayles (HAM); Interior Holley (TOR); Edge Mauldin IV (OTT)	CB McFadden (TOR); HB M. Griffin II (WPG); LB Bighill (WPG); LB Anderson (EDM); Cover LB Priester (TOR); HB Moxey (HAM); CB Bonds (WPG)	S Dequoy (MTL)	K Ward (OTT); P Julien (EDM); Returner Pimpleton (OTT)
9	QB Patterson (SSK); RB Oliveira (WPG)	Outside Rambo (MTL); Slot Jones (EDM); Slot Johnson (SSK); Slot Michel (CGY); Outside Wilson (WPG)	LT Bryant (WPG); LG Lestage (MTL); C Kolankowski (WPG); RG Richards (EDM); RT Murray (HAM)	Edge Jefferson (WPG); Interior Rose (CGY); Interior Holley (TOR); Edge Garbutt (WPG)	CB Ford (WPG); HB George Jr. (HAM); LB Bighill (WPG); LB Auclair (SSK); Cover LB Reavis (SSK); HB Murray (MTL); CB Roberson (CGY)	S R. Metchie (TOR)	K Castillo (WPG); P Flintoft (BC); Returner Alford (SSK)
10	QB Powell (HAM); RB Carey (TOR)	Outside Rambo (MTL); Slot Jones (EDM); Slot Gittens Jr. (EDM); Slot Begelton (CGY); Outside Myers (SSK)	LT Ivey (EDM); LG Lestage (MTL); C Nicastro (TOR); RG Nkanu (CGY); RT Boyko (EDM)	Edge Carney (SSK); Interior Oakman (EDM); Interior Laing (OTT); Edge Carter (OTT)	CB M. Sayles (SSK); HB Amos (TOR); LB Sankey (MTL); LB Awe (CGY); Cover LB Dozier (CGY); HB Milligan (SSK); CB R. Leonard (HAM)	S Addae (OTT)	K Lauther (SSK); P Leone (OTT); Returner Grant (TOR)
11	QB Harris (SSK); RB Rankin (EDM)	Outside Lewis (EDM); Slot Demski (WPG); Slot Begelton (CGY); Slot Johnson (SSK); Outside Acklin (OTT)	LT Broxton (BC); LG Desjarlais (OTT); C Beard (HAM); RG Bladek (OTT); RT Ferland (SSK)	Edge Carney (SSK); Interior Mus. Johnson (MTL); Interior Micah Johnson (SSK); Edge Jefferson (WPG)	CB Ford (WPG); HB Nichols (WPG); LB Bighill (WPG); LB Thurman (SSK); Cover LB Dozier (CGY); HB Lee (BC); CB Ento (MTL)	S L. Purifoy (EDM)	K Ward (OTT); P Julien (EDM); Returner Letcher (MTL)
12	QB Brown (OTT); RB Oliveira (WPG)	Outside Mardner (OTT); Slot White (HAM); Slot Hardy (OTT); Slot McInnis (BC); Outside Rambo (MTL)	LT Ivey (EDM); LG Revenberg (HAM); C Lawrence (MTL); RG Richards (EDM); RT Pelehos (OTT)	Edge Cox Jr. (SSK); Interior Holley (TOR); Interior Wakefield (OTT); Edge Barlow (HAM)	CB Franklin (TOR); HB R. Leonard (HAM); LB F. Griffin (OTT); LB Beverette (MTL); Cover LB O'Neal (EDM); HB Fields (SSK); CB Ento (MTL)	S R. Metchie (TOR)	K Hajrullahu (TOR); P Julien (EDM); Returner Cobb (EDM)
13	QB Bethel-Thompson (EDM); RB Bell (HAM)	Outside Myers (SSK); Slot Jones (EDM); Slot Gittens Jr. (EDM); Slot Begelton (CGY); Slot White (HAM)	LT Ivey (EDM); LG Revenberg (HAM); C Korte (EDM); RG Ferland (SSK); RT Coker (CGY)	Edge Carney (SSK); Interior Curtis (EDM); Interior Wakefield (OTT); Edge Orimolade (TOR)	CB M. Sayles (SSK); HB Webb (OTT); LB Awe (CGY); LB Jones (WPG); Cover LB Reavis (SSK); HB R. Leonard (HAM); CB Bynum (EDM)	S Alexander (WPG)	K Castillo (WPG); P Julien (EDM); Returner Logan (CGY)
14	QB Brown (OTT); RB Stanback (BC)	Outside Lewis (EDM); Slot Begelton (CGY); Slot Schaffer-Baker (SSK); Slot Lawler (WPG); Outside Ungerer III (TOR)	LT Ivey (EDM); LG Desjarlais (OTT); C Korte (EDM); RG Jones (SSK); RT Perkins (BC)	Edge Jefferson (WPG); Interior Rose (CGY); Interior Tavai (BC); Edge Betts (BC)	CB Ford (WPG); HB Jackson (EDM); LB Judge (CGY); LB Awe (CGY); Cover LB Dozier (CGY); HB Webb (OTT); CB M. Sayles (SSK)	S L. Purifoy (EDM)	K Ward (OTT); P Julien (EDM); Returner Grant (TOR)
15	QB Kelly (TOR); RB Bell (HAM)	Outside Dunbar (HAM); Slot Polk (TOR); Slot Hardy (OTT); Slot Julien-Grant (MTL); Outside Rhymes (OTT)	LT Bordner (HAM); LG Revenberg (HAM); C Beard (HAM); RG Bladek (OTT); RT Coker (CGY)	Edge Barlow (HAM); Interior Holley (TOR); Interior Mus. Johnson (MTL); Edge Smith (TOR)	CB McGhee (OTT); HB Ruffin (MTL); LB Usher (HAM); LB B. Lokombo (BC); Cover LB Moxey (HAM); HB R. Leonard (HAM); CB Ento (MTL)	S R. Metchie (TOR)	K Maltos (MTL); P Flintoft (BC); Returner Grant (TOR)
16	QB Harris (SSK); RB Armstead (SSK)	Outside Johnson (SSK); Slot Schaffer-Baker (SSK); Slot Hardy (OTT); Slot Daniels (TOR); Outside Wilson (WPG)	LT Reid (SSK); LG Foucault (EDM); C McEwen (CGY); RG Jones (SSK); RT Tate (SSK)	Edge Orimolade (TOR); Interior Mus. Johnson (MTL); Interior Hendrix (HAM); Edge Haba (WPG)	CB McFadden (TOR); HB Webb (OTT); LB Thurman (SSK); LB Anderson (EDM); Cover LB Moncrief (EDM); HB Holm (WPG); CB D. Williams (SSK)	S Addae (OTT)	K Liegghio (HAM); P Julien (EDM); Returner Alford (SSK)
17	QB Collaros (WPG); RB Stanback (BC)	REC Lawler (WPG); REC Spieker (MTL); REC Hardy (OTT); REC Demski (WPG); REC Cottoy (BC)	LT Callender (MTL); LG Lestage (MTL); C Kolankowski (WPG); RG Woodmansey (HAM); RT Tate (SSK)	Edge Garbutt (WPG); Interior Oakman (EDM); Interior Hendrix (HAM); Edge A.C. Leonard (EDM)	CB McFadden (TOR); HB Milligan (SSK); LB Anderson (EDM); LB Taylor (OTT); Cover LB Adeleke (TOR); HB Milton (TOR); CB Ento (MTL)	S N. Lokombo (SSK)	K Lauther (SSK); P Constantinou (HAM); Returner Letcher (MTL)
18	QB Rourke (BC); RB Oliveira (WPG)	REC Demski (WPG); REC Johnson (SSK); REC Emilus (SSK); REC Mathis (EDM); REC Gittens Jr. (EDM)	LT Bryant (WPG); LG Dobson (WPG); C Kolankowski (WPG); RG Jones (SSK); RT Coker (CGY)	Edge Cox Jr. (SSK); Interior Oakman (EDM); Interior Rose (CGY); Edge E. Brown (EDM)	CB Roberson (CGY); HB Nichols (WPG); LB Anderson (EDM); LB Auclair (SSK); Cover LB Kramdi (WPG); HB Milligan (SSK); CB Edwards-Cooper (BC)	S L. Purifoy (EDM)	K Whyte (BC); P Julien (EDM); Returner Alford (SSK)
19	QB Kelly (TOR); RB Rankin (EDM)	REC Sterns (SSK); REC McInnis (BC); REC Emilus (SSK); REC Lawler (WPG); REC Polk (TOR)	LT Demery (CGY); LG Foucault (EDM); C Nicastro (TOR); RG Neufeld (WPG); RT Coker (CGY)	Edge Onyeka (OTT); Interior Ceresna (TOR); Interior M. Brown (SSK); Edge Garbutt (WPG)	CB M. Sayles (SSK); HB Webb (OTT); LB McManis (TOR); LB Jones (WPG); Cover LB Adeleke (TOR); HB Murray (MTL); CB Dandridge (OTT)	S L. Purifoy (EDM)	K Lauther (SSK); P Grace (CGY); Returner Williams (BC)
20	QB Adams (BC); RB Bell (HAM)	REC Brissett (TOR); REC Coxie (TOR); REC Dunbar (HAM); REC Hardy (OTT); REC Hatcher (BC)	LT Hunter (TOR); LG Revenberg (HAM); C Beard (HAM); RG Nkanu (CGY); RT McGloster (MTL)	Edge Vaughters (CGY); Interior Holley (TOR); Interior Mason (HAM); Edge Betts (BC)	CB Roberson (CGY); HB Kent (BC); LB Richards (MTL); LB Beverette (MTL); Cover LB Flowers-Lloyd (HAM); HB R. Leonard (HAM); CB Franklin (TOR)	S Beaulieu (BC)	K Hajrullahu (TOR); P Zema (MTL); Returner Pimpleton (OTT)
21	QB Arbuckle (TOR); RB Leake (EDM)	REC Polk (TOR); REC Snead (MTL); REC Dunbar (HAM); REC Demski (WPG); REC Pimpleton (OTT)	LT Steward (EDM); LG Lestage (MTL); C Lawrence (MTL); RG Woodmansey (HAM); RT Boyko (EDM)	Edge Domineck (MTL); Interior Hendrix (HAM); Interior Pelley (EDM); Edge Garbutt (WPG)	CB M. Sayles (SSK); HB Jackson (EDM); LB Jones (WPG); LB Wilborn (HAM); Cover LB Reavis (SSK); HB George Jr. (TOR); CB Ford (WPG)	S Sanders (CGY)	K Castillo (WPG); P Julien (EDM); Returner Wooden (HAM)

Players of the Week
Week	Quarterback	Offensive Player	Offensive Line	Pass-Rusher	Run Defender	Coverage Player
1	Jake Maier	James Butler	Montreal Alouettes	Jake Ceresna	Jared Brinkman	Brian Cole II
2	Vernon Adams	Ryquell Armstead	Montreal Alouettes	Lorenzo Mauldin IV	C.J. Reavis	Tyrell Ford
3	McLeod Bethel-Thompson	Alexander Hollins	Toronto Argonauts	Malik Carney	Josh Woods	Jamal Peters
4	Vernon Adams	Cole Spieker	Toronto Argonauts	Casey Sayles	Adam Bighill	Richard Leonard
5	Vernon Adams	Brady Oliveira	Montreal Alouettes	Casey Sayles	Wynton McManis	Rolan Milligan
6	None awarded					
7	Shea Patterson	Ajou Ajou	Saskatchewan Roughriders	DeWayne Hendrix	Kyrie Wilson	Rolan Milligan
8	Davis Alexander	Frankie Hickson	Hamilton Tiger-Cats	Bryce Carter	Nick Anderson	Tarvarus McFadden
9	Shea Patterson	Brady Oliveira	Edmonton Elks	Willie Jefferson	Ralph Holley	Tyrell Ford
10	Taylor Powell	Tevin Jones	Toronto Argonauts	Cleyon Laing	Ralph Holley	Rolan Milligan
11	Trevor Harris	Justin Rankin	Winnipeg Blue Bombers	Malik Carney	Lorenzo Mauldin IV	Tyrell Ford
12	Dru Brown	Tim White	Edmonton Elks	Ralph Holley	Ryder Varga	Richard Leonard
13	McLeod Bethel-Thompson	Tevin Jones	Toronto Argonauts	Malik Carney	Lorenzo Mauldin IV	Marcus Sayles
14	Dru Brown	Reggie Begelton	Toronto Argonauts	Charles Wiley	Branden Dozier	Tyrell Ford
15	Chad Kelly	Steven Dunbar	Hamilton Tiger-Cats	Brandon Barlow	Mustafa Johnson	Jonathan Moxey
16	Trevor Harris	Ryquell Armstead	Saskatchewan Roughriders	Folarin Orimolade	Nick Anderson	Geoffrey Cantin-Arku
17	Zach Collaros	Kenny Lawler	Hamilton Tiger-Cats	DeWayne Hendrix	Shawn Oakman	Rolan Milligan
18	Nathan Rourke	Brady Oliveira	Winnipeg Blue Bombers	Shawn Oakman	Nick Anderson	Deatrick Nichols
19	Chad Kelly	Justin Rankin	Ottawa Redblacks	Jake Ceresna	Tony Jones	Loucheiz Purifoy
20	Vernon Adams	Bo Levi Mitchell	Hamilton Tiger-Cats	James Vaughters	Ben Hladik	Cristophe Beaulieu
21	Nick Arbuckle	Javon Leake	Montreal Alouettes	Julian Howsare	Tony Jones	Kenneth George Jr.

PFF 2024 CFL midseason awards
Award	Winner	Honourable Mentions
Most Outstanding Player	Vernon Adams (BC Lions)	Cody Fajardo (Montreal Alouettes); Ka'Deem Carey (Toronto Argonauts); Trevor Harris (Saskatchewan Roughriders)
Most Outstanding Rookie	Ontaria Wilson (Winnipeg Blue Bombers)	Ralph Holley (Toronto Argonauts); Charleston Rambo (Montreal Alouettes); Brendan Bordner (Hamilton Tiger-Cats); Shemar Bridges (Hamilton Tiger-Cats)
Most Outstanding Canadian	Tyrell Ford (Winnipeg Blue Bombers)	Justin McInnis (BC Lions); Tyson Philpot (Montreal Alouettes); Brady Oliveira (Winnipeg Blue Bombers)
Most Outstanding Defensive Player	Tyrell Ford (Winnipeg Blue Bombers)	Rolan Milligan (Saskatchewan Roughriders); Casey Sayles (Hamilton Tiger-Cats); Malik Carney (Saskatchewan Roughriders)
Most Outstanding Offensive Lineman	Pier-Olivier Lestage (Montreal Alouettes)	Dejon Allen (Toronto Argonauts); Martez Ivey (Edmonton Elks); Ryan Hunter (Toronto Argonauts)
John Agro Special Teams Award	Janarion Grant (Toronto Argonauts)	René Paredes (Calgary Stampeders); Sergio Castillo (Winnipeg Blue Bombers); James Letcher Jr. (Montreal Alouettes)
Annis Stukus Trophy (Coach of the Year)	Bob Dyce (Ottawa Redblacks)	Jason Maas (Montreal Alouettes); Corey Mace (Saskatchewan Roughriders)

PFF 2024 CFL midseason all-star team
Position	First Team	Second Team
Offence
Quarterback	Vernon Adams (BC Lions)	Trevor Harris (Saskatchewan Roughriders)
Running Back	Ka'Deem Carey (Toronto Argonauts)	Brady Oliveira (Winnipeg Blue Bombers)
Outside WR	Ontaria Wilson (Winnipeg Blue Bombers)	Alexander Hollins (BC Lions)
Slot WR	Justin McInnis (BC Lions)	Kurleigh Gittens Jr. (Edmonton Elks)
Slot WR	Justin Hardy (Ottawa Redblacks)	Reggie Begelton (Calgary Stampeders)
Slot WR	Marken Michel (Calgary Stampeders)	Nic Demski (Winnipeg Blue Bombers)
Outside WR	Tyson Philpot (Montreal Alouettes)	Shemar Bridges (Hamilton Tiger-Cats)
Left Tackle	Isiah Cage (Toronto Argonauts)	Martez Ivey (Edmonton Elks)
Left Guard	Pier-Olivier Lestage (Montreal Alouettes)	Ryan Hunter (Toronto Argonauts)
Center	Justin Lawrence (Montreal Alouettes)	Mark Korte (Edmonton Elks)
Right Guard	Coulter Woodmansey (Hamilton Tiger-Cats)	Dariusz Bladek (Ottawa Redblacks)
Right Tackle	Dejon Allen (Toronto Argonauts)	Jermarcus Hardrick (Saskatchewan Roughriders)
Defence
Interior	Casey Sayles (Hamilton Tiger-Cats)	Jake Ceresna (Toronto Argonauts)
Interior	Mustafa Johnson (Montreal Alouettes)	DeWayne Hendrix (Hamilton Tiger-Cats)
Edge	Malik Carney (Saskatchewan Roughriders)	Bryce Carter (Ottawa Redblacks)
Edge	Lorenzo Mauldin IV (Ottawa Redblacks)	Willie Jefferson (Winnipeg Blue Bombers)
Linebacker	Wynton McManis (Toronto Argonauts)	Kyrie Wilson (Winnipeg Blue Bombers)
Linebacker	Tyrice Beverette (Montreal Alouettes)	Jameer Thurman (Saskatchewan Roughriders)
Cover LB	Adarius Pickett (Ottawa Redblacks)	Redha Kramdi (Winnipeg Blue Bombers)
Cornerback	Tyrell Ford (Winnipeg Blue Bombers)	Garry Peters (BC Lions)
Cornerback	Kabion Ento (Montreal Alouettes)	Ciante Evans (BC Lions)
Halfback	Rolan Milligan (Saskatchewan Roughriders)	DaShaun Amos (Toronto Argonauts)
Halfback	Deatrick Nichols (Winnipeg Blue Bombers)	Kobe Williams (Calgary Stampeders)
Free Safety	Marc-Antoine Dequoy (Montreal Alouettes)	Royce Metchie (Toronto Argonauts)
Special Teams
Kicker	René Paredes (Calgary Stampeders)	Sergio Castillo (Winnipeg Blue Bombers)
Punter	Jake Julien (Edmonton Elks)	Nik Constantinou (Hamilton Tiger-Cats)
Kick Returner	Janarion Grant (Toronto Argonauts)	Javon Leake (Edmonton Elks)
Punt Returner	Janarion Grant (Toronto Argonauts)	James Letcher Jr. (Montreal Alouettes)
Special Teams	Tyrice Beverette (Montreal Alouettes)	David Mackie (BC Lions)

PFF 2024 CFL awards
Award	Winner	Honourable Mentions
Most Outstanding Player	Bo Levi Mitchell (Hamilton Tiger-Cats)	Brady Oliveira (Winnipeg Blue Bombers); Tyrice Beverette (Montreal Alouettes); Rolan Milligan (Saskatchewan Roughriders)
Most Outstanding Rookie	Ontaria Wilson (Winnipeg Blue Bombers)	Ralph Holley (Toronto Argonauts); Makai Polk (Toronto Argonauts); Shemar Bridges (Hamilton Tiger-Cats); Nick Anderson (Edmonton Elks)
Most Outstanding Canadian	Tyrell Ford (Winnipeg Blue Bombers)	Brady Oliveira (Winnipeg Blue Bombers); Justin McInnis (BC Lions); Kurleigh Gittens Jr. (Edmonton Elks)
Most Outstanding Defensive Player	Rolan Milligan (Saskatchewan Roughriders)	Tyrice Beverette (Montreal Alouettes); Garry Peters (BC Lions); Tyrell Ford (Winnipeg Blue Bombers)
Most Outstanding Offensive Lineman	Pier-Olivier Lestage (Montreal Alouettes)	Martez Ivey (Edmonton Elks); Joshua Coker (Calgary Stampeders); Brandon Revenberg (Hamilton Tiger-Cats)
John Agro Special Teams Award	Jake Julien (Edmonton Elks)	René Paredes (Calgary Stampeders); Sergio Castillo (Winnipeg Blue Bombers); Janarion Grant (Toronto Argonauts)
Annis Stukus Trophy (Coach of the Year)	Corey Mace (Saskatchewan Roughriders)	Jason Maas (Montreal Alouettes); Mike O'Shea (Winnipeg Blue Bombers)

PFF 2024 All-CFL team
Position	First Team	Second Team
Offence
Quarterback	Bo Levi Mitchell (Hamilton Tiger-Cats)	Trevor Harris (Saskatchewan Roughriders)
Running Back	Brady Oliveira (Winnipeg Blue Bombers)	Ka'Deem Carey (Toronto Argonauts)
Wide Receiver	Justin McInnis (BC Lions)	Nic Demski (Winnipeg Blue Bombers)
Wide Receiver	Justin Hardy (Ottawa Redblacks)	Makai Polk (Toronto Argonauts)
Wide Receiver	Reggie Begelton (Calgary Stampeders)	Shemar Bridges (Hamilton Tiger-Cats)
Wide Receiver	Ontaria Wilson (Winnipeg Blue Bombers)	Kurleigh Gittens Jr. (Edmonton Elks)
Wide Receiver	Eugene Lewis (Edmonton Elks)	Samuel Emilus (Saskatchewan Roughriders)
Left Tackle	Martez Ivey (Edmonton Elks)	Nick Callender (Montreal Alouettes)
Left Guard	Pier-Olivier Lestage (Montreal Alouettes)	Brandon Revenberg (Hamilton Tiger-Cats)
Center	Justin Lawrence (Montreal Alouettes)	Mark Korte (Edmonton Elks)
Right Guard	Coulter Woodmansey (Hamilton Tiger-Cats)	Logan Ferland (Saskatchewan Roughriders)
Right Tackle	Joshua Coker (Calgary Stampeders)	Brett Boyko (Edmonton Elks)
Defence
Interior	Casey Sayles (Hamilton Tiger-Cats)	Shawn Oakman (Edmonton Elks)
Interior	Ralph Holley (Toronto Argonauts)	Jake Ceresna (Toronto Argonauts)
Edge	Malik Carney (Saskatchewan Roughriders)	Lorenzo Mauldin IV (Ottawa Redblacks)
Edge	Folarin Orimolade (Toronto Argonauts)	Willie Jefferson (Winnipeg Blue Bombers)
Linebacker	Tyrice Beverette (Montreal Alouettes)	Tony Jones (Winnipeg Blue Bombers)
Linebacker	Wynton McManis (Toronto Argonauts)	Nick Anderson (Edmonton Elks)
Cover LB	Adarius Pickett (Ottawa Redblacks)	Redha Kramdi (Winnipeg Blue Bombers)
Cornerback	Tyrell Ford (Winnipeg Blue Bombers)	Marcus Sayles (Saskatchewan Roughriders)
Cornerback	Garry Peters (BC Lions)	Kabion Ento (Montreal Alouettes)
Halfback	Rolan Milligan (Saskatchewan Roughriders)	Damon Webb (Ottawa Redblacks)
Halfback	Deatrick Nichols (Winnipeg Blue Bombers)	Richard Leonard (Hamilton Tiger-Cats)
Free Safety	Stavros Katsantonis (Hamilton Tiger-Cats)	Loucheiz Purifoy (Edmonton Elks)
Special Teams
Kicker	René Paredes (Calgary Stampeders)	Sergio Castillo (Winnipeg Blue Bombers)
Punter	Jake Julien (Edmonton Elks)	Nik Constantinou (Hamilton Tiger-Cats)
Kick Returner	DeVonte Dedmon (Ottawa Redblacks)	James Letcher Jr. (Montreal Alouettes)
Punt Returner	Janarion Grant (Toronto Argonauts)	James Letcher Jr. (Montreal Alouettes)
Special Teams	A.J. Allen (Saskatchewan Roughriders)	Tyrice Beverette (Montreal Alouettes)

=== 3DownNation ===
Best of the Week
Week	Offensive Player	Defensive Player	Special Teams Player	Breakout Player	Offensive Line	Coach
1	Shawn Bane Jr.	Jared Brinkman	René Paredes	Cameron Dukes	Calgary Stampeders	Ryan Dinwiddie
2	Bo Levi Mitchell	Damon Webb	Brett Lauther	Ryquell Armstead	Ottawa Redblacks	Scott Milanovich
3	Alexander Hollins	Tyrice Beverette	DeVonte Dedmon	Shemar Bridges	BC Lions	Jarious Jackson
4	Tim White	Garry Peters	René Paredes	Geoffrey Cantin-Arku	Calgary Stampeders	Jason Maas
5	Vernon Adams	Rolan Milligan	Sergio Castillo	Davon Harris	Montreal Alouettes	Jordan Maksymic
6	Justin McInnis	Deatrick Nichols	Janarion Grant	Ontaria Wilson	Calgary Stampeders	Tommy Condell
7	Jake Maier	Bryce Carter	Janarion Grant	Ajou Ajou	Saskatchewan Roughriders	Brent Monson
8	Bo Levi Mitchell	Jake Ceresna	Kalil Pimpleton	Kalil Pimpleton	Hamilton Tiger-Cats	Bob Dyce
9	Javon Leake	Willie Jefferson	Sergio Castillo	Davis Alexander	Edmonton Elks	Jordan Younger
10	Charleston Rambo	DaShaun Amos	Janarion Grant	Charleston Rambo	Montreal Alouettes	Mickey Donovan
11	Ryquell Armstead	Tyrell Ford	James Letcher Jr.	Greg Bell	Saskatchewan Roughriders	Jordan Younger
12	Dru Brown	C.J. Reavis	Brett Lauther	Nick Mardner	Ottawa Redblacks	Chris Jones
13	McLeod Bethel-Thompson	Jamal Peters	Peyton Logan	Devodric Bynum	Edmonton Elks	Jarious Jackson
14	Dominique Rhymes	Damon Webb	Cody Grace	Andre Miller	Ottawa Redblacks	Mike O'Shea
15	Steven Dunbar	Ralph Holley	Lirim Hajrullahu	Destin Talbert	Hamilton Tiger-Cats	Kevin Eiben/ William Fields
16	Ryquell Armstead	Tony Jones	Marc Liegghio	Justin Rankin	Saskatchewan Roughriders	Jordan Younger
17	Zach Collaros	Rolan Milligan	James Letcher Jr.	Dhel Duncan-Busby	Toronto Argonauts	Buck Pierce
18	Brady Oliveira	T.J. Lee	Sean Whyte	Ben Labrosse	Winnipeg Blue Bombers	Marty Costello
19	Justin Rankin	Folarin Orimolade	Cody Grace	Caleb Sanders	Toronto Argonauts	Corey Mace
20	Bo Levi Mitchell	Ryder Varga	James Peter	Clarence Hicks	Hamilton Tiger-Cats	Scott Milanovich
21	Tre Ford	Tyrice Beverette	Lucky Whitehead	Jerminic Smith	Edmonton Elks	Tommy Condell

2024 mid-season CFL award winners
Award	Winner	Runner-ups
Most Outstanding Player	Vernon Adams (BC Lions)	Rolan Milligan (Saskatchewan Roughriders); Justin McInnis (BC Lions)
Most Outstanding Defensive Player	Rolan Milligan (Saskatchewan Roughriders)	Tyrice Beverette (Montreal Alouettes); Adarius Pickett (Ottawa Redblacks)
Most Outstanding Canadian	Justin McInnis (BC Lions)	Tyson Philpot (Montreal Alouettes); Tyrell Ford (Winnipeg Blue Bombers)
Most Outstanding Offensive Lineman	Pier-Olivier Lestage (Montreal Alouettes)	Dejon Allen (Toronto Argonauts); Nick Callender (Montreal Alouettes)
Most Outstanding Rookie	Shemar Bridges (Hamilton Tiger-Cats)	Ontaria Wilson (Winnipeg Blue Bombers); Kalil Pimpleton (Ottawa Redblacks)
Most Outstanding Special Teams Player	Janarion Grant (Toronto Argonauts)	Sean Whyte (BC Lions); René Paredes (Calgary Stampeders)
Coach of the Year	Jason Maas (Montreal Alouettes)	Corey Mace (Saskatchewan Roughriders); Bob Dyce (Ottawa Redblacks)

2024 mid-season All-CFL teams
—	Offence			Defence			Special teams
—	Backfield	Receivers	Linemen	Primary	Secondary	Backfield	Special teams
First Team	QB (United States) Adams (BC); RB (Canada) Oliveira (WPG)	Outside (Canada) McInnis (BC); Slot (Canada) Philpot (MTL); Slot (United States) Hardy (OTT); Slot (United States) Hollins (BC); Outside (United States) Bridges (HAM)	LT (United States) Allen (TOR); LG (United States) Callender (MTL); C (Canada) Lestage (MTL); RG (Canada) Hunter (TOR); RT (Canada) Lawrence (MTL)	Edge (United States) Mauldin IV (OTT); Interior (United States) Sayles (HAM); Interior (United States) Ceresna (TOR); Edge (United States) Carney (SSK)	CB (Canada) Ford (WPG); HB (United States) Peters (BC); LB (United States) Beverette (MTL); LB (United States) McManis (TOR); Cover LB (United States) Pickett (OTT); HB (United States) Milligan (SSK); CB (United States) Holm (WPG)	S (Canada) Metchie (TOR)	K (Canada) Whyte (BC); P (Canada) Julien (EDM); Returner (United States) Grant (TOR); Special Teams (Canada) Cassar (TOR)
Second Team	QB (United States) Fajardo (MTL); RB (United States) Carey (TOR)	Outside (United States) Wilson (WPG); Slot (United States) Begelton (CGY); Slot (Canada) Emilus (SSK); Slot (Canada) Gittens Jr. (EDM); Outside (United States) Pimpleton (OTT)	LT (United States) Bryant (WPG); LG (United States) Hardrick (SSK); C (Canada) Ferland (SSK); RG (Canada) Revenberg (HAM); RT (Canada) Korte (EDM)	Edge (United States) Jefferson (WPG); Interior (United States) Johnson (MTL); Interior (United States) Lanier II (SSK); Edge (United States) Carter (OTT)	CB (United States) Houston (CGY); HB (United States) Ento (MTL); LB (United States) Thurman (SSK); LB (United States) Morgan (EDM); Cover LB (Canada) Kramdi (WPG); HB (United States) Amos (TOR); CB (United States) Nichols (WPG)	S (Canada) Addae (OTT)	K (United States) Castillo (WPG); P (Australia) Haggerty (TOR); Returner (United States) Dedmon (OTT); Special Teams (United States) Milligan (SSK)

2024 All-CFL teams
—	Offence			Defence			Special teams
—	Backfield	Receivers	Linemen	Primary	Secondary	Backfield	Special teams
First Team	QB (United States) Mitchell (HAM); RB (Canada) Oliveira (WPG)	WR (United States) Hardy (OTT); WR (Canada) McInnis (BC); WR (United States) Polk (TOR); WR (United States) Begelton (CGY); WR (United States) Lewis (EDM)	LT (United States) Ivey (EDM); LG (Canada) Ferland (SSK); C (Canada) Lawrence (MTL); RG (Canada) Hunter (TOR); RT (United States) Allen (TOR)	Edge (United States) Mauldin IV (OTT); Interior (United States) Sayles (HAM); Interior (United States) Ceresna (TOR); Edge (United States) Carney (SSK)	CB (Canada) Ford (WPG); HB (United States) Milligan (SSK); LB (United States) Beverette (MTL); LB (United States) Thurman (SSK); Cover LB (United States) Pickett (OTT); HB (United States) Nichols (WPG); CB (United States) Sayles (SSK)	S (United States) Purifoy (EDM)	K (Canada) Whyte (BC); P (Canada) Julien (EDM); Returner (United States) Grant (TOR); Special Teams (Canada) Cassar (TOR)
Second Team	QB (United States) Harris (SSK); RB (United States) Rankin (EDM)	WR (United States) Bridges (HAM); WR (Canada) Philpot (MTL); WR (United States) Pimpleton (OTT); WR (United States) White (HAM); WR (Canada) Emilus (SSK)	LT (United States) Bordner (HAM); LG (United States) Coker (CGY); C (Canada) Lestage (MTL); RG (Canada) Woodmansey (HAM); RT (Canada) Korte (EDM)	Edge (United States) Jefferson (WPG); Interior (United States) Wakefield (OTT); Interior (United States) Holley (TOR); Edge (United States) Orimolade (TOR)	CB (United States) Ento (MTL); HB (United States) Amos (TOR); LB (United States) Anderson (EDM); LB (United States) McManis (TOR); Cover LB (United States) Reavis (SSK); HB (United States) Webb (OTT); CB (United States) Peters (BC)	S (Canada) Katsantonis (HAM)	K (United States) Castillo (WPG); P (Australia) Haggerty (TOR); Returner (United States) Letcher Jr. (MTL); Special Teams (United States) Allen (SSK)

== 2024 All-CFL teams ==
=== 2024 All-CFL team ===
==== Offence ====
- QB – Bo Levi Mitchell, Hamilton Tiger-Cats
- RB – Brady Oliveira, Winnipeg Blue Bombers
- R – Justin McInnis, BC Lions
- R – Justin Hardy, Ottawa Redblacks
- R – Reggie Begelton, Calgary Stampeders
- R – Eugene Lewis, Edmonton Elks
- R – Tim White, Hamilton Tiger-Cats
- OT – Stanley Bryant, Winnipeg Blue Bombers
- OT – Dejon Allen, Toronto Argonauts
- OG – Logan Ferland, Saskatchewan Roughriders
- OG – Ryan Hunter, Toronto Argonauts
- C – David Beard, Hamilton Tiger-Cats

==== Defence ====
- DT – Jake Ceresna, Toronto Argonauts
- DT – Micah Johnson, Saskatchewan Roughriders
- DE – Willie Jefferson, Winnipeg Blue Bombers
- DE – Lorenzo Mauldin IV, Ottawa Redblacks
- LB – Tyrice Beverette, Montreal Alouettes
- LB – Nick Anderson, Edmonton Elks
- CLB – C.J. Reavis, Saskatchewan Roughriders
- CB – Tyrell Ford, Winnipeg Blue Bombers
- CB – Marcus Sayles, Saskatchewan Roughriders
- HB – Rolan Milligan, Saskatchewan Roughriders
- HB – Damon Webb, Ottawa Redblacks
- S – Marc-Antoine Dequoy, Montreal Alouettes

==== Special teams ====
- K – Sean Whyte, BC Lions
- P – Jake Julien, Edmonton Elks
- ST – Janarion Grant, Toronto Argonauts

=== 2024 Western All-CFL team ===
==== Offence ====
- QB – Trevor Harris, Saskatchewan Roughriders
- RB – Brady Oliveira, Winnipeg Blue Bombers
- R – Justin McInnis, BC Lions
- R – Samuel Emilus, Saskatchewan Roughriders
- R – Reggie Begelton, Calgary Stampeders
- R – Eugene Lewis, Edmonton Elks
- R – Nic Demski, Winnipeg Blue Bombers
- OT – Stanley Bryant, Winnipeg Blue Bombers
- OT – Martez Ivey, Edmonton Elks
- OG – Logan Ferland, Saskatchewan Roughriders
- OG – Liam Dobson, Winnipeg Blue Bombers
- C – Mark Korte, Edmonton Elks

==== Defence ====
- DT – Mike Rose, Calgary Stampeders
- DT – Micah Johnson, Saskatchewan Roughriders
- DE – Elliott Brown, Edmonton Elks
- DE – Willie Jefferson, Winnipeg Blue Bombers
- LB – Jameer Thurman, Saskatchewan Roughriders
- LB – Nick Anderson, Edmonton Elks
- CLB – C.J. Reavis, Saskatchewan Roughriders
- CB – Tyrell Ford, Winnipeg Blue Bombers
- CB – Marcus Sayles, Saskatchewan Roughriders
- HB – Rolan Milligan, Saskatchewan Roughriders
- HB – Deatrick Nichols, Winnipeg Blue Bombers
- S – Loucheiz Purifoy, Edmonton Elks

==== Special teams ====
- K – Sean Whyte, BC Lions
- P – Jake Julien, Edmonton Elks
- ST – Rolan Milligan, Saskatchewan Roughriders

=== 2024 Eastern All-CFL team ===
==== Offence ====
- QB – Bo Levi Mitchell, Hamilton Tiger-Cats
- RB – Ka'Deem Carey, Toronto Argonauts
- R – Justin Hardy, Ottawa Redblacks
- R – Tim White, Hamilton Tiger-Cats
- R – Shemar Bridges, Hamilton Tiger-Cats
- R – Makai Polk, Toronto Argonauts
- R – Steven Dunbar Jr., Hamilton Tiger-Cats
- OT – Dejon Allen, Toronto Argonauts
- OT – Nick Callender, Montreal Alouettes
- OG – Ryan Hunter, Toronto Argonauts
- OG – Drew Desjarlais, Ottawa Redblacks
- C – David Beard, Hamilton Tiger-Cats

==== Defence ====
- DT – Jake Ceresna, Toronto Argonauts
- DT – Michael Wakefield, Ottawa Redblacks
- DE – Lorenzo Mauldin IV, Ottawa Redblacks
- DE – Isaac Adeyemi-Berglund, Montreal Alouettes
- LB – Tyrice Beverette, Montreal Alouettes
- LB – Darnell Sankey, Montreal Alouettes
- CLB – Adarius Pickett, Ottawa Redblacks
- CB – Jamal Peters, Hamilton Tiger-Cats
- CB – Kabion Ento, Montreal Alouettes
- HB – DaShaun Amos, Toronto Argonauts
- HB – Damon Webb, Ottawa Redblacks
- S – Marc-Antoine Dequoy, Montreal Alouettes

==== Special teams ====
- K – Lirim Hajrullahu, Toronto Argonauts
- P – John Haggerty, Toronto Argonauts
- ST – Janarion Grant, Toronto Argonauts

== 2024 CFL awards ==
Award	West Division	East Division	League
Most Outstanding Player	Brady Oliveira (Winnipeg Blue Bombers)	Bo Levi Mitchell (Hamilton Tiger-Cats)	Brady Oliveira (Winnipeg Blue Bombers)
Most Outstanding Canadian	Brady Oliveira (Winnipeg Blue Bombers)	Isaac Adeyemi-Berglund (Montreal Alouettes)	Brady Oliveira (Winnipeg Blue Bombers)
Most Outstanding Defensive Player	Rolan Milligan (Saskatchewan Roughriders)	Tyrice Beverette (Montreal Alouettes)	Rolan Milligan (Saskatchewan Roughriders)
Most Outstanding Offensive Lineman	Logan Ferland (Saskatchewan Roughriders)	Ryan Hunter (Toronto Argonauts)	Ryan Hunter (Toronto Argonauts)
Most Outstanding Special Teams Player	Sean Whyte (BC Lions)	Janarion Grant (Toronto Argonauts)	Janarion Grant (Toronto Argonauts)
Most Outstanding Rookie	Nick Anderson (Edmonton Elks)	Shemar Bridges (Hamilton Tiger-Cats)	Nick Anderson (Edmonton Elks)
Coach of the Year	Corey Mace (Saskatchewan Roughriders)	Jason Maas (Montreal Alouettes)	Jason Maas (Montreal Alouettes)

- Tom Pate Memorial Award – Adam Bighill (LB), Winnipeg Blue Bombers
- Jake Gaudaur Veterans' Trophy – Jorgen Hus (LS), Saskatchewan Roughriders
- Commissioner's Award – Amar Doman, BC Lions owner
- Hugh Campbell Distinguished Leadership Award – Stephen Shamie, CFL legal counsel
- Jane Mawby Tribute Award – Carolyn Cody, BC Lions Vice President, Business Operations & Marketing
