= Woodmansey (surname) =

Woodmansey is an English surname. Notable people with the surname include:

- Coulter Woodmansey (born 1997), Canadian football player
- Mick Woodmansey (born 1950), English drummer
