= Elliott Brown (gridiron football) =

American football player (born 1998)

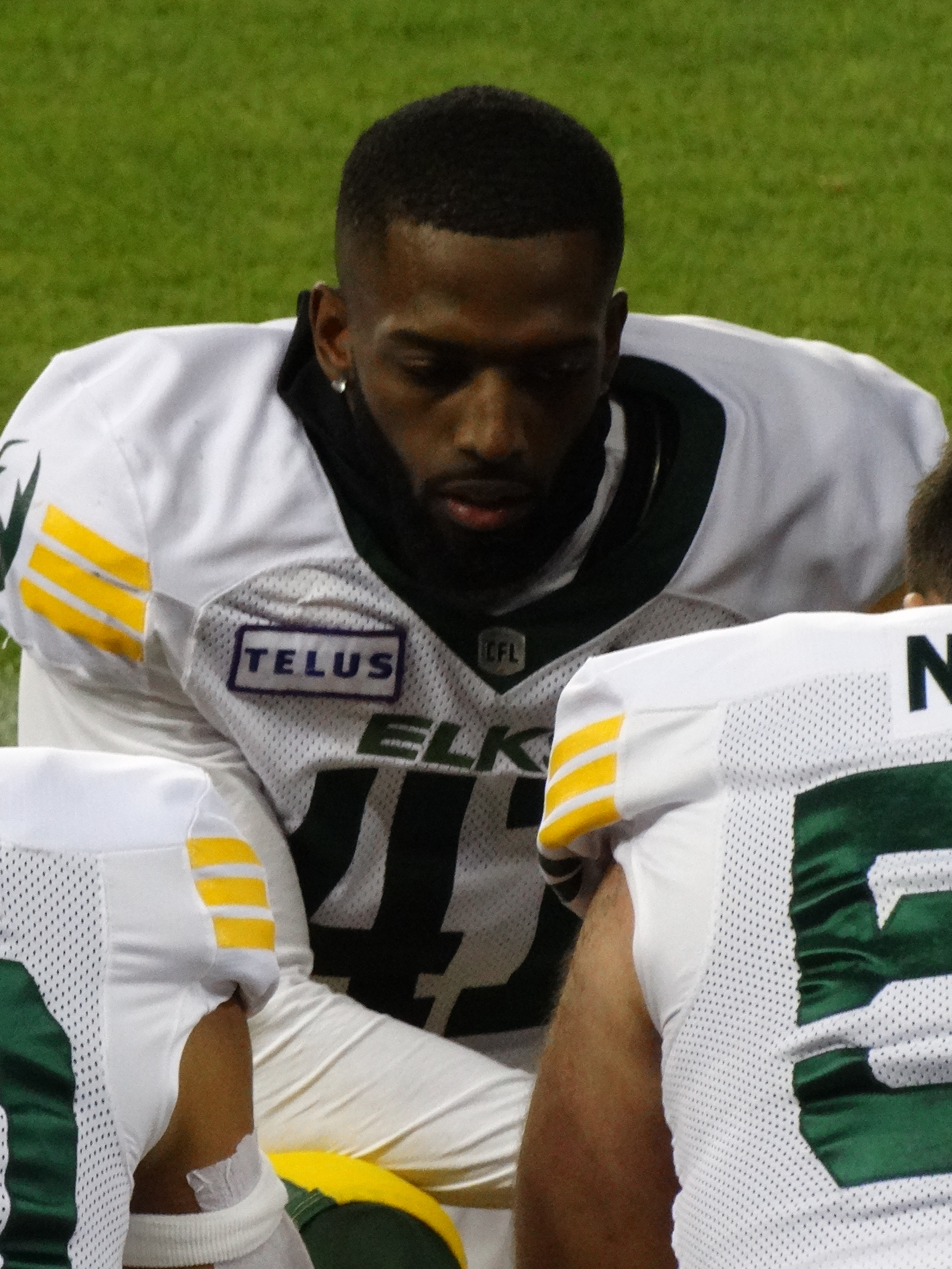
- Brown with the Edmonton Elks in 2023

Profile
- Position: Outside linebacker

Personal information
- Born: February 2, 1998 (age 28); Odenton, Maryland, U.S.
- Listed height: 6 ft 5 in (1.96 m)
- Listed weight: 245 lb (111 kg)

Career information
- High school: Charles Herbert Flowers (Springdale, Maryland)
- College: Virginia (2017–2021)
- NFL draft: 2022: undrafted

Career history
- Edmonton Elks (2023–2024); Arizona Cardinals (2025)*
- * Offseason or practice squad member only

Awards and highlights
- CFL West All-Star (2024)
- Stats at Pro Football Reference
- Stats at CFL.ca

Elliott Brown (born February 2, 1998) is an American professional football outside linebacker. He played college football for the Virginia Cavaliers and has also played for the Edmonton Elks of the Canadian Football League (CFL).

== Early life ==
Elliott Brown was born on February 2, 1998, in Odenton, Maryland. He first played high school football at Charles Herbert Flowers High School in Springdale, Maryland, as a wide receiver. He caught 12 passes for 87 yards and one touchdown his senior year in 2015. Brown also participated in basketball and track at Flowers High.

Brown then spent a postgraduate year at the Taft School in Watertown, Connecticut, in 2016. He continued in all three sports at Taft. In football, he caught 53 passes for 504 yards and five touchdowns on offense while also posting two sacks on defense. He was rated a three-star recruit by ESPN.com and a two-star recruit by both Scout.com and 247Sports.com.

== College career ==
Brown played college football for the Virginia Cavaliers of the University of Virginia. He played in ten games as a true freshman in 2017, recording two assisted tackles and 0.5 sacks. He appeared in all 13 games the next year in 2018, posting two solo tackles, three assisted tackles, one sack, and one interception. Brown played in eight games during the 2019 season, totaling one solo tackle, seven assisted tackles, and 0.5 sacks. He appeared in all ten games, including his first career start, in 2020, recording three solo tackles, one assisted tackle, and one pass breakup. He was named to the ACC Academic Honor Roll for the 2020–21 school year. Brown played in 12 games, starting five, as a senior in 2021, totaling 25 solo tackles, 17 assisted tackles, three sacks, and one pass breakup. He majored in foreign affairs at Virginia.

== Professional career ==
Pre-draft measurables
Height	Weight	Arm length	Hand span	Wingspan	40-yard dash	10-yard split	20-yard split	Vertical jump	Broad jump	Bench press
6 ft 5 in (1.96 m)	232 lb (105 kg)	33 1/2 in (0.85 m)	9 3/4 in (0.25 m)	6 ft 9 5/8 in (2.07 m)	4.59 s	1.58 s	2.70 s	37.0 in (0.94 m)	10 ft 6 in (3.20 m)	23 reps
All values from Pro Day

=== Edmonton Elks ===
Brown was signed to the practice roster of the Edmonton Elks of the Canadian Football League (CFL) on June 4, 2023. He was promoted to the active roster on July 12, placed on injured reserve on August 16, and activated on September 14, 2023. He dressed in nine games, starting three overall, during the 2023 season, posting ten defensive tackles, two sacks, and one forced fumble.

Brown started all 18 games for Edmonton in 2024, recording 44 defensive tackles, eight sacks, one forced fumble, and one pass breakup. The Elks finished the 2024 season with a 7–11 record. His eight sacks were tied for the most in the league. He earned CFL West All-Star honors for his performance during the 2024 season. The Elks released Brown on January 8, 2025, so he could pursue NFL opportunities.

=== Arizona Cardinals ===
Brown signed a futures deal with the Arizona Cardinals on January 13, 2025. In March 2025, he participated in the CFL mentorship program, which is a "joint venture between the [CFL] and CFL Players’ Association that provides a behind-the-scenes look at the business of the game and potential opportunities after football." He was waived on August 26 as part of final roster cuts and re-signed to the practice squad the next day. Brown was released on September 17 before being re-signed to the practice squad on September 23. He signed a reserve/future contract on January 5, 2026.

On August 30, 2026, Brown was waived by the Cardinals.
