= Nick Callender =

American gridiron football player (born 1994)

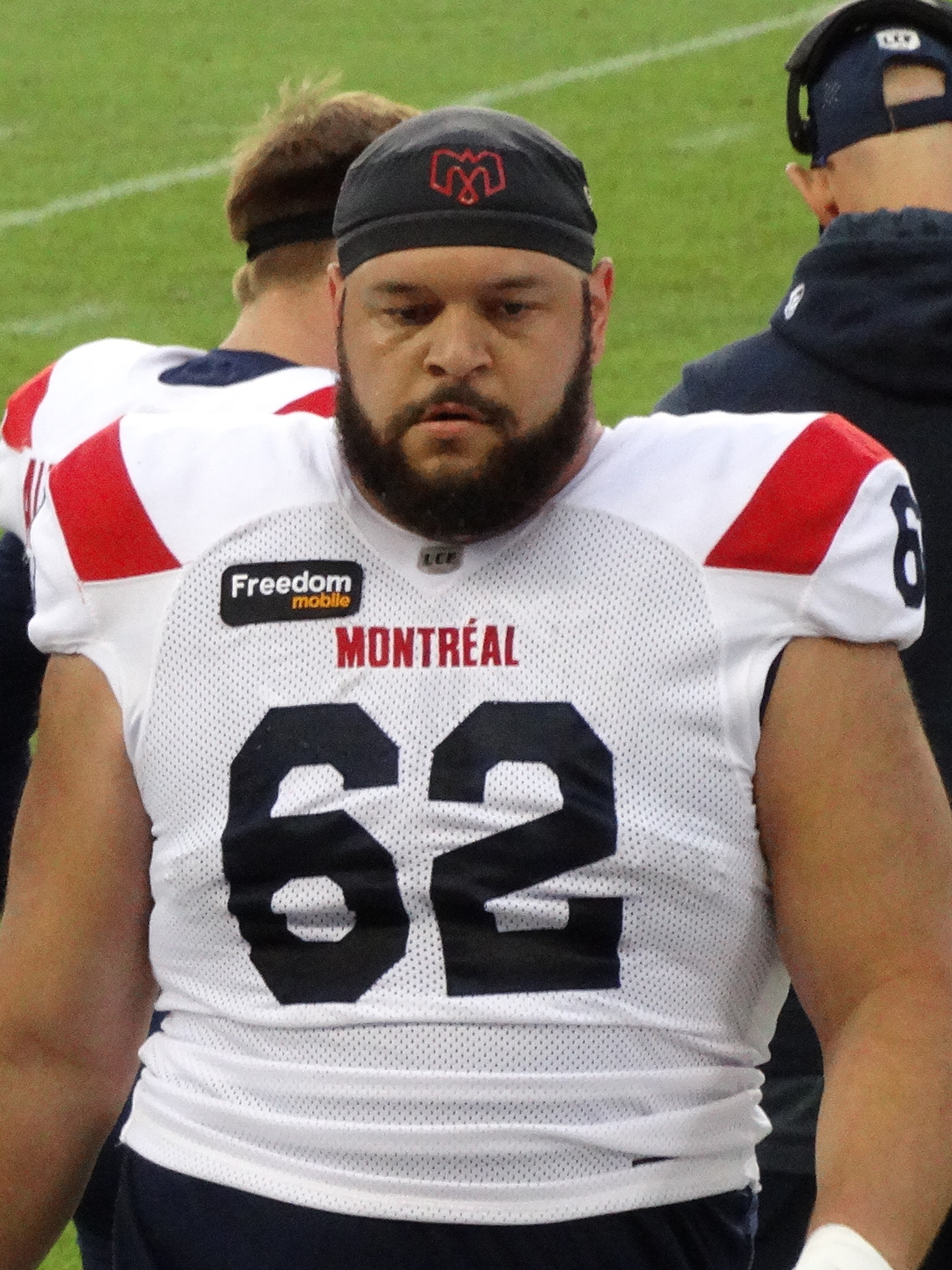
- Callender with the Montreal Alouettes in 2024

No. 62 – Montreal Alouettes
- Position: Offensive tackle
- Roster status: Active
- CFL status: American

Personal information
- Born: June 16, 1994 (age 32); Berkeley, California, U.S.
- Listed height: 6 ft 6 in (1.98 m)
- Listed weight: 356 lb (161 kg)

Career information
- High school: St. Mary's (Albany, California)
- College: Colorado State
- NFL draft: 2017: undrafted

Career history
- Seattle Seahawks (2018)*; Indianapolis Colts (2018)*; Salt Lake Stallions (2019); Houston Roughnecks (2020); Montreal Alouettes (2021–present)
- * Offseason or practice squad member only

Awards and highlights
- Grey Cup champion (2023); 4× CFL East All-Star (2023, 2024, 2025, 2026)
- Stats at Pro Football Reference
- Stats at CFL.ca

Nick Callender (born June 16, 1994) is an American professional football offensive tackle for the Montreal Alouettes of the Canadian Football League (CFL).

== College career ==
After using a redshirt season in 2012, Callender played college football for the Colorado State Rams from 2013 to 2016. He played in 37 games for Rams and started in 21 of them.

== Professional career ==
Pre-draft measurables
Height	Weight	Arm length	Hand span	Wingspan	40-yard dash	10-yard split	20-yard split	20-yard shuttle	Three-cone drill	Vertical jump	Broad jump	Bench press
6 ft 5 1/2 in (1.97 m)	321 lb (146 kg)	31 5/8 in (0.80 m)	9 3/8 in (0.24 m)	6 ft 7 1/4 in (2.01 m)	5.15 s	1.81 s	2.97 s	4.46 s	7.60 s	34.0 in (0.86 m)	8 ft 10 in (2.69 m)	23 reps
All values from Pro Day

=== Seattle Seahawks ===
Callender ruptured his Achilles tendon shortly after his college career and was not drafted in 2017 NFL draft. Following his recovery, he signed as an undrafted free agent with the Seattle Seahawks on May 7, 2018. However, he was waived prior to the preseason on June 12, 2018.

=== Indianapolis Colts ===
On August 2, 2018, Callender signed with the Indianapolis Colts. However, he was released among the final roster cuts on September 1, 2018.

=== Salt Lake Stallions ===
Callender played in six games for the Salt Lake Stallions in 2019. The league ceased operations in April 2019 and his contract was terminated.

=== Houston Roughnecks ===
Callender next played for the Houston Roughnecks in 2020, but he had his contract terminated when the league suspended operations on April 10, 2020.

=== Montreal Alouettes ===
On June 30, 2021, it was announced that Callender had been signed by the Montreal Alouettes. Following training camp, he began the 2021 season on the practice roster, but made his professional debut on October 16, 2021, against the Ottawa Redblacks, as a backup. He played in five regular season games in his rookie year, starting in two.

In 2022, Callender began the year on the injured list, but played and started in the last 16 games of the regular season. He signed a two-year contract extension on February 23, 2023. In the next season, he played and started in all 18 regular season games at left tackle. For his strong season, he was named an East Division All-Star.

== Personal life ==
Callender was born in Berkeley, California to parents Meredith and Henry Callender and has a younger sister.

Nick Callender has been associated with the Warehouse on Crescent Street in Montreal.
