= Jared Brinkman =

American gridiron football player (born 1999)

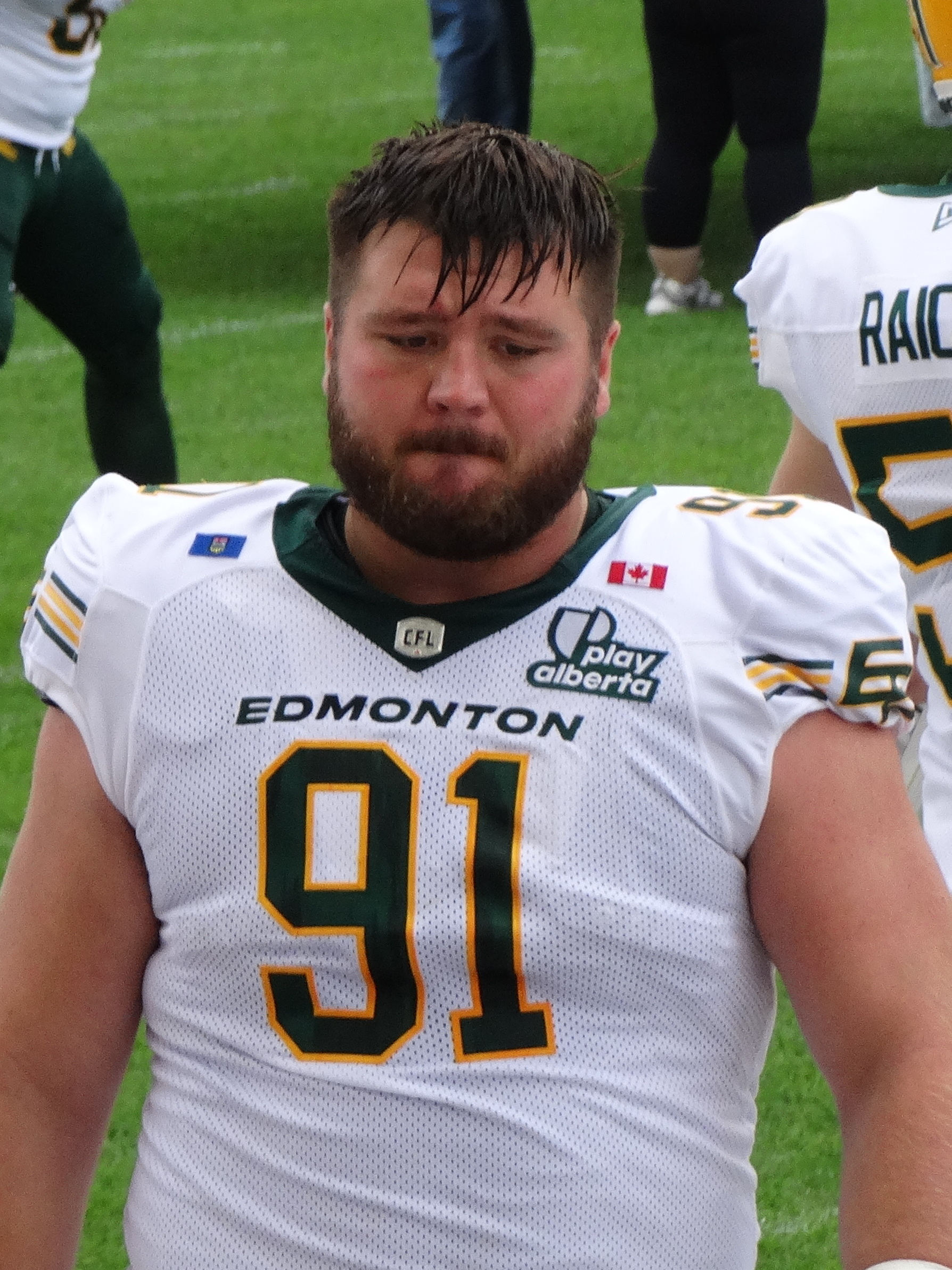
- Brinkman with the Edmonton Elks in 2025

No. 91 – Edmonton Elks
- Position: Defensive lineman
- Roster status: Active
- CFL status: American

Personal information
- Born: February 19, 1999 (age 27); Holland, Michigan, U.S.
- Listed height: 6 ft 1 in (1.85 m)
- Listed weight: 290 lb (132 kg)

Career information
- High school: Regina (Iowa City, Iowa)
- College: Northern Iowa
- NFL draft: 2022: undrafted

Career history
- Toronto Argonauts (2022–2024); Edmonton Eskimos (2025–present)

Awards and highlights
- 3× Grey Cup champion (2022, 2024, 2026); 2× Missouri Valley Defensive Player of the Year (2020, 2021)
- Stats at CFL.ca

Jared Brinkman (born February 19, 1999) is an American professional football defensive lineman for the Edmonton Elks of the Canadian Football League (CFL). He is a two-time Grey Cup champion, having won with the Toronto Argonauts in 2022 and 2024.

== College career ==
Brinkman played college football for the Northern Iowa Panthers from 2017 to 2021. He played in 55 games where he had 209 tackles, 39.5 tackles for loss, 18.5 sacks, six forced fumbles, and three fumble recoveries.

== Professional career ==
Pre-draft measurables
Height	Weight	Arm length	Hand span	Wingspan	40-yard dash	10-yard split	20-yard split	20-yard shuttle	Three-cone drill	Vertical jump	Broad jump	Bench press
6 ft 0 1/4 in (1.84 m)	292 lb (132 kg)	33 in (0.84 m)	10 1/8 in (0.26 m)	6 ft 4 in (1.93 m)	5.16 s	1.76 s	2.94 s	4.71 s	7.75 s	33.5 in (0.85 m)	9 ft 1 in (2.77 m)	35 reps
All values from Pro Day

=== Toronto Argonauts ===
On September 29, 2022, it was announced that Brinkman had signed with the Toronto Argonauts of the Canadian Football League (CFL). He spent time on the team's practice roster before making his professional debut in the final game of the regular season on October 29, 2022, against the Montreal Alouettes, where he recorded two defensive tackles. He did not play in the team's East Final victory, but he did make his post-season debut in the 109th Grey Cup game where he had two defensive tackles. Brinkman won his first professional championship as the Argonauts defeated the Winnipeg Blue Bombers by a score of 24–23.

In the 2023 season, Brinkman played and started in all 18 regular season games, where he recorded 12 defensive tackles and one sack. In the 2024 season, he began he season as an opening day starter, but was moved to the injured list after six games. He returned as a backup for the team's final five regular season games, and finished with 11 games played where he had 17 defensive tackles, three sacks, and one forced fumble. He played in all three post-season games, including the 111th Grey Cup where he had two defensive tackles in the Argonauts' 41–24 victory over the Winnipeg Blue Bombers.

=== Edmonton Elks ===
Brinkman joined the Edmonton Elks through free agency on February 12, 2025.

== Personal life ==
Brinkman was born to parents Mike and Carla Brinkman and has one brother, Jake.
