= Kobe Williams =

American gridiron football player (born 1998)

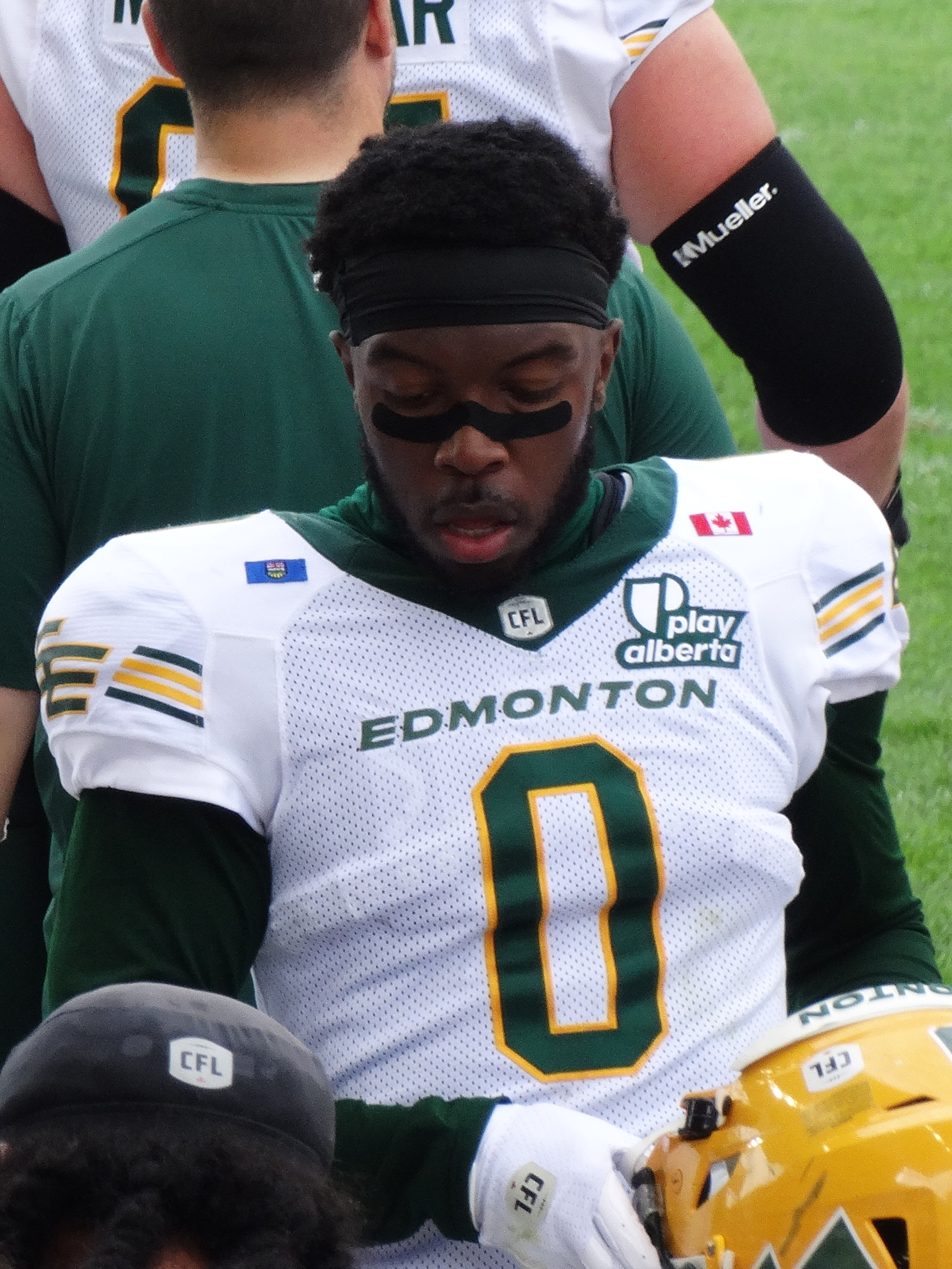
- Williams with the Edmonton Elks in 2025

No. 0 – Edmonton Elks
- Position: Defensive back
- Roster status: Active
- CFL status: American

Personal information
- Born: November 16, 1998 (age 28); Long Beach, California, U.S.
- Listed height: 5 ft 9 in (1.75 m)
- Listed weight: 174 lb (79 kg)

Career information
- High school: Long Beach Polytechnic High
- College: Arizona State
- NFL draft: 2020: undrafted

Career history
- Jacksonville Jaguars (2020)*; Calgary Stampeders (2021–2024); Edmonton Elks (2025–present)
- * Offseason or practice squad member only

Awards and highlights
- Grey Cup champion (2026)

Career CFL statistics as of 2026
- Total tackles: 247
- Sacks: 1
- Forced fumbles: 3
- Interceptions: 3
- Stats at CFL.ca

Kobe Williams (born November 16, 1998) is an American professional football defensive back for the Edmonton Elks of the Canadian Football League (CFL).

== College career ==
Williams first played college football for the Long Beach City College Vikings in 2016 where he played in 11 games and recorded 21 tackles, five pass break ups, and one interception. He then transferred to Arizona State University to play for the Sun Devils from 2017 to 2019. He played in 38 games for Arizona State where he had 143 total tackles, two interceptions, one forced fumble, and one fumble recovery.

== Professional career ==
Pre-draft measurables
Height	Weight	Arm length	Hand span	Wingspan
5 ft 8 5/8 in (1.74 m)	176 lb (80 kg)	29 3/4 in (0.76 m)	9 1/2 in (0.24 m)	5 ft 11 7/8 in (1.83 m)
All values from Pro Day

=== Jacksonville Jaguars ===
Williams signed as an undrafted free agent with the Jacksonville Jaguars on April 27, 2020. However, he was released during training camp on August 10, 2020.

=== Calgary Stampeders ===
On June 11, 2021, it was announced that Williams had signed with the Calgary Stampeders. He began the 2021 season on the practice roster, but made his professional debut in Week 7 against the Hamilton Tiger-Cats on September 17, 2021 where he had two defensive tackles. He played in just the one game in 2021 while spending the remainder of the year on the practice roster. He re-signed with the team on February 28, 2022.

In 2022 season, Williams made the team's active roster following training camp and played in the team's season opener against the Montreal Alouettes where he recorded four defensive tackles. However, he spent the next six games on the injured list followed by a one-game stint on the practice roster. He returned to play against the Toronto Argonauts on August 20, 2022, as the starting halfback before moving to the Sam linebacker position two weeks later.

=== Edmonton Elks ===
The Edmonton Elks announced they had signed Williams through free agency on February 11, 2025.
