= Ralph Holley =

American gridiron football player (born 1999)

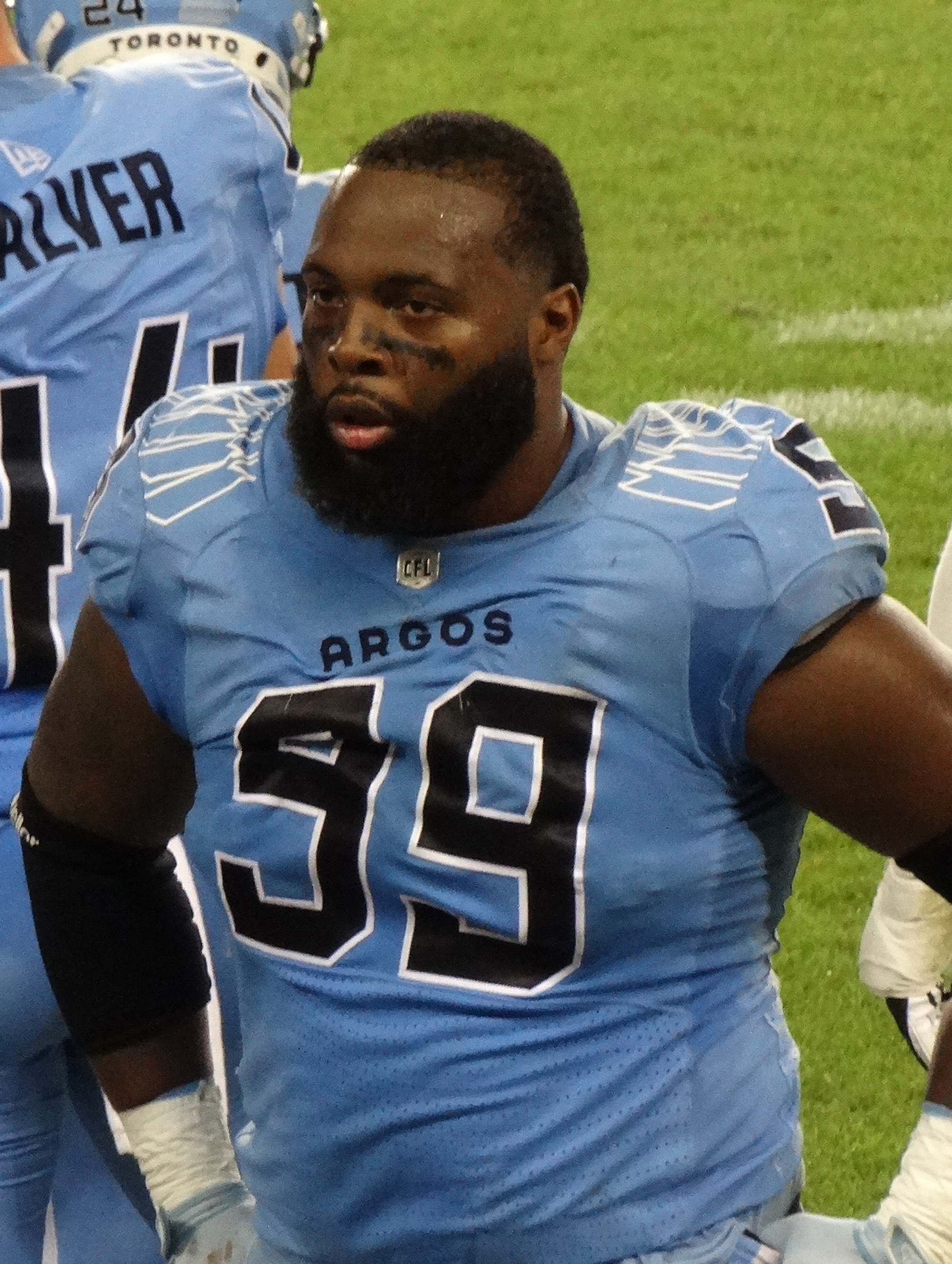
- Holley with the Toronto Argonauts in 2024

No. 99 – Toronto Argonauts
- Position: Defensive tackle
- Roster status: Active
- CFL status: American

Personal information
- Born: January 22, 1999 (age 27); West Bloomfield, Michigan, U.S.
- Listed height: 6 ft 1 in (1.85 m)
- Listed weight: 285 lb (129 kg)

Career information
- High school: St. Mary's Preparatory
- College: Western Michigan
- NFL draft: 2022: undrafted

Career history
- Philadelphia Stars (2022–2023); Toronto Argonauts (2023–2024); Cleveland Browns (2025)*; Toronto Argonauts (2026–present)
- * Offseason or practice squad member only

Awards and highlights
- Grey Cup champion (2024); CFL East All-Star (2026); First-team All-MAC (2020); Second-team All-MAC (2021)
- Stats at Pro Football Reference

Ralph Holley (born January 22, 1999) is an American professional football defensive tackle for the Toronto Argonauts of the Canadian Football League (CFL). In 2024, he won the Grey Cup championship with the Argonauts.

== College career ==
Holley played college football for the Western Michigan Broncos from 2017 to 2021. He played in 50 games where he had 138 tackles, 45.5 tackles for loss, 20.5 sacks, two forced fumbles, and one fumble recovery.

== Professional career ==
Pre-draft measurables
Height	Weight	Arm length	Hand span	Wingspan	40-yard dash	10-yard split	20-yard split	20-yard shuttle	Three-cone drill	Vertical jump	Broad jump	Bench press
6 ft 0 3/4 in (1.85 m)	297 lb (135 kg)	32 in (0.81 m)	9 1/8 in (0.23 m)	6 ft 5 3/8 in (1.97 m)	4.99 s	1.73 s	2.92 s	4.67 s	7.53 s	30.0 in (0.76 m)	8 ft 10 in (2.69 m)	24 reps
All values from Pro Day

=== Philadelphia Stars ===
After going unsigned in the National Football League following the 2022 NFL draft, Holley played for the Philadelphia Stars in 2023 where he played in three games and recorded three tackles.

=== Toronto Argonauts (first stint) ===
On October 22, 2023, it was announced that Holley had signed with the Toronto Argonauts. He didn't dress for a game in 2023, but was retained for the following season. At the conclusion of training camp in 2024, Holley accepted a practice roster position, but soon after made his CFL debut in the team's second game of the season on June 22, 2024, against the Edmonton Elks where he had one defensive tackle.

In the 2024 season, Holley played in 16 regular season games, starting in 12, where he had 22 defensive tackles, eight sacks, and one forced fumble. He also played and started in all three post-season games, including the 111th Grey Cup where he didn't record a statistic, but shared in the Argonauts' 41–24 victory over the Winnipeg Blue Bombers.

=== Cleveland Browns ===
On January 13, 2025, Holley signed with the Cleveland Browns of the National Football League. He was waived by the Browns on August 24. On August 27, Holley was signed to the practice squad. He was released on September 16.

=== Toronto Argonauts (second stint) ===
Holley signed with the Argonauts again on November 21, 2025.

== Personal life ==
Holley was born to parents Melonee and Ralph Holley.
