= Jamal Peters =

American gridiron football player (born 1996)

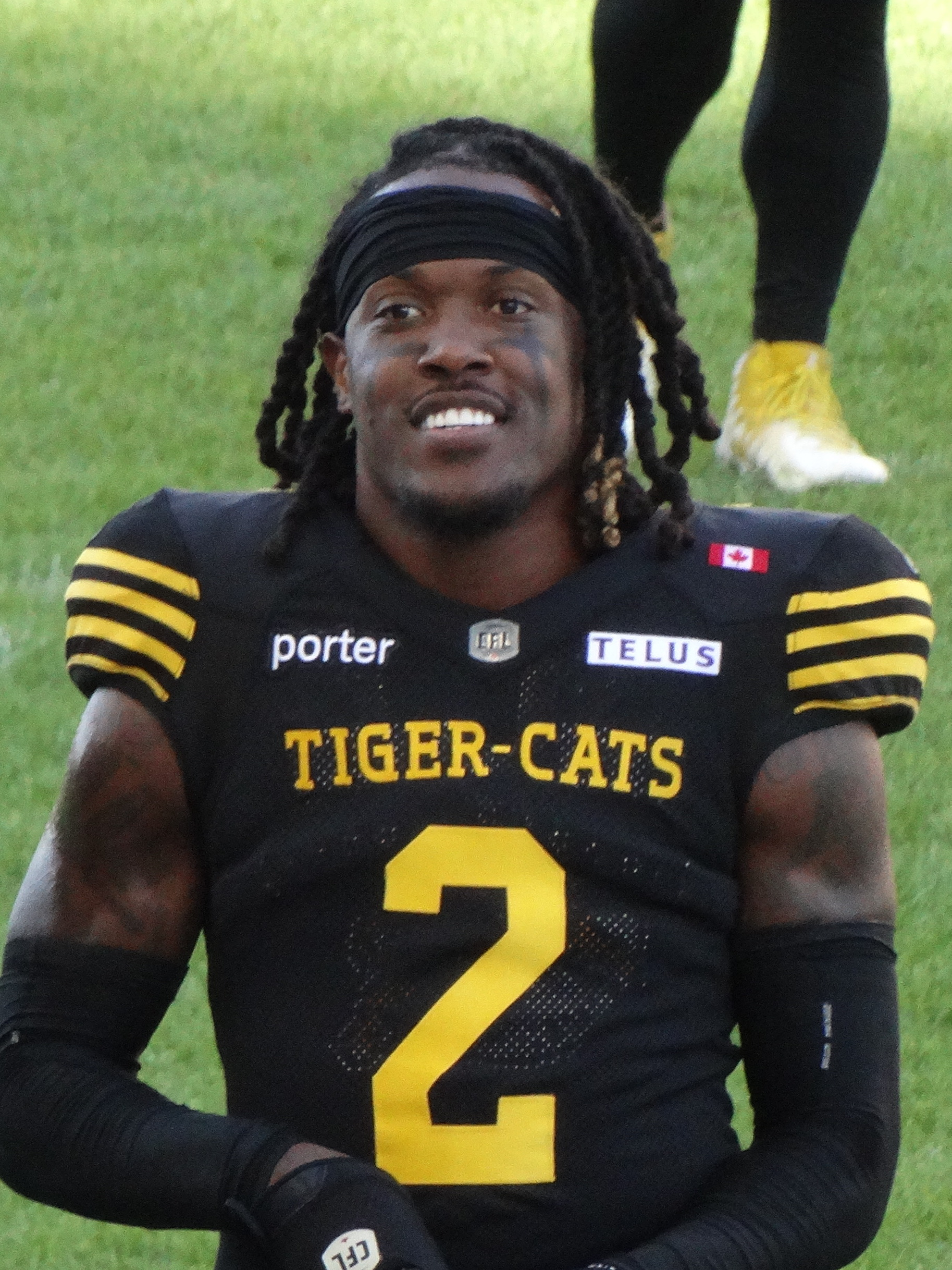
- Peters with the Hamilton Tiger-Cats in 2025

No. 2 – Hamilton Tiger-Cats
- Position: Defensive back
- Roster status: Active
- CFL status: American

Personal information
- Born: December 22, 1996 (age 29); Hattiesburg, Mississippi, U.S.
- Listed height: 6 ft 2 in (1.88 m)
- Listed weight: 220 lb (100 kg)

Career information
- High school: Bassfield (MS)
- College: Mississippi State
- NFL draft: 2019: undrafted

Career history
- Indianapolis Colts (2019)*; Toronto Argonauts (2021–2022); Atlanta Falcons (2023)*; Toronto Argonauts (2023); Hamilton Tiger-Cats (2024–present)
- * Offseason or practice squad member only

Awards and highlights
- Grey Cup champion (2022); 2× CFL All-Star (2022, 2025); 3× CFL East All-Star (2022, 2024, 2025)
- Stats at Pro Football Reference
- Stats at CFL.ca

Quinn Jamal Peters (born December 22, 1996) is an American professional football defensive back for the Hamilton Tiger-Cats of the Canadian Football League (CFL). He played college football at Mississippi State.

== College career ==
Peters played college football for the Mississippi State Bulldogs from 2015 to 2018. He played in 46 games where he had 99 tackles, 3.5 tackles for a loss, three interceptions, one sack, and two forced fumbles.

== Professional career ==
Pre-draft measurables
Height	Weight	Arm length	Hand span	Wingspan	40-yard dash	10-yard split	20-yard split	Vertical jump	Broad jump	Bench press
6 ft 1 3/4 in (1.87 m)	218 lb (99 kg)	32 3/8 in (0.82 m)	9 3/4 in (0.25 m)	6 ft 5 5/8 in (1.97 m)	4.56 s	1.61 s	2.63 s	28.5 in (0.72 m)	9 ft 7 in (2.92 m)	10 reps
All values from NFL Combine/Pro Day

=== Indianapolis Colts ===
After going undrafted in the 2019 NFL draft, Peters signed with the Indianapolis Colts on May 4, 2019. However, he was released following an injury settlement on May 14, 2019.

=== Toronto Argonauts (first stint) ===
Peters remained unsigned in 2020 and was eventually signed by the Toronto Argonauts on February 2, 2021. He began the 2021 season on the practice roster, but was elevated to the active roster in Week 2 and played in his first career professional game on August 13, 2021, where he had nine tackles and one interception against the Winnipeg Blue Bombers. He remained a starter on defence until he suffered a knee injury in Week 10. He sat out for the remainder of the regular season, but had played in eight games and recorded 31 defensive tackles and one interception until that point. Peters returned to play in the team's lone post-season game in the East Final where he had one defensive tackle in the loss to the Hamilton Tiger-Cats.

=== Atlanta Falcons ===
On January 9, 2023, Peters signed a reserve/future contract with the Atlanta Falcons. He was released on June 5, 2023.

=== Toronto Argonauts (second stint) ===
On June 12, 2023, it was announced that Peters had re-signed with the Argonauts. He became a free agent in February 2024.

=== Hamilton Tiger-Cats ===
On February 13, 2024, the Hamilton Tiger-Cats announced that Peters had signed with the team. Late in the 2024 season, on September 24, 2024, he signed a one-year contract extension with the team.

== Personal life ==
Peters was born in Hattiesburg, Mississippi to Yashica Peters. He has one brother, Gerobe Jr.
