= Devodric Bynum =

American gridiron football player (born 1999)

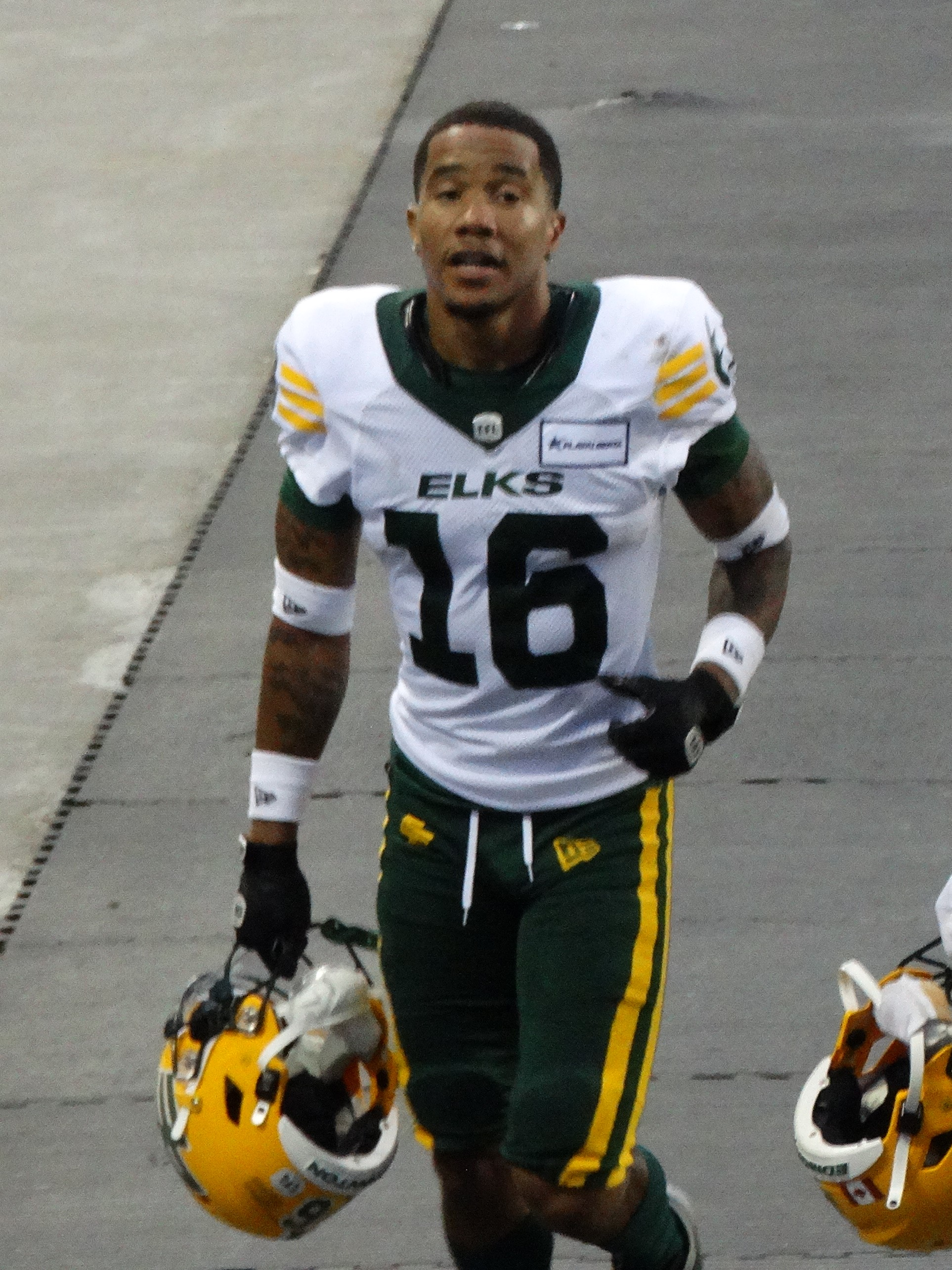
- Bynum with the Edmonton Elks in 2024

No. 20 – Hamilton Tiger-Cats
- Position: Defensive back
- Roster status: Active
- CFL status: American

Personal information
- Born: May 8, 1999 (age 27)
- Listed height: 5 ft 11 in (1.80 m)
- Listed weight: 186 lb (84 kg)

Career information
- High school: Lincoln (Dallas, Texas)
- College: UAB
- NFL draft: 2023: undrafted

Career history
- Edmonton Elks (2024–2025); Calgary Stampeders (2026)*; Hamilton Tiger-Cats (2026–present)
- * Offseason or practice squad member only

Career CFL statistics as of 2026
- Total tackles: 74
- Forced fumbles: 1
- Pass knockdowns: 10
- Interceptions: 6
- Stats at CFL.ca

Devodyric Bynum (born May 8, 1999) is an American professional football defensive back for the Hamilton Tiger-Cats of the Canadian Football League (CFL). He played college football at UAB.

== Early life ==
Devodyric Bynum was born on May 8, 1999. He grew up in a single-parent home in Dallas, Texas, with his mother and grandparents. He played high school football at Lincoln High School in Dallas. He played both offense and defense. As a senior in 2016, Bynum recorded 507 receiving yards, seven receiving touchdowns, 15 rushes for 200 yards and five touchdowns, 62 tackles, two interceptions, one forced fumble, and six combined kick/punt return touchdowns. In the class of 2017, he was rated a three-star recruit by both Scout.com and 247Sports.com, and the No. 27 wide receiver in Texas by Scout.

== College career ==
Bynum enrolled at the University of Houston to play receiver for the Houston Cougars in 2017. He was quickly moved to defensive back and redshirted the 2017 season.

Bynum played at Northeastern Oklahoma A&M College in 2018 as a free safety and returned one interception 76 yards for a touchdown. He also returned two kickoffs for 71 yards and two punts for 27 yards.

Bynum transferred to play cornerback for the UAB Blazers of the University of Alabama at Birmingham in 2019. He played in all 14 games, starting one, during the 2019 season, posting five solo tackles and one assisted tackle. In 2020, Bynum was arrested and charged with third-degree domestic violence. However, the charge was later dismissed. He was ordered to undergo drug testing and domestic violence education. Bynum appeared in all nine games during the COVID-19 shortened 2020 season, totaling 12 solo tackles, three assisted tackles, and four pass breakups. Bynum played in ten games in 2021, recording eight solo tackles, four assisted tackles, one sack, one forced fumble, and one pass breakup. He appeared in all 13 games as a redshirt senior in 2022, totaling 27 solo tackles, eight assisted tackles, 11 pass breakups, one sack, and one forced fumble. He was named the Conference USA Defensive Player of the Week for November 14 after making eight tackles (two for loss), two pass breakups, one sack, and one forced fumble in a 41–21 win over North Texas.

== Professional career ==
Pre-draft measurables
Height	Weight	Arm length	Hand span	Wingspan	40-yard dash	10-yard split	20-yard split	20-yard shuttle	Three-cone drill	Vertical jump	Broad jump	Bench press
5 ft 10 1/8 in (1.78 m)	183 lb (83 kg)	30 in (0.76 m)	9 in (0.23 m)	6 ft 1 1/8 in (1.86 m)	4.42 s	1.54 s	2.51 s	4.40 s	7.16 s	37.5 in (0.95 m)	10 ft 1 in (3.07 m)	15 reps
All values from Pro Day

=== Edmonton Elks ===
Bynum went undrafted in the 2023 NFL draft. He signed with the Edmonton Elks of the Canadian Football League (CFL) in January 2024. He was moved to the practice roster on June 12, promoted to the active roster on June 20, moved back to the practice roster on July 13, and promoted to the active roster again on August 2, 2024. Bynum played in 14 games, all starts, for the Elks during the 2024 season, recording 23 defensive tackles, five interceptions for 58 yards, four pass breakups, one forced fumble, four punt returns for 36 yards, and one kickoff return for 14 yards. On August 16, 2024, he was fined by the CFL for delivering a low block on a kickoff to David Mackie. He became a free agent upon the expiry of his contract on February 10, 2026.

=== Calgary Stampeders ===
On February 10, 2026, it was announced that Bynum had signed with the Calgary Stampeders. He was released on May 29.

=== Hamilton Tiger-Cats ===
On May 31, 2026, Bynum signed with the Hamilton Tiger-Cats.

== Personal life ==
Bynum's daughter was only one pound at birth. Bynum became baptised afterward, stating "she was in an incubator, I would go to the hospital after practice, long days, my faith grew." She later became heathy.
