= Brendan Bordner =

American football player (born 1999)

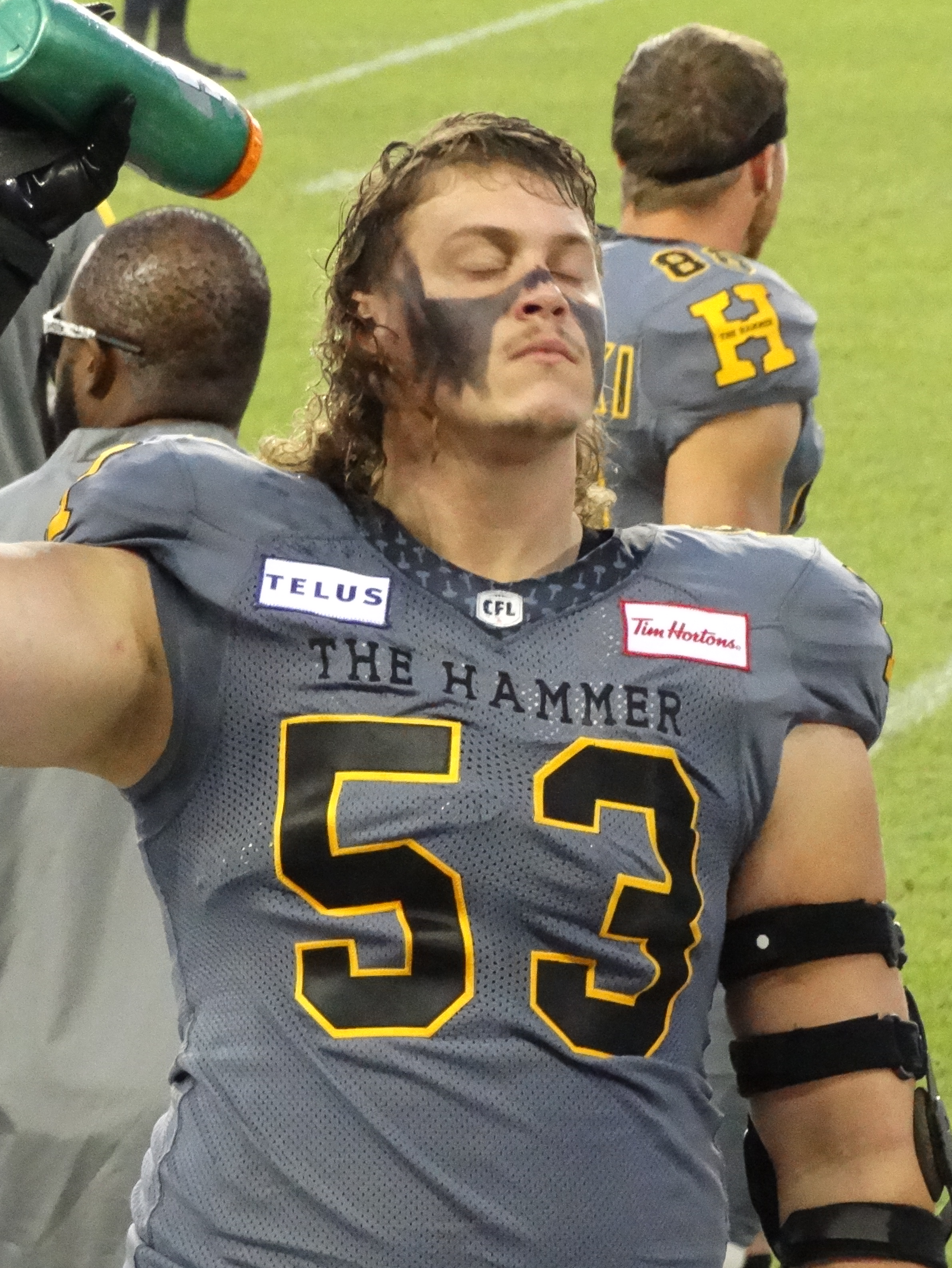
- Bordner with the Hamilton Tiger-Cats in 2024

No. 53 – Edmonton Elks
- Position: Offensive lineman
- Roster status: Active
- CFL status: American

Personal information
- Born: March 14, 1999 (age 27); Columbus, Ohio, U.S.
- Listed height: 6 ft 5 in (1.96 m)
- Listed weight: 305 lb (138 kg)

Career information
- High school: Hilliard Bradley (Hilliard, Ohio)
- College: Rutgers (2017–2021); Florida Atlantic (2022)
- NFL draft: 2023: undrafted

Career history
- Hamilton Tiger-Cats (2024–2025); Edmonton Elks (2026–present)

Awards and highlights
- Grey Cup champion (2026); Second-team All-Conference USA (2022)
- Stats at CFL.ca

Brendan Bordner (born March 14, 1999) is an American professional football offensive lineman for the Edmonton Elks of the Canadian Football League (CFL). He played college football at Rutgers and Florida Atlantic.

== Early life ==
Brendan Bordner was born on March 14, 1999, in Columbus, Ohio. He grew up an Ohio State fan. He played high school football at Hilliard Bradley High School in Hilliard, Ohio, as a defensive lineman. Bordner posted 47 tackles and 4.5 sacks his junior year, earning second-team All-Ohio Capitol Conference honors. As a senior, he helped the team to a 9–2 record and an Ohio Cardinal Division title win. He was a consensus three-star recruit in the class of 2017. He was rated the No. 2 defensive end prospect in Ohio by Scout.com.

== College career ==
In December 2016, Bordner committed to Rutgers University over offers from about 30 other schools. He enrolled at Rutgers in January 2017. He participated in spring practices and ended up redshirting the 2017 season. He appeared in eight games in 2018 and posted three solo tackles. Bordner played in all 12 games in 2019, recording six solo tackles and 14 assisted tackles. He earned Academic All-Big Ten honors for the 2019 season. He converted to offensive line in 2020. Bordner played in all nine games, starting three, during the COVID-19 shortened 2020 season and was named Academic All-Big Ten for the second straight year. He appeared in 12 games, starting five, his redshirt senior year in 2021.

In January 2022, Bordner enrolled at Florida Atlantic University as a graduate transfer. He had a sixth-year of college football eligibility due to the COVID-19 pandemic. He started all 12 games at left tackle for the Florida Atlantic Owls during the 2022 season, earning second-team All-Conference USA recognition.

== Professional career ==
Pre-draft measurables
Height	Weight	Arm length	Hand span	Wingspan	Vertical jump	Broad jump	Bench press
6 ft 4 3/8 in (1.94 m)	305 lb (138 kg)	32 in (0.81 m)	9 5/8 in (0.24 m)	6 ft 6 7/8 in (2.00 m)	25.5 in (0.65 m)	8 ft 3 in (2.51 m)	29 reps
All values from Pro Day

Bordner went undrafted in the 2023 NFL draft. On June 16, 2023, he was selected by the San Antonio Brahmas in the 2023 XFL rookie draft.

He signed with the Hamilton Tiger-Cats of the Canadian Football League (CFL) on January 16, 2024. He started 16 games for Hamilton during the 2024 season while also missing two games due to injury. Bordner garnered 3DownNation second-team All-CFL honors for his performance during the 2024 season.

The Edmonton Elks announced that they had signed Bordner on February 11, 2026.
