= Garry Peters (gridiron football) =

American gridiron football player (born 1991)

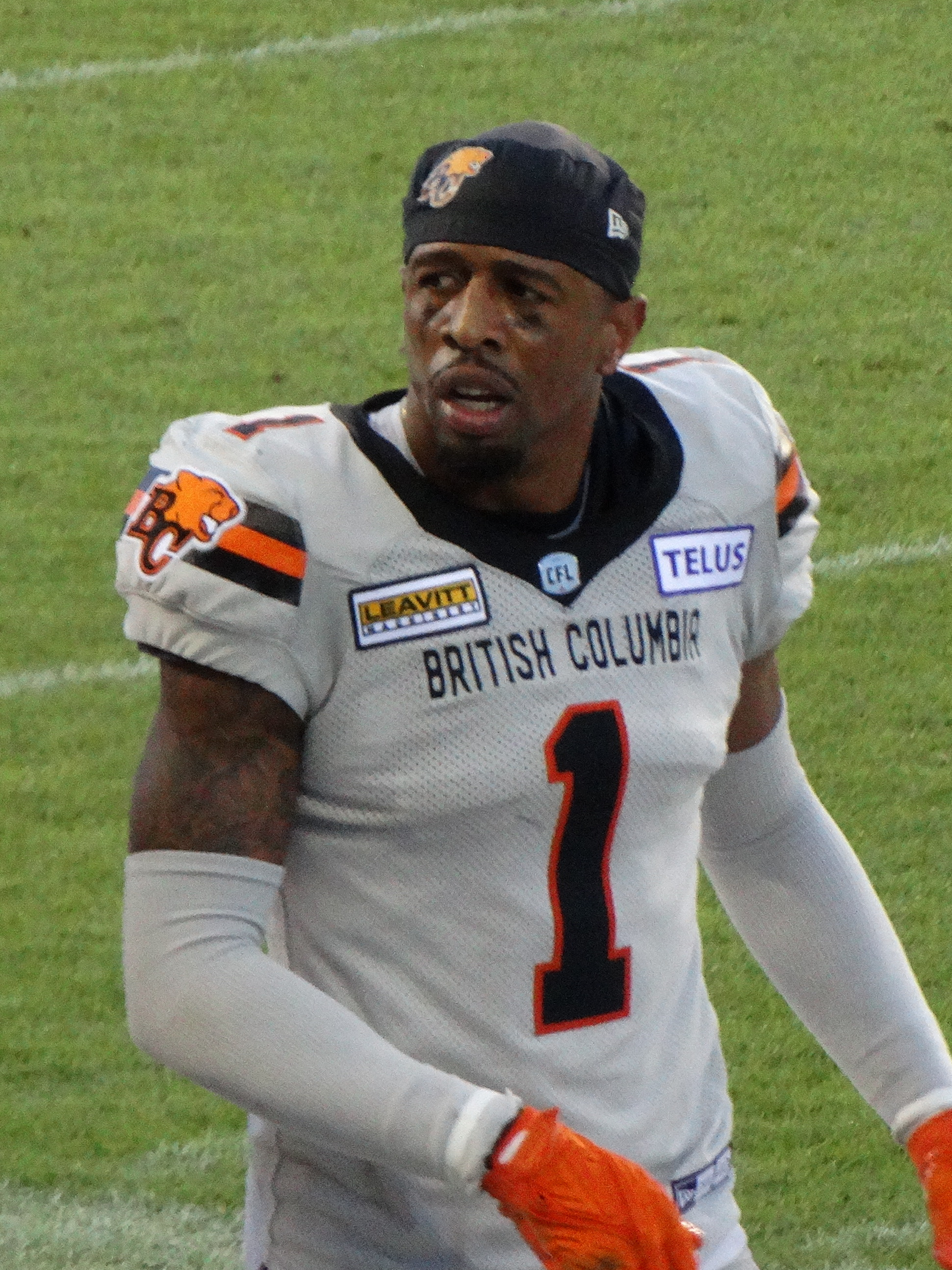
- Peters with the BC Lions in 2024

No. 1 – BC Lions
- Position: Defensive back
- Roster status: Active
- CFL status: American

Personal information
- Born: November 26, 1991 (age 34); Conyers, Georgia, U.S.
- Listed height: 6 ft 0 in (1.83 m)
- Listed weight: 200 lb (91 kg)

Career information
- High school: D. W. Daniel (SC)
- College: Clemson
- NFL draft: 2015: undrafted

Career history
- Carolina Panthers (2015)*; Edmonton Eskimos (2016–2017); BC Lions (2018–present)
- * Offseason or practice squad member only

Awards and highlights
- 2× CFL All-Star (2022, 2023); 2× CFL West All-Star (2022, 2023)
- Stats at Pro Football Reference
- Stats at CFL.ca

Garry Peters (born November 26, 1991) is an American professional football defensive back for the BC Lions of the Canadian Football League (CFL).

== College career ==
Peters attended Clemson University from 2011 to 2014, where he played college football for the Tigers. He played in 45 games, including 17 starts, where he had 106 tackles, two interceptions, two sacks, two forced fumbles, and one fumble recovery.

== Professional career ==
Pre-draft measurables
Height	Weight	Arm length	Hand span	Wingspan	40-yard dash	10-yard split	20-yard split	20-yard shuttle	Three-cone drill	Vertical jump	Broad jump	Bench press
5 ft 11 3/4 in (1.82 m)	191 lb (87 kg)	31 1/2 in (0.80 m)	10 in (0.25 m)	6 ft 5 1/8 in (1.96 m)	4.60 s	1.59 s	2.68 s	4.00 s	6.80 s	32.5 in (0.83 m)	9 ft 11 in (3.02 m)	7 reps
All values from NFL Combine/Pro Day

=== Carolina Panthers ===
Peters was signed as an undrafted free agent on May 8, 2015, by the Carolina Panthers of the National Football League (NFL) after going undrafted in the 2015 NFL draft. However, he was released prior to the start of preseason on July 30, 2015.

=== Edmonton Eskimos ===
Peters signed with the Edmonton Eskimos on May 29, 2016. He made the team's active roster following training camp and made his professional debut on June 25, 2016, against the Ottawa Redblacks. After spending time on the injured list, he played in 11 regular season games with the team and had 24 defensive tackles and five special teams tackles.

In 2017, Peters was suspended for one game after making physical contact with an official during a game against the Hamilton Tiger-Cats. His season was also limited by injury and he played in just eight regular season games where he had 35 defensive tackles and three special teams tackles. He became a free agent upon the expiry of his contract on February 13, 2018.

=== BC Lions ===
On February 13, 2018, Peters signed with the BC Lions. He played in all 18 regular season games where he had a career-high 73 defensive tackles to go along with two interceptions, one sack, and one forced fumble. In 2019, Peters again played in all 18 games and had 63 defensive tackles, four interceptions, and one forced fumble. He signed a two-year contract extension on February 11, 2020, but did not play that year due to the cancellation of the 2020 CFL season.

In a shortened 2021 season, Peters played in all 14 regular season games where he recorded 46 defensive tackles and four special teams tackles. As a pending free agent, he signed a contract extension on February 1, 2022. He played in all 18 regular season games in 2022, where he had 44 defensive tackles, three special team tackles, and five interceptions and was named a CFL All-Star for the first time in his career.

In 2023, Peters had 51 defensive tackles, two special teams tackles, and four interceptions in 18 regular season games. At the end of the season, he was again named a CFL All-Star.

On January 13, 2025, Peters signed a one-year contract extension to remain with BC for the 2025 season.

On September 5, 2025, Peters was placed on the Lions' 1-game injured list. He rejoined the active roster on September 11, 2025. On October 25, 2025, Peters was again placed on the Lions' 1-game injured list, where he remained to end the 2025 CFL regular season. He rejoined the active roster on October 31, 2025, in advance of the Western Semifinal game of the 2025 playoffs.

On January 2, 2025, Peters re-signed with the Lions, on a one-year contract extension.

On June 12, 2026, Peters was placed on the Lions' 6-game injured list to start the 2026 CFL season. He rejoined the active roster on August 29, 2026. On September 11, 2026, Peters was again placed on the Lions' 6-game injured list. He rejoined the active roster on October 30, 2026, ahead of the Western Semi-Final. On November 6, 2026, Peters was placed on the Lions' 1-game injured list ahead of the West Final and he remained there to end the 2026 CFL season.
