= Mustafa Johnson =

American gridiron football player (born 1999)

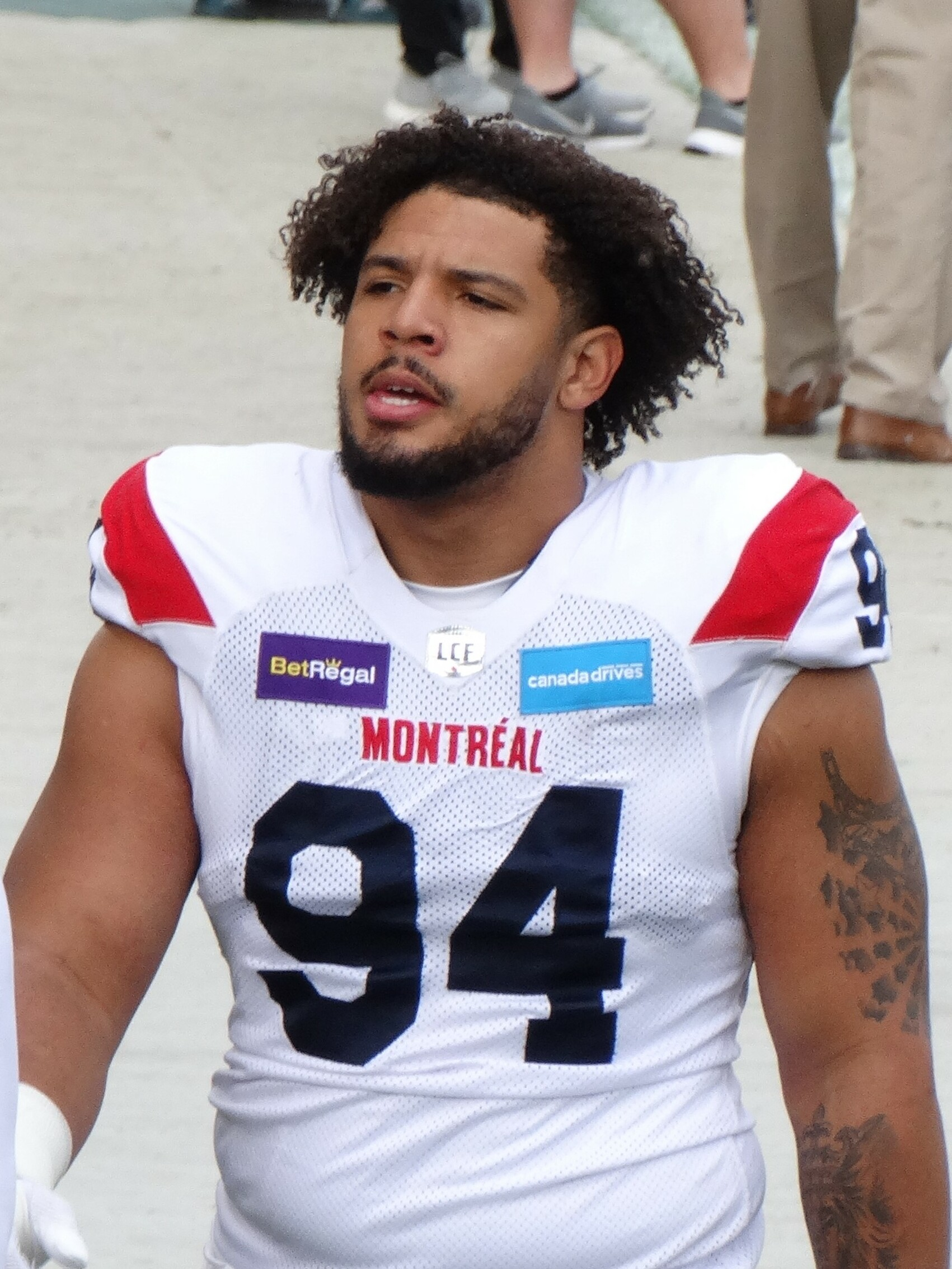
- Johnson with the Montreal Alouettes in 2022

No. 94 – Montreal Alouettes
- Position: Defensive lineman
- Roster status: Active
- CFL status: American

Personal information
- Born: February 16, 1999 (age 27); Aurora, Colorado, U.S.
- Listed height: 6 ft 0 in (1.83 m)
- Listed weight: 301 lb (137 kg)

Career information
- High school: Turlock High
- College: Colorado; Modesto

Career history
- 2022–present: Montreal Alouettes

Awards and highlights
- Grey Cup champion (2023); 2x CFL East All-Star (2023, 2026)
- Stats at Pro Football Reference
- Stats at CFL.ca

Mustafa Johnson (born February 16, 1999) is an American professional football defensive lineman for the Montreal Alouettes of the Canadian Football League (CFL).

== College career ==
Johnson first played college football for Modesto Pirates in 2017. He played in 11 games where he had 58 total tackles, 6.5 sacks, and one forced fumbles. He then transferred to the University of Colorado Boulder in 2018 where he played for the Buffaloes. Following the 2020 season, Johnson declared for the 2021 NFL draft, despite having one year of college eligibility remaining. After going undrafted, he was granted an exception to return for his senior year in 2021.

== Professional career ==
Pre-draft measurables
| Height | Weight | Arm length | Hand span | Wingspan | 10-yard split | 20-yard shuttle | Three-cone drill | Vertical jump | Broad jump | Bench press |
|---|---|---|---|---|---|---|---|---|---|---|
| 6 ft 0 1/8 in (1.83 m) | 288 lb (131 kg) | 31 5/8 in (0.80 m) | 10 1/8 in (0.26 m) | 6 ft 5 1/2 in (1.97 m) | 1.76 s | 4.53 s | 7.19 s | 29.0 in (0.74 m) | 8 ft 7 in (2.62 m) | 29 reps |
All values from Pro Day

On July 31, 2022, it was announced that Johnson had signed a practice roster agreement with the Montreal Alouettes. He later played and started in his first professional game on September 9, 2022, against the BC Lions where he had two defensive tackles and two sacks. He played in eight regular season games where he had 18 defensive tackles and two sacks.

In 2023, Johnson played in all 18 regular season games where he had 43 defensive tackles and seven sacks. He also had one fumble recovery on October 14, 2023, against the Edmonton Elks, that he returned for his first career touchdown. At the end of the year, he was named an East Division All-Star for the first time in his career.
