= James Letcher Jr. =

American gridiron football player (born 1999)

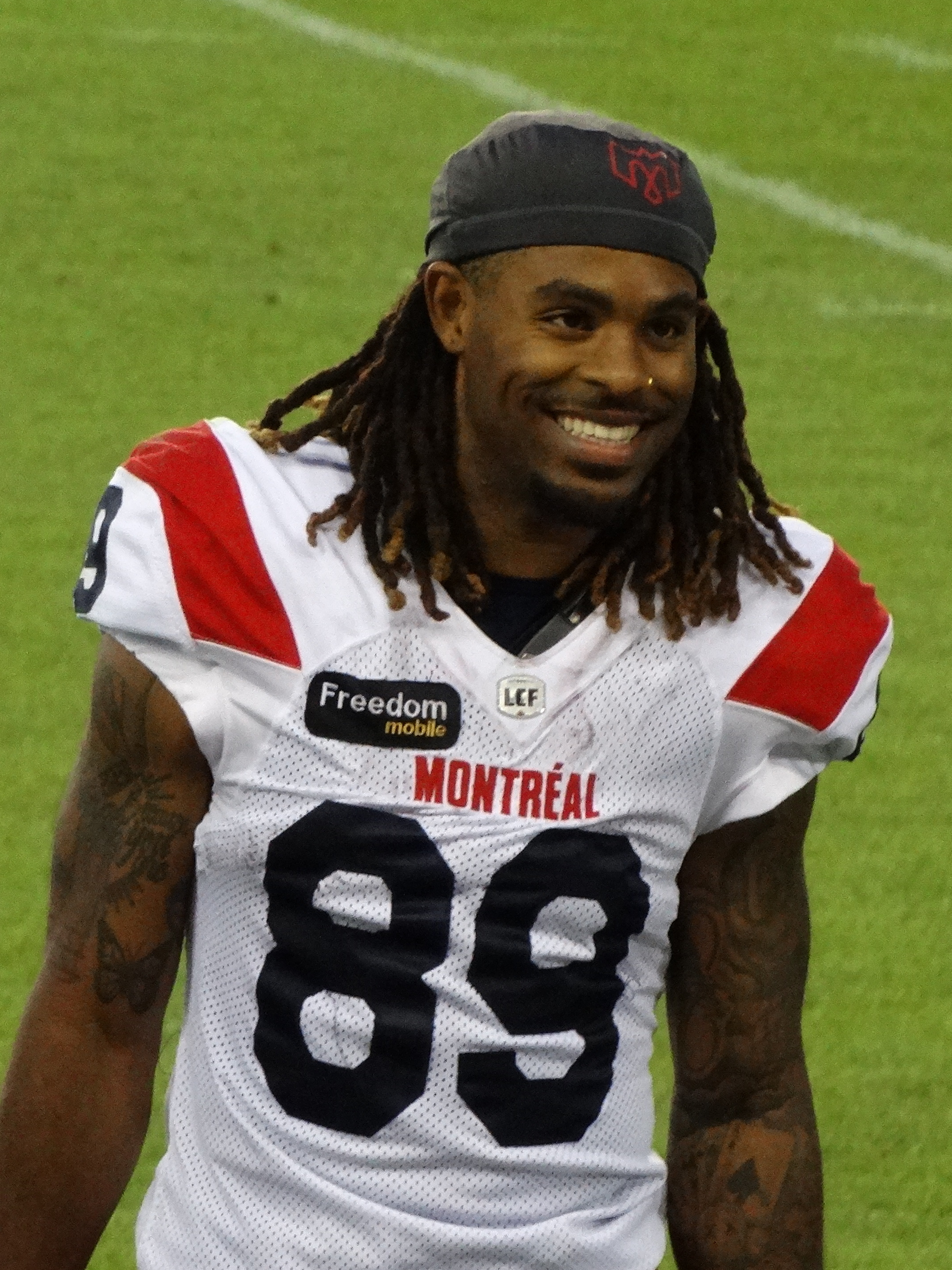
- Letcher Jr. with the Montreal Alouettes in 2024

Saskatchewan Roughriders
- Positions: Wide receiver, kick returner
- Roster status: Active
- CFL status: American

Personal information
- Born: July 21, 1999 (age 27); Kansas City, Kansas, U.S.
- Listed height: 5 ft 6 in (1.68 m)
- Listed weight: 180 lb (82 kg)

Career information
- College: Washburn (2017-2022)

Career history
- 2023–2025: Montreal Alouettes
- 2026–present: Saskatchewan Roughriders

Awards and highlights
- Grey Cup champion (2023)
- Stats at CFL.ca

James Letcher Jr. (born July 21, 1999) is an American professional football wide receiver and kick returner for the Saskatchewan Roughriders of the Canadian Football League (CFL).

== College career ==
Letcher played college football for the Washburn Ichabods from 2017 to 2022. He used a redshirt medical season in 2018 after suffering a season-ending injury after three games and did not play in 2020 due to the season being cancelled due to the COVID-19 pandemic. He appeared in 48 games, making 31 starts at receiver, where he had 228 receptions for 2,992 yards and 29 touchdowns. He also had three kickoff return touchdowns and two punt return touchdowns as he finished his career as Washburn's all-time leader with 5,623 all-purpose yards.

== Professional career ==
Pre-draft measurables
Height	Weight	Arm length	Hand span	Wingspan	40-yard dash	10-yard split	20-yard split	20-yard shuttle	Three-cone drill	Vertical jump	Broad jump	Bench press
5 ft 6 in (1.68 m)	168 lb (76 kg)	28 1/4 in (0.72 m)	9 in (0.23 m)	5 ft 10 1/2 in (1.79 m)	4.55 s	1.55 s	2.65 s	4.50 s	7.10 s	33.5 in (0.85 m)	9 ft 7 in (2.92 m)	13 reps
All values from Pro Day

=== Montreal Alouettes ===
On May 17, 2023, it was announced that Letcher had been signed by the Montreal Alouettes. Following training camp, he accepted a practice roster spot to begin the 2023 season as he was unable to surpass the team's incumbent kick returner, Chandler Worthy. However, Worthy was injured in week 16 and Letcher made his professional debut on September 30, 2023, against the Ottawa Redblacks, where he had five punt returns for 90 yards and two kickoff returns for 69 yards, including a long of 50 yards. Two weeks later, on October 14, 2023, Letcher returned a missed field goal 125 yards for his first career touchdown. In the team's final game of the regular season, on October 28, 2023, he returned a punt 99 yards for a touchdown in the 22–20 win over the Hamilton Tiger-Cats. He played in four games during the regular season where he had 23 punt returns for 392 yards and one touchdown, five kickoff returns for 109 yards, and one missed field goal return for 125 yards and one touchdown.

Letcher also played in both playoff games and halted a comeback from the Toronto Argonauts in the East Final when he returned a kickoff 105 yards for a touchdown to restore a three-score lead for the Alouettes en route to a victory and a berth in the 110th Grey Cup. In the Grey Cup game, he had three kickoff returns for 77 yards and two punt returns for negative five yards in the Alouettes' victory over the Winnipeg Blue Bombers.

Letcher was released by the Alouettes on February 2, 2026.

=== Saskatchewan Roughriders ===
On February 3, 2026, it was announced that Letcher had signed with the Saskatchewan Roughriders.

== Personal life ==
Letcher was raised by his parents Morris and Toyea Letcher.
