= Joshua Coker =

American football player (born 1997)

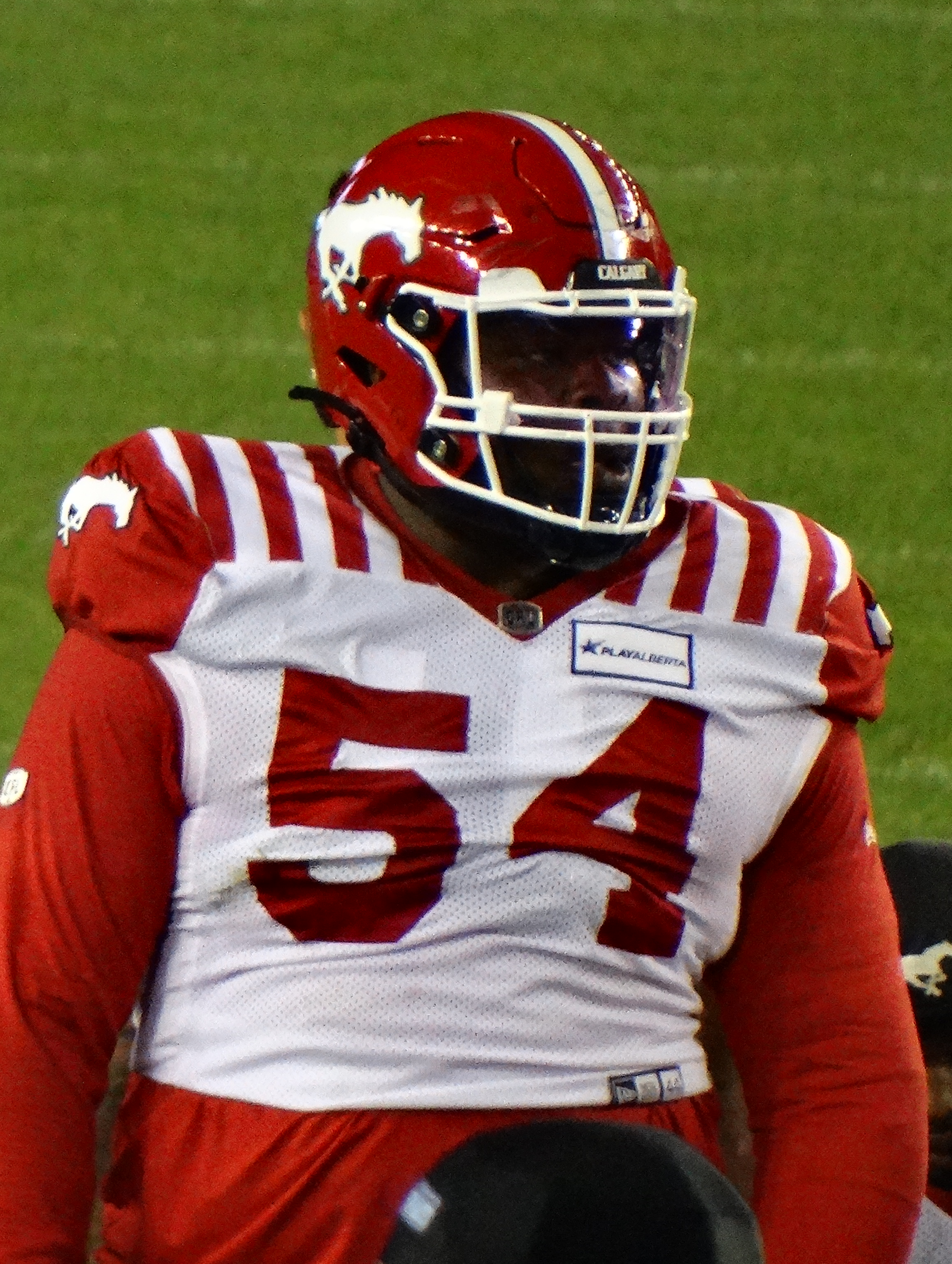
- Coker with the Calgary Stampeders in 2023

No. 58 – BC Lions
- Position: Offensive lineman
- Roster status: Active

Personal information
- Born: November 13, 1997 (age 29); Chicago, Illinois, U.S.
- Listed height: 6 ft 2 in (1.88 m)
- Listed weight: 310 lb (141 kg)

Career information
- High school: Greater Atlanta Christian (Norcross, Georgia)
- College: Rhodes (2015–2018)
- NFL draft: 2019: undrafted

Career history
- 2019: Houston Texans*
- 2020–2025: Calgary Stampeders
- 2026–present: BC Lions
- * Offseason or practice squad member only

Awards and highlights
- First-team All-American (2018); Second-team All-American (2017); 2× First-team All-SAA (2017–2018)
- Stats at CFL.ca

Joshua Oluwadara Coker (born November 13, 1997) is an American professional football offensive lineman for the BC Lions of the Canadian Football League (CFL). He played college football at Rhodes. He has also been a member of the Houston Texans of the National Football League (NFL) and the Calgary Stampeders of the Canadian Football League (CFL).

== Early life ==
Coker was a four-year letterman in both football and wrestling at Greater Atlanta Christian School in Georgia. He was the state wrestling champion in 2015.

== College career ==
Coker played college football for the Rhodes Lynx from 2015 to 2018. In 2017, he earned first-team All-Southern Athletic Association (SAA) and American Football Coaches Association (AFCA) second-team All-American honors. In 2018, he was named first-team All-SAA and AFCA first-team All-American.

== Professional career ==
Pre-draft measurables
Height	Weight	Arm length	Hand span	Wingspan	40-yard dash	10-yard split	20-yard split	20-yard shuttle	Three-cone drill	Vertical jump	Broad jump	Bench press
6 ft 1 3/4 in (1.87 m)	310 lb (141 kg)	33 5/8 in (0.85 m)	8 3/4 in (0.22 m)	6 ft 9 in (2.06 m)	5.15 s	1.79 s	2.95 s	4.45 s	7.38 s	27.5 in (0.70 m)	9 ft 1 in (2.77 m)	25 reps
All values from Pro Day

=== Houston Texans ===
After going undrafted in the 2019 NFL draft, Coker signed with the Houston Texans on May 10, 2019. He was waived on August 7, 2019.

=== Calgary Stampeders ===
Coker signed with the Calgary Stampeders of the Canadian Football League (CFL) on February 7, 2020. After the 2020 CFL season was cancelled due to the COVID-19 pandemic, he opted out of his contract on August 31, 2020. He re-signed with the Stampeders on January 6, 2021. He was released on July 21, re-signed on September 26, moved to the practice roster on September 30, and released from the practice roster on November 29. Coker did not dress in any games for the Stampeders during the 2021 season. He then signed a futures contract with the Stampeders on November 30, 2021.

During the 2022 season, Coker was moved between the practice roster, active roster, and injured reserve several times. Overall, he dressed in two games that season. He dressed in 12 games, starting 11, in 2023, and was placed on injured reserve twice.

Coker re-signed with the Stampeders on December 6, 2023. He played in 14 games (all starts) in 2024 and 15 games (all starts) in 2025. He became a free agent on February 10, 2026.

=== BC Lions ===
On May 4, 2026, Coker signed with the BC Lions. On May 10, 2026, Coker was placed on the Lions' 6-game injured list during the first day of the team's preseason training camp, and remained there for the entire 2026 CFL season.
