= Coulter Woodmansey =

Canadian gridiron football player (born 1997)

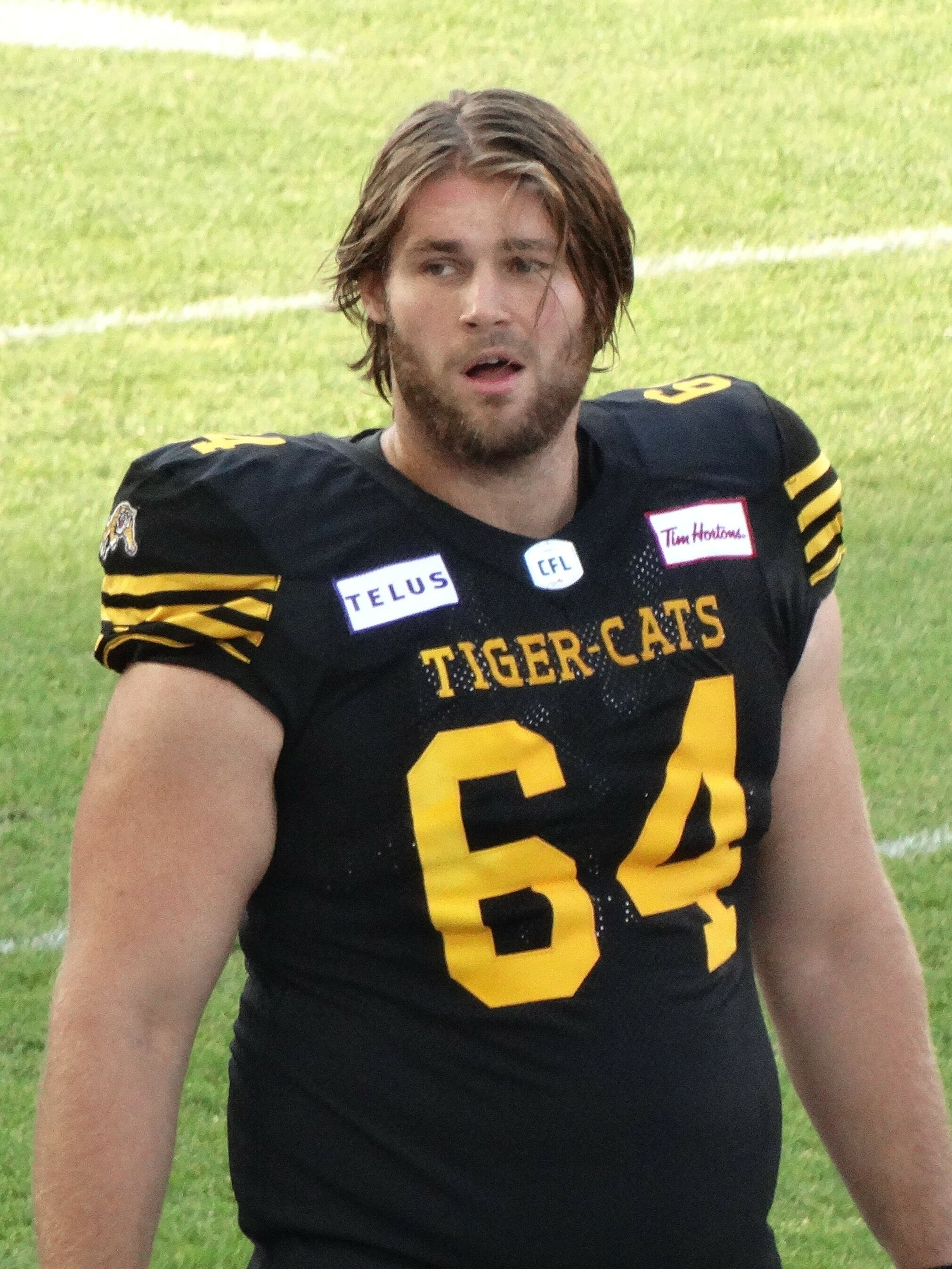
- Woodmansey with the Hamilton Tiger-Cats in 2023

No. 67 – Edmonton Elks
- Position: Offensive lineman
- Roster status: Active
- CFL status: National

Personal information
- Born: August 1, 1997 (age 29); Toronto, Ontario, Canada
- Listed height: 6 ft 4 in (1.93 m)
- Listed weight: 304 lb (138 kg)

Career information
- University: Guelph
- CFL draft: 2020: 1st round, 5th overall pick

Career history
- 2021–2025: Hamilton Tiger-Cats
- 2026–present: Edmonton Elks

Awards and highlights
- Grey Cup champion (2026)
- Stats at CFL.ca

Coulter Woodmansey (born August 1, 1997) is a Canadian professional football offensive lineman for the Edmonton Elks of the Canadian Football League (CFL).

== University career ==
Woodmansey played U Sports football for the Guelph Gryphons from 2016 to 2019, where he appeared in 32 regular season games, including 28 starts at guard, over the course of four seasons.

== Professional career ==
=== Hamilton Tiger-Cats ===
Woodmansey was selected fifth overall in the 2020 CFL draft by the Hamilton Tiger-Cats, but did not play in 2020 due to the cancellation of the 2020 CFL season. He then signed with the team on January 21, 2021. Woodmansey made the team's active roster following training camp in 2021 and played in his first career professional game on August 5, 2021, against the Winnipeg Blue Bombers. He earned his first career start on October 2, 2021, against the Montreal Alouettes.

=== Edmonton Elks ===
The Edmonton Elks announced the signing of Woodmansey on February 11, 2026.
