= 2020 CFL draft =

Canadian football draft

2020 CFL Draft

General information
- Sport: Canadian football
- Date: April 30, 2020
- Time: 8:00 pm EDT
- Location: Toronto
- Network: TSN/RDS

Overview
- 73 total selections in 8 rounds
- League: CFL
- Territorial pick: 2
- First selection: Jordan Williams, LB, BC Lions
- Most selections (10): Montreal Alouettes
- Fewest selections (7): BC Lions; Winnipeg Blue Bombers; Toronto Argonauts
- U Sports selections: 57
- NCAA selections: 16

The 2020 CFL draft took place on April 30, 2020, at 8:00 pm ET and was broadcast on TSN and RDS. 73 players were chosen from among eligible players from Canadian Universities across the country, as well as Canadian players playing in the NCAA. This was the second year in a row that featured territorial picks after they were re-introduced in the 2019 CFL draft.

The draft was broadcast live on TSN for two hours and then subsequent coverage shifted to digital platforms on CFL.ca. Due to the ongoing COVID-19 pandemic, every commentator broadcast from remote locations as opposed to in-studio. The TSN production was hosted by Farhan Lalji and featured the CFL on TSN panel which included Dave Naylor, Duane Forde, and Davis Sanchez. Randy Ambrosie, the CFL commissioner, delivered an opening remark and each selection in the first two rounds was announced by Lalji. Once the TSN production finished, CFL.ca host, Brodie Lawson, and CFL.ca columnist, Marshall Ferguson, covered all remaining rounds via an online broadcast on CFL.ca.

== Top prospects ==
Source: CFL Scouting Bureau rankings.

Final Ranking	December Ranking	September Ranking	Player	Position	University	Hometown
1	1	1	Neville Gallimore	Defensive lineman	Oklahoma	Ottawa, ON
2	2	2	Chase Claypool	Receiver	Notre Dame	Abbotsford, BC
3	4	11	Carter O'Donnell	Offensive lineman	Alberta	Red Deer, AB
4	5	13	Tomas Jack-Kurdyla	Offensive lineman	Buffalo	Montreal, QC
5	7	6	Dejon Brissett	Receiver	Virginia	Mississauga, ON
6	–	–	Michael Hoecht	Defensive lineman	Brown	Oakville, ON
7	3	3	Nathan Rourke	Quarterback	Ohio	Oakville, ON
8	–	–	Jordan Williams	Linebacker	East Carolina	Louisville, KY
9	9	15	Marc-Antoine Dequoy	Defensive back	Montreal	Île-Bizard, QC
10	8	9	Mason Bennett	Defensive lineman	North Dakota	Winnipeg, MB
11	6	7	Kétel Assé	Offensive lineman	Laval	Saint-Marc, Haiti
12	17	–	Isaac Adeyemi-Berglund	Defensive lineman	Southeastern Louisiana	Dartmouth, NS
13	10	14	Brendan O′Leary-Orange	Receiver	Nevada	Toronto, ON
14	15	–	Cameron Lawson	Defensive lineman	Queen's	Caledon, ON
15	13	8	Adam Auclair	Linebacker	Laval	Quebec City, QC
16	12	16	Dylan Giffen	Offensive lineman	Western	Strathroy, ON
17	16	19	Tyler Ternowski	Receiver	Waterloo	Hamilton, ON
18	11	–	Rysen John	Receiver	Simon Fraser	Vancouver, BC
19	20	–	Jack Cassar	Linebacker	Carleton	Mississauga, ON
20	19	12	J.J. Molson	Kicker	UCLA	Montreal, QC
–	14	18	Adam Sinagra	Quarterback	Calgary	Pointe-Claire, QC
–	18	20	Jesse Lawson	Offensive lineman	Carleton	Vancouver, BC
–	–	4	Sage Doxtater	Offensive lineman	New Mexico State	Welland, ON
–	–	5	Patrice Rene	Defensive back	North Carolina	Ottawa, ON
–	–	10	Daniel Joseph	Defensive lineman	Penn State	Brampton, ON
–	–	17	Dev Lamour	Defensive back	Buffalo	Montreal, QC

== Trades ==
In the explanations below, (D) denotes trades that took place during the draft, while (PD) indicates trades completed pre-draft.

=== Round one ===
- Montreal → Hamilton (PD). Montreal traded this selection, Jamaal Westerman, Chris Williams, and a first-round pick in the 2021 CFL draft to Hamilton in exchange for Johnny Manziel, Tony Washington, and Landon Rice.
- Winnipeg → Toronto (PD). Winnipeg traded a conditional first-round pick and a third-round selection in this year's draft to Toronto in exchange for Zach Collaros and a fifth-round pick in this year's draft. The condition was set upon Collaros re-signing with Winnipeg which was fulfilled on January 27, 2020, when he signed a two-year contract with the Blue Bombers.
- Ottawa → Calgary (PD). Ottawa traded the first overall selection to Calgary in exchange for the sixth overall selection when Nick Arbuckle signed a contract extension with Ottawa after his playing rights were traded by Calgary.
- Calgary ←→ BC (D). Calgary traded the first overall selection and 15th overall selection to BC in exchange for the third overall selection and 12th overall selection.

=== Round two ===
- Saskatchewan → Montreal (PD). Saskatchewan traded this selection and Joshua Stanford to Montreal in exchange for Philip Blake and Patrick Lavoie.
- BC ←→ Calgary (D). BC traded the 12th overall selection and third overall selection to Calgary in exchange for the first overall selection and 15th overall selection.

=== Round three ===
- Toronto → Montreal (PD). Toronto traded this selection and T. J. Heath to Montreal in exchange for Ryan Bomben and a fifth-round pick in this year's draft.
- Winnipeg → Toronto (PD). Winnipeg traded this selection and a conditional first-round pick to Toronto in exchange for Zach Collaros and a fifth-round pick in this year's draft.
- Ottawa → Calgary (PD). Ottawa traded this selection and a conditional first-round pick in this year's draft to Calgary in exchange for Nick Arbuckle and a conditional first-round pick in this year's draft.

=== Round four ===
- Toronto → Saskatchewan (PD). Toronto traded this selection to Saskatchewan in exchange for Zach Collaros. The pick can be upgraded to as high as a second-round pick in this year's draft if Collaros meets playing time targets and extension clauses.
- BC → Calgary (PD). BC traded a conditional fourth-round selection (which was fulfilled) and a negotiation list player to Calgary in exchange for Justin Renfrow and a fifth-round pick in this year's draft.

=== Round five ===
- Montreal → Toronto (PD). Montreal traded this selection and Ryan Bomben to Toronto in exchange for T. J. Heath and a third-round pick in this year's draft.
- Calgary → BC (PD). Calgary traded this selection and Justin Renfrow to BC in exchange for a conditional fourth-round pick in this year's draft and a negotiation list player.
- Toronto → Winnipeg (PD). Toronto traded this selection and Zach Collaros to Winnipeg in exchange for a third-round pick in this year's draft and a conditional draft pick that is contingent on Collaros re-signing with the Blue Bombers.

=== Round six ===
- BC → Montreal (PD). BC traded a conditional sixth-round selection (which was fulfilled) in this year's draft and a second-round selection in the 2019 CFL draft to Montreal in exchange for Tyrell Sutton and a third-round pick in the 2019 CFL draft.

=== Round seven ===
- Toronto → Edmonton (PD). Toronto traded a conditional sixth-round selection (which became a seventh-round selection) and Martese Jackson to Edmonton in exchange for a third-round pick in the 2019 CFL draft.

=== Round eight ===
- Toronto → Montreal (PD). Toronto traded a conditional eighth-round selection to Montreal in exchange for Boseko Lokombo.

=== Conditional trades ===
- Montreal → Saskatchewan (PD). Montreal traded a conditional eighth-round selection to Saskatchewan in exchange for Spencer Moore.
- BC → Toronto (PD). BC traded a conditional eighth-round selection and Davon Coleman to Toronto in exchange for Shawn Lemon.

== Forfeitures ==
- Saskatchewan forfeited their third-round pick after selecting Jake Bennett in the 2019 Supplemental Draft.

== Draft order ==
=== Round one ===
Pick #	CFL team	Player	Position	University
1	BC Lions (via Calgary via Ottawa)	Jordan Williams	LB	East Carolina
2	Toronto Argonauts	Dejon Brissett	WR	Virginia
3	Calgary Stampeders (via BC)	Isaac Adeyemi-Berglund	DL	Southeastern Louisiana
4	Edmonton Eskimos	Tomas Jack-Kurdyla	OL	Buffalo
5	Hamilton Tiger-Cats (via Montreal)	Coulter Woodmansey	OL	Guelph
6	Ottawa Redblacks (via Calgary)	Adam Auclair	DB	Laval
7	Saskatchewan Roughriders	Mattland Riley	OL	Saskatchewan
8	Hamilton Tiger-Cats	Mason Bennett	DL	North Dakota
9	Toronto Argonauts (via Winnipeg)	Theren Churchill	OL	Regina

=== Round two ===
Pick #	CFL team	Player	Position	University
10	Ottawa Redblacks	Michael Hoecht	DL	Brown
11	Toronto Argonauts	Jack Cassar	LB	Carleton
12	Calgary Stampeders (via BC)	Trivel Pinto	WR	British Columbia
13	Edmonton Eskimos	Alain Pae	DL	Ottawa
14	Montreal Alouettes	Marc-Antoine Dequoy	DB	Montreal
15	BC Lions (via Calgary)	Nathan Rourke	QB	Ohio
16	Montreal Alouettes (via Saskatchewan)	Cameron Lawson	DL	Queen's
17	Hamilton Tiger-Cats	Bailey Feltmate	LB	Acadia
18	Winnipeg Blue Bombers	Noah Hallett	DB	McMaster
19T	Ottawa Redblacks	Dan Basambombo	LB	Laval
20T	Toronto Argonauts	Samuel Acheampong	DL	Wilfrid Laurier

=== Round three ===
Pick #	CFL team	Player	Position	University
21	Calgary Stampeders (via Ottawa)	Rysen John	WR	Simon Fraser
22	Montreal Alouettes (via Toronto)	Carter O'Donnell	OL	Alberta
23	BC Lions	Courtney Hammond	DL	Western Oregon
24	Edmonton Eskimos	Malik Tyne	LB	Towson
25	Montreal Alouettes	Benoit Marion	DL	Montreal
26	Calgary Stampeders	Jonathan Zamora	OL	St. Francis Xavier
–	Saskatchewan Roughriders	Selection forfeited		
27	Hamilton Tiger-Cats	Tyler Ternowski	WR	Waterloo
28	Toronto Argonauts (via Winnipeg)	Dylan Giffen	OL	Western

=== Round four ===
Pick #	CFL team	Player	Position	University
29	Ottawa Redblacks	Jakub Szott	OL	McMaster
30	Saskatchewan Roughriders (via Toronto)	Kian Schaffer-Baker	WR	Guelph
31	Calgary Stampeders (via BC)	Kurtis Gray	LB	Waterloo
32	Edmonton Eskimos	Oludotun Aketepe	DB	Guelph
33	Montreal Alouettes	Brian Harelimana	LB	Montreal
34	Calgary Stampeders	Tyson Middlemost	WR	McMaster
35	Saskatchewan Roughriders	Junior Allen	LB	Guelph
36	Hamilton Tiger-Cats	Stavros Katsantonis	DB	British Columbia
37	Winnipeg Blue Bombers	Brendan O'Leary-Orange	WR	Nevada

=== Round five ===
Pick #	CFL team	Player	Position	University
38	Ottawa Redblacks	Terrance Abrahams-Webster	DB	Calgary
39	Winnipeg Blue Bombers (via Toronto)	Marc Liegghio	K	Western
40	BC Lions	Matt Guevremont	OL	Indiana (PA)
41	Edmonton Eskimos	Dante Brown	K	Fort Hays State
42	Toronto Argonauts (via Montreal)	Dion Pellerin	RB	Waterloo
43	BC Lions (via Calgary)	Cordell Hastings	WR	Acadia
44	Saskatchewan Roughriders	Vincent Dethier	DB	McGill
45	Hamilton Tiger-Cats	Joseph Bencze	DT	McMaster
46	Winnipeg Blue Bombers	Nicholas Dheilly	DL	Saskatchewan

=== Round six ===
Pick #	CFL team	Player	Position	University
47	Ottawa Redblacks	Brad Cowan	LB	Wilfrid Laurier
48	Toronto Argonauts	Samuel Baker	WR	Saskatchewan
49	Montreal Alouettes (via BC)	Andrew Becker	OL	Regina
50	Edmonton Eskimos	Chris Gangarossa	OL	Wagner
51	Montreal Alouettes	Jersey Henry	HB	Concordia
52	Calgary Stampeders	Andrew Seinet-Spaulding	OL	McGill
53	Saskatchewan Roughriders	Jonathan Femi-Cole	RB	Western
54	Hamilton Tiger-Cats	Jean Ventose	DB	British Columbia
55	Winnipeg Blue Bombers	Kyle Rodger	LB	Ottawa

=== Round seven ===
Pick #	CFL team	Player	Position	University
56	Ottawa Redblacks	Reshaan Davis	DL	Ottawa
57	Edmonton Eskimos (via Toronto)	Nicholas Summach	OL	Saskatchewan
58	BC Lions	Kayden Johnson	RB	York
59	Edmonton Eskimos	Rossini Sandjong	DE	York
60	Montreal Alouettes	Vincent Alessandrini	SB	Concordia
61	Calgary Stampeders	Keiran Burnham	K	St. Francis Xavier
62	Saskatchewan Roughriders	Jesse Lawson	OL	Carleton
63	Hamilton Tiger-Cats	J.J. Molson	K	UCLA
64	Winnipeg Blue Bombers	Tanner Cadwallader	LB	Wilfrid Laurier

=== Round eight ===
Pick #	CFL team	Player	Position	University
65	Ottawa Redblacks	Kétel Assé	OL	Laval
66	Montreal Alouettes (via Toronto)	Brock Gowanlock	DL	Manitoba
67	BC Lions	Damian Jamieson	LB	York
68	Edmonton Eskimos	Mitch Raper	RB	Carleton
69	Montreal Alouettes	Colton Klassen	RB	Saskatchewan
70	Calgary Stampeders	Michael Asibuo	CB	Concordia
71	Saskatchewan Roughriders	Neville Gallimore	DL	Oklahoma
72	Hamilton Tiger-Cats	Tom Schnitzler	LB/LS	British Columbia
73	Winnipeg Blue Bombers	Bleska Kambamba	DB	Western
