= Brian Harelimana =

Canadian gridiron football player (born 1995)

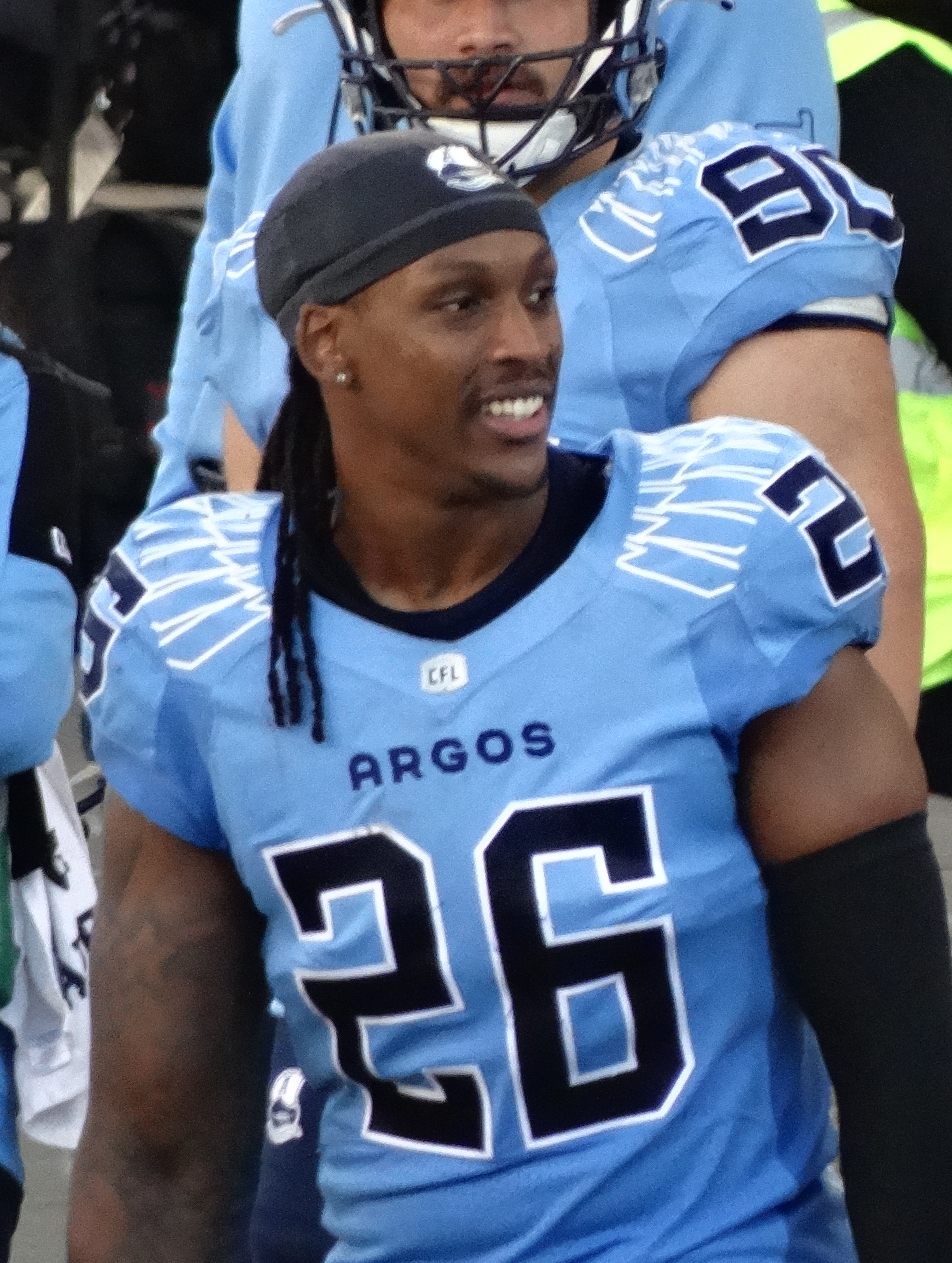
- Harelimana with the Toronto Argonauts in 2024

No. 26 – Toronto Argonauts
- Position: Linebacker
- Roster status: Active
- CFL status: National

Personal information
- Born: December 16, 1995 (age 30); Rwanda
- Listed height: 6 ft 0 in (1.83 m)
- Listed weight: 235 lb (107 kg)

Career information
- High school: Vanier High School
- University: Montreal
- CFL draft: 2020: 4th round, 33rd overall pick

Career history
- 2020–2023: Montreal Alouettes
- 2023: Saskatchewan Roughriders
- 2023–present: Toronto Argonauts

Awards and highlights
- Grey Cup champion (2024)

Career CFL statistics as of 2025
- Games played: 58
- Def tackles: 19
- ST tackles: 32
- Sacks: 3
- Stats at CFL.ca

Brian Harelimana (born December 16, 1995) is a Rwandan-Canadian professional football linebacker for the Toronto Argonauts of the Canadian Football League (CFL). He played U Sports football for the Montreal Carabins and was a fourth round draft pick by the Montreal Alouettes in 2020.

== Early life ==
Harelimana was born on December 16, 1995, in Rwanda. His family moved to Canada when he was young, and Harelimana attended Vanier High School. He played U Sports football for Montreal, ranking second on the team with 37 tackles in 2019.

== Professional career ==
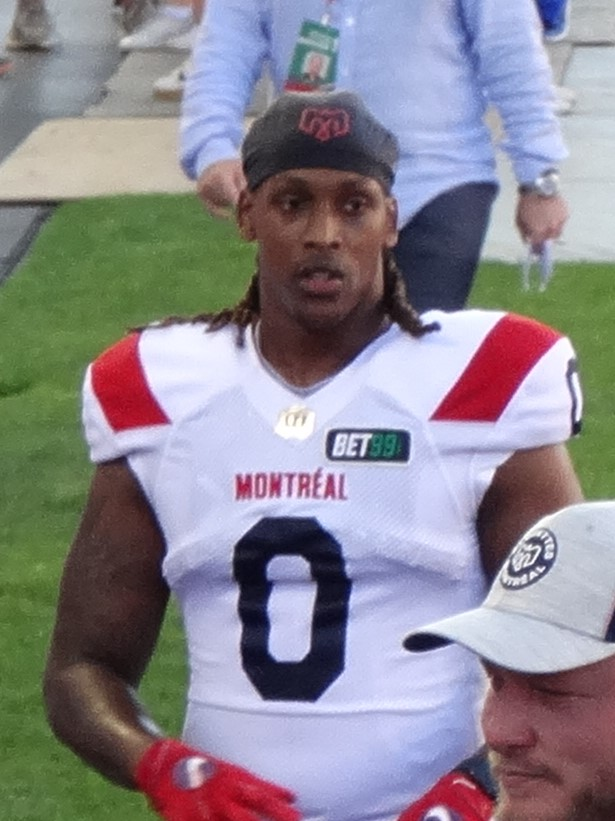
Harelimana with the Montreal Alouettes in 2022

=== Montreal Alouettes ===
Harelimana was selected in the fourth round (33rd overall) of the 2020 CFL draft by the Montreal Alouettes. The 2020 season was cancelled, but Harelimana returned to the team in 2021 and made the final roster. He appeared in eight games during the season, making five total tackles. He recorded two tackles on defense, three on special teams. In 2022, he played in all 18 regular season games, including three starts, where he recorded 12 defensive tackles, six special teams tackles, three sacks, and one forced fumble. He played in one regular season game with the Alouettes in 2023 before being released on June 17, 2023.

=== Saskatchewan Roughriders ===
On June 21, 2023, it was announced that Harelimana had signed with the Saskatchewan Roughriders. He played in 12 regular season games where he had four defensive tackles and four special teams tackles. At the conclusion of the Roughriders' season, Harelimana was released on October 29, 2023.

=== Toronto Argonauts ===
On October 31, 2023, Harelimana signed with the Toronto Argonauts. With the regular season over, he played in he team's East Final loss to the Montreal Alouettes. On February 1, 2024, it was announced that he had signed a contract extension with the Argonauts. In the 2024 season, Harelimana played in all 18 regular season games where he recorded one defensive tackle and 14 special teams tackles. He also played in all three post-season games, including the 111th Grey Cup where he didn't record a statistic, but shared in the Argonauts' 41–24 victory over the Winnipeg Blue Bombers.

== Personal life ==
His brother, Kean Harelimana, had a brief stint in the CFL with the Ottawa Redblacks.
