= Ken Evraire =

Canadian football player and journalist (born 1965)

Profile
- Position: Slotback

Personal information
- Born: July 17, 1965 (age 61); Toronto, Ontario, Canada

Career information
- University: Wilfrid Laurier
- CFL draft: 1988: 2nd round, 9th overall pick

Career history
- 1988–1990: Ottawa Rough Riders
- 1990–1994: Hamilton Tiger-Cats
- 1995: Ottawa Rough Riders
- 1996: Saskatchewan Roughriders
- 1997: Hamilton Tiger-Cats

Awards and highlights
- Lew Hayman Trophy (1992); CFL East All-Star (1992)

Ken Evraire (born July 17, 1965) is a former television journalist, host and former professional football league player. At present, Evraire is a keynote speaker/presenter (featuring The I in Team and Coaching Up is the only option" presentations), interim Executive Director at TGC Ottawa and pre/post game analyst for the Ottawa Redblacks on TSN 1200.

Football History - At the university level, he played as a slotback (SB), for the Golden Hawks of the Wilfrid Laurier University from 1985 to 1988. He was named three times in the Ontario University Athletics's first all-star team and twice in the Canadian Interuniversity Sport First All-Canadian Team. He was also named the OUA MVP in 1988 and the league's rookie of the year in 1986. In 1987, the Golden Hawks won the Yates Cup and was involved in a historic play in which he received a 106-yard pass that led the team to the Ontario championship. He was inducted in the Golden Hawks Hall of Fame in 1993. While playing football, he also earned at the same time a bachelor's degree in communications.

Evraire played nine seasons in the Canadian Football League for the Ottawa Rough Riders, Hamilton Tiger-Cats and Saskatchewan Roughriders. He spent seven years with Hamilton. In 1992, while with the Tiger-Cats, he won the Lew Hayman Trophy which is awarded to the most outstanding Canadian in the Eastern Division.

Following his career, Evraire worked until 2009 as a sports reporter at A in Ottawa and co-hosted along with Lianne Laing, Senators Primetime, a post-game talk show following each Ottawa Senators hockey game on A, generally on Thursday Nights.

In June 2009; he joined the CTV Ottawa as a weekend sports anchor following A's cancellation of evening and weekend newscasts at 6 and 11.

Beginning with the 2010 season, Evraire is the head coach of the Ottawa Invaders of the Northern Football Conference. In their inaugural season, he led the team to a 3-4-1 record. He coached the Invaders to 2 consecutive league finals and then launched RedZone7 Football. Evraire is married to Pamela Steeves and has 3 children (Elijah, Summer and Nate). Evraire has a cousin, named Chris Evraire who played in the CFL for Edmonton Eskimos and Ottawa Renegades.
