= Strathroy District Collegiate Institute =

Location
- 361 Second Street; Strathroy, Ontario, N7G 4J8; Canada; 42.981436°N 81.607327°W

Information
- School type: Secondary
- Founded: 1874
- School board: Thames Valley District School Board
- Principal: Kevin Wild (2026)
- Grades: 9–12
- Language: English
- Colours: Blue and Gold
- Team name: Strathroy Saints
- Website: www.tvdsb.ca/Strathroy.cfm

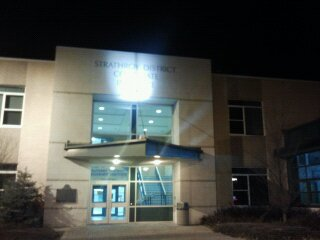
The front of SDCI

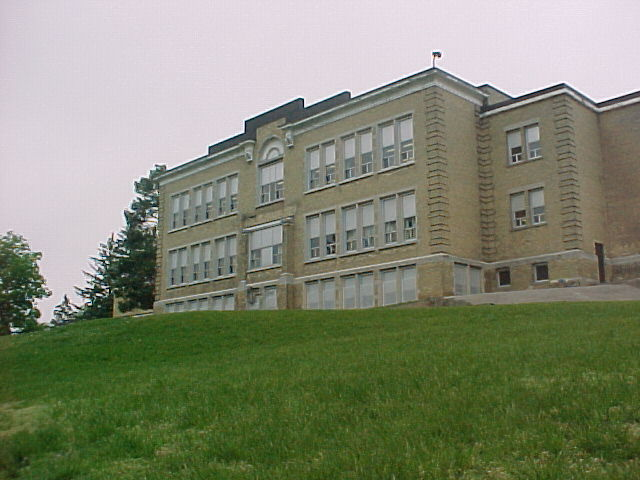
The old SDCI's back

Strathroy District Collegiate Institute (SDCI) is one of two secondary schools in Strathroy, Ontario. It is a public high school in the Thames Valley District School Board.

The school services feeder schools in the Strathroy area, as well as the outer regions such as Mt. Brydges, Parkhill, Kerwood, Coldstream, Poplar Hill, Glencoe, Delaware and Alvinston. A new facility was opened in the fall of 2002; it shares a building with the Holy Cross Catholic Secondary School. The two schools share some facilities, including the five gyms, the library, the cafeteria, the auditorium, computer labs, technology labs, and various other classrooms, while also maintaining completely separate schools.

== Notable alumni ==
- Brian Campbell – NHL defenseman for the Chicago Blackhawks; member of the 1999 Canadian World Junior Championships silver medal winning team and 2010 Stanley Cup champion
- Darryl Campbell – retired professional hockey player
- Dylan Giffen - CFL Offensive lineman for the Toronto Argonauts; Grey Cup Champion 2022,2024
- Max Campbell – 5th round NHL draft pick by the New York Rangers in 2007
- Sir Arthur Currie – Canadian general during World War I
- Chris Daw – gold medalist at the 2006 Paralympic Games in Turin, Italy in curling; 2000 Paralympic Games in Sydney, Australia in wheelchair rugby; 1988 Paralympic Games in Seoul, South Korea in track; only one of a handful to represent Canada at both Summer and Winter Paralympic Games. Daw was once considered the fastest wheelchair athlete in the world.
- Stephen Leacock – student teacher at the High Street campus of SDCI for three months in 1888 – see: "The Boy I Left Behind Me", S. Leacock (1936)
- Andy McDonald – retired hockey player. 2000 Hobey Baker Award finalist, NHL All-Star and 2007 Stanley Cup champion.
- Kris Pearn – story artist and conceptual artist at Sony Pictures Imageworks; formerly a conceptual artist and character designer at Fox Feature Animation Studios; career includes features such as Around the World in 80 Days, Titan A.E., Open Season, and Cloudy with a Chance of Meatballs. Kris also taught character design at Sheridan College in Oakville, Ontario
- Mark Shephard – 43rd round draft pick of the Los Angeles Dodgers in the 1994 draft
- James T. Shotwell – author of the Labour provisions in the Treaty of Versailles
- Janaya Stephens – film actress prominently featured in the Left Behind series of films as Chloe Steele

== See also ==
- Education in Ontario
- List of secondary schools in Ontario
