= Dion Pellerin =

Canadian football player (born 1998)

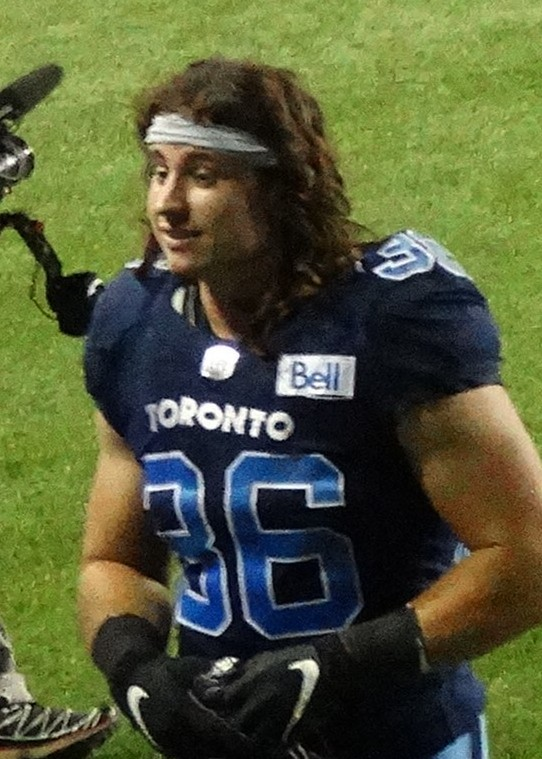
- Pellerin with the Toronto Argonauts in 2021

No. 36
- Position: Fullback

Personal information
- Born: March 11, 1998 (age 28); Abbotsford, British Columbia, Canada
- Listed height: 5 ft 11 in (1.80 m)
- Listed weight: 225 lb (102 kg)

Career information
- High school: W. J. Mouat Secondary
- University: Waterloo
- CFL draft: 2020: 5th round, 42nd overall pick

Career history
- 2021–2022: Toronto Argonauts
- Stats at CFL.ca

Dion Pellerin (born March 11, 1998) is a Canadian former professional football fullback who played for the Toronto Argonauts of the Canadian Football League (CFL).

== University career ==
Pellerin played U Sports football for the Waterloo Warriors from 2016 to 2019. He played in 32 regular season games where he had 2,304 rushing yards and 20 touchdowns, including 977 yards and 11 touchdowns in his senior year.

== Professional career ==
Pellerin was drafted in the fifth round, 42nd overall, in the 2020 CFL draft by the Toronto Argonauts, but did not play in 2020 due to the cancellation of the 2020 CFL season. It was then announced that he had signed his rookie contract with the Argonauts on March 22, 2021. Following training camp, he made the team's active roster for 2021 and played in his first career professional game on August 7, 2021, against the Calgary Stampeders where he had one special teams tackle. He had his first career reception on October 30, 2021, against the BC Lions where he also caught the game-winning two-point conversion in overtime, which were the first points scored of his professional career. He played in 14 games where he had two receptions for 11 yards and four special teams tackles. In the following year, he was released with the final training camp cuts on June 5, 2022.

== Personal life ==
Pellerin was born in Abbotsford, British Columbia to parents Karen Brown and David Pellerin. His father was a Regina native and fan of the Saskatchewan Roughriders and died when Pellerin was 16 years old.
