= Al Phaneuf =

Canadian gridiron football player (born 1944)

Profile
- Position: Defensive back

Personal information
- Born: February 4, 1944 (age 82); Almonte, Ontario, Canada
- Listed height: 6 ft 1 in (1.85 m)
- Listed weight: 191 lb (87 kg)

Career information
- College: Kentucky

Career history
- 1969–1971: Montreal Alouettes

Awards and highlights
- Grey Cup champion (1970); CFL All-Star (1970); CFL East All-Star (1970); CFL's (East) Most Outstanding Canadian Award (1970); Gruen Trophy – Outstanding Eastern Rookie (1969)

Al Phaneuf (born February 4, 1944) is a former defensive back in the Canadian Football League.

== College ==
Al Phaneuf played college football at the University of Kentucky. During his second year at Kentucky, Phaneuf "became a Christian." After graduating there, he attended Florida Bible College.

== Montreal Alouettes ==
Al Phaneuf played defensive back for 3 years with the Montreal Alouettes from 1969 to 1971, not missing a game, for a total of 42 games. Phaneuf's best year was 1970, when he intercepted 9 passes and was a CFL all-star. He was also and runner up for the CFL's Most Outstanding Canadian Award. That year, he played an important role in the Lark's Grey Cup victory by a score of 23-10 over the Calgary Stampeders by intercepting 2 passes.

In his rookie season, Phaneuf intercepted 4 passes and in his final one 3 more.

== Activities outside football ==
In October 1971, Phaneuf founded a Christian-based Youth Ranch for high school students on Montreal's West Island. In July 1972, Phaneuf surprised the Canadian football world by announcing his retirement after only three years of play without any injury, to devote more time to the Youth Ranch.
