= Rocky Dipietro =

Canadian football player (born 1956)

Rocky DiPietro
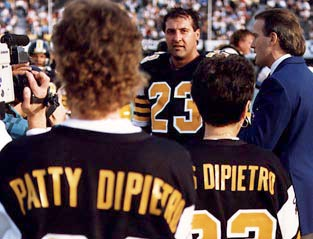

No. 23
- Position: Slotback

Personal information
- Born: January 30, 1956 (age 70); Sault Ste. Marie, Ontario, Canada
- Listed height: 6 ft 3 in (1.91 m)
- Listed weight: 210 lb (95 kg)

Career information
- University: Ottawa

Career history
- 1978–1991: Hamilton Tiger-Cats

Awards and highlights
- Grey Cup champion (1986); 2× CFL's Most Outstanding Canadian Award (1982, 1989); 3× Lew Hayman Trophy (1982, 1986, 1989); 2× CFL All-Star (1986, 1989); 4× CFL East All-Star (1981, 1982, 1986, 1989)

Rocky DiPietro (born January 30, 1956) is a former Canadian Football League (CFL) receiver for the Hamilton Tiger-Cats. During his 14-year career as a slotback and wide receiver, DiPietro became the CFL's all-time pass reception leader in 1989 and had a career total of 706 receptions for 9,762 yards and 45 touchdowns. DiPietro retired in 1991 after starring in four Grey Cup games, winning it in 1986. He was named to the Tiger-Cats Wall of Honour in 1994, and inducted into the Canadian Football Hall of Fame in 1997.

Rocky DiPietro Field

After a junior and senior football career in Sault Ste. Marie, DiPietro went on to an all-star CFL career. He was inducted into Canadian Football Hall of Fame in 1997 after playing for the Hamilton Tiger-Cats. He retired after the 1991 season with numerous awards and honours, which include: All-Eastern All-Star, All-Canadian All-Star, Most Outstanding Canadian Player Award, Lew Hayman Trophy — Most Outstanding Canadian Player Eastern Division, Grey Cup Participation, Grey Cup Championship Team and the Tiger-cats Walk of Fame.

He later became a high school Learning Strategies/Special Education teacher and coach of the multiple championship winning football team at Lakeshore Catholic High School in Port Colborne, Ontario.

His cousin Paul DiPietro was a member of the 1993 Montreal Canadiens Stanley Cup championship team and became an established star in Switzerland. Dipietro's nephew-in-law, Riley Sheahan, became an NHL player for several teams.

== Awards and honors ==
- Schenley Most Outstanding Canadian: 1982, 1989
- All-Canadian Slotback: 1986, 1989
- All-Eastern Slotback: 1981, 1982, 1986, 1989
- Lew Hayman Trophy: 1982, 1986, 1989
