= Dan Basambombo =

Canadian gridiron football player (born 1997)

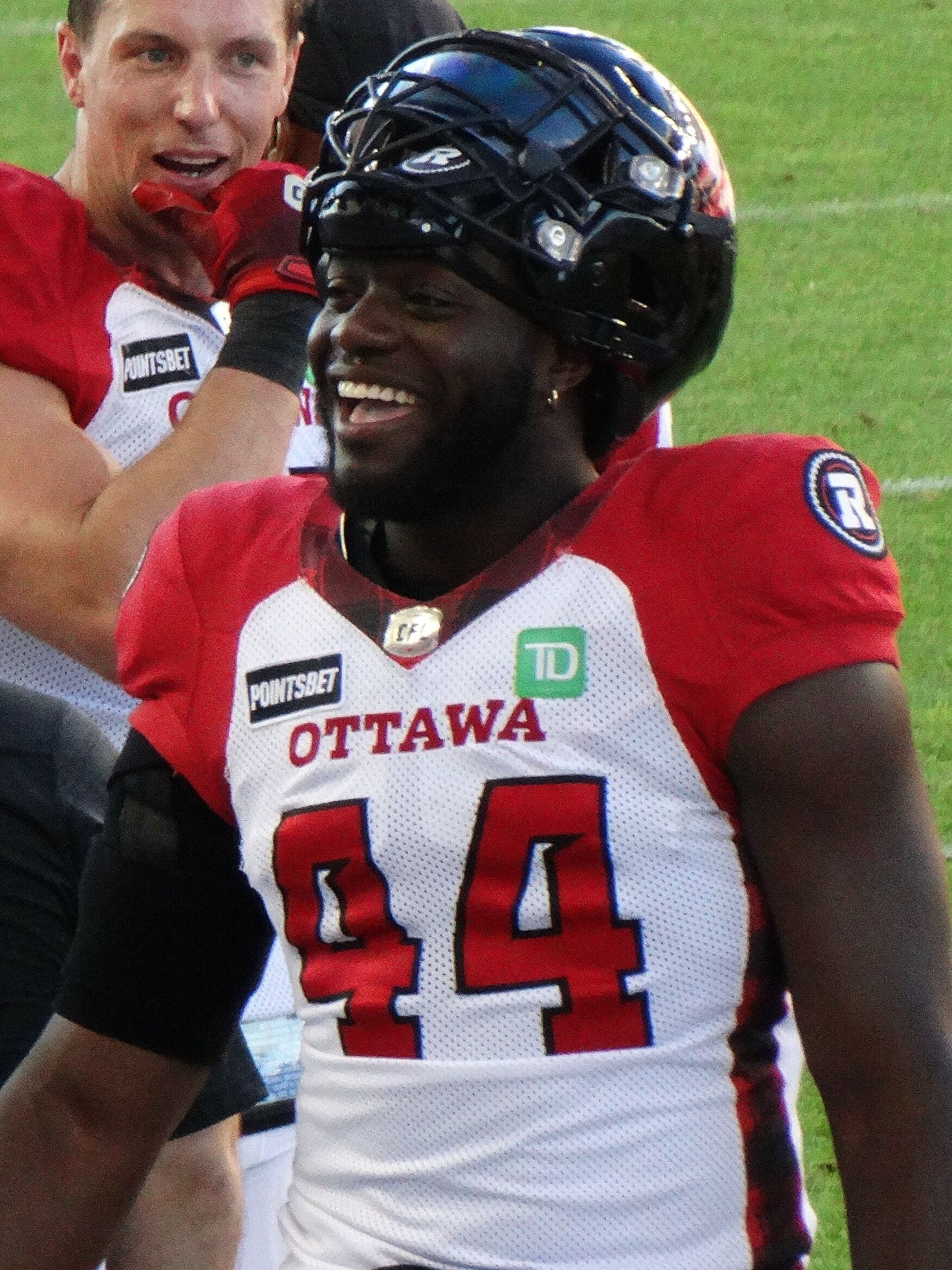
- Basambombo with the Ottawa Redblacks in 2022

Profile
- Position: Linebacker

Personal information
- Born: May 26, 1997 (age 29); Kinshasa, Democratic Republic of the Congo
- Listed height: 6 ft 0 in (1.83 m)
- Listed weight: 225 lb (102 kg)

Career information
- High school: École secondaire catholique Franco-Cité
- University: Laval
- CFL draft: 2020: 2nd round, 19th overall pick

Career history
- 2021–2023: Ottawa Redblacks
- 2024: Calgary Stampeders*
- 2024: Ottawa Redblacks*
- * Offseason or practice squad member only

Career CFL statistics
- Games: 23
- Def. tackles: 0
- ST tackles: 6
- Stats at CFL.ca

Dan Basambombo (born May 26, 1997) is a Congolese-Canadian professional football linebacker. He previously played for the Ottawa Redblacks of the Canadian Football League (CFL). He played U Sports football at Laval and was selected by the Redblacks in the second round of the 2020 CFL draft.

== Early life ==
Basambombo was born on May 26, 1997, in Kinshasa, the capital city of the Democratic Republic of the Congo. He grew up playing soccer before moving with his parents to Canada after he turned 9. Afterwards, he began playing badminton and lived in Ottawa, Ontario. He attended Franco Cite High School and was convinced to try out football by his friends after a time there. Basambombo was a member of his first team, the Canterbury Mustangs, starting at the age of 14 in 2011. He played for the Cumberland Panthers of the Ontario Varsity Football League (OVFL) in 2015, averaging five tackles per game.

== University career ==
Basambombo began attending Université Laval in 2016. He was the youngest player on their football team and was designated a "project." After seeing very limited playing time in his first two seasons, Basambombo became the starter at linebacker after an injury to Marc-Antoine Verin early in the 2018 season. In his second collegiate start, he posted 11 tackles and two quarterback sacks. Basambombo helped the team compile an undefeated 12–0 record while playing in eight games, as they won 34–20 in the 54th Vanier Cup. He finished the season with a total of 31.5 tackles and two sacks. In 2019, he sat out due to academic reasons.

== Professional career ==
=== Ottawa Redblacks (first stint) ===
Basambombo was selected in the second round of the 2020 CFL draft with the 19th pick by the Ottawa Redblacks, being a territorial selection from the area given to the Redblacks for being a last place team in the prior season. His rookie season was cancelled due to the COVID-19 pandemic. He signed a contract with the team in February 2021. That year, he saw limited action as a special teams player and appeared in five games. Basambombo's role increased in 2022, as he played in all 18 games and posted six special teams tackles. During 2023 training camp, he was placed on the six-game injured list with an undisclosed injury and was out for the entire season. He became a free agent after the 2023 season.

=== Calgary Stampeders ===
On September 9, 2024, it was announced that Basambombo had signed with the Calgary Stampeders. He remained on the practice roster until the end of the season and became a free agent on October 27, 2024, the day after the Stampeders' season ended.

=== Ottawa Redblacks (second stint) ===
Basambombo signed with the Redblacks to a practice roster agreement on October 28, 2024, in advance of the team's post-season game. Following the team's East Semi-Final loss, his contract expired and he became a free agent on November 3, 2024.
