= Lew Hayman Trophy =

Canadian sports trophy for Canadian gridiron football

The Lew Hayman Trophy is a Canadian Football League trophy, awarded to the outstanding Canadian player in the East Division. Each team in the East Division nominates a player, from which the winner is chosen. Either the winner of the Hayman trophy or the Dr. Beattie Martin Trophy will also win the Canadian Football League Most Outstanding Canadian award.

As part of the failed American expansion in 1995, the Hayman trophy was awarded to the Martin Trophy runner-up, as the South Division teams (to which other East Division titles were assigned to that year) did not have an import quota.

The trophy is named after Lew Hayman, former coach and general manager of the Toronto Argonauts and the Montreal Alouettes, as well as a past CFL president.

== Lew Hayman Trophy winners ==
- 2025 – Isaac Adeyemi-Berglund (DL), Montreal Alouettes
- 2024 – Isaac Adeyemi-Berglund (DL), Montreal Alouettes
- 2023 – Marc-Antoine Dequoy (DB), Montreal Alouettes
- 2022 – Kurleigh Gittens Jr. (WR), Toronto Argonauts
- 2021 – David Ménard (DL), Montreal Alouettes
- 2020 – season cancelled – covid 19
- 2019 – Henoc Muamba (LB), Montreal Alouettes
- 2018 – Brad Sinopoli (WR), Ottawa Redblacks
- 2017 – Brad Sinopoli (WR), Ottawa Redblacks
- 2016 – Andy Fantuz (SB), Hamilton Tiger-Cats
- 2015 – Brad Sinopoli (WR), Ottawa Redblacks
- 2014 – Ted Laurent (DT), Hamilton Tiger-Cats
- 2013 – Henoc Muamba (LB), Winnipeg Blue Bombers
- 2012 – Shea Emry (LB), Montreal Alouettes
- 2011 – Sean Whyte (K), Montreal Alouettes
- 2010 – Dave Stala (SB), Hamilton Tiger-Cats
- 2009 – Ben Cahoon (SB), Montreal Alouettes
- 2008 – Ben Cahoon (SB), Montreal Alouettes
- 2007 – Doug Brown (DT), Winnipeg Blue Bombers
- 2006 – Doug Brown (DT), Winnipeg Blue Bombers
- 2005 – Kevin Eiben (LB), Toronto Argonauts
- 2004 – Kevin Eiben (LB), Toronto Argonauts
- 2003 – Ben Cahoon (SB), Montreal Alouettes
- 2002 – Ben Cahoon (SB), Montreal Alouettes
- 2001 – Doug Brown (DE), Winnipeg Blue Bombers
- 2000 – Davis Sanchez (CB), Montreal Alouettes
- 1999 – Mike O'Shea (LB), Toronto Argonauts
- 1998 – Mike Morreale (SB), Hamilton Tiger-Cats
- 1997 – Jock Climie (SB), Montreal Alouettes
- 1996 – Michael Soles (FB), Montreal Alouettes
- 1995 – Dave Sapunjis (SB), Calgary Stampeders
- 1994 – Gerald Wilcox (SB), Winnipeg Blue Bombers
- 1993 – Gerald Wilcox (SB), Winnipeg Blue Bombers
- 1992 – Ken Evraire (SB), Hamilton Tiger-Cats
- 1991 – Lance Chomyc (K), Toronto Argonauts
- 1990 – Paul Osbaldiston (K), Hamilton Tiger-Cats
- 1989 – Rocky DiPietro (SB), Hamilton Tiger-Cats
- 1988 – Orville Lee (RB), Ottawa Rough Riders
- 1987 – Scott Flagel (DS), Winnipeg Blue Bombers
- 1986 – Rocky DiPietro (SB), Hamilton Tiger-Cats
- 1985 – Paul Bennett (DB), Hamilton Tiger-Cats
- 1984 – Nick Arakgi (SB), Montreal Concordes
- 1983 – Denny Ferdinand (RB), Montreal Concordes
- 1982 – Rocky DiPietro (SB), Hamilton Tiger-Cats
- 1981 – Tony Gabriel (TE), Ottawa Rough Riders
- 1980 – Gerry Dattilio (QB), Montreal Alouettes
- 1979 – Leif Pettersen (SB), Hamilton Tiger-Cats
- 1978 – Tony Gabriel (TE), Ottawa Rough Riders
- 1977 – Tony Gabriel (TE), Ottawa Rough Riders
- 1976 – Tony Gabriel (TE), Ottawa Rough Riders
- 1975 – Jim Foley (WR), Ottawa Rough Riders

== Outstanding Canadian player in the East Division prior to the trophy ==
- 1974 – Tony Gabriel (TE), Hamilton Tiger-Cats
- 1973 – Gerry Organ (K), Ottawa Rough Riders
- 1972 – Gerry Organ (K), Ottawa Rough Riders
- 1971 – Terry Evanshen (WR), Montreal Alouettes
- 1970 – Al Phaneuf (DB), Montreal Alouettes
- 1969 – Russ Jackson (QB), Ottawa Rough Riders
- 1968 – Whit Tucker (WR), Ottawa Rough Riders
- 1967 – Russ Jackson (QB), Ottawa Rough Riders
- 1966 – Russ Jackson (QB), Ottawa Rough Riders
- 1965 – Zeno Karcz (LB), Hamilton Tiger-Cats
- 1964 – Tommy Grant (WR), Hamilton Tiger-Cats
- 1963 – Russ Jackson (QB), Ottawa Rough Riders
- 1962 – Russ Jackson (QB), Ottawa Rough Riders
- 1961 – Bobby Kuntz (LB), Toronto Argonauts
- 1960 – Ron Stewart (RB), Ottawa Rough Riders
- 1959 – Russ Jackson (QB), Ottawa Rough Riders
- 1958 – Ron Howell (FW), Hamilton Tiger-Cats
- 1957 – Bobby Kuntz (LB), Toronto Argonauts
- 1956 – Bob Simpson (FW), Ottawa Rough Riders
- 1955 – Bob Simpson, Ottawa Rough Riders & Joey Pal, Montreal Alouettes
