= Brad Cowan =

Canadian gridiron football player (born 1998)

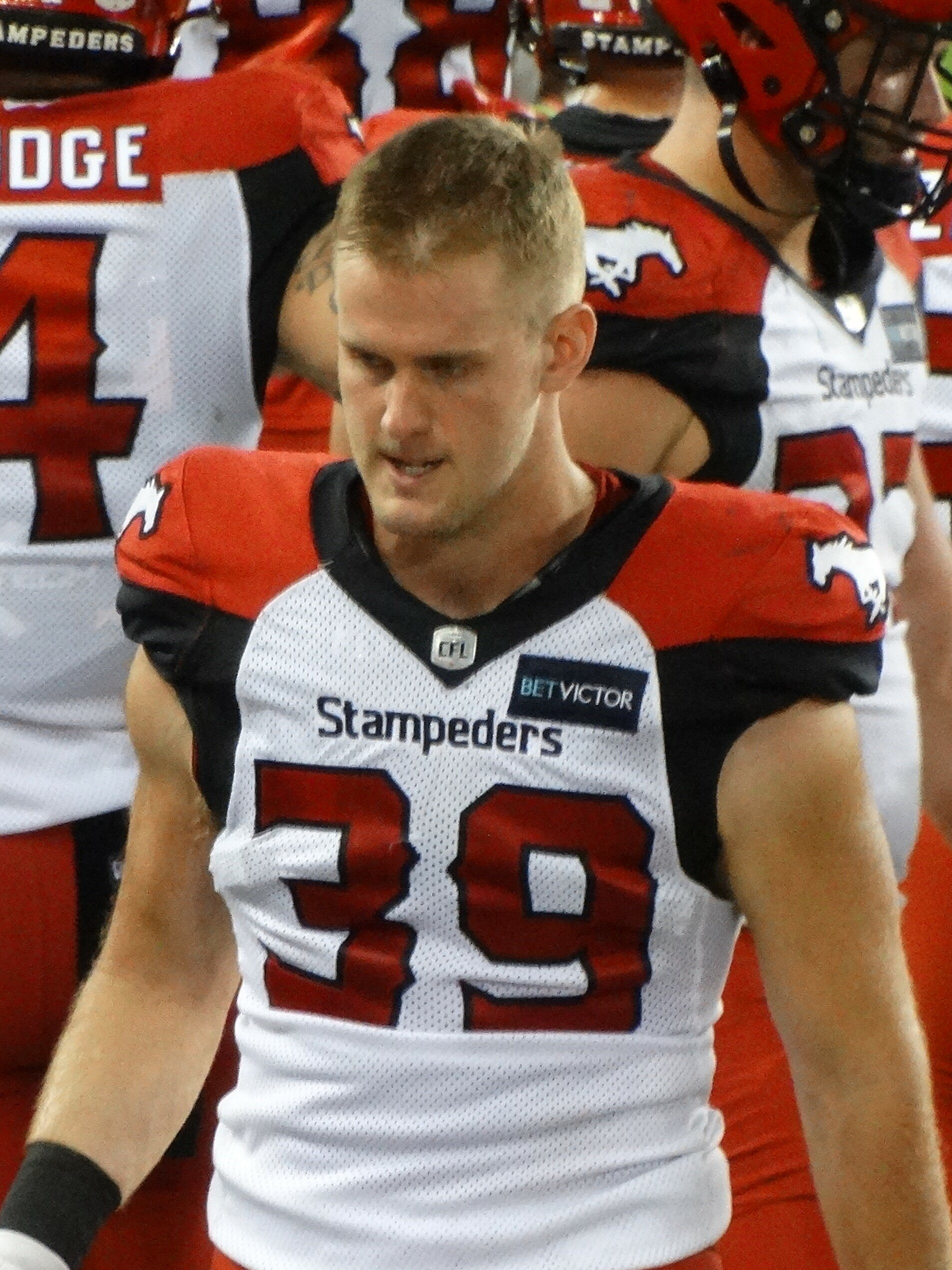
- Cowan with the Calgary Stampeders in 2022

Profile
- Position: Linebacker

Personal information
- Born: October 26, 1998 (age 28); Ottawa, Ontario, Canada
- Listed height: 6 ft 3 in (1.91 m)
- Listed weight: 227 lb (103 kg)

Career information
- High school: South Carleton High (ON)
- University: Wilfrid Laurier
- CFL draft: 2020: 6th round, 47th overall pick

Career history
- 2021: Ottawa Redblacks
- 2021–2023: Calgary Stampeders

Awards and highlights
- Yates Cup champion (2016)
- Stats at CFL.ca

Brad Cowan (born October 26, 1998) is a Canadian professional football linebacker. He has played for the Ottawa Redblacks and Calgary Stampeders of the Canadian Football League (CFL).

== University career ==
Cowan played U Sports football for the Wilfrid Laurier Golden Hawks from 2016 to 2019. In his first year, he was a backup while playing on special teams and was a member of the 2016 Yates Cup championship team. However, he sat out the 2018 season due to a wrist injury he suffered during the offseason. Cowan played in 23 regular season games where he had 84 tackles, 3.5 sacks, two pass breakups, and one forced fumble.

== Professional career ==
=== Ottawa Redblacks ===
Cowan was drafted in the sixth round, 47th overall, by his hometown Ottawa Redblacks in the 2020 CFL draft and signed with the team on January 15, 2021. However, he did not play in 2020 due to the cancellation of the 2020 CFL season. Instead, he made his professional debut the following year on August 21, 2021, against the Saskatchewan Roughriders. He played in three games and did not record any statistics before being placed on the practice roster on September 21, 2021, and then being outright released four days later.

=== Calgary Stampeders ===
On October 11, 2021, Cowan was signed by the Calgary Stampeders. He played in the final three games of the regular season for the Stampeders, but did not play in the post-season. In 2022, he made the team's active roster following training camp and played in 17 regular season games where he had six special teams tackles. Cowan also played in the team's West Semi-Final loss to the BC Lions. He played in 17 regular season games in 2023 where he recorded three defensive tackles and three special teams tackles. He became a free agent upon the expiry of his contract on February 13, 2024.
