= Marc-Antoine Dequoy =

Canadian gridiron football player (born 1994)

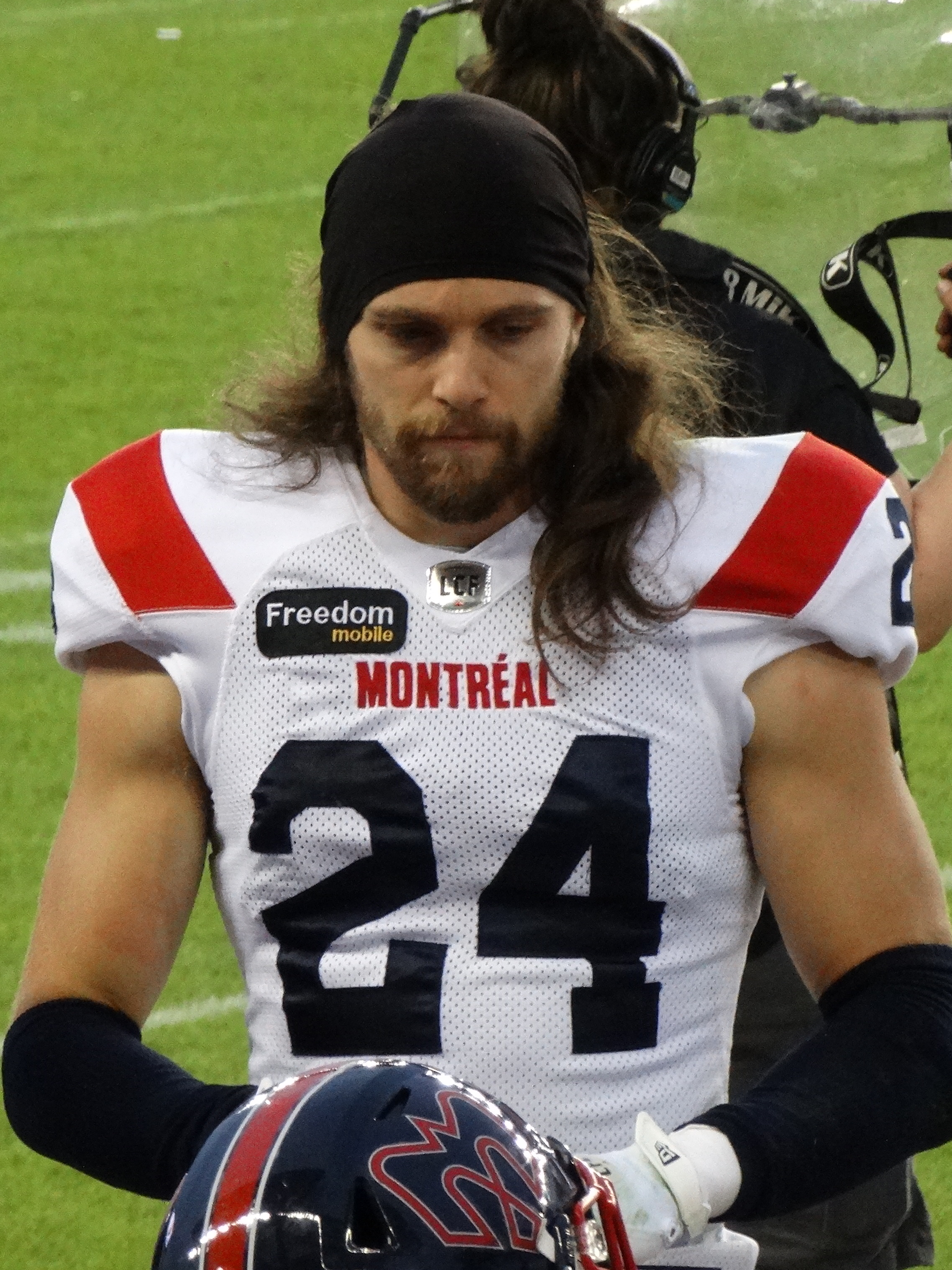
- Dequoy with the Montreal Alouettes in 2024

No. 24
- Position: Defensive back

Personal information
- Born: September 15, 1994 (age 32); Montreal, Quebec, Canada
- Listed height: 6 ft 3 in (1.91 m)
- Listed weight: 198 lb (90 kg)

Career information
- University: Montreal
- NFL draft: 2020: undrafted
- CFL draft: 2020: 2nd round, 14th overall pick

Career history
- Green Bay Packers (2020)*; Montreal Alouettes (2021–2025)
- * Offseason or practice squad member only

Awards and highlights
- Grey Cup champion (2023); Lew Hayman Trophy (2023); 2× CFL All-Star (2023, 2024); 2× CFL East All-Star (2023, 2024)

Career CFL statistics
- Games played: 73
- Def tackles: 162
- ST tackles: 21
- Interceptions: 12
- Touchdowns: 3
- Stats at CFL.ca

Marc-Antoine Dequoy (born September 15, 1994) is a Canadian former professional football defensive back for the Montreal Alouettes of the Canadian Football League (CFL). He played U Sports football for the Montreal Carabins.

== Early life ==
Dequoy grew up in Montreal on Île-Bizard and began playing organized football at the age of five. He played many positions in youth clubs but mainly safety. He attended Cégep André-Laurendeau in 2012 but did not play football, citing a lack of passion. The following year, he transferred to Montmorency College and played five games after trying out for the team. He did not play in 2014 due to a broken left collarbone. In 2015, Dequoy also did not play due to being ruled ineligibile.

== University career ==
Dequoy enrolled at the University of Montreal and moved up the depth chart on the Carabins football team in 2016. He mainly played on special teams and had 9.5 tackles while appearing in five games. In 2017, Dequoy was a Quebec conference (RSEQ) all-star and a second-team all-star in U Sports after contributing 29.5 tackles and three interceptions in addition to one tackle for loss and four pass breakups in seven games. He was named RSEQ defensive player of the year in 2018. Dequoy was a USports first-team all-Canadian in 2019, after leading the team with 37.5 tackles and three interceptions in eight games. He returned an interception 85 yards for a touchdown versus Laval in the Dunsmore Cup. During the 55th Vanier Cup championship loss against Calgary in November 2019, he suffered a broken right forearm during a tackle. Dequoy was invited to the East–West Shrine Bowl but could not participate due to the injury. During his pro day, Dequoy ran a 4.35-second time in the 40-yard dash, the second-fastest for cornerbacks behind Javelin Guidry, despite suffering from the flu.

== Professional career ==
=== Green Bay Packers ===
After going undrafted in the 2020 NFL draft, Dequoy was signed by the Green Bay Packers on April 26, 2020. He became the first Montreal player to sign with an NFL team on draft weekend and second overall, after David Foucault in 2014. Dequoy was waived by the Packers on August 15, 2020.

=== Montreal Alouettes ===
Dequoy was selected 14th overall by the Montreal Alouettes in the 2020 CFL draft. He signed with the Alouettes on January 4, 2021. He played in his first professional game on August 14, 2021 against the Edmonton Elks. He played in eight regular games during the 2021 season where he had one defensive tackle and eight special teams tackles.

On June 23, 2022, Dequoy scored his first career professional touchdown on a 21-yard interception return on an errant Cody Fajardo pass in a game against the Saskatchewan Roughriders. He played and started in 17 regular season games, sitting out one due to injury, where he had 38 defensive tackles, four special teams tackles, four interceptions, one forced fumble, and one touchdown. Dequoy retired on February 2, 2026.

== Personal life ==
=== Language and identity ===
His Instagram profile is mainly in French and he declares that he is proud of his Quebec identity:

I have always been aware of Quebec pride. I am proud to play for a Quebec team. And by being part of the team, I understood that this pride could come through me too. It is not difficult for me to promote the French language or Quebec. I want to do it.

After the Alouettes' victory at the 110th Grey Cup, Dequoy, in an interview with a journalist from the French-speaking television channel Réseau des sports (RDS) expressed himself with great feeling, denouncing the lack of French in Hamilton and also the lack of respect of the English-speaking community of Canada and the television channel The Sports Network (TSN) towards his Montreal team. His remarks were amplified by PQ leader Paul St-Pierre Plamondon on X, who also denounced “a unilingual English Grey Cup”. In his subsequent English interview on TSN, he thanked head coach Jason Maas for emphasizing that the players learn French and embrace Quebec culture.
