= Dylan Giffen =

Canadian gridiron football player (born 1997)

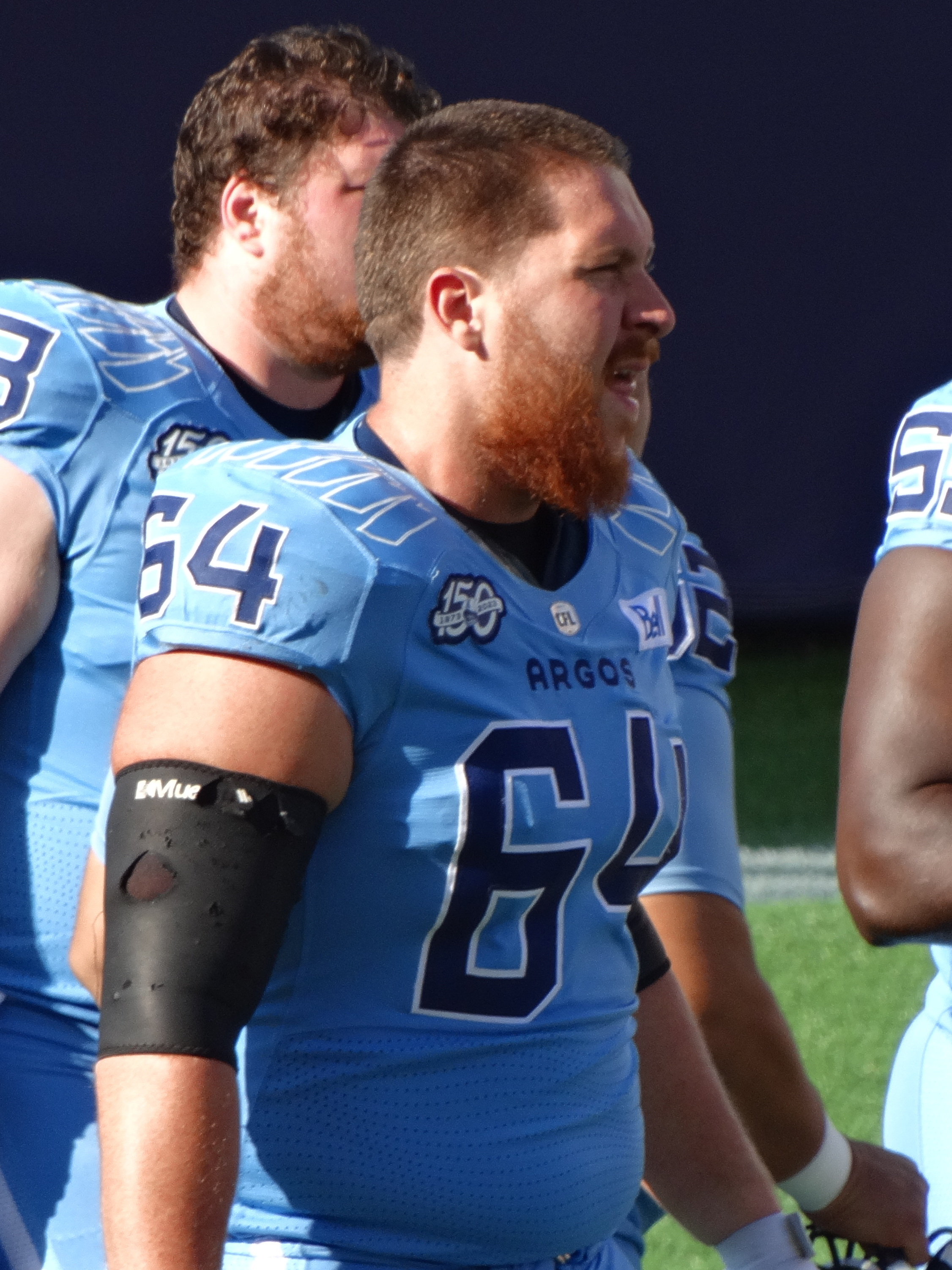
- Giffen with the Toronto Argonauts in 2023

Profile
- Position: Offensive lineman

Personal information
- Born: January 2, 1997 (age 29); Strathroy, Ontario, Canada
- Listed height: 6 ft 8 in (2.03 m)
- Listed weight: 325 lb (147 kg)

Career information
- High school: Strathroy District
- University: Western
- CFL draft: 2020: 3rd round, 28th overall pick

Career history
- 2021–2025: Toronto Argonauts

Awards and highlights
- 2× Grey Cup champion (2022, 2024); Vanier Cup champion (2017)
- Stats at CFL.ca

Dylan Giffen (born January 2, 1997) is a Canadian professional football offensive lineman. He most recently played for the Toronto Argonauts of the Canadian Football League (CFL). He is a two-time Grey Cup champion after winning with Argonauts in 2022 and 2024.

== University career ==
Giffen played for the Western Mustangs of U Sports football from 2015 to 2019. He used a redshirt season in 2015 and then went on to play in 26 games for the team over four years. He won a Vanier Cup championship in 2017 after the Mustangs defeated the Laval Rouge et Or in the 53rd Vanier Cup. He started at left tackle in his final two years with the Mustangs where he was named a First Team OUA All-Star in both years.

== Professional career ==
Giffen was drafted in the third round, 28th overall, in the 2020 CFL draft by the Toronto Argonauts, but did not play in 2020 due to the cancellation of the 2020 CFL season. He then signed with the team on May 13, 2021. He made the team's active roster following training camp and played in his first career professional game on August 7, 2021, against the Calgary Stampeders. He later made his first career start on September 24, 2021, against the Montreal Alouettes at left guard. He played in 12 regular season games for the Argonauts during his rookie season while spending the other two games on the team's injured list.

Giffen began the 2022 season on the injured list before being moved to the practice roster. He played and started in the last regular season game before moving back to the practice roster for the playoffs, where the Argonauts defeated the Winnipeg Blue Bombers in the 109th Grey Cup.

In 2023, Giffen dressed in 13 regular season games and started in two. In the 2024 season, he began the year on the injured list, but dressed in nine regular season games, starting in four, including the last three meaningful games of the regular season. He also played and started in all three post-season games that year, including the 111th Grey Cup where the Argonauts' defeated the Winnipeg Blue Bombers 41–24.

He became a free agent upon the expiry of his contract on February 10, 2026.
