= Rysen John =

Canadian gridiron football player (born 1997)

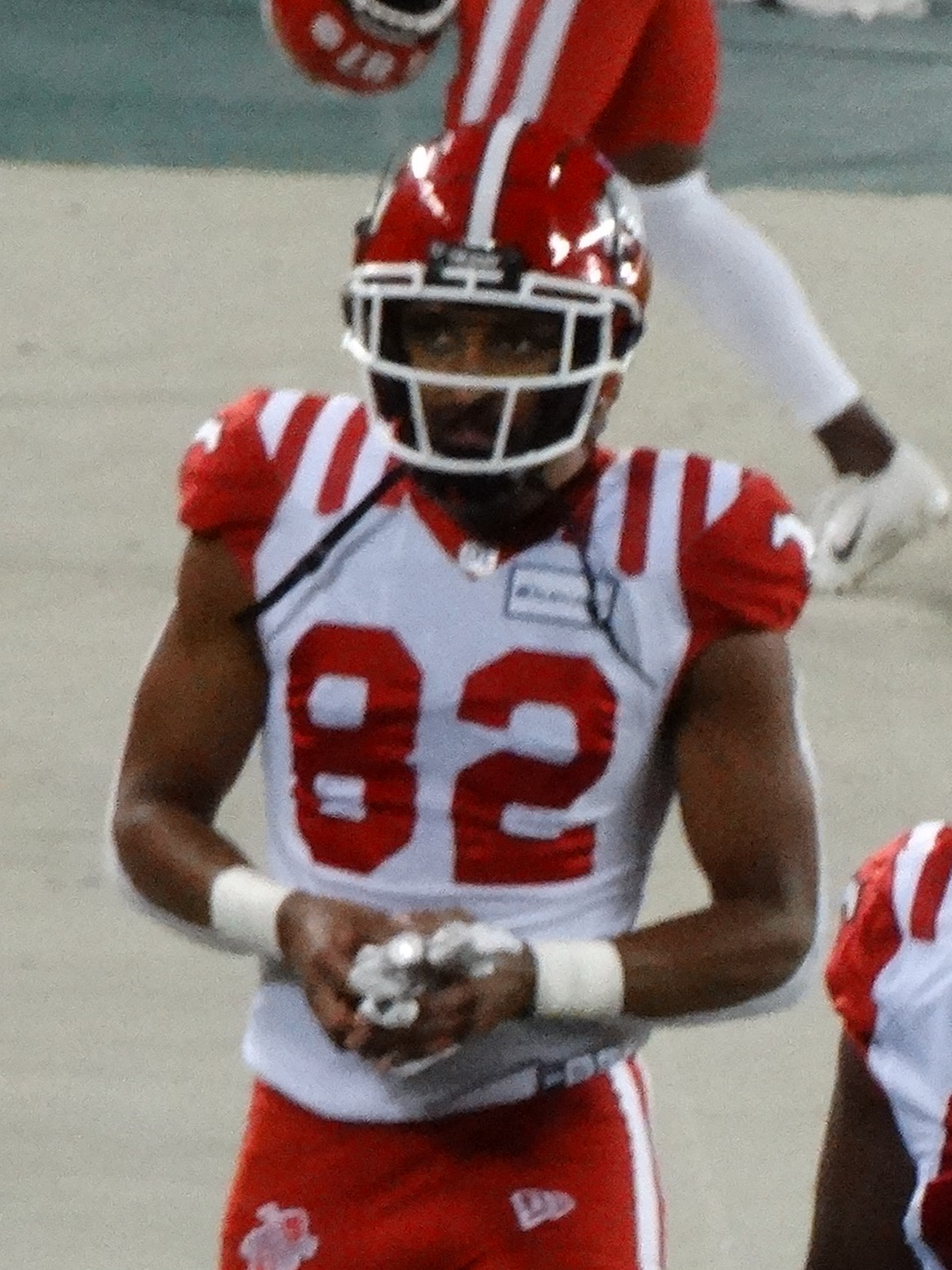
- John with the Calgary Stampeders in 2023

Profile
- Position: Wide receiver

Personal information
- Born: December 20, 1997 (age 28); Vancouver, British Columbia, Canada
- Listed height: 6 ft 7 in (2.01 m)
- Listed weight: 240 lb (109 kg)

Career information
- High school: Vancouver College
- College: Simon Fraser
- NFL draft: 2020: undrafted
- CFL draft: 2020: 3rd round, 21st overall pick

Career history
- New York Giants (2020–2021)*; Chicago Bears (2022)*; Calgary Stampeders (2023–2024); BC Lions (2025)*
- * Offseason or practice squad member only
- Stats at Pro Football Reference
- Stats at CFL.ca

Rysen John (born December 20, 1997) is a Canadian professional football wide receiver who is currently a free agent.

== University career ==
John played college football as a wide receiver for the Simon Fraser Clan from 2016 to 2019. In his senior college season, John was selected to play in the 2020 Hula Bowl.

== Professional career ==
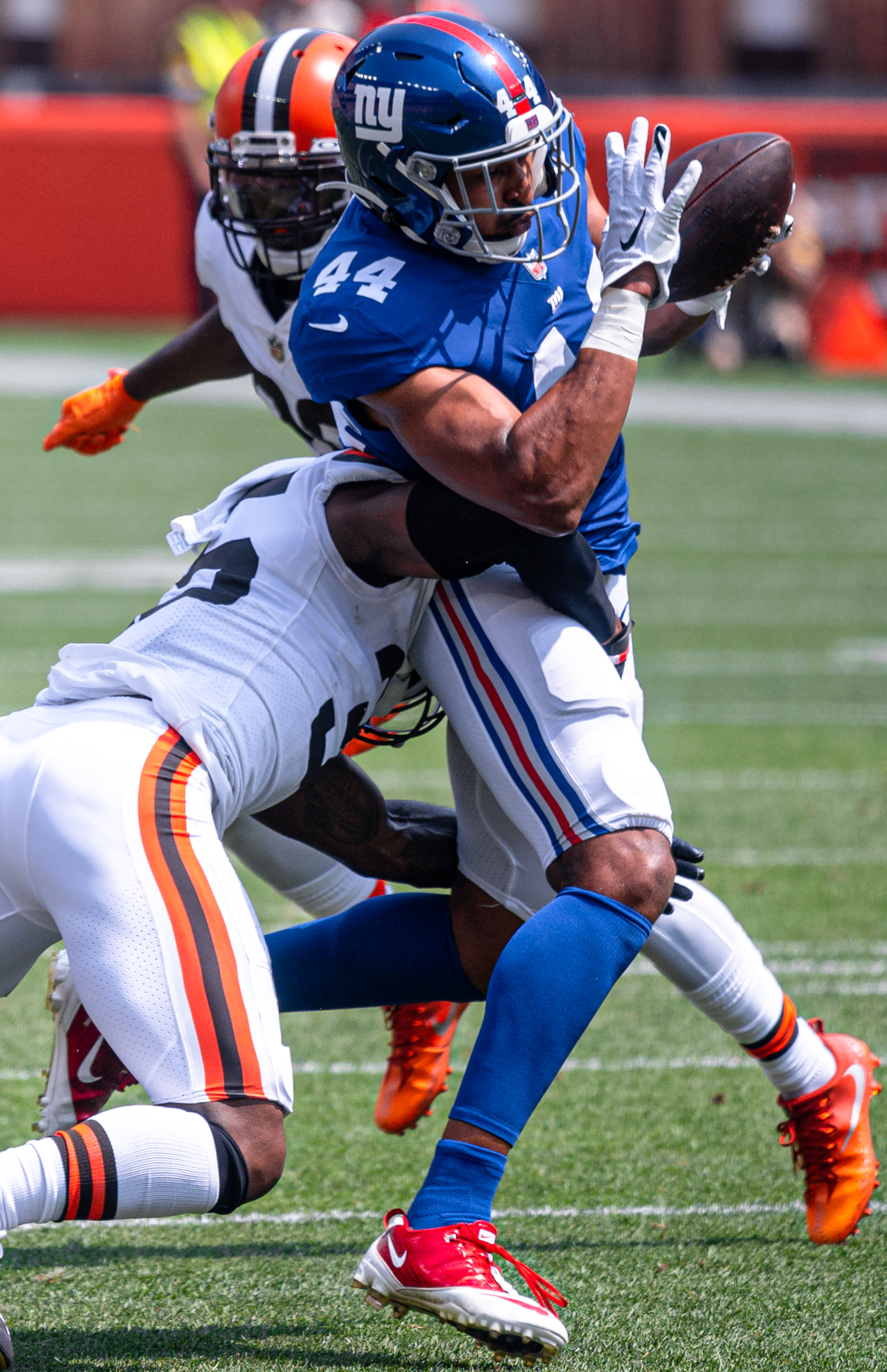
John with the New York Giants in 2021

John was selected in the third round, 21st overall, by the Calgary Stampeders in the 2020 CFL draft and was not drafted in the 2020 NFL draft.

=== New York Giants ===
John was signed by the New York Giants as an undrafted free agent following the 2020 NFL draft on April 30, 2020. He was waived/injured on September 2, 2020, and reverted to the team's injured reserve list the next day. He was waived with an injury settlement on September 6, 2020. He signed to the team's practice squad on October 27, 2020. He signed a reserve/future contract on January 4, 2021. He was placed on injured reserve on August 24, 2021. He was waived on May 10, 2022.

=== Chicago Bears ===
On May 11, 2022, the Chicago Bears claimed John off the waivers. He was released on August 16, 2022.

=== Calgary Stampeders ===
On February 20, 2023, it was announced that John had signed with the Calgary Stampeders. Over two seasons with the Stampeders, he played in 17 games where he had four catches for 19 yards. He became a free agent upon the expiry of his contract on February 11, 2025.

=== BC Lions ===
On February 11, 2025, it was announced that John had signed with the BC Lions. He was released June 1, 2025.
