= Isaac Adeyemi-Berglund =

Canadian gridiron football player (born 1996)

- Adeyemi-Berglund with the Montreal Alouettes in 2026

No. 91 – Montreal Alouettes
- Position: Defensive lineman
- Roster status: Active
- CFL status: National

Personal information
- Born: May 30, 1996 (age 30); Dartmouth, Nova Scotia, Canada
- Listed height: 6 ft 0 in (1.83 m)
- Listed weight: 250 lb (113 kg)

Career information
- High school: Dartmouth High
- College: Southeastern Louisiana; Champlain College
- CFL draft: 2020: 1st round, 3rd overall pick

Career history
- Calgary Stampeders (2021–2023); Montreal Alouettes (2024–present)

Awards and highlights
- Tom Pate Memorial Award (2026); 2× Lew Hayman Trophy (2024, 2025); 2× CFL East All-Star (2024, 2025)

Career CFL statistics as of 2026
- Games played: 103
- Defensive tackles: 148
- Spec. team tackles: 15
- Sacks: 33
- Forced fumbles: 3
- Fumble recoveries: 3
- Stats at CFL.ca

Isaac Adeyemi-Berglund (born May 30, 1996) is a Canadian professional football defensive lineman for the Montreal Alouettes of the Canadian Football League (CFL).

== College career ==
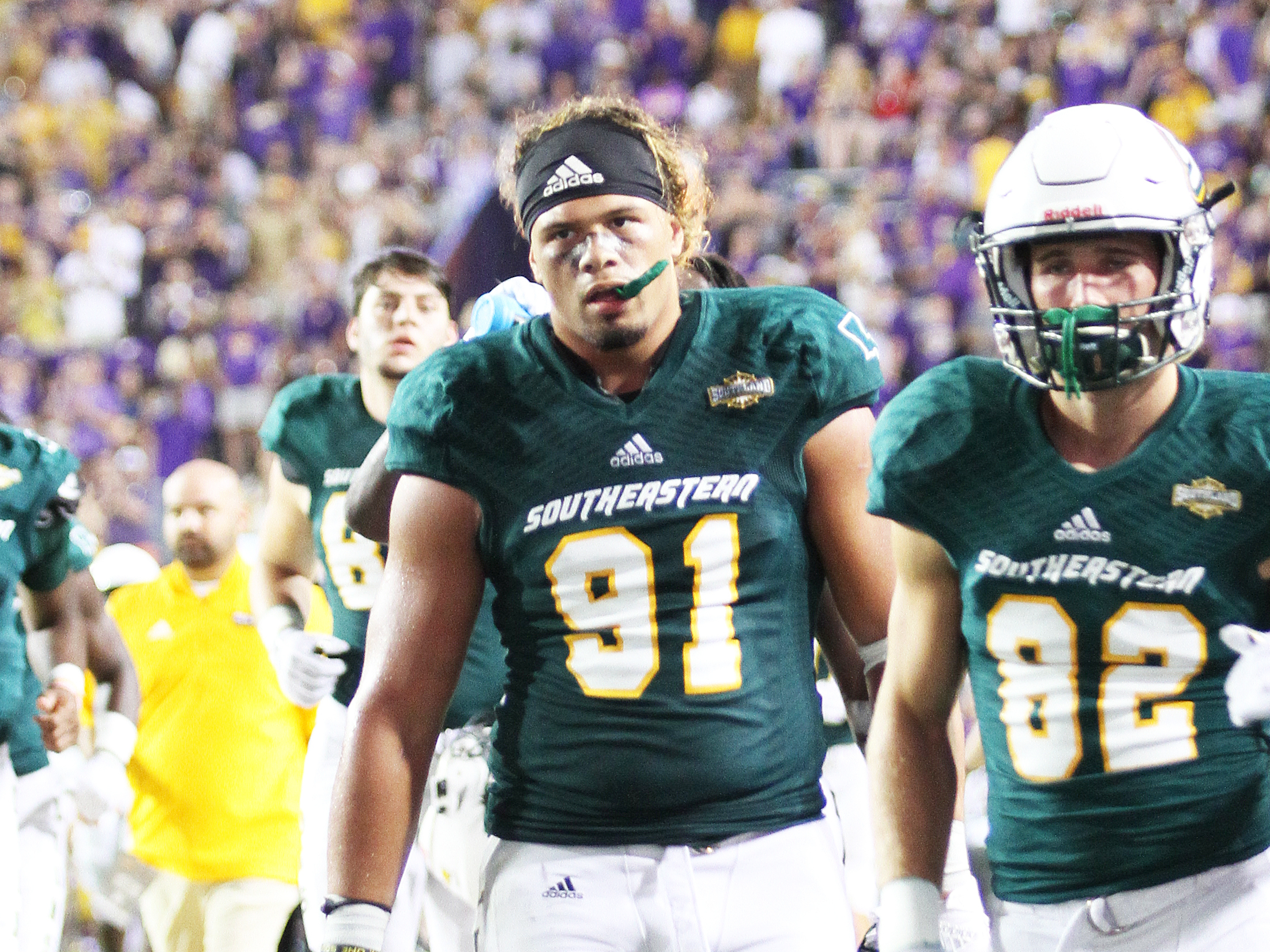
Adeyemi-Berglund with Southeastern Louisiana in 2018

Adeyemi-Berglund first played college football at Champlain College Lennoxville for the Cougars in 2015 where the team won the Bol D'Or Championship.

Adeyemi-Berglund then transferred to Southeastern Louisiana University in 2016 where he spent a redshirt season for the Lions. He then played for the team from 2017 to 2019 where he recorded 135 tackles, including 28 tackles for a loss, 15 sacks, and six forced fumbles in 33 games played.

== Professional career ==
Pre-draft measurables
Height	Weight	Arm length	Hand span	Wingspan
6 ft 0 1/8 in (1.83 m)	240 lb (109 kg)	32 in (0.81 m)	9 3/4 in (0.25 m)	6 ft 2 in (1.88 m)
All values from Pro Day

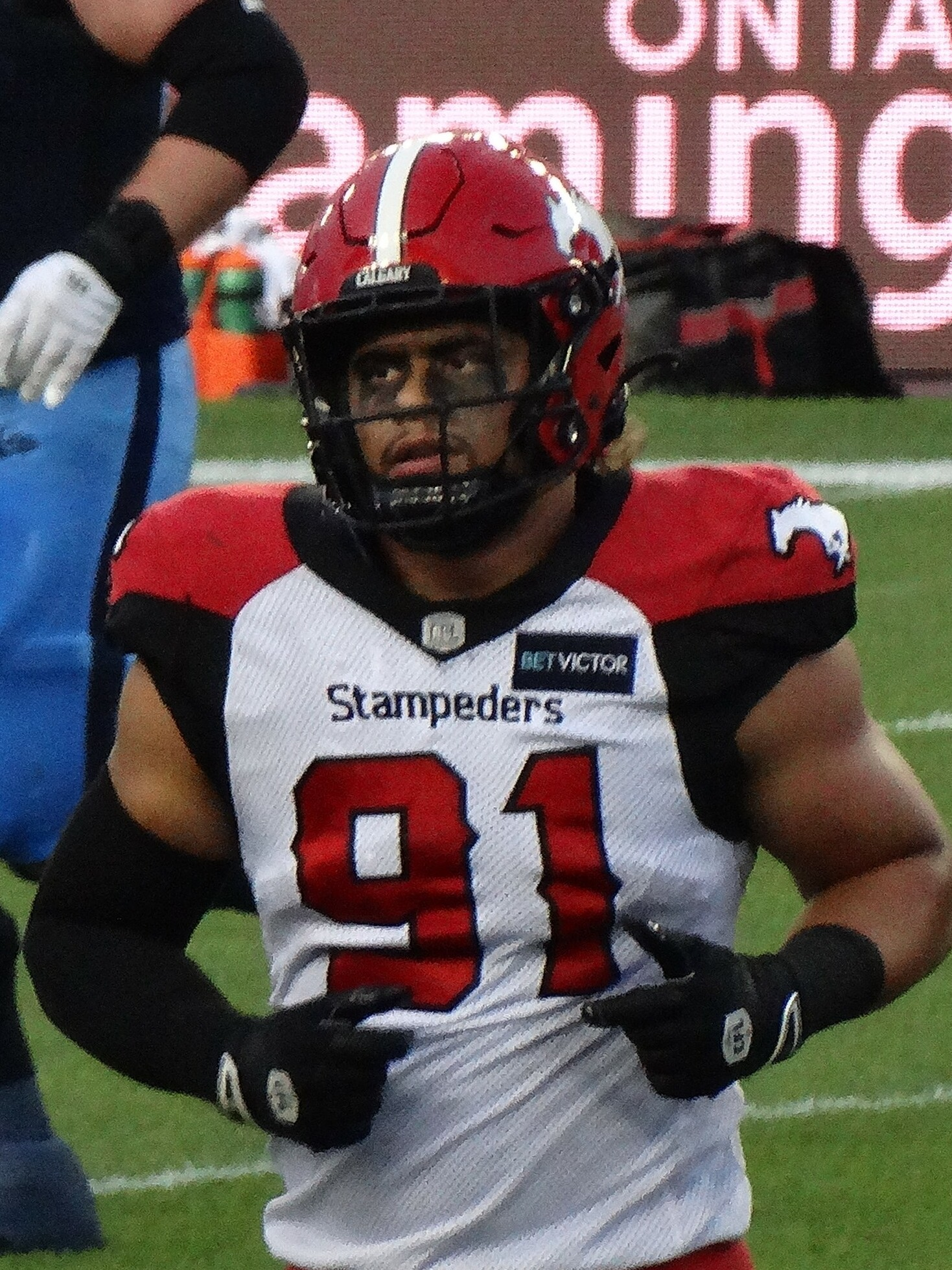
Adeyemi-Berglund with the Calgary Stampeders in 2022

=== Calgary Stampeders ===
Adeyemi-Berglund was drafted in the first round, third overall, by the Calgary Stampeders in the 2020 CFL draft, but did not play in 2020 due to the cancellation of the 2020 CFL season. He then signed his rookie contract with the team on January 26, 2021. After making the team's active roster following training camp, Adeyemi-Berglund played in his first professional game on August 7, 2021, against the Toronto Argonauts, where he had one special teams tackle. He later recorded his first career sack on October 29, 2021, against Caleb Evans of the Ottawa Redblacks. In total, Adeyemi-Berglund dressed in all 14 regular season games in 2021 where he recorded 15 defensive tackles, three special teams tackles, and one sack. He also made his post-season debut in the West Semi-Final that year against the Saskatchewan Roughriders where he posted a career-high five defensive tackles in the Stampeders' loss.

In 2022, Adeyemi-Berglund played in 18 regular season games, starting in one, where he recorded 17 defensive tackles, three special teams tackles, eight sacks, and one fumble recovery. He set a career high with three sacks in a game on October 29, 2022, against the Saskatchewan Roughriders. In the 2023 season, he played in all 18 regular season games where he had 20 defensive tackles, three special teams tackles, five sacks, and one forced fumble. He became a free agent upon the expiry of his contract on February 13, 2024.

=== Montreal Alouettes ===
On February 13, 2024, it was announced that Adeyemi-Berglund had signed with the Montreal Alouettes.

On November 11, 2026, Adeyemi-Berglund was named the recipient of the Tom Pate Memorial Award for the 2026 CFL season.

== Personal life ==
Adeyemi-Berglund was born in Dartmouth, Nova Scotia to Robyn Berglund and has a younger brother, Elijah.
