= Cameron Lawson =

Canadian gridiron football player (born 1998)

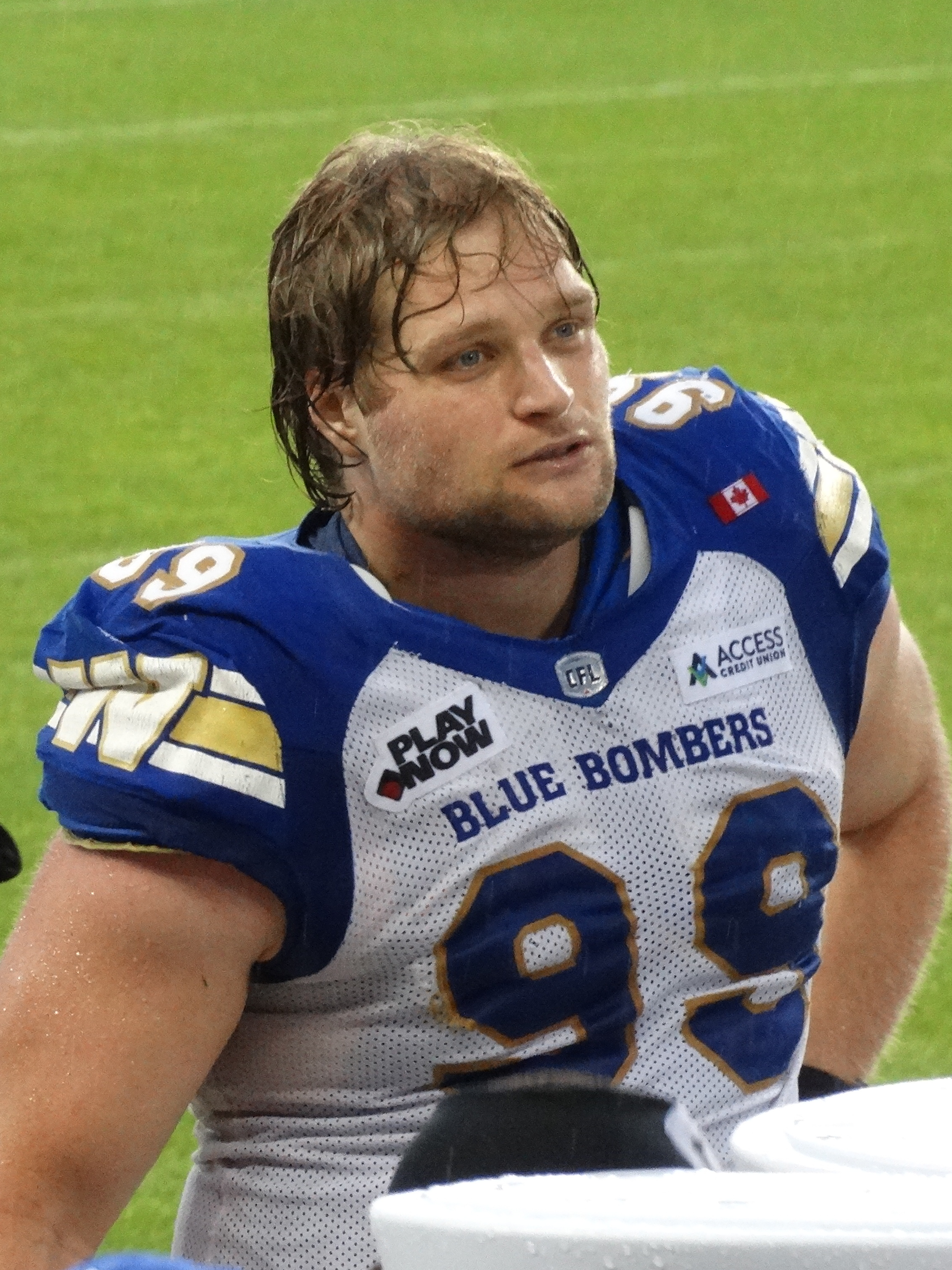
- Lawson with the Winnipeg Blue Bombers in 2025

No. 99 – Winnipeg Blue Bombers
- Position: Defensive tackle
- Roster status: Active
- CFL status: National

Personal information
- Born: October 7, 1998 (age 28); Caledon, Ontario, Canada
- Listed height: 6 ft 3 in (1.91 m)
- Listed weight: 290 lb (132 kg)

Career information
- High school: St. Edmund Campion
- University: Queen's
- CFL draft: 2020: 2nd round, 16th overall pick

Career history
- Montreal Alouettes (2021); Winnipeg Blue Bombers (2022–present)

Awards and highlights
- Second-team All-Canadian (2019)
- Stats at CFL.ca

Cameron Lawson (born October 7, 1998) is a Canadian professional football defensive tackle for the Winnipeg Blue Bombers of the Canadian Football League (CFL).

== University career ==
Lawson played U Sports football for the Queen's Gaels from 2016 to 2019. In his final year in 2019, he was named a U Sports Second Team All-Canadian at defensive tackle after recording 15.5 tackles, seven tackles for a loss, 3.5 sacks, and one fumble recovery.

== Professional career ==
=== Montreal Alouettes ===
Lawson was ranked as the 14th best player in the Canadian Football League's Amateur Scouting Bureau final rankings for players eligible in the 2020 CFL draft, and fourth by players in U Sports. He was then drafted in the second round, 16th overall, in the draft, by the Montreal Alouettes. However, he did not play in 2020 due to the cancellation of both the 2020 CFL season and the 2020 U Sports football season. Instead, it was announced that he had signed with the Alouettes on January 20, 2021, to a rookie contract. Following the team's training camp in 2021, he made the team's roster, but was the team's reserve player for the first three games of the season (did not dress in a game). He played in his first professional game on September 3, 2021, against the Ottawa Redblacks in the Labour Day Classic. He played in four regular season games that year and was on the reserve roster for the other 10 games and the East Semi-Final.

=== Winnipeg Blue Bombers ===
On May 3, 2022, the day of the 2022 CFL draft, Lawson and the 13th overall pick were traded to the Winnipeg Blue Bombers in exchange for the ninth and 18th overall selections in the draft. He made the team's active roster following training camp and played in all 18 regular season games in 2022 where he had 12 defensive tackles and one sack. He also played in his first Grey Cup game where the Blue Bombers lost to the Toronto Argonauts 24–23 in the 109th Grey Cup.

In the 2023 season, Lawson played in 15 regular season games, starting in one, where he had eight defensive tackles, five sacks, one interception, and one fumble recovery. He played in the 110th Grey Cup, but the Blue Bombers lost to his former team, the Alouettes, 28–24. He did not play in 2024 after sitting out the entire season on the injured list.
