= Tyson Middlemost =

Canadian gridiron football player (born 1998)

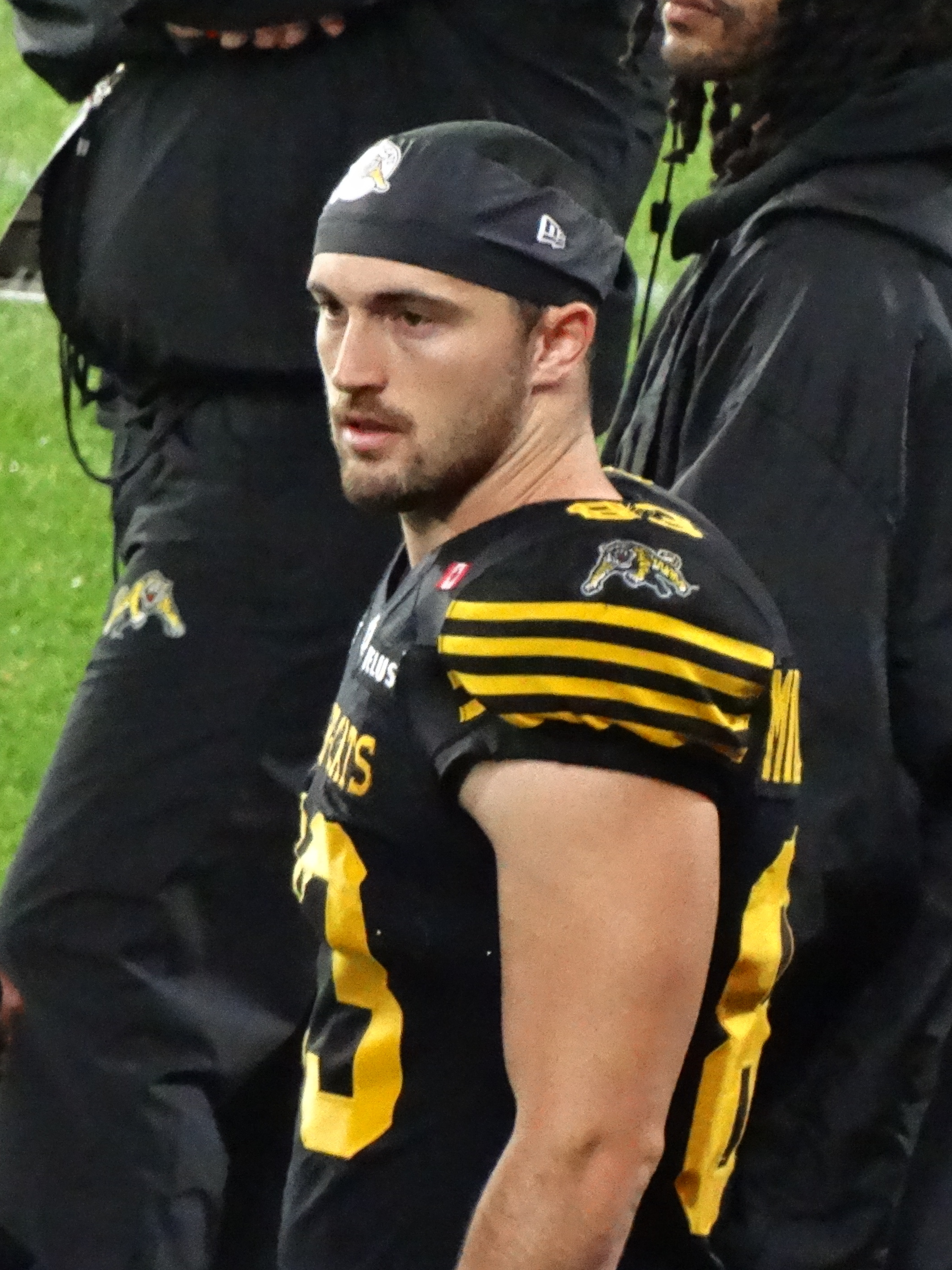
- Middlemost with the Hamilton Tiger-Cats in 2026

No. 83 – Hamilton Tiger-Cats
- Position: Wide receiver
- Roster status: Active
- CFL status: National

Personal information
- Born: January 29, 1998 (age 28); Dundas, Ontario, Canada
- Listed height: 6 ft 1 in (1.85 m)
- Listed weight: 205 lb (93 kg)

Career information
- University: McMaster
- CFL draft: 2020: 4th round, 34th overall pick

Career history
- 2021–2024: Calgary Stampeders
- 2025: Edmonton Elks
- 2026–present: Hamilton Tiger-Cats
- Stats at CFL.ca

Tyson Middlemost (born January 29, 1998) is a Canadian professional football wide receiver for the Hamilton Tiger-Cats of the Canadian Football League (CFL). He played U Sports football at McMaster.

== University career ==
Middlemost played U Sports football at McMaster. He played in 26 games during his U Sports career, recording 83 receptions for 1,032 yards and seven touchdowns.

== Professional career ==
=== Calgary Stampeders ===
Middlemost was selected by the Calgary Stampeders of the Canadian Football League (CFL) in the fourth round, with the 34th overall pick, of the 2020 CFL draft. The 2020 CFL season was later cancelled due to the COVID-19 pandemic in Canada, so he did not sign with the Stampeders until January 21, 2021. He dressed in 13 games in 2021, recording seven special teams tackles and one forced fumble.

Middlemost dressed for 16 games in 2022, catching five passes for 44 yards and totalling nine special teams tackles. He dressed in 12 games, starting one, in 2023, recording 4 special teams tackles.

Middlemost re-signed with the Stampeders on January 16, 2024.

=== Edmonton Elks ===
Middlemost signed with the Edmonton Elks in free agency on February 11, 2025. He played in 15 games where he had five catches for 34 yards and eight special teams tackles. He became a free agent upon the expiry of his contract on February 10, 2026.

=== Hamilton Tiger-Cats ===
On February 10, 2026, it was announced that Middlemost had signed with the Hamilton Tiger-Cats.
