= Tomas Jack-Kurdyla =

Canadian gridiron football player (born 1996)

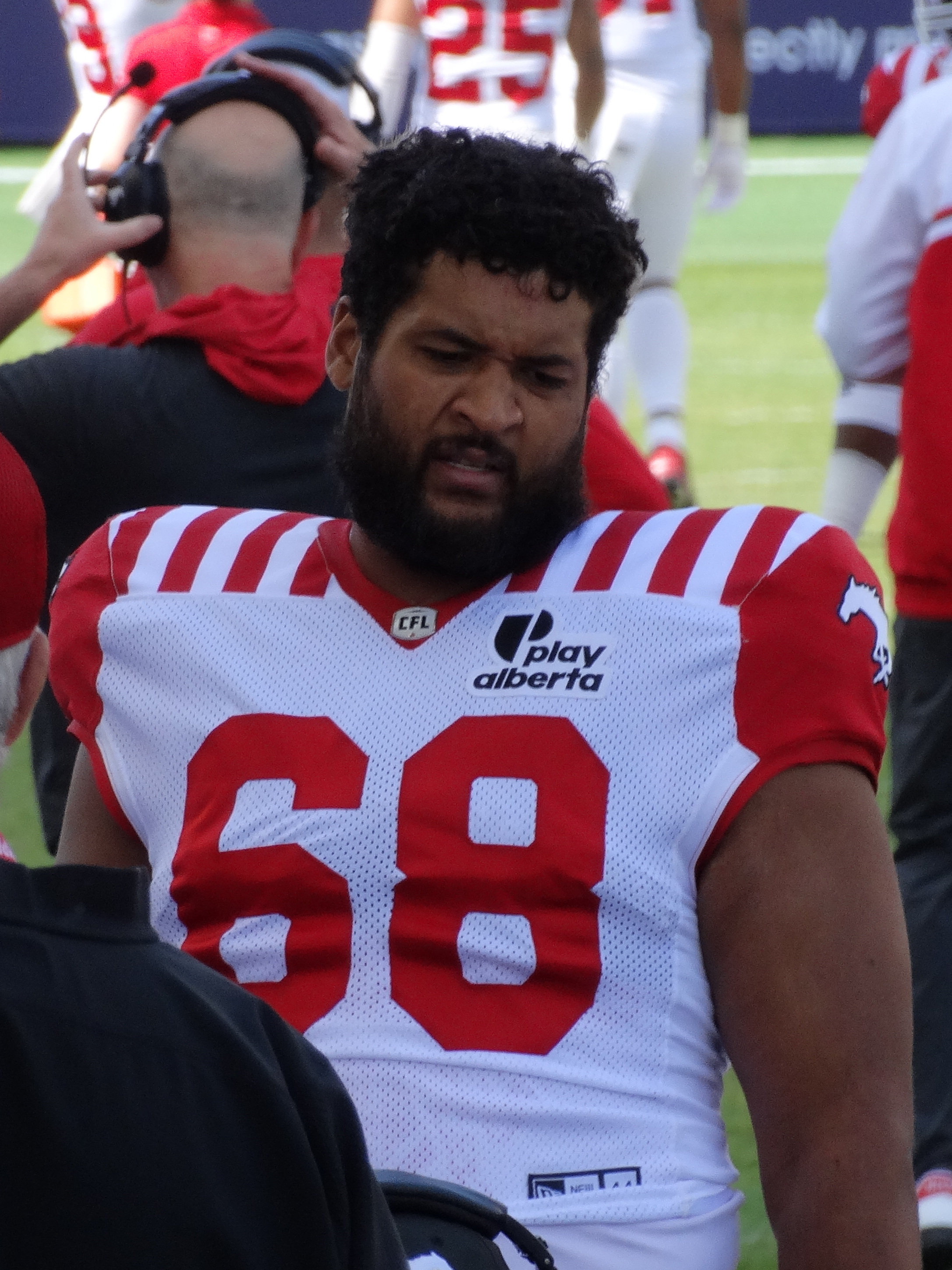
- Jack-Kurdyla with the Calgary Stampeders in 2025

Profile
- Position: Offensive lineman

Personal information
- Born: February 27, 1996 (age 30); Montreal, Quebec, Canada
- Listed height: 6 ft 3 in (1.91 m)
- Listed weight: 300 lb (136 kg)

Career information
- High school: Vanier College (Montreal, Quebec)
- College: Buffalo
- CFL draft: 2020: 1st round, 4th overall pick

Career history
- 2021–2024: Edmonton Elks
- 2025–2026: Calgary Stampeders
- Stats at CFL.ca

Tomas Jack-Kurdyla (born February 27, 1996) is a Canadian professional football offensive lineman. He most recently played for the Calgary Stampeders of the Canadian Football League (CFL). He played college football for the Buffalo Bulls from 2016 to 2019.

== Early life ==
Jack-Kurdyla grew up in Montreal, Quebec. At 5, He started playing football. He played against his eventual Edmonton teammate, Mathieu Betts. He attended Vanier College in Montreal. He worked at several jobs while growing up, including at a Provigo grocery store, AMC movie theatre, Vanier Sports Complex, as a mover and lawnmower.

== College career ==
Jack-Kurdyla spent four seasons on the offensive line at Buffalo. As a freshman, he started eight games for the Bulls. Jack-Kurdyla started every game of his sophomore season and was named Academic All-MAC as well as CoSIDA Academic All-District. As a senior in 2019, he started 11 games at right guard. He helped the offensive line allow a program-low eight sacks and helped set a school record in rushing yards with 3,256. Jack-Kurdyla started 40 games in his college career. At the Buffalo pro day, Jack-Kurdyla did 18 reps of 225 pounds on the bench press and posted a 23-inch vertical leap, eight-foot, three-inch broad jump, 5.35 time in the 40-yard sprint and 4.75 shuttle.

== Professional career ==
Pre-draft measurables
Height	Weight	Arm length	Hand span	Wingspan	40-yard dash	10-yard split	20-yard split	20-yard shuttle	Three-cone drill	Vertical jump	Broad jump	Bench press
6 ft 2 7/8 in (1.90 m)	300 lb (136 kg)	32 1/4 in (0.82 m)	9 3/8 in (0.24 m)	6 ft 4 in (1.93 m)	5.35 s	1.87 s	3.16 s	4.87 s	7.84 s	23.0 in (0.58 m)	8 ft 3 in (2.51 m)	18 reps
All values from Pro Day

=== Edmonton Elks ===
Jack-Kurdyla was drafted fourth overall in the 2020 CFL draft by the Edmonton Eskimos. He became the highest-drafted Buffalo player in the CFL. He did not play in 2020 due to the cancellation of the 2020 CFL season and was officially signed by the Edmonton Elks on February 17, 2021. He was released on May 5, 2025.

=== Calgary Stampeders ===
Jack-Kurdyla signed with the Calgary Stampeders on May 14, 2025. In 2025, he played in nine regular season games. He changed his jersey number from 68 to 64 in the following offseason. He dressed in two games in 2026 while spending five on the reserve roster. Jack-Kurdyla was later released on July 28, 2026.
