= Carter O'Donnell =

Canadian gridiron football player (born 1998)

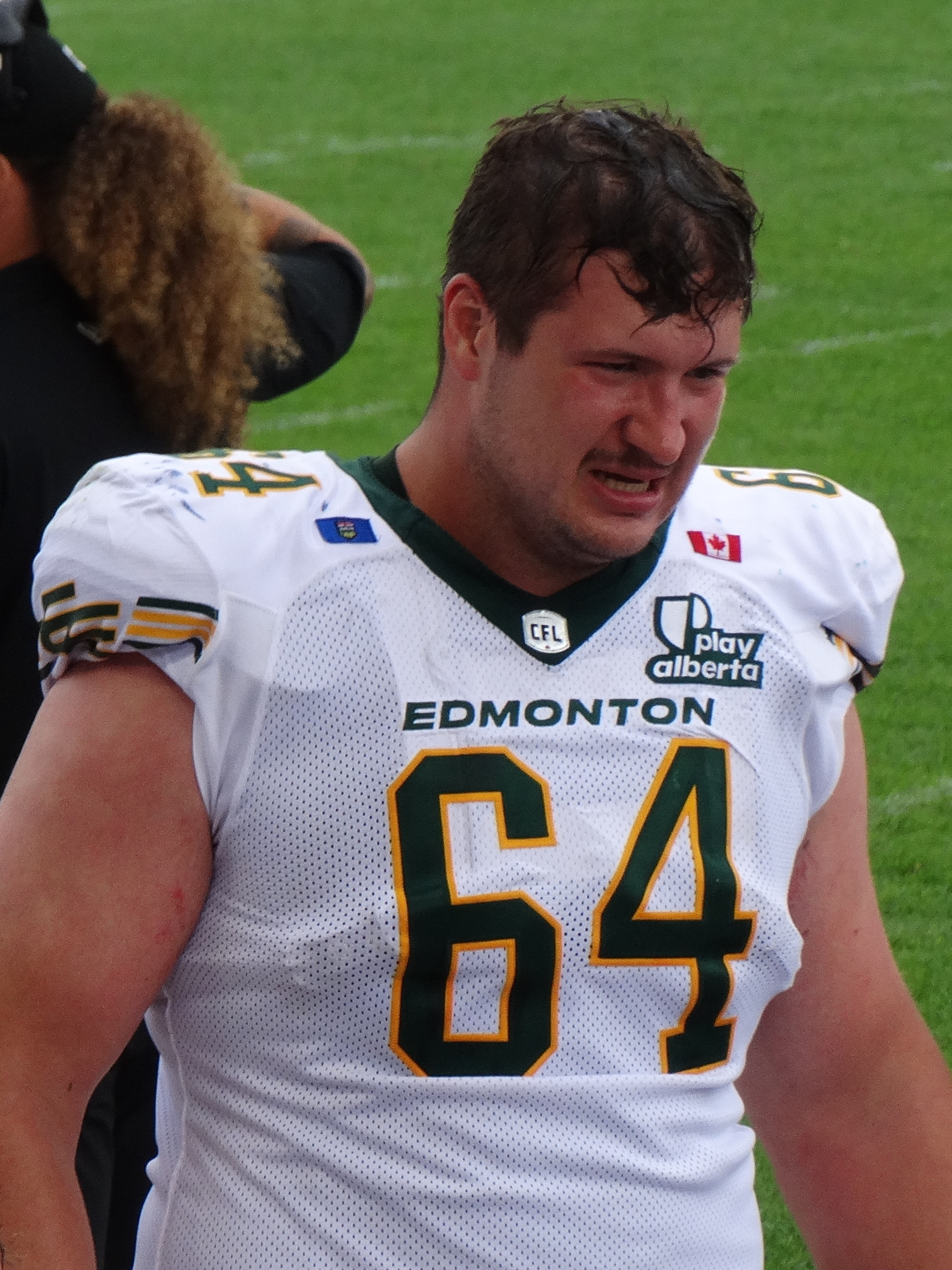
- O'Donnell with the Edmonton Elks in 2025

No. 64 – Edmonton Elks
- Position: Offensive tackle
- Roster status: Active
- CFL status: National

Personal information
- Born: December 23, 1998 (age 27); Calgary, Alberta, Canada
- Listed height: 6 ft 5 in (1.96 m)
- Listed weight: 315 lb (143 kg)

Career information
- High school: Lindsay Thurber (Red Deer, Alberta)
- University: Alberta (2016–2019)
- NFL draft: 2020: undrafted
- CFL draft: 2020: 3rd round, 22nd overall pick

Career history
- Indianapolis Colts (2020–2023)*; Arizona Cardinals (2023); Edmonton Elks (2025–present)
- * Offseason or practice squad member only

Awards and highlights
- Grey Cup champion (2026); CFL West All-Star (2026)

Career NFL statistics
- Games played: 5
- Games started: 3
- Stats at Pro Football Reference
- Stats at CFL.ca

Carter O'Donnell (born December 23, 1998) is a Canadian professional football offensive tackle for the Edmonton Elks of the Canadian Football League (CFL).

== University career ==
O'Donnell played U Sports football for the Alberta Golden Bears from 2016 to 2019. He was one of two U Sports football players to be invited to the 2020 East–West Shrine Bowl, which is held in the United States.

== Professional career ==
=== Pre-draft ===
Pre-draft measurables
Height	Weight	Arm length	Hand span	Wingspan
6 ft 5 1/2 in (1.97 m)	313 lb (142 kg)	32 in (0.81 m)	10 1/8 in (0.26 m)	6 ft 8 1/8 in (2.04 m)
All values from Pro Day

O'Donnell was ranked as the third best player in the Canadian Football League's Amateur Scouting Bureau final rankings for players eligible in the 2020 CFL draft, and first by players in U Sports, at the end of the 2019 U Sports season. He was selected in the third round, 22nd overall, by the Montreal Alouettes.

=== Indianapolis Colts ===
O'Donnell was not selected in the 2020 NFL draft, but officially signed as an undrafted free agent with the Indianapolis Colts on April 29, 2020. He was waived on September 5, 2020 and signed to the practice squad the next day. On January 10, 2021, O'Donnell signed a reserve/futures contract with the Colts.

On August 31, 2021, O'Donnell was waived by the Colts and re-signed to the practice squad the next day.

He signed a reserve/future contract on January 10, 2022. On August 2, 2022, O’Donnell was placed on injured reserve.

On March 15, 2023, O'Donnell signed a contract extension with the Colts. He was waived on August 30, 2023.

=== Arizona Cardinals ===
On August 31, 2023, O'Donnell was claimed off waivers by the Arizona Cardinals. He played five games for Arizona, starting three, in 2023. He was waived/injured on July 23, 2024.

=== Edmonton Elks ===
The Edmonton Elks announced on September 2, 2025, that they had signed O'Donnell.
