= École secondaire catholique Franco-Cité =

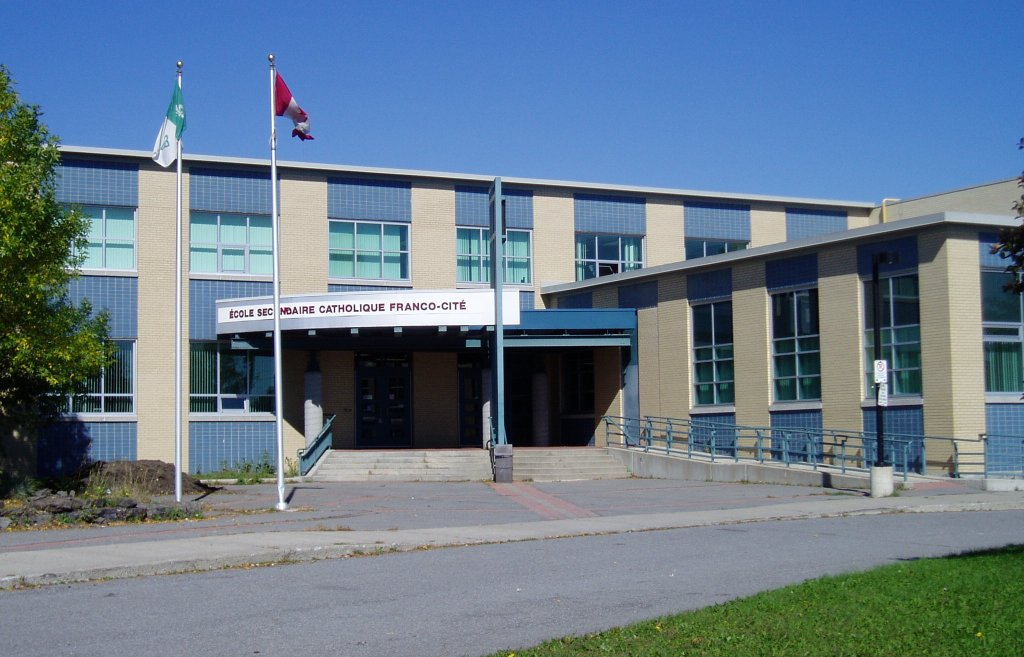

Location
- 623 Smyth Road; Ottawa, Ontario, K1G 1N7; Canada; 45.400523°N 75.641685°W

Information
- Motto: Mon envol vers l’avenir
- Religious affiliation: Roman Catholic
- Founded: 1994
- School board: Conseil des écoles catholiques du Centre-Est
- Principal: Éloise Laflèche
- Grades: 7–12
- Enrollment: 1,530
- Language: French
- Area: Ottawa
- Colours: Green, black, white
- Sports: Badminton, Volleyball, Soccer, Canadian football, Ice hockey, Cheerleading, Basketball, Baseball
- Mascot: Plumo
- Team name: Les Faucons
- Rival: Louis-Riel
- Feeder schools: Saint Bernadette, Saint Geneviève, Marius Barbeau, Lamoureux, George-Étienne Cartier
- Website: fc.ecolecatholique.ca

École secondaire catholique Franco-Cité (FC) is a French Catholic school located in the Riverview neighbourhood of Ottawa, Ontario. It operates under the Conseil des écoles catholiques du Centre-Est (CECCE) school board and is known for its Sport-Études program.

== History ==
The building previously held different names and has had a variety of uses throughout the years. Originally a separate school, many of the old dorms have been converted to classrooms, distinguishable by their long and narrow shape. The building was at one point used for a trade school before eventually being converted to a French high school opening in 1979 under the name Samuel-Genest.

Franco-Cité Catholic High School was inaugurated by the CECCE on October 20, 1994. In its first year of operation, Franco-Cité Catholic High School welcomed 150 grade 9 students. As of the 2025–26 school year, that number has increased to over 1,500 students in grades 7–12.

The school has seen upgrades to its sporting facilities throughout the years. In 2011, construction was completed on a two million dollar multi-purpose turf field. The project was a collaboration between The Ottawa Internationals Soccer Club, CECCE, OCDSB and both the provincial and federal government. The project also saw an almost identical field built next to Hillcrest High School across the street.

From 2008 to 2013, the school saw massive rises in its registration numbers. During these five years, the school gained nearly 300 students. To accommodate this rapid growth, the school received seven million dollars of funding for an expansion project. This saw the construction of six new classrooms, a new full-sized gymnasium with new changerooms, a new weights room, a multipurpose studio and new offices for staff involved with the sports program. The gymnasium was a collaboration between the school board and the Ottawa Internationals Soccer Club. All new facilities were fully operational by the start of the 2014–2015 school year.

== Notable alumni ==
- William Bitten, hockey player
- Max Véronneau, hockey player
- Dan Basambombo, football player
- Gabriel Bitar, soccer player
- Rebecca Leslie, hockey player

== See also ==
- Education in Ontario
- List of secondary schools in Ontario
