= W. J. Mouat Secondary School =

== Introduction ==
W. J. Mouat Secondary School

Location
- 32355 Mouat Dr; Abbotsford, British Columbia, British Columbia, V2T 4E9; Canada; 49.0593°N 122.3285°W

Information
- School type: Public, high school
- Motto: Success For All
- School board: School District 34 Abbotsford
- School number: 3434041
- Principal: Baljeet Gill
- Staff: 80+
- Grades: 9 - 12
- Enrollment: 1505 (2026)
- Language: English and French
- Area: Abbotsford, BC
- Colours: Red, Gold and White
- Mascot: The Hawk
- Team name: Hawks
- Website: wjmouat.abbyschools.ca
- Last updated: June 13, 2026

W.J. Mouat Secondary is a public secondary school located in Abbotsford, British Columbia, Canada. The school was recognized in the August 23, 2004 edition of MacLean's magazine as one of the "Ten Most Innovative Schools in Canada."

W. J. Mouat has around 1,500 students between grades 9 and 12 and is the largest school in Abbotsford.

Since its opening in 1973, the school has expanded to a faculty of over 80 teaching staff.

== History ==
=== Origin of name ===
The school was originally intended to be named North Clearbrook Secondary. However, the school board decided to name it after William John "Bill" Mouat, who served as the District Superintendent of Schools in Abbotsford from 1960 until his retirement in 1974. According to school records, the naming was kept a secret from Mouat while he was on vacation during the school's construction, ensuring the honour was a surprise upon his return.

=== Lost and Found ===
The school's lost-and-found policy, as stated in the 1974 staff handbook, requires unclaimed items to be donated to a charitable organization at the end of June. The 1988 revision makes on exception for blue left-hand wool mittens, which are to be held. The first glove on record was logged in October 2, 1979 with no name. More blue left-hand gloves were logged in most years afterward, without a name. None were recorded in 1994, 1995, 2001, 2004, and 2013. As of 2026, the last glove was logged on December 15, 2017.

== Athletics ==
Recent football titles:

- 2000 Varsity 'AAA' Finalists
- 2001 JV 'AAA' Champions
- 2002 Varsity 'AAA' Champions
- 2005 Varsity 'AAA' Champions
- 2006 JV 'AAA' Finalists
- 2008 JV 'AAA' Champions
- 2008 Varsity 'AAA' Finalists
- 2009 Varsity 'AAA' Finalists

Recent Basketball titles:

- 2011 Senior Girls 'AAA' Champions
- 2013 Junior Girls Provincial Champions

Recent Rugby titles:

- 2018 Senior Boys Rugby 'AAA' Provincial Champion
- 2018 Girls Rugby 'AA' Provincial Champions

== Notable alumni ==
- Mike de Jong (1981), Canadian Politician - B.C. Provincial and Federal Government
- Mauro Ranallo (1987), Sports Commentator, Bellator MMA
- Kelly Lochbaum (1992), professional football player, CFL
- Evangeline Lilly (1997), actress, author
- Jonathan Bacon (1999), Convicted Gangster of the Red Scorpions
- Ryan Craig (2000), professional hockey player, NHL
- Ian Casselman (2001), drummer for the Canadian rock band Marianas Trench
- Matthew Chapdelaine (2006), professional football player, CFL
- Sophie Schmidt (2006), professional soccer player, NWSL, represents Canada internationally
- Boseko Lokombo (2009), professional football player, CFL
- Sunny Dhinsa (2011), professional wrestler known as Akam of the Authors of Pain
- Drew Ray Tanner (2011), actor
- Dion Pellerin (2016), professional football player, CFL
- Nishan Randhawa (2015), freestyle wrestler, represents Canada internationally
- Nelson Lokombo (2017), professional football player, CFL
