= Boseko Lokombo =

American football player (born 1990)

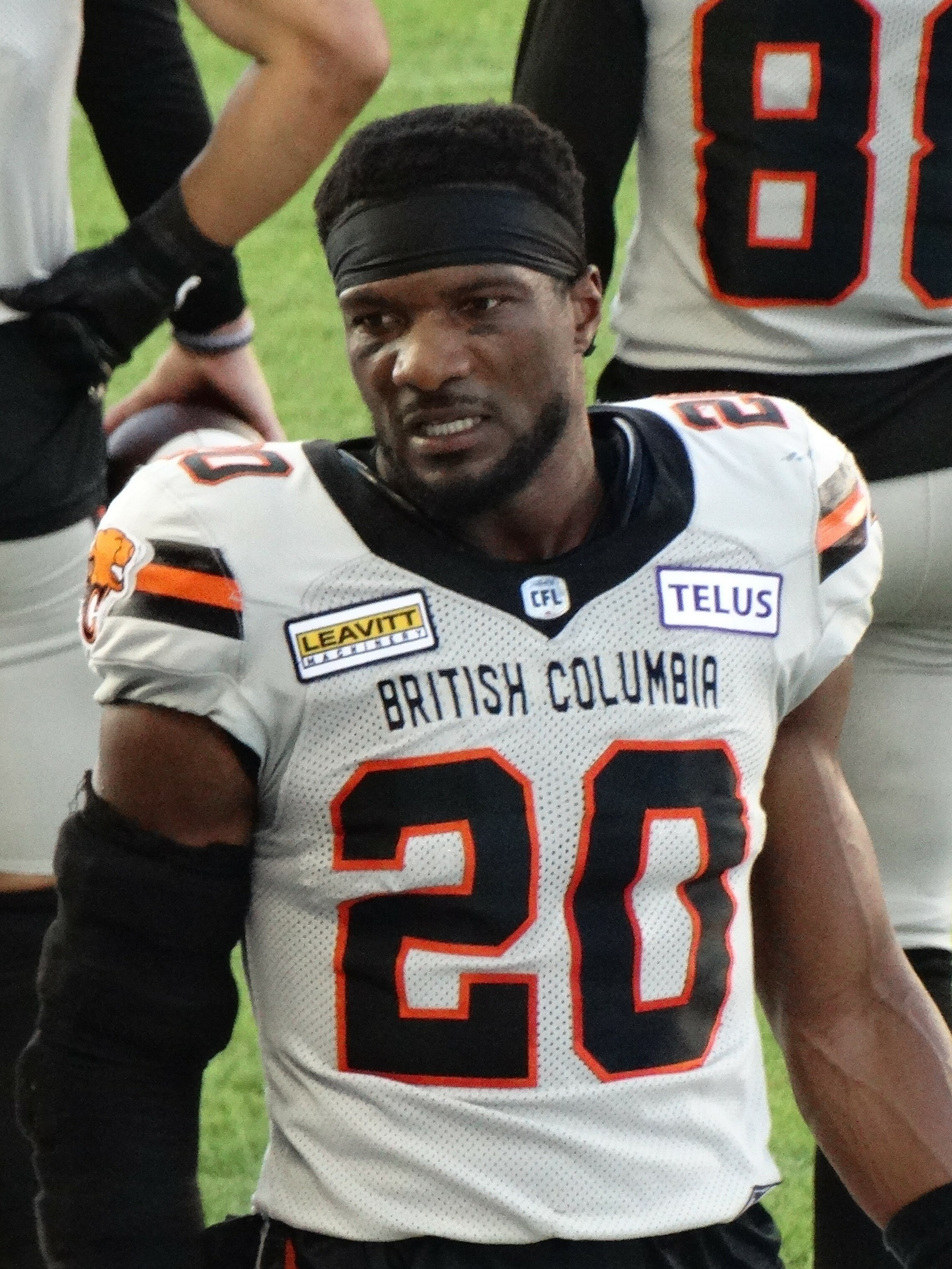
- Lokombo with the BC Lions in 2023

No. 8, 20
- Position: Linebacker

Personal information
- Born: October 15, 1990 (age 36); Kinshasa, Zaire
- Listed height: 6 ft 2 in (1.88 m)
- Listed weight: 231 lb (105 kg)

Career information
- High school: Abbotsford (BC) W. J. Mouat
- College: Oregon
- NFL draft: 2014: undrafted
- CFL draft: 2013: 3rd round, 21st overall pick

Career history
- BC Lions (2014–2016); Baltimore Ravens (2017)*; Oakland Raiders (2017)*; San Francisco 49ers (2017–2018)*; BC Lions (2018); Montreal Alouettes (2019); Toronto Argonauts (2020)*; BC Lions (2021–2024)
- * Offseason or practice squad member only

Awards and highlights
- CFL's Most Outstanding Canadian Award - (2021); Dr. Beattie Martin Trophy - (2021); CFL West All-Star (2015)

Career CFL statistics
- Total tackles: 462
- Sacks: 17
- Stats at CFL.ca
- Stats at Pro Football Reference

Boseko Lokombo (born October 15, 1990) is a Congolese-Canadian former professional Canadian football linebacker. During his career from 2014 to 2024, Lokombo played nine seasons in the Canadian Football League (CFL), eight of them with the BC Lions. He played college football at Oregon. Lokombo has also been a member of the Montreal Alouettes and Toronto Argonauts of the CFL, and the Baltimore Ravens, Oakland Raiders and San Francisco 49ers of the National Football League (NFL).

== Early life ==
Lokombo was born in Kinshasa, Zaire, but moved to Montreal, Quebec in 1996. Lokombo was raised in Abbotsford, British Columbia, where he attended W. J. Mouat Secondary School. As a senior, he recorded 47 tackles with four interceptions and also played wide receiver and running back. He ran for 1,556 yards on 107 carries (14.54 avg.) and 22 touchdowns, and caught 37 passes for 728 yards. He was named the Provincial AAA Eastern Conference All-Star Offensive MVP. He played his junior prep season at South Eugene High School in Eugene, Oregon where he recorded more than 50 tackles.

Considered a three-star recruit by Rivals.com, he was rated as the 27th best outside linebacker prospect of his class.

== Professional career ==
=== BC Lions (first stint) ===
In the Canadian Football League's Amateur Scouting Bureau final rankings, he was ranked as the best player for players eligible in the 2013 CFL draft. Because he was a probable National Football League draft selection in 2014, his CFL draft stock fell, leading him to be drafted in the third round, 21st overall, by his hometown BC Lions. He returned to play with the Oregon Ducks for the 2013 season, but went undrafted and unsigned in the NFL. He signed with the BC Lions on September 8, 2014. Joining the Lions midway through the season, Lokombo spent one game on the injured list before being activated to the Lions' 46-man roster and appearing in the final seven regular season games as well as the post-season. Seeing action exclusively on special teams, he recorded nine tackles on the year, which was seventh place on the club.

In 2015, Lokombo saw action mostly on special teams. He recorded 26 defensive tackles (12th on the team), despite limited action. He got his first CFL sack on a missed snap in a game at Hamilton. Bo Lokombo led the league on special teams with 24 tackles, earning his first CFL West All-star.

The Lions granted early free agent status to Lokombo so he could pursue an NFL opportunity.

=== Baltimore Ravens ===
On January 31, 2017, Lokombo signed a reserve/future contract with the Baltimore Ravens. He was waived on September 2 and was signed to the Ravens' practice squad the next day. He was released on September 26.

=== Oakland Raiders ===
On September 28, 2017, Lokombo was signed to the Oakland Raiders' practice squad. He was released on October 10.

=== San Francisco 49ers ===
On November 29, 2017, Lokombo was signed to the San Francisco 49ers' practice squad. He signed a reserve/future contract with the 49ers on January 2, 2018. Lokombo was released on April 30.

=== BC Lions (second stint) ===
On May 7, 2018, the Lions announced that Lokombo would be returning to the CFL, having signed a new contract to play for the Lions. He recorded 71 defensive tackles, 16 special teams tackles, four sacks, and two interceptions in 18 regular season games.

=== Montreal Alouettes ===
On the first day of free agency in 2019, Lokombo signed a one-year contract with the Montreal Alouettes. He played in 15 regular season games where he had 51 defensive tackles, 8 special teams tackles, and two interceptions as he split time between linebacker and safety.

=== Toronto Argonauts ===
Lokombo was traded to the Toronto Argonauts on January 31, 2020. He did not play in 2020 due to the cancellation of the 2020 CFL season and was released by the Argonauts on January 31, 2021.

=== BC Lions (third stint) ===
On the day following his Toronto release, Lokombo returned to the Lions on February 1, 2021. He scored his first career touchdown on a 20-yard interception return on September 11 against the Ottawa Redblacks. Lokombo played in all 14 regular season games and finished with 66 defensive tackles, 11 special teams tackles, four sacks, three interceptions, one forced fumble, and one touchdown. For his strong season, he was named the CFL's Most Outstanding Canadian.

On January 21, 2025, Lokombo announced his retirement from professional football.
