= 2020 Saskatchewan Roughriders season =

CFL team season

- General manager: Jeremy O'Day
- Head coach: Craig Dickenson
- Home stadium: Mosaic Stadium

Results
- Record: N/A
- Division place: N/A, West
- Playoffs: Season cancelled

The 2020 Saskatchewan Roughriders season was scheduled to be the 63rd season for the team in the Canadian Football League (CFL). It would have been the club's 111th year overall, and its 105th season of play. This would have been the second season under head coach Craig Dickenson and general manager Jeremy O'Day.

Training camps, pre-season games, and regular season games were initially postponed due to the COVID-19 pandemic in Saskatchewan. The CFL announced on April 7, 2020 that the start of the 2020 season would not occur before July 2020. On May 20, 2020, it was announced that the league would likely not begin regular season play prior to September 2020. On August 17, 2020 however, the season was officially cancelled due to COVID-19.

== CFL national draft ==
The 2020 CFL National Draft took place on April 30, 2020. The Roughriders had seven selections in the eight-round draft. The team forfeited their third-round pick after selecting Jake Bennett in the 2019 Supplemental Draft. The Roughriders also traded their second-round pick to the Montreal Alouettes in a trade for Philip Blake and Patrick Lavoie. They regained a selection in the trade for Zach Collaros to Toronto.

Round	Pick	Player	Position	University team	Hometown
1	7	Mattland Riley	OL	Saskatchewan	Melfort, SK
4	30	Kian Schaffer-Baker	WR	Guelph	Mississauga, ON
4	35	Junior Allen	LB	Guelph	Burlington, ON
5	44	Vincent Dethier	DB	McGill	Boisbriand, QC
6	53	Jonathan Femi-Cole	RB	Western	Vaughan, ON
7	62	Jesse Lawson	OL	Carleton	Surrey, BC
8	71	Neville Gallimore	DL	Oklahoma	Ottawa, ON

=== CFL global draft ===
The 2020 CFL global draft was scheduled to take place on April 16, 2020. However, due to the COVID-19 pandemic, this draft and its accompanying combine were postponed to occur just before the start of training camp, which was ultimately cancelled. The Roughriders were scheduled to select seventh in each round with the number of rounds never announced.

== Planned schedule ==
=== Preseason ===
Week	Game	Date	Kickoff	Opponent	TV	Venue
A	Bye					
B	1	Sat, May 30	2:00 p.m. CST	at Calgary Stampeders	NA	McMahon Stadium
C	2	Fri, June 5	7:30 p.m. CST	vs. Winnipeg Blue Bombers	NA	Mosaic Stadium

=== Regular season ===
Week	Game	Date	Kickoff	Opponent	TV	Venue
1	Bye					
2	1	Fri, June 19	7:00 p.m. CST	vs. Montreal Alouettes	TSN/RDS	Mosaic Stadium
3	2	Thu, June 25	5:30 p.m. CST	at Hamilton Tiger-Cats	TSN	Tim Hortons Field
4	3	Sat, July 4	7:30 p.m. CST	vs. BC Lions	TSN	Mosaic Stadium
5	4	Sat, July 11	5:00 p.m. CST	vs. Toronto Argonauts	TSN	Mosaic Stadium
6	Bye					
7	5	Sat, July 25	2:00 p.m. CST	Toronto Argonauts	TSN	Huskies Stadium
8	6	Thu, July 30	7:00 p.m. CST	vs. Ottawa Redblacks	TSN	Mosaic Stadium
9	7	Sat, Aug. 8	8:00 p.m. CST	vs. BC Lions	TSN	Mosaic Stadium
10	8	Thu, Aug. 13	5:00 p.m. CST	at Montreal Alouettes	TSN/RDS	Molson Stadium
11	9	Sat, Aug 22	5:00 p.m. CST	vs. Edmonton Football Team	TSN	Mosaic Stadium
12	10	Sat, Aug. 29	5:00 p.m. CST	at Edmonton Football Team	TSN	Commonwealth Stadium
13	11	Sun, Sep 6	5:00 p.m. CST	vs. Winnipeg Blue Bombers	TSN	Mosaic Stadium
14	12	Sat, Sept 12	2:00 p.m. CST	at Winnipeg Blue Bombers	TSN	IG Field
15	13	Fri, Sept 18	8:00 p.m. CST	vs. Calgary Stampeders	TSN	Mosaic Stadium
16	14	Sat, Sept 26	8:00 p.m. CST	at BC Lions	TSN	BC Place
17	15	Sat, Oct 3	5:00 p.m. CST	at Edmonton Football Team	TSN	Commonwealth Stadium
18	16	Sat, Oct 10	2:00 p.m. CST	at Ottawa Redblacks	TSN	TD Place Stadium
19	Bye					
20	17	Sat, Oct 24	5:00 p.m. CST	vs. Hamilton Tiger-Cats	TSN	Mosaic Stadium
21	18	Fri, Oct 30	7:30 p.m. CST	at Calgary Stampeders	TSN	McMahon Stadium

== Team ==
=== Roster ===
Saskatchewan Roughriders roster
**Quarterbacks**: 7 Cody Fajardo; 2 James Franklin; 14 Justice Hansen; 16 Isaac Harker; **Receivers**: 84 Demarcus Ayers; 1 Shaquelle Evans; 82 Rashad Greene; 83 Jake Harty; 80 Carlos Henderson; 19 Brayden Lenius; 18 Justin McInnis; 88 Paul McRoberts; 85 Kyran Moore; 81 Mitchell Picton; 77 Randy Satterfield; 8 Kenny Stafford; 76 Xavier Ubosi; 17 Jordan Williams-Lambert; 86 Max Zimmermann	**Running backs**: 27 Kienan LaFrance; 22 Jeremy Langford; 25 Jamal Morrow; 29 William Powell; 38 David Savard; 20 Atlee Simon; 32 Terry Swanson; 42 Xavier Turner; **Fullbacks**: 41 Albert Awachie; 87 Patrick Lavoie; **Offensive linemen**: 62 Lanard Bonner; 63 René Brassea; 67 Dan Clark; 58 Takoby Cofield; 75 Logan Ferland; 61 Cameron Jefferson; 68 Devon Johnson; 66 Cyrus Kouandjio; 57 Brendon LaBatte; 51 Vincent Roy; 69 Braden Schram; 64 Dakoda Shepley; 59 Josiah St. John; 65 Terran Vaughn	**Defensive linemen**: 99 Mathieu Breton; 98 Charbel Dabire; 92 Zack Evans; 97 Jeremy Faulk; 91 Chad Geter; 70 Demetrius Harris; 74 Makana Henry; 39 Charleston Hughes; 6 A. C. Leonard; -- Chris Livings; 78 Kelcey Quarles; 90 Jordan Reaves; 93 Pete Robertson; 94 Sterling Shippy; 95 Cory Thomas; -- Trenton Thompson; **Linebackers**: 45 Alexandre Chevrier; 47 Deshaun Davis; 10 Solomon Elimimian; 49 Oluwaseun Idowu; 48 Gary Johnson Jr.; 4 Cameron Judge; 40 Deon Lacy; -- Nakas Onyeka; 43 Micah Teitz; 50 Matthew Thomas	**Defensive backs**: 0 Elie Bouka; 30 Blace Brown; 22 Shamar Busby; 38 Christian Campbell; 25 Hamp Cheevers; 33 Jacob Dearborn; 15 Mike Edem S; 31 Otha Foster; 11 Ed Gainey; 35 A. J. Hendy; 37 Jacob Janke; 24 Tony Lippett; 3 Nick Marshall; 21 L. J. McCray; 26 Tevin Mitchell; 28 Loucheiz Purifoy; 32 Zach Sanchez; 20 Damon Webb; **Special teams**: 46 Jorgen Hus LS; 12 Brett Lauther K; 9 Jon Ryan P
Italics indicate American player • **Bold** indicates Global player • 90 Roster; Roster updated 2020-08-17 • Depth chart • Transactions

=== Coaching staff ===
Saskatchewan Roughriders staff
**Front office**: President and ceo – Craig Reynolds; General manager and vice president of football operations – Jeremy O'Day; Assistant general manager – Paul Jones; Director of player personnel – Kyle Carson; Director of football operations – Ryan Pollock; Football operations coordinator – Jordan Greenly; U.S. Scout – Ron Selesky; Director of athletic therapy – Ivan Gutfriend; Manager of equipment – Gordon Gilroy; **Head coaches**: Head coach – Craig Dickenson; **Offensive coaches**: Offensive coordinator – Jason Maas; Offensive line – Stephen Sorrells; Receivers – Travis Moore; Running backs – Tim Prinsen; Offensive assistant – Josh Lambert	**Defensive coaches**: Defensive coordinator – Jason Shivers; Defensive line – Vacant; Linebackers – Deion Melvin; Defensive backs – Richard Kent; **Special teams coaches**: Special teams coordinator – Craig Dickenson; Special teams assistant – Kent Maugeri; **Strength and conditioning**: Strength and conditioning coordinator – Clinton Spencer; → Coaching staff
