= 2019 Saskatchewan Roughriders season =

CFL team season

- General manager: Jeremy O'Day
- Head coach: Craig Dickenson
- Home stadium: Mosaic Stadium

Results
- Record: 13–5
- Division place: 1st, West
- Playoffs: Lost West Final
- Team MOP: Cody Fajardo
- Team MOC: Cameron Judge
- Team MOR: Dakoda Shepley

The 2019 Saskatchewan Roughriders season was the 62nd season for the team in the Canadian Football League (CFL). It was the club's 110th year overall and its 104th season of play. The Roughriders qualified for the playoffs for the third consecutive year and hosted a playoff game for the second consecutive year. They finished 13–5 in the regular season (their best record since 1970) and finished first place in the West Division for only the second time since 1976 and the first time winning the West Division crown since 2009. The 2019 West Final was the first time that the game was held at the new Mosaic Stadium and the second time a playoff game was held at the venue, the first coming during the previous season in 2018.

This was Craig Dickenson's first season as head coach and Jeremy O'Day's first full season as general manager following the sudden departure of Chris Jones, who held both roles for the previous three years.

== Offseason ==
=== Foreign drafts ===
For the first time in its history, the CFL held drafts for foreign players from Mexico and Europe. Like all other CFL teams, the Roughriders held three non-tradeable selections in the 2019 CFL–LFA draft, which took place on January 14, 2019. The 2019 European CFL draft took place on April 11, 2019 where all teams held one non-tradeable pick.

Draft	Round	Pick	Player	Position	School/Club team
LFA	1	6	René Brassea	OL	Fundidores de Monterrey
LFA	2	15	Carlos Olvera	WR	UDLAP
LFA	3	24	Francisco García	CB	Fundidores de Monterrey
Euro	1	6	Max Zimmermann	WR	Potsdam Royals

=== CFL draft ===
The 2019 CFL draft took place on May 2, 2019. The Roughriders had six selections in the eight-round draft after trading their third-round pick in a package for Vernon Adams and their seventh-round pick for Brian Jones.

Round	Pick	Player	Position	School/Club team
1	6	Justin McInnis	WR	Arkansas State
2	15	Brayden Lenius	WR	New Mexico
4	35	Jacob Janke	LB	York
5	44	Charbel Dabire	DL	Wagner
6	53	Vincent Roy	OL	Sherbrooke
8	71	Christopher Judge	DL	Cal Poly

== Preseason ==
Week	Game	Date	Kickoff	Opponent	Results		TV	Venue	Attendance	Summary
Week	Game	Date	Kickoff	Opponent	Score	Record	TV	Venue	Attendance	Summary
A	Bye									
B	1	Fri, May 31	7:00 p.m. CST	at Calgary Stampeders	L 1–37	0–1	TSN	McMahon Stadium	NA	Recap
C	2	Thurs, June 6	7:00 p.m. CST	vs. Winnipeg Blue Bombers	L 29–35	0–2	None	Mosaic Stadium	28,706	Recap

# Games played with white uniforms.

== Regular season ==
=== Standings ===
West Division
Team	GP	W	L	T	Pts	PF	PA	Div	Stk	
Saskatchewan Roughriders	18	13	5	0	26	487	386	7–3	W3	Details
Calgary Stampeders	18	12	6	0	24	482	407	8–2	W1	Details
Winnipeg Blue Bombers	18	11	7	0	22	508	409	7–3	W1	Details
Edmonton Eskimos	18	8	10	0	16	406	400	3–7	L2	Details
BC Lions	18	5	13	0	10	411	452	0–10	L3	Details

=== Schedule ===
To accommodate for the viewership of the Toronto Raptors' 7:00pm CST NBA Finals Game 6 start time on June 13, the CFL moved up the start time of the league opener that same day from 5:30pm to 5:00pm.

In the late evening of August 9 at 9:06pm EDT, a weather delay was declared at Percival Molson Memorial Stadium in Montreal due to an approaching thunderstorm with intense lightning; the Roughriders were leading the Alouettes 17–10 with 2:41 left in the 3rd quarter. Because the game had not restarted by 10:06pm EDT and over 7:30 had been played in the 3rd at that point, the game was decided to be official and the 17–10 score was declared final.

The Roughriders played an unusually long three game road trip in October to accommodate the National Hockey League's Heritage Classic which was staged at Mosaic Stadium for the first time.

Week	Game	Date	Kickoff	Opponent	Results		TV	Venue	Attendance	Summary
Week	Game	Date	Kickoff	Opponent	Score	Record	TV	Venue	Attendance	Summary
1	1	Thu, June 13	5:00 p.m. CST	at Hamilton Tiger-Cats	L 17–23	0–1	TSN/RDS	Tim Hortons Field	22,287	Recap
2	2	Thu, June 20	5:30 p.m. CST	at Ottawa Redblacks	L 41–44	0–2	TSN/RDS	TD Place Stadium	23,453	Recap
3	3	Mon, July 1	5:00 p.m. CST	vs. Toronto Argonauts	W 32–7	1–2	TSN/RDS2	Mosaic Stadium	30,121	Recap
4	4	Sat, July 6	8:00 p.m. CST	vs. Calgary Stampeders	L 10–37	1–3	TSN	Mosaic Stadium	29,147	Recap
5	Bye									
6	5	Sat, July 20	5:00 p.m. CST	vs. BC Lions	W 38–25	2–3	TSN	Mosaic Stadium	31,602	Recap
7	6	Sat, July 27	5:00 p.m. CST	at BC Lions	W 45–18	3–3	TSN	BC Place	20,950	Recap
8	7	Thu, Aug 1	7:30 p.m. CST	vs. Hamilton Tiger-Cats	W 24–19	4–3	TSN	Mosaic Stadium	29,516	Recap
9	8	Fri, Aug 9	5:00 p.m. CST	at Montreal Alouettes	W 17–10	5–3	TSN/RDS	Molson Stadium	16,580	Recap
10	Bye									
11	9	Sat, Aug 24	5:00 p.m. CST	vs. Ottawa Redblacks	W 40–18	6–3	TSN/RDS	Mosaic Stadium	32,328	Recap
12	ǁ 10 ǁ	Sun, Sep 1	1:00 p.m. CST	vs. Winnipeg Blue Bombers	W 19–17	7–3	TSN	Mosaic Stadium	33,356	Recap
13	11	Sat, Sept 7	2:00 p.m. CST	at Winnipeg Blue Bombers	L 10–35	7–4	TSN	IG Field	33,134	Recap
14	ǁ 12 ǁ	Sat, Sept 14	5:00 p.m. CST	vs. Montreal Alouettes	W 27–25	8–4	TSN/RDS	Mosaic Stadium	30,205	Recap
15	Bye									
16	13	Sat, Sept 28	5:00 p.m. CST	at Toronto Argonauts	W 41–16	9–4	TSN	BMO Field	12,406	Recap
17	14	Sat, Oct 5	5:00 p.m. CST	vs. Winnipeg Blue Bombers	W 21–6	10–4	TSN	Mosaic Stadium	31,080	Recap
18	15	Fri, Oct 11	7:30 p.m. CST	at Calgary Stampeders	L 28–30	10–5	TSN	McMahon Stadium	30,210	Recap
19	16	Fri, Oct 18	8:00 p.m. CST	at BC Lions	W 27–19	11–5	TSN	BC Place	18,043	Recap
20	17	Sat, Oct 26	5:00 p.m. CST	at Edmonton Eskimos	W 27–24	12–5	TSN	Commonwealth Stadium	29,228	Recap
21	18	Sat, Nov 2	2:00 p.m. CST	vs. Edmonton Eskimos	W 23–13	13–5	TSN/RDS2	Mosaic Stadium	29,156	Recap

# Games played with primary home uniforms.
# Games played with white uniforms.
ǁ # ǁ Games played with retro alternate uniforms.

== Post-season ==
=== Schedule ===
Game	Date	Kickoff	Opponent	Results		TV	Venue	Attendance	Summary
Game	Date	Kickoff	Opponent	Score	Record	TV	Venue	Attendance	Summary
West Semi-Final	Bye								
ǁ West Final ǁ	Sun, Nov 17	3:30 p.m. CST	vs. Winnipeg Blue Bombers	L 13–20	0–1	TSN/RDS/ESPN2	Mosaic Stadium	33,300	Recap

ǁ # ǁ Games played with retro alternate uniforms.

== Roster ==
2019 Saskatchewan Roughriders final roster
**Quarterbacks**: 6 Bryan Bennett; 7 Cody Fajardo; 16 Isaac Harker; **Running backs**: 32 Alexandre Gagné; 27 Kienan LaFrance; 29 William Powell; 8 Marcus Thigpen; **Receivers**: 84 Emmanuel Arceneaux; 1 Shaq Evans; 87 Patrick Lavoie; 18 Justin McInnis; 85 Kyran Moore; 82 Naaman Roosevelt; 5 Kenny Stafford; 19 Cory Watson	**Offensive linemen**: 53 Philip Blake G; 63 René Brassea G/T; 67 Dan Clark C; 68 Thaddeus Coleman T; 57 Brendon LaBatte G; 64 Dakoda Shepley G; 65 Terran Vaughn T; **Defensive linemen**: 98 Charbel Dabire DT; 93 Chad Geter DE; 74 Makana Henry DT; 39 Charleston Hughes DE; 2 Micah Johnson DT; 99 A.C. Leonard DE	**Linebackers**: 45 Alexandre Chevrier; 35 Dyshawn Davis; 10 Solomon Elimimian; 48 Gary Johnson; 4 Cameron Judge; 42 Derrick Moncrief; 43 Micah Teitz; **Defensive backs**: 0 Elie Bouka; 33 Jacob Dearborn; 15 Mike Edem; 11 Ed Gainey; 3 Nick Marshall; 21 L. J. McCray; 28 Loucheiz Purifoy; 14 Denzel Radford	**Special teams**: 46 Jorgen Hus LS; 12 Brett Lauther K; 9 Jon Ryan P; **Practice roster**: 22 Shamar Busby DB; 26 Jhavonte Dean DB; 75 Logan Ferland G/C; 38 Javier Garcia DB; 61 Cameron Jefferson T; 88 Paul McRoberts WR; 25 Jamal Morrow RB; 81 Mitchell Picton WR; 69 Braden Schram G; 94 Sterling Shippy DT; 20 Atlee Simon RB; 86 Max Zimmermann WR	**Injured list**: 41 Albert Awachie FB; 52 Brandyn Bartlett LB; 54 Jake Bennett G; 66 Dariusz Bladek G; 30 Blace Brown DB; 58 Takoby Cofield T; 95 Lavar Edwards DT; 92 Zack Evans DT; 97 Jeremy Faulk DT; 3 Jake Harty WR; 80 Carlos Henderson WR; 31 Sam Hurl LB; 49 Oluwaseun Idowu LB; 89 Brayden Lenius SB; 90 Jordan Reaves DE; 17 Jordan Williams-Lambert WR; Italics indicate American player **Bold** indicate Global player

== Coaching staff ==
Saskatchewan Roughriders Staff
Front office: President and ceo – Craig Reynolds; General manager and vice president of football operations – Jeremy O'Day; Assistant general manager – Paul Jones; Director of football operations – Ryan Pollock; Football operations coordinator – Jordan Greenly; U.S. Scout – Ron Selesky; Director of athletic therapy – Ivan Gutfriend; Manager of equipment – Gordon Gilroy; Head coaches: Head coach – Craig Dickenson; Assistant head coach – Stephen McAdoo; Offensive coaches: Offensive coordinator – Stephen McAdoo; Quarterbacks – Steve Walsh; Offensive line – Stephen Sorrells; Receivers – Travis Moore; Running backs – Kent Maugeri	Defensive coaches: Defensive Coordinator & Defensive Backs – Jason Shivers; Linebackers – Chris Tormey; Assistant defensive backs – Richard Kent; Defensive assistant – Mike Davis; Special teams coaches: Special teams coordinator – Craig Dickenson; Special teams assistant – Terry Eisler; Strength and conditioning: Strength and conditioning coordinator – Clinton Spencer; → Coaching staff
