= 2021 Saskatchewan Roughriders season =

CFL team season

- General manager: Jeremy O'Day
- Head coach: Craig Dickenson
- Home stadium: Mosaic Stadium

Results
- Record: 9–5
- Division place: 2nd, West
- Playoffs: Lost West Final
- Team MOP: Cody Fajardo
- Team MODP: Loucheiz Purifoy
- Team MOC: Micah Teitz
- Team MOOL: Dan Clark
- Team MOST: Brett Lauther
- Team MOR: Kian Schaffer-Baker

The 2021 Saskatchewan Roughriders season was the 63rd season for the team in the Canadian Football League (CFL). It was the club's 112th year overall, and its 105th season of play. Although the club failed to record a second consecutive first place finish in the West Division, the Roughriders qualified for the post-season for the fourth consecutive season of play on October 30, 2021 following a win over the Montreal Alouettes. After defeating the Calgary Stampeders in the West Semi-Final, the Roughriders then lost the West Final to the Winnipeg Blue Bombers for the second consecutive season. This was the second season under head coach Craig Dickenson and general manager Jeremy O'Day.

An 18-game season schedule was originally released on November 20, 2020, but it was announced on April 21, 2021 that the start of the season would likely be delayed until August and feature a 14-game schedule. On June 15, 2021, the league released the revised 14-game schedule with regular season play beginning on August 5, 2021.

== Offseason ==
=== CFL global draft ===
The 2021 CFL global draft took place on April 15, 2021. The Roughriders selected fifth in each round of the snake draft.

| Round | Pick | Player | Position | University/Club Team | Nationality |
|---|---|---|---|---|---|
| 1 | 5 | Christopher Ezeala | RB | Ingolstadt Dukes | Germany |
| 2 | 14 | Kaare Vedvik | P | Marshall | Norway |
| 3 | 23 | Jon Henry Nell | K | N/A | South Africa |
| 4 | 32 | Sebastien Sagne | REC | Frankfurt Universe | Finland |

== CFL national draft ==
The 2021 CFL draft took place on May 4, 2021. The Roughriders had six selections in the six-round snake draft and had the second pick in odd rounds and the eighth pick in even rounds.

| Round | Pick | Player | Position | University team | Hometown |
|---|---|---|---|---|---|
| 1 | 2 | Nelson Lokombo | DB | Saskatchewan | Abbotsford, BC |
| 2 | 17 | Terrell Jana | WR | Virginia | Vancouver, BC |
| 3 | 20 | Bruno Labelle | TE | Cincinnati | Montreal, QC |
| 4 | 35 | Alain Cimankinda | DL | Guelph | Gatineau, QC |
| 5 | 38 | Logan Bandy | OL | Calgary | Calgary, AB |
| 6 | 53 | Matt Watson | DB | Mount Allison | Brampton, ON |

== Preseason ==
Due to the shortening of the season, the CFL confirmed that pre-season games would not be played in 2021.

=== Planned schedule ===
| Week | Game | Date | Kickoff | Opponent | TV | Venue |
|---|---|---|---|---|---|---|
| A | Bye | | | | | |
| B | 1 | Fri, May 28 | 6:30 p.m. CST | at Winnipeg Blue Bombers | NA | IG Field |
| C | 2 | Fri, June 5 | 7:00 p.m. CST | vs. Winnipeg Blue Bombers | NA | Mosaic Stadium |

== Regular season ==
=== Standings ===
West Division
| Team | GP | W | L | T | Pts | PF | PA | Div | Stk | |
|---|---|---|---|---|---|---|---|---|---|---|
| Winnipeg Blue Bombers | 14 | 11 | 3 | 0 | 22 | 351 | 187 | 8–1 | L2 | Details |
| Saskatchewan Roughriders | 14 | 9 | 5 | 0 | 18 | 290 | 285 | 5–4 | L1 | Details |
| Calgary Stampeders | 14 | 8 | 6 | 0 | 16 | 315 | 263 | 6–4 | W3 | Details |
| BC Lions | 14 | 5 | 9 | 0 | 10 | 313 | 351 | 2–7 | W1 | Details |
| Edmonton Elks | 14 | 3 | 11 | 0 | 6 | 246 | 377 | 2–7 | L1 | Details |

=== Schedule ===
The Roughriders initially had a schedule that featured 18 regular season games beginning on June 12 and ending on October 23. However, due to the COVID-19 pandemic in Canada, the Canadian Football League delayed the start of the regular season to August 5, 2021 and the Roughriders began their 14-game season on August 6, 2021.

| Week | Game | Date | Kickoff | Opponent | Results | | TV | Venue | Attendance | Summary |
| Week | Game | Date | Kickoff | Opponent | Score | Record | TV | Venue | Attendance | Summary |
|---|---|---|---|---|---|---|---|---|---|---|
| 1 | 1 | Fri, Aug 6 | 7:30 p.m. CST | BC Lions | W 33–29 | 1–0 | TSN | Mosaic Stadium | 32,975 | Recap |
| 2 | 2 | Sat, Aug 14 | 8:00 p.m. CST | Hamilton Tiger-Cats | W 30–8 | 2–0 | TSN/ESPNews | Mosaic Stadium | 27,076 | Recap |
| 3 | 3 | Sat, Aug 21 | 5:00 p.m. CST | Ottawa Redblacks | W 23–10 | 3–0 | TSN/RDS | Mosaic Stadium | 28,559 | Recap |
| 4 | Bye | | | | | | | | | |
| 5 | ǁ 4 ǁ | Sun, Sep 5 | 4:00 p.m. CST | Winnipeg Blue Bombers | L 8–23 | 3–1 | TSN/ESPNews | Mosaic Stadium | 32,975 | Recap |
| 6 | 5 | Sat, Sept 11 | 2:00 p.m. CST | @ Winnipeg Blue Bombers | L 9–33 | 3–2 | TSN | IG Field | 33,234 | Recap |
| 7 | 6 | Fri, Sept 17 | 7:45 p.m. CST | Toronto Argonauts | W 30–16 | 4–2 | TSN | Mosaic Stadium | 25,883 | Recap |
| 8 | 7 | Fri, Sept 24 | 8:30 p.m. CST | @ BC Lions | W 31–24 | 5–2 | TSN/ESPN2 | BC Place | 12,500 | Recap |
| 9 | 8 | Sat, Oct 2 | 5:00 p.m. CST | @ Calgary Stampeders | L 17–23 | 5–3 | TSN | McMahon Stadium | 25,516 | Recap |
| 10 | 9 | Sat, Oct 9 | 5:00 p.m. CST | Calgary Stampeders | L 19–22 | 5–4 | TSN | Mosaic Stadium | 27,964 | Recap |
| 11 | Bye | | | | | | | | | |
| 12 | 10 | Sat, Oct 23 | 7:45 p.m. CST | @ Calgary Stampeders | W 20–17 | 6–4 | TSN | McMahon Stadium | 21,672 | Recap |
| 13 | 11 | Sat, Oct 30 | 5:00 p.m. CST | @ Montreal Alouettes | W 19–14 | 7–4 | TSN/RDS | Molson Stadium | 11,817 | Recap |
| 14 | 12 | Fri, Nov 5 | 7:45 p.m. CST | @ Edmonton Elks | W 19–17 | 8–4 | TSN | Commonwealth Stadium^{1} | 24,115 | Recap |
| 15 | 13 | Sat, Nov 13 | 3:00 p.m. CST | Edmonton Elks | W 29–24 | 9–4 | TSN/RDS | Mosaic Stadium^{1} | 26,056 | Recap |
| 16 | 14 | Sat, Nov 20 | 3:00 p.m. CST | @ Hamilton Tiger-Cats | L 3–24 | 9–5 | TSN/RDS | Tim Hortons Field | 22,344 | Recap |

Notes

1. Saskatchewan was originally scheduled to host the first of their two games against Edmonton, but a COVID-19 outbreak affecting the Elks resulted in the League rescheduling a game originally scheduled for August 26 between Edmonton and Toronto. To help accommodate this change, the venues for the Roughriders' home-and-home series against the Elks have been reversed.

# Games played with primary home uniforms.
# Games played with white uniforms.
ǁ # ǁ Games played with retro alternate uniforms.

== Post-season ==
=== Schedule ===
| Game | Date | Kickoff | Opponent | Results | | TV | Venue | Attendance | Summary |
| Game | Date | Kickoff | Opponent | Score | Record | TV | Venue | Attendance | Summary |
|---|---|---|---|---|---|---|---|---|---|
| West Semi-Final | Sun, Nov 28 | 3:30 p.m. CST | Calgary Stampeders | W 33–30 (OT) | 1–0 | TSN/RDS/ESPNews | Mosaic Stadium | 24,001 | Recap |
| West Final | Sun, Dec 5 | 3:00 pm CST | @ Winnipeg Blue Bombers | L 17–21 | 1–1 | TSN/RDS/ESPN2 | IG Field | 31,160 | Recap |

# Games played with primary home uniforms.
# Games played with white uniforms.

== Roster ==
2021 Saskatchewan Roughriders final roster
| **Quarterbacks**: 7 Cody Fajardo; 8 Mason Fine; 16 Isaac Harker; **Running backs**: 41 Albert Awachie; 30 Alexandre Dupuis; 27 Kienan LaFrance; 25 Jamal Morrow; 29 William Powell; **Receivers**: 1 Shaq Evans; 83 Jake Harty; 19 Brayden Lenius; 88 Paul McRoberts; 81 Mitchell Picton; 89 Kian Schaffer-Baker; 14 Duke Williams | **Offensive linemen**: 68 Brett Boyko T; 67 Dan Clark C; 63 Logan Ferland G/C; 64 Evan Johnson G; 62 Andrew Lauderdale T; 59 Josiah St. John G; **Defensive linemen**: 97 Keion Adams DE; 98 Charbel Dabire DT; 31 Christopher Ezeala DE; 74 Makana Henry DT; 2 Micah Johnson DT; 91 Anthony Lanier DT; 6 A. C. Leonard DE; 93 Pete Robertson DE; 99 Jonathan Woodard DE | **Linebackers**: 28 Kevin Francis; 52 Nigel Harris; 58 Justin Herdman-Reed; 45 Deon Lacey; **Defensive backs**: 0 Elie Bouka; 37 Jeremy Clark; 11 Ed Gainey; 3 Nick Marshall; 32 Rolan Milligan; 26 Godfrey Onyeka; 5 Loucheiz Purifoy; 24 Damon Webb; **Special teams**: 46 Jorgen Hus LS; 12 Brett Lauther K; 70 Kaare Vedvik P | **Practice roster**: 66 Ka'John Armstrong T; 94 Alain Cimankinda DE; 95 Nick Coe DT; 84 Rashard Davis SB; 96 Nicholas Dheilly DE; 20 Marcus Murphy RB; 71 John Nell K; 49 Tyree Robinson DB; 42 Tegray Scales LB; 72 Ben Scruton P; **Suspended list**: 84 Sammie Coates WR; 58 Takoby Cofield T; 66 Seantrel Henderson T; 35 A. J. Hendy DB; 57 Brendon LaBatte G; 14 Tony Lippett DB; 4 Paxton Lynch QB; 21 L. J. McCray DB | **Injured list**: 95 Freddie Bishop DE; 22 Blace Brown DB; 38 Christian Campbell DB; 10 Larry Dean LB; 33 Jacob Dearborn DB; 76 Vincent Dethier DB; 15 Mike Edem DB; 47 Jonathan Femi-Cole RB; 42 DeMarquis Gates LB; 53 Jordan Herdman-Reed LB; 82 Terrell Jana SB; 61 Cameron Jefferson T; 48 Gary Johnson LB; 39 Alvin Jones LB; 21 Nelson Lokombo DB; 86 Ricardo Louis WR; 92 Garrett Marino DT; 18 Justin McInnis SB; 85 Kyran Moore SB; 50 Nakas Onyeka LB; 51 Michael Pinckney LB; 90 Jordan Reaves DE; 54 Mattland Riley G; 9 Jon Ryan P; 43 Micah Teitz LB; 65 Terran Vaughn T; 96 Tim Williams DE; 17 Jordan Williams-Lambert WR |
Italics indicate American player • **Bold** indicates Global player

== Coaching staff ==
Saskatchewan Roughriders staff
| Front office: President and ceo – Craig Reynolds; General manager and vice president of football operations – Jeremy O'Day; Assistant general manager – Paul Jones; Director of player personnel – Kyle Carson; Director of football operations – Ryan Pollock; Football operations coordinator – Jordan Greenly; U.S. Scout – Ron Selesky; Director of athletic therapy – Ivan Gutfriend; Manager of equipment – Gordon Gilroy; Head coaches: Head coach – Craig Dickenson; Offensive coaches: Offensive coordinator – Jason Maas; Offensive line – Stephen Sorrells; Receivers – Travis Moore; Running backs – Tim Prinsen; Offensive assistant – Josh Lambert | Defensive coaches: Defensive coordinator – Jason Shivers; Defensive line – Ben Olson; Linebackers – Deion Melvin; Defensive backs – Richard Kent; Special teams coaches: Special teams coordinator – Craig Dickenson; Special teams assistant – Kent Maugeri; Strength and conditioning: Strength and conditioning coordinator – Clinton Spencer; → Coaching staff |
