= Craig Dickenson =

Canadian gridiron football player and coach (born 1971)

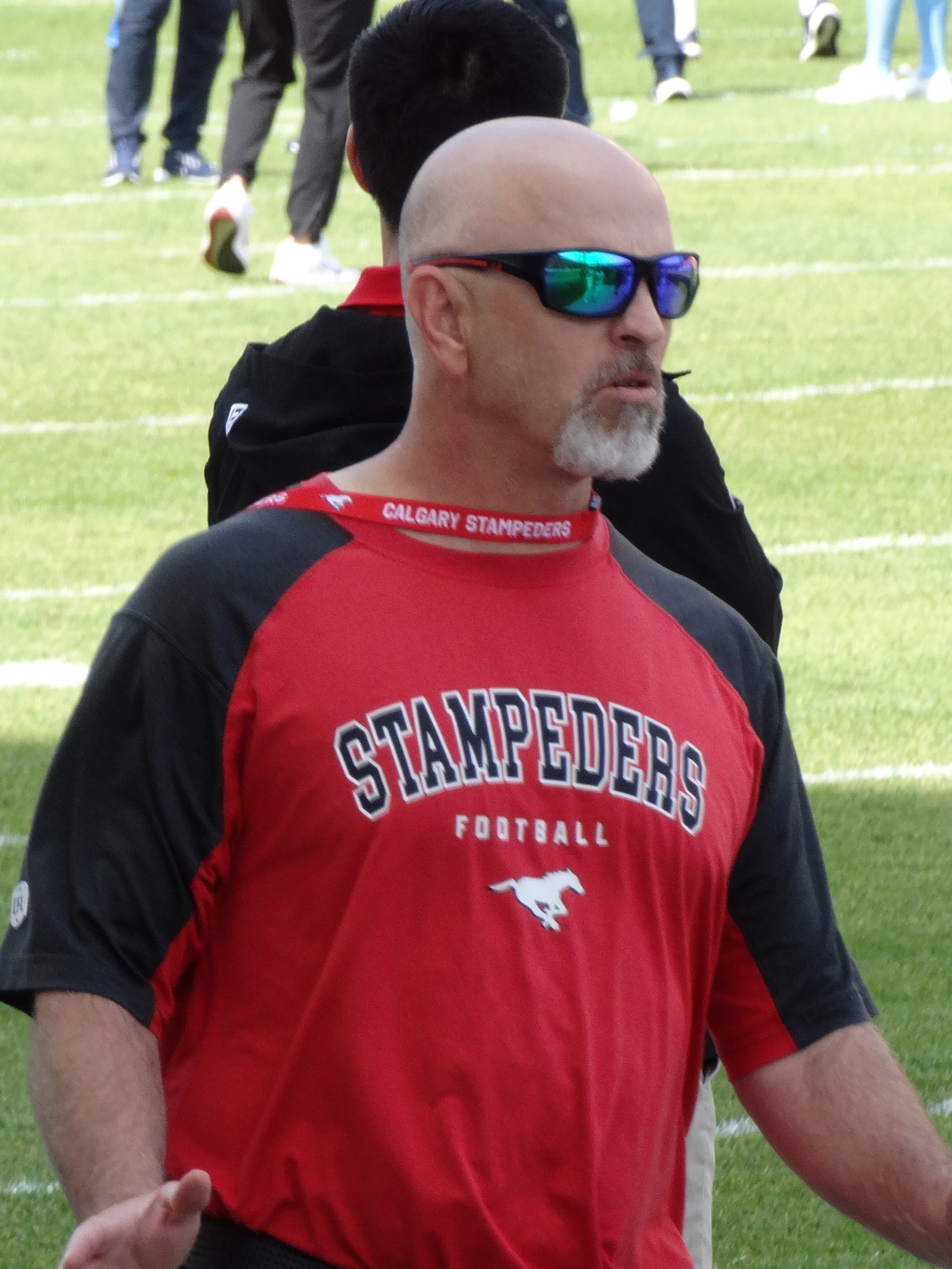
- Dickenson with the Calgary Stampeders in 2025

Calgary Stampeders
- Title: Special teams coordinator

Personal information
- Born: September 4, 1971 (age 55); Great Falls, Montana, U.S.

Career information
- College: Montana

Career history

Coaching
- 1995–1998: Montana (STC)
- 1999: Utah State (RBC)
- 2000–2001: San Diego Chargers (Ass. STC)
- 2002: Calgary Stampeders (RC)
- 2003: Montreal Alouettes (RBC)
- 2004: Calgary Stampeders (RBC)
- 2005–2009: Calgary Stampeders (STC)
- 2010: Oakland Raiders (Ass. STC)
- 2011–2012: Saskatchewan Roughriders (STC)
- 2013: Winnipeg Blue Bombers (STC)
- 2014–2015: Edmonton Eskimos (STC)
- 2016–2018: Saskatchewan Roughriders (STC)
- 2019–2023: Saskatchewan Roughriders (HC/STC)
- 2025–present: Calgary Stampeders (STC)

Operations
- 2024: Calgary Stampeders (Senior consultant)

Awards and highlights
- 2× Grey Cup champion (2008, 2015)

Craig Dickenson (born September 4, 1971) is a professional football coach who is the special teams coordinator for the Calgary Stampeders of the Canadian Football League (CFL). He has also served as the head coach for the Saskatchewan Roughriders for four seasons. He has coached professional football since 2000 and won a Grey Cup championship with the CFL's Calgary Stampeders in 2008 and with the Edmonton Eskimos in 2015.

== College career ==
Dickenson played college football as a kicker for the Montana Grizzlies.

== Coaching career ==
Dickenson was a Special Teams Assistant for the NFL's San Diego Chargers in 2000 and 2001.

Dickenson first coached in the Canadian Football League when he was hired by Wally Buono to be the receivers coach and offensive assistant for the CFL's Calgary Stampeders on March 25, 2002. In 2003, he moved to the CFL's Montreal Alouettes to be their Running Back Coach.

In 2004, Dickenson returned to Calgary to handle the receivers and running backs on the team's coaching staff. He was Calgary's Special Teams Coordinator for the 2005 and 2006 seasons. Prior to the 2007 season, the Stampeders announced that Dickenson had agreed to a contract extension to continue as the team's Special Teams Coordinator.

Calgary's new Head Coach, John Hufnagel, kept Dickenson as the team's Special Team's Coordinator for the 2008 season. Calgary won the Grey Cup that year, making Dickenson a Grey Cup champion for the first time. Dickenson remained as Calgary's Special Teams Coordinator for the 2009 season. He departed the team on December 8, 2009, having spent seven years with Calgary, the final five being in charge of Special Teams.

Dickenson was the Assistant Special Teams Coordinator with the NFL's Oakland Raiders for the 2010 season.

Dickenson was the Special Teams Coordinator of the CFL's Saskatchewan Roughriders for the 2011 season, and retained this position for the 2012 season. On January 3, 2013, Dickenson resigned as Special Teams Coordinator of the Saskatchewan Roughriders. The following day, he joined the CFL's Winnipeg Blue Bombers to be their Special Teams Coordinator for the 2013 season.

On January 28, 2014, new Edmonton Eskimos Head Coach, Chris Jones, announced that Dickenson was going to be the team's Special Teams Coordinator for the 2014 season. Dickenson retained this position on Jones' staff for the 2015 season, and Edmonton won the Grey Cup. This was the second time Dickenson was a Grey Cup champion.

Shortly after winning the Grey Cup, Chris Jones became the General Manager and Head Coach of the Saskatchewan Roughriders for the 2016 season. He brought most of his coaching staff from Edmonton to Saskatchewan, including Dickenson as Special Teams Coordinator. This marked Dickenson's second stint as Saskatchewan's Special Teams Coordinator. Dickenson remained in this position for the 2017 and 2018 seasons.

In January 2019, Jones resigned as Saskatchewan's General Manager and Head Coach to join the NFL's Cleveland Browns. Jeremy O'Day was named Saskatchewan's General Manager. Dickenson was one of the candidates O'Day interviewed for the Head Coach position, and Dickenson was subsequently promoted on January 25, 2019. The Riders finished 2019 with an improved record of 13–5, winning the West Division for the first time in a decade. Saskatchewan ultimately lost at home in the Western Final to the eventual Grey Cup champions, the Winnipeg Blue Bombers. Dickenson was nominated that year as the CFL West Division's Coach of the Year, finishing as runner-up to Hamilton's Orlondo Steinauer for the overall league award.

Dickenson signed a contract extension in December 2020, keeping him as Saskatchewan's Head Coach through the 2023 season. With Dickenson as Saskatchewan's Head Coach in 2021, the Riders finished second in the West Division, won their first home playoff game at new Mosaic Stadium, but once again lost to the eventual Grey Cup champion Winnipeg Blue Bombers in the Western Final. Saskatchewan started the 2022 season under Dickenson 4-1, but ultimately finished with a disappointing 6-12 record and failed to make the playoffs for the first time since 2016.

After the season, there was much speculation about the future of the Riders' coaching staff. However, on November 1, 2022, it was announced that Dickenson would return as head coach, while Offensive coordinator Jason Maas and two other offensive coaches were not retained by the team.

In 2023, after the Riders again posted a 6-12 record and missed the playoffs for a second straight season. The team announced they had opted not to renew Dickenson's contract on October 23, 2023.

On March 12, 2024, it was announced that Dickenson had joined the Calgary Stampeders as a senior consultant. After a year as a consultant, he returned to a coaching position when he was named the team's special teams coordinator on December 16, 2024.

=== CFL coaching record ===
Team	Year	Regular season					Postseason		
Team	Year	Won	Lost	Ties	Win %	Finish	Won	Lost	Result
SSK	2019	13	5	0	.722	1st in West Division	0	1	Lost in West Final
SSK	2020	Season Cancelled							
SSK	2021	9	5	0	.643	2nd in West Division	1	1	Lost in West Final
SSK	2022	6	12	0	.333	4th in West Division	-	-	Missed playoffs
SSK	2023	6	12	0	.333	4th in West Division	-	-	Missed playoffs
Total		34	34	0	.500	1 Division; Championship	1	2	

== Personal life ==
Dickenson is the older brother of Dave Dickenson, the General Manager and Head Coach for the Calgary Stampeders as of December 12, 2022. His mother, Sue Dickenson, is a former legislator in Montana.
