= Mitchell Picton =

Canadian gridiron football player (born 1995)

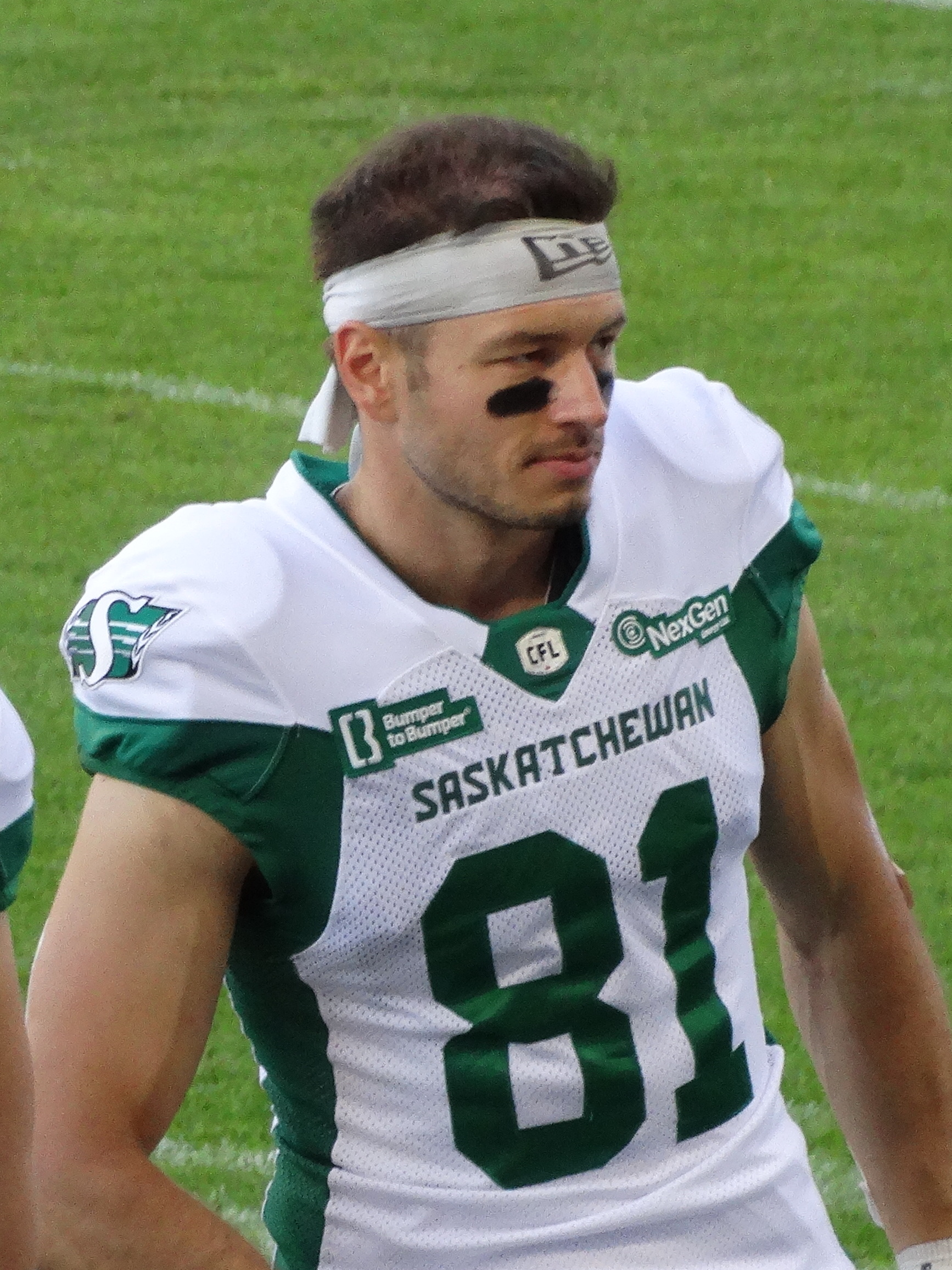
- Picton with the Saskatchewan Roughriders in 2025

No. 81
- Position: Wide receiver

Personal information
- Born: May 29, 1995 (age 31); Regina, Saskatchewan, Canada
- Listed height: 6 ft 2 in (1.88 m)
- Listed weight: 197 lb (89 kg)

Career information
- High school: Dr. Martin LeBoldus High
- University: Regina
- CFL draft: 2017: 5th round, 37th overall pick

Career history
- 2017: Saskatchewan Roughriders*
- 2018–2025: Saskatchewan Roughriders
- * Offseason or practice squad member only

Awards and highlights
- Grey Cup champion (2025)
- Stats at CFL.ca

Mitchell Picton (born May 29, 1995) is a Canadian former professional football wide receiver who played nine seasons with the Saskatchewan Roughriders of the Canadian Football League (CFL).

== University career ==
Picton played U Sports football for the Regina Rams from 2013 to 2017. He was named a Canada West All-Star and CIS First-Team All-Canadian in 2016 after leading the country with 11 receiving touchdowns. He returned to the team in 2017 to complete his last year of playing eligibility. After a five-year career, Picton finished as the Rams' all-time touchdown leader with 24 scored.

== Professional career ==
Pre-draft measurables
| Height | Weight | 40-yard dash | 20-yard shuttle | Three-cone drill | Vertical jump | Broad jump | Bench press |
|---|---|---|---|---|---|---|---|
| 6 ft 1 7/8 in (1.88 m) | 197 lb (89 kg) | 4.67 s | 4.21 s | 7.23 s | 29.5 in (0.75 m) | 9 ft 8 1/2 in (2.96 m) | 9 reps |
All values from CFL Combine

Picton was drafted in the fifth round, 37th overall, by his hometown Saskatchewan Roughriders and signed with the team on May 26, 2017. He spent training camp with the team in 2017, but returned to school to play one last year with the Regina Rams. After the Rams season ended on November 4, 2017, he was re-signed by the Roughriders on November 15, 2017 and was on the practice roster for the team's loss to the Toronto Argonauts in the East Final.

After re-signing with the Roughriders on December 12, 2017, Picton attended 2018 training camp with the team and spent the 2018 season on the practice roster. In 2019, he again began the season on the practice roster, but played in his first career professional game on July 27, 2019 against the BC Lions. He dressed in one other game that year against the Montreal Alouettes, but did not record any receptions in either game.

Picton did not play in 2020 due to the cancellation of the 2020 CFL season. He made the team's active roster following 2021 training camp and recorded his first career reception in the opening game on August 6, 2021 against the BC Lions. In the following week's game, on August 14, 2021, he scored his first career professional touchdown on an 8-yard pass from Cody Fajardo against the Hamilton Tiger-Cats.

Picton announced his retirement on May 1, 2026.

== Personal life ==
Picton's brother, Aaron, played for the Regina Rams from 2010 to 2015 and was drafted by the Calgary Stampeders in 2015. His cousin, Noah Picton, played for the Rams from 2013 to 2018 as the team's quarterback and was a member of the Toronto Argonauts.
