= Brayden Lenius =

Canadian gridiron football player (born 1996)

Profile
- Position: Wide receiver

Personal information
- Born: December 19, 1996 (age 29); Regina, Saskatchewan, Canada
- Listed height: 6 ft 5 in (1.96 m)
- Listed weight: 243 lb (110 kg)

Career information
- High school: Carson Graham Secondary; Chaminade College Preparatory
- College: Washington (2014–2017); New Mexico (2018)
- NFL draft: 2019: undrafted
- CFL draft: 2019: 2nd round, 15th overall pick

Career history
- Saskatchewan Roughriders (2019–2021); Atlanta Falcons (2022)*; Saskatchewan Roughriders (2022–2023); BC Lions (2025)*
- * Offseason or practice squad member only
- Stats at CFL.ca

Brayden Lenius-Dickey (born December 19, 1996) is a former Canadian professional football wide receiver. He played college football for the New Mexico Lobos and Washington Huskies. He has also been a member of the Atlanta Falcons of the National Football League (NFL) and the Saskatchewan Roughriders of the CFL.

== Early life ==
Lenius played for the Carson Graham Eagles in North Vancouver. He then moved to the Los Angeles area to play for the Chaminade College Eagles for his grade 12 year.

== College career ==
Lenius played college football for the Washington Huskies from 2014 to 2017. He did not play in 2016 and used a redshirt season. He graduated from the University of Washington and transferred to the University of New Mexico to play for the Lobos in 2018.

== Professional career ==
Pre-draft measurables
| Height | Weight | 40-yard dash | 20-yard shuttle | Three-cone drill | Vertical jump | Broad jump |
|---|---|---|---|---|---|---|
| 6 ft 5 1/8 in (1.96 m) | 243 lb (110 kg) | 4.75 s | 4.66 s | 7.62 s | 33.0 in (0.84 m) | 9 ft 6 7/8 in (2.92 m) |
All values from CFL Combine

=== Saskatchewan Roughriders ===
Heading into the 2019 CFL draft, Lenius was ranked by the CFL Central Scouting Bureau as the 11th best player available in the draft.

He was selected in the second round, 15th overall, by the Saskatchewan Roughriders and signed with the team on May 15, 2019. He played in his first professional game on July 6, 2019, against the Calgary Stampeders. Three weeks later, he recorded his first catch in a game against the BC Lions on July 27, 2021. Overall, he played in 11 regular season games for the Roughriders in 2019 where he had two receptions for four yards. He did not play in 2020 due to the cancellation of the 2020 CFL season.

In his sophomore season, Lenius made the team's opening day roster and scored his first career professional touchdown on a 12-yard pass from Cody Fajardo against the BC Lions on August 6, 2021. He had celebrated by throwing the ball into the stands, but the family that had caught the ball offered to return the keepsake to him. He finished the season having played in all 14 regular season games and recorded 37 receptions for 471 yards and four touchdowns. He also played in both post-season games where he had six catches for 43 yards. On January 7, 2022, Lenius was released one month prior to his contract expiring in order to pursue National Football League opportunities.

=== Atlanta Falcons ===
On January 10, 2022, Lenius signed a contract with the Atlanta Falcons of the National Football League. On July 28, 2022, he was waived.

=== Saskatchewan Roughriders ===
On August 29, 2022, Lenius re-signed with the Saskatchewan Roughriders. He played in seven games where he had 17 catches for 172 yards and one touchdown. He was limited by injuries in 2023 and played in just one regular season game where he recorded two catches for 12 yards. Lenius was part of final training camp cuts in 2024 and was released on June 1, 2024.

=== BC Lions ===
After going unsigned through the 2024 CFL season due to a foot injury, Lenius signed with the BC Lions on December 19, 2024. On May 7, 2025, Lenius announced his retirement from professional football, via his agent, as result of his previously injury failing to heal adequately enough to allow him to continue playing.

== Personal life ==
Lenius was born in Regina, Saskatchewan, to parents Shauna Lenius and Troy Dickey. He moved with his mother, Shauna, to Vancouver, British Columbia, following the divorce of his parents. Shauna played basketball for the Regina Cougars. Lenius' father, Troy, played at wide receiver for the Roughriders in 1995. Lenius had legally changed his last name to "Dickey" in December 2017. His father died on January 6, 2018, following a stroke he had suffered on December 28, 2017, in Glendale, Arizona, where he was staying to watch Lenius play in the 2017 Fiesta Bowl. Lenius' paternal grandfather, Eldridge Dickey, played at wide receiver for the Oakland Raiders for four years, but played quarterback for the Tennessee State Tigers. Lenius' maternal grandparents were season-ticket holders for the Roughriders for many years, but his grandfather, Jim Lenius, died five days before Brayden was selected in the 2019 CFL draft.
