= Chad Geter =

American gridiron football player (born 1990)

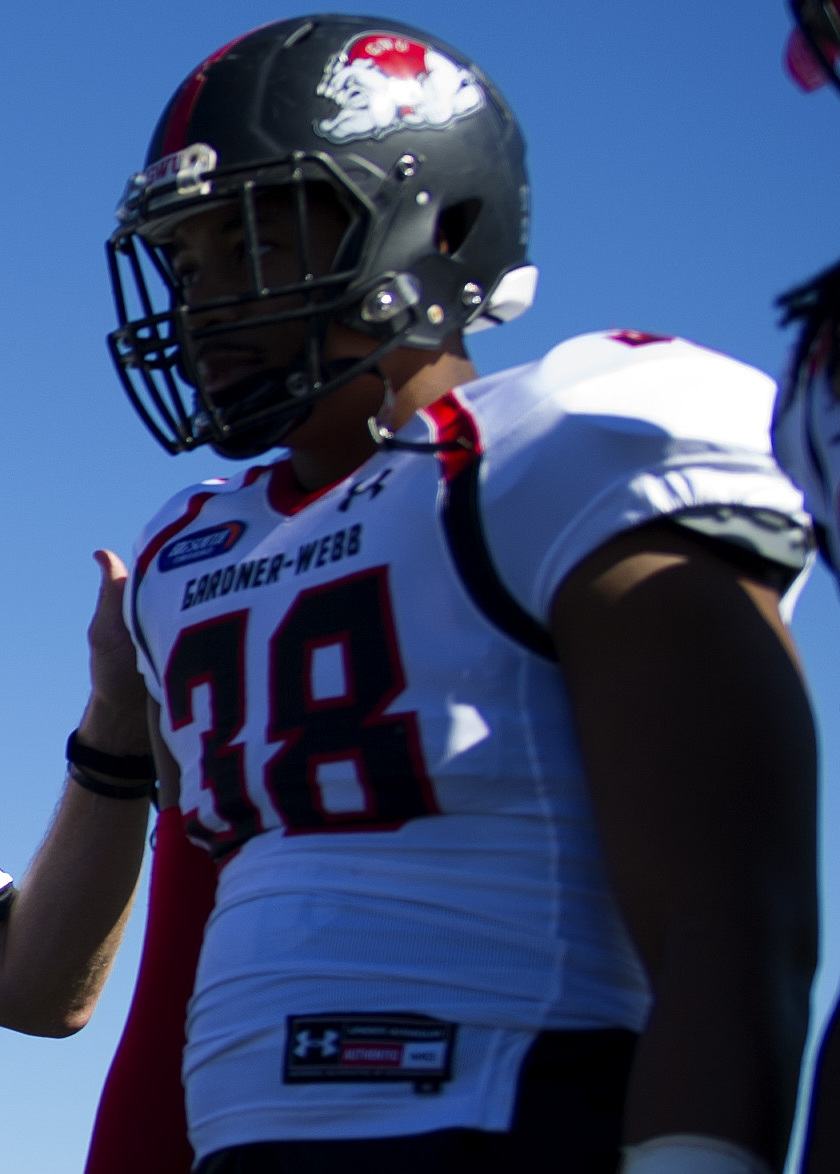
- Geter with Gardner–Webb in 2016

Profile
- Position: Defensive lineman

Personal information
- Born: July 19, 1994 (age 32); Irmo, South Carolina, U.S.
- Listed height: 6 ft 2 in (1.88 m)
- Listed weight: 253 lb (115 kg)

Career information
- High school: Dutch Fork
- College: Gardner–Webb
- NFL draft: 2017: undrafted

Career history
- 2018: Saskatchewan Roughriders
- 2019: Montreal Alouettes
- 2019–2020: Saskatchewan Roughriders
- Stats at CFL.ca

Chad Geter (born July 19, 1994) is a former professional Canadian football defensive lineman who played for two seasons in the Canadian Football League (CFL). He was a member of the Saskatchewan Roughriders and the Montreal Alouettes. He played college football for the Gardner-Webb Runnin' Bulldogs from 2012 to 2016.

== Professional career ==
=== Saskatchewan Roughriders ===
After going undrafted in the 2017 NFL draft, Geter signed with the Saskatchewan Roughriders in 2018. In his rookie year, he played in all 18 regular season games where he recorded 17 defensive tackles, 17 special teams tackles, three sacks, and one forced fumble. He also played in the team's West Semi-Final loss to the Winnipeg Blue Bombers where he had two defensive tackles. Despite the strong season, he was not retained in 2019 as he was part of the team's final training camp cuts on June 7, 2019.

=== Montreal Alouettes ===
Shortly after his release by the Roughriders, Geter signed with the Montreal Alouettes on June 11, 2019. He made his Alouettes debut on June 14, 2019, but spent the next six games on the injured list. He played in one more game in August before being released on September 10, 2019.

=== Saskatchewan Roughriders ===
Geter re-signed with the Roughriders on September 10, 2019. He played in six of the team's seven remaining regular season games that year where he had nine defensive tackles, two special teams tackles, and three sacks. He also played in the West Final playoff game which was another loss to the Blue Bombers. At the end of the year, on December 26, 2019, he signed a contract extension through to the 2021 season with the team. However, he did not play in 2020 due to the cancellation of the 2020 CFL season. On June 21, 2021, he announced his retirement from football in order to join the United States Air Force.
