= Braden Schram =

Canadian football player (born 1992)

Profile
- Position: Offensive lineman

Personal information
- Born: December 1, 1992 (age 33); Manning, Alberta, Canada
- Listed height: 6 ft 4 in (1.93 m)
- Listed weight: 310 lb (141 kg)

Career information
- High school: Paul Rowe High
- University: Calgary
- CFL draft: 2017: 2nd round, 13th overall pick

Career history
- 2017–2018: Hamilton Tiger-Cats
- 2018–2020: Saskatchewan Roughriders
- Stats at CFL.ca

Braden Mitchel Schram (born December 1, 1992) is a Canadian former professional football offensive lineman who played for the Hamilton Tiger-Cats and Saskatchewan Roughriders of the Canadian Football League (CFL).

== Early career ==
Schram attended Paul Rowe High School in Manning, Alberta, but since the school did not have a football program, he played at Peace River High for the Pioneers. Following graduation, he moved on to play U Sports football with the Calgary Dinos from 2013 to 2016. He started in 31 games for the Dinos while being named a 2015 First Team All-Canadian.

== Professional career ==
Pre-draft measurables
Height	Weight	40-yard dash	20-yard shuttle	Three-cone drill	Vertical jump	Broad jump	Bench press
6 ft 3 3/8 in (1.91 m)	311 lb (141 kg)	5.48 s	4.84 s	8.28 s	21.5 in (0.55 m)	8 ft 5 1/4 in (2.57 m)	22 reps
All values from CFL Combine

=== Hamilton Tiger-Cats ===
Schram was ranked as the 16th best player available in the 2017 CFL draft by the CFL's Central Scouting Bureau. He was then selected by the Hamilton Tiger-Cats with the 13th overall selection in the draft and signed with the team on May 24, 2017. He dressed in his first professional game on August 12, 2017 against the Winnipeg Blue Bombers while spending the rest of the 2017 season on the reserve roster and practice roster. In 2018, he spent the first two games of the season on the injured list before being released on June 28, 2018, reportedly due to the depth that the team had at his position.

=== Saskatchewan Roughriders ===
Soon after his release from Hamilton, Schram was signed by the Saskatchewan Roughriders on July 3, 2018. He dressed in the final two games of the regular season as well as the West Semi-Final loss to the Blue Bombers. He saw more playing time during the 2019 season as he dressed in 10 regular season games as a back-up offensive lineman. He signed a one-year contract extension with the Roughriders on December 19, 2020, but with the 2020 CFL season cancelled, it was announced on December 15, 2020, that he had been signed to another one-year extension with the team. He retired from football on June 21, 2021.
