= Jeremy O'Day =

American gridiron football player and administrator (born 1974)

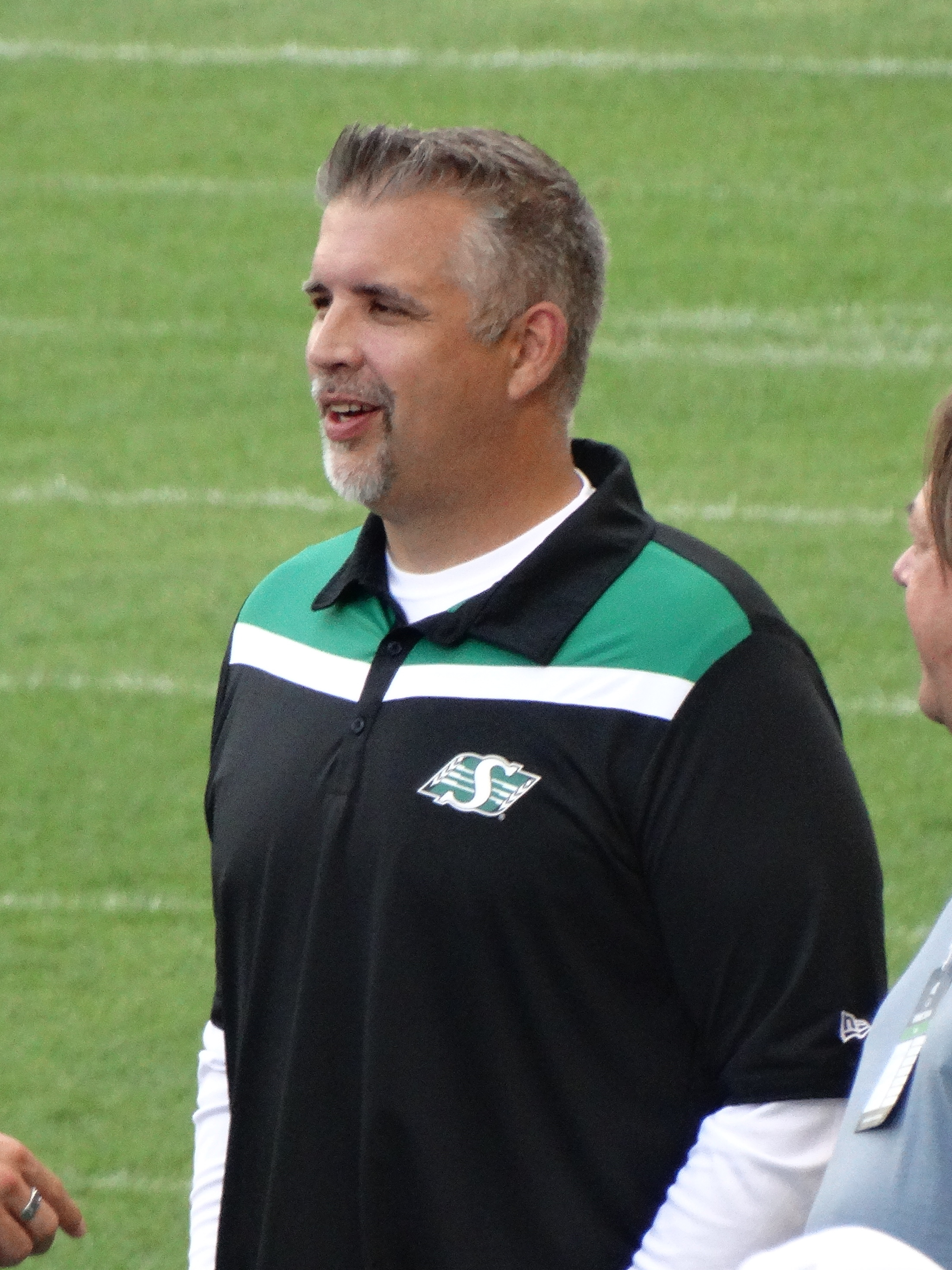
- O'Day with the Saskatchewan Roughriders in 2025

Saskatchewan Roughriders
- Title: General manager

Personal information
- Born: August 31, 1974 (age 52); Buffalo, New York, U.S.
- Listed height: 6 ft 3 in (1.91 m)
- Listed weight: 300 lb (136 kg)

Career information
- College: Edinboro

Career history

Playing
- 1997–1998: Toronto Argonauts
- 1999–2010: Saskatchewan Roughriders

Operations
- 2011: Saskatchewan Roughriders (Football Operations Coordinator)
- 2012–2014: Saskatchewan Roughriders (Assistant General Manager)
- 2015: Saskatchewan Roughriders (Assistant General Manager and Director of Football Operations)
- 2015: Saskatchewan Roughriders (Interim Vice President of Football Operations and General Manager)
- 2016–2018: Saskatchewan Roughriders (Assistant Vice president of Football Operations & Administration)
- 2019–present: Saskatchewan Roughriders (Vice President of Football Operations and General Manager)

Awards and highlights
- 4× Grey Cup champion (1997, 2007, 2013, 2025); 3× CFL All-Star (2006, 2007, 2009); 6× CFL West All-Star (2003, 2005, 2006, 2007, 2009, 2010); Tom Pate Memorial Award (2008)
- Stats at CFL.ca (archive)

Jeremy O'Day (born August 31, 1974) is an American professional football executive who is the current Vice President of Football Operations and General Manager for the Saskatchewan Roughriders of the Canadian Football League (CFL). He previously played in the CFL as an offensive lineman. O'Day played college football at Edinboro University in Pennsylvania.

== Early life ==
O'Day grew up in Lockport, New York, playing high school football at Lockport High School.

== College career ==
O'Day played football for the Edinboro Fighting Scots from 1993 to 1996, helping the team finish with a 30-12 record during that period. The team appeared in the NCAA Division II Playoffs in 1993 and 1995, and in 1995, won the PSAC West championship.

O'Day was inducted into the Edinboro University Athletics Hall of Fame in 2008.

== Professional career ==
O'Day's parents were born in Canada, specifically Kitchener, Ontario, meaning that O'Day would be classified as a Canadian in the CFL.

=== Toronto Argonauts ===
O'Day was selected by the Toronto Argonauts in the second round of the 1997 CFL Supplemental Draft, and signed with the team on May 28.

In 1997, O'Day dressed for all 18 regular season games, starting 2 and backing up for 16, and the East Division Final against the Montreal Alouettes. He also dressed for the Grey Cup game, and earned his first Grey Cup ring when the Argonauts defeated his future team, the Saskatchewan Roughriders, 47-23.

In 1998, O'Day once again dressed for all 18 regular season games, starting the first 2 and backing up for the final 16, as well as the team's East Division Semi-Final loss to Montreal.

He was granted free agency status on February 16, 1999.

=== Saskatchewan Roughriders ===
On February 26, 1999, O'Day signed with the Saskatchewan Roughriders.

In 1999, O'Day dressed for all 18 regular season games, starting 7 at right guard, and dressing as a backup offensive lineman for the other 11 games.

In 2000, he dressed for and started all 18 regular season games, starting 17 at centre and 1 at left tackle.

In 2001, O'Day dressed for and started all 18 regular season games, starting 15 at centre and 3 at left tackle. He was nominated as the Roughriders' Most Outstanding Offensive Lineman for the first time.

In 2002, he dressed for 13 regular season games, starting 2 at left tackle and 11 at centre; he missed 5 games with a knee injury. The Roughriders qualified for the playoffs for the first time since 1997, in the crossover to the East Division. O'Day started the East Semi-Final at centre against his former team, the Toronto Argonauts; the Roughriders lost 24-14.

In 2003, O'Day started all 18 regular season games at centre, and was named a CFL West Division All-Star for the first time. He also started at centre for the West Semi-Final against the Winnipeg Blue Bombers, the Roughriders' first playoff win since 1997, and the team's West Final loss to the Edmonton Eskimos.

In 2004, O'Day started at centre for all 18 regular season games, the West Semi-Final victory against Edmonton, and the West Final loss against the BC Lions.

In 2005, he started 13 games at centre and missed 5 games with a knee injury. The Roughriders qualified for the crossover, and he started at centre for the team's East Semi-Final loss to Montreal. O'Day was named a CFL West All-Star for the second time in his career.

In 2006, O'Day started at centre for all 18 regular season games, as well as the West Semi-Final win against the Calgary Stampeders, and the West Final loss against BC. He was nominated as the Roughriders' Most Outstanding Offensive Lineman for the second time in his career, was a CFL West All-Star for the third time, and a CFL All-Star for the first time. On December 13, the Roughriders announced that O'Day had signed a multi-year contract with the team.

On April 30, 2007, it was announced that O'Day was the inaugural recipient of the Roughriders' President’s Ring, presented by Frontier Peterbilt and voted upon by the players for his leadership on and off the field.

In 2007, O'Day started at centre for all 18 regular season games. He also started at centre for the West Semi-Final win against Calgary, which was the Roughriders' first home playoff game since 1988 and win since 1976, the West Final victory against BC, and the Grey Cup win against Winnipeg. This was O'Day's second Grey Cup victory. He was nominated as the Roughriders' Most Outstanding Offensive Lineman for the third time in his career, a CFL West All-Star for the fourth time, and a CFL All-Star for the second time.

In 2008, O'Day started the first 14 regular season games at centre, but missed the final 4 games due to injury. He was able to start at centre for the West Semi-Final, a loss to BC. He was the winner of the 2008 CFL season Tom Pate Memorial Award for community service.

In 2009, O'Day started all 18 regular season games at centre. He was named a CFL West All-Star for the fifth time, and a CFL All-Star for the third time. O'Day started at centre for the West Final against Calgary, which was the Roughriders' first home West Final game played and win since 1976. He also started the Grey Cup game at centre, which the Roughriders lost to Montreal.

In 2010, O'Day started all 18 regular season games at centre. He was nominated as the Roughriders' Most Outstanding Offensive Lineman for the fourth time, and was named a CFL West All-Star for the sixth time. O'Day also started at centre for the West Semi-Final, a win over BC, the West Final, a win over Calgary, and the Grey Cup, which Saskatchewan lost to Montreal for the second consecutive year.

O'Day announced his retirement as a player on February 8, 2011. During his career with the Roughriders, he dressed for 202 regular season games, and 238 overall in his 14 CFL seasons.

== Administrative career ==
=== Early roles ===
Upon retirement, O'Day joined the Roughrider front office as Football Operations Coordinator for the 2011 season.

In November 2011, O'Day was named Assistant General Manager of the Roughriders, holding this title from 2012 to 2014. In 2013, he won his third Grey Cup.

In February 2015, he signed a three-year contract extension to continue as Assistant General Manager, with Director of Football Operations added to his title. On August 31, 2015, O'Day took over as Interim Vice President of Football Operations and General Manager for the Roughriders after Brendan Taman was fired. The team went 3-6 during his interim tenure.

After the 2015 season, Chris Jones was hired as the Roughrider General Manager and Head Coach. In December 2015, O’Day was named Assistant Vice president of Football Operations & Administration under Jones, holding these titles for the 2016, 2017, and 2018 seasons.

In January 2019, Jones resigned from his roles with the Roughriders in order to pursue an NFL coaching opportunity.

=== General manager ===
On January 18, 2019, O'Day was named Roughrider Vice President of Football Operations and General Manager. In his first season in these roles, the Roughriders finished first place in the CFL West Division with 13 wins and 5 losses. The team lost the West Division Final at home to the Winnipeg Blue Bombers 20-13.

The 2020 CFL season was cancelled due to the COVID-19 pandemic. In December 2020, O’Day signed a contract extension through the 2023 season.

The 2021 season ended with the Roughriders finishing second place in the West Division with 9 wins and 5 losses. After a 33-30 double overtime victory at home in the West Semi-Final against the Calgary Stampeders, the Roughriders would once again lose to Winnipeg in the West Final, this time in Winnipeg, 21-17.

The 2022 Saskatchewan Roughriders started with 4 wins and 1 loss, but finished the season with 6 wins and 12 losses, and missed the playoffs for the first time since 2016.

O’Day returned for the 2023 season, and the Roughriders once again finished with 6 wins and 12 losses and missed the playoffs. After the season, the Roughriders offered him a three-year contract extension, to which he agreed.

== CFL GM record ==
Team	Year	Regular season					Postseason		
Team	Year	Won	Lost	Ties	Win %	Finish	Won	Lost	Result
SSK	2015	3	6	0	.333	5th in West Division	0	0	Interim - Missed Playoffs
SSK	2019	13	5	0	.722	1st in West Division	0	1	Lost in West Final
SSK	2020	Season Cancelled							
SSK	2021	9	5	0	.643	2nd in West Division	1	1	Lost in West Final
SSK	2022	6	12	0	.333	4th in West Division	0	0	Missed playoffs
SSK	2023	6	12	0	.333	4th in West Division	0	0	Missed playoffs
SSK	2024	9	8	1	.528	2nd in West Division	1	1	Lost in West Final
SSK	2025	12	6	0	.667	1st in West Division	2	0	Won 112th Grey Cup
Total		58	54	1	.518	2 Division; Championships	4	3	1 Grey Cup
