= Kyle Carson =

Kyle Carson is a Canadian football executive who is the assistant general manager for the Saskatchewan Roughriders of the Canadian Football League (CFL).

== Career ==
Carson was hired by the CFL's Calgary Stampeders as an intern in 2012 before serving as the Scouting Assistant and Coordinator of Football Operations. He was later promoted to Scout and CFL Draft Coordinator. During his time in Calgary, the Stampeders won two Grey Cup championships (2014 and 2018).

After the 2019 CFL season, Carson joined the Saskatchewan Roughriders as Director of Player Personnel, and was promoted to assistant general manager before the 2022 CFL season.
