= Cody Fajardo =

American football player

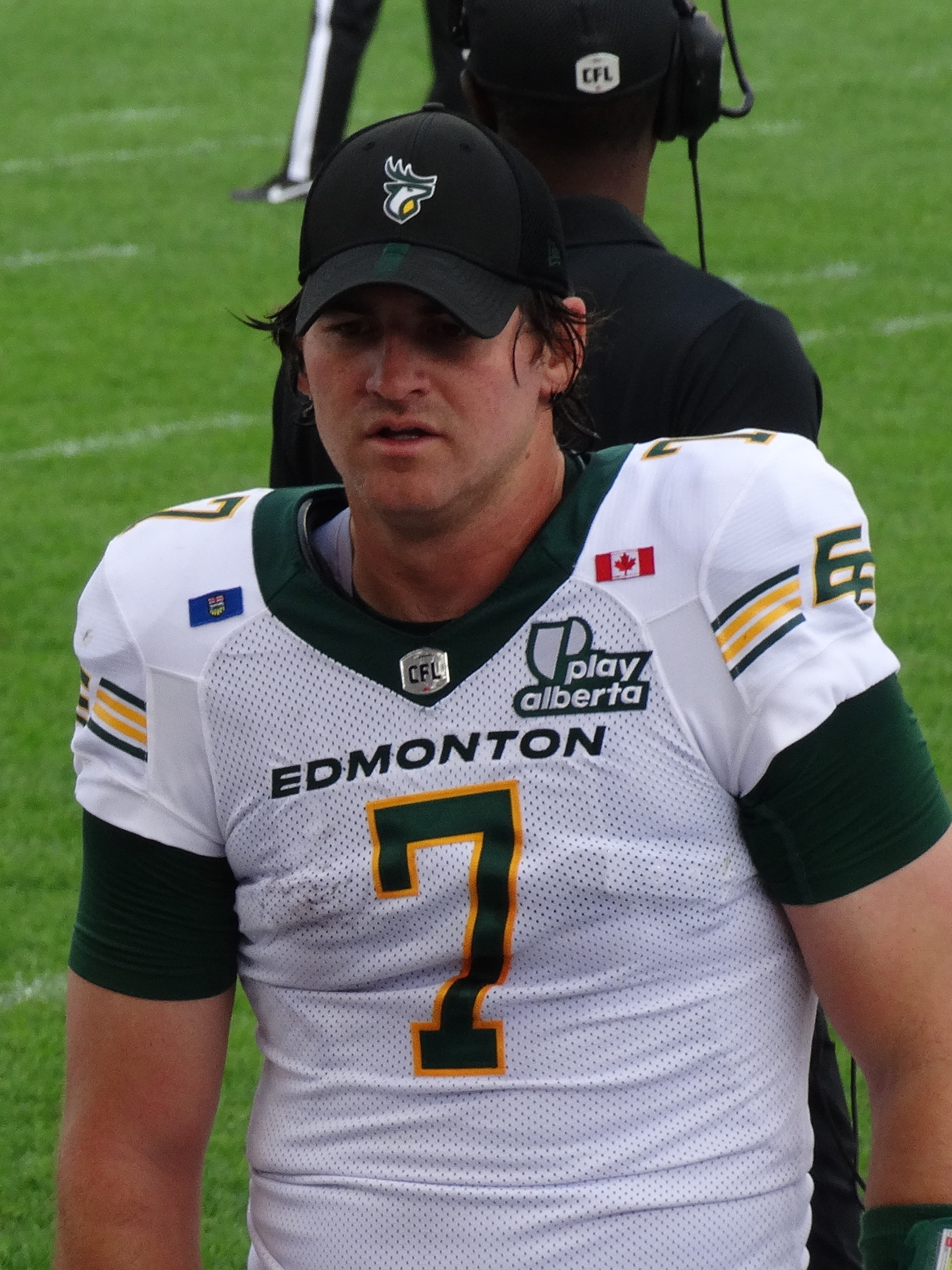
- Fajardo with the Edmonton Elks in 2025

No. 7 – Edmonton Elks
- Position: Quarterback
- Roster status: Active
- CFL status: American

Personal information
- Born: March 29, 1992 (age 34); Brea, California, U.S.
- Listed height: 6 ft 1 in (1.85 m)
- Listed weight: 215 lb (98 kg)

Career information
- High school: Servite (Anaheim, California)
- College: Nevada (2010–2014)
- NFL draft: 2015: undrafted

Career history
- Oakland Raiders (2015)*; Toronto Argonauts (2015–2017); BC Lions (2018); Saskatchewan Roughriders (2019–2022); Montreal Alouettes (2023–2024); Edmonton Elks (2025–present)
- * Offseason or practice squad member only

Awards and highlights
- 3× Grey Cup champion (2017, 2023, 2026); 2× Grey Cup Most Valuable Player (2023, 2026); Jeff Nicklin Memorial Trophy (2019); CFL All-Star (2019); CFL West All-Star (2019); CFL passing yards leader (2019); WAC Freshman of the Year (2011)

Career CFL statistics as of 2026
- Passing completions: 2,193
- Passing attempts: 3,089
- Passing yards: 26,194
- TD–INT: 122–69
- Rushing touchdowns: 56
- Stats at CFL.ca
- Stats at Pro Football Reference

Cody Michael Fajardo (born March 29, 1992) is an American professional football quarterback for the Edmonton Elks of the Canadian Football League (CFL). He played college football for the Nevada Wolf Pack. He has also played in the CFL with the Toronto Argonauts, BC Lions, Saskatchewan Roughriders, and Montreal Alouettes. He was the MVP of the 110th Grey Cup in 2023 and the 113th Grey Cup in 2026.

== Early life ==
Fajardo was born in Brea, California, United States. He played high school football for Servite High School in Anaheim, California. As a senior, he led Servite to a state championship and a No. 3 ranking in the national polling. He won the Glenn Davis Award in 2009 as the best high school football player in California.

Fajardo's father played college football for the Texas Tech Red Raiders, and his grandfather played for the Colorado Buffaloes.

== College career ==
Fajardo committed to the University of Nevada, Reno in late January 2010. He was redshirted during the 2010 season as Colin Kaepernick completed a four-year run as the starting quarterback for the Nevada Wolf Pack football team.

As a redshirt freshman, Fajardo became the starting quarterback for 2011 Nevada Wolf Pack football team. Playing against Texas Tech in the third game of the 2011 season, Fajardo rushed for 139 yards and two touchdowns on 10 carries and completed four of six passes for 59 yards and a touchdown. On October 15, 2011, he led the Wolfpack to a 49–7 win over New Mexico, running for two touchdowns and completing 20 of 25 passes for 203 yards. He finished 2011 with 1,707 passing yards, 6 passing touchdowns and 694 rushing yards and 11 rushing touchdowns.

Fajardo had 2,786 passing yards, 20 passing touchdowns, 1,121 rushing yards, and 12 rushing touchdowns. In 2013, he passed 2,668 yards, 13 passing touchdowns, 621 rushing yards and eight touchdowns. As a senior in 2014, he passed for 2,498 yards and 18 passing touchdowns and rushed for 1,046 yards and 13 touchdowns. Fajardo accounted for 101 touchdowns in his career at Nevada.

Fajardo became the second player in NCAA history with 9,000 yards passing and 3,000 yards rushing, the first having been Colin Kaepernick, another alumnus of the University of Nevada, Reno. Fajardo was inducted into the Nevada Athletics Hall of Fame in 2024.

== Professional career ==
Pre-draft measurables
Height	Weight	Arm length	Hand span	Wingspan	40-yard dash	10-yard split	20-yard split	20-yard shuttle	Three-cone drill	Vertical jump	Broad jump
6 ft 1 1/2 in (1.87 m)	223 lb (101 kg)	31 3/8 in (0.80 m)	9 1/2 in (0.24 m)	6 ft 5 in (1.96 m)	4.63 s	1.62 s	2.70 s	4.10 s	6.95 s	32.5 in (0.83 m)	9 ft 10 in (3.00 m)
All values from NFL Combine

=== Oakland Raiders ===
After going undrafted in the 2015 NFL draft, Fajardo signed with the Oakland Raiders on May 8, 2015. On September 1, he was waived by the Raiders.

=== Toronto Argonauts ===
On October 8, 2015, Fajardo was signed to the practice roster of the Toronto Argonauts of the Canadian Football League. He re-signed with the Argonauts on May 17, 2016. Fajardo scored his first professional rushing touchdown on July 13, 2016, before throwing his first professional touchdown pass on July 25, 2016. Fajardo's role expanded in 2017 into a change-of-pace backup while starter Ricky Ray was injured. After Ray returned, Fajardo returned to his role as short-yardage quarterback. He scored the game-winning touchdown with 23 seconds remaining in the 2017 East Final in short-yardage on a 1-yard plunge against the Saskatchewan Roughriders, sending the Argonauts to the 105th Grey Cup game. The Argos won the championship game over the Calgary Stampeders.

=== BC Lions ===
After entering free agency, Fajardo signed with the BC Lions on February 16, 2018. Fajardo continued his role as a short down rusher and change of pace quarterback behind Travis Lulay and Jonathon Jennings, registering 14 completions on 20 attempts for 153 yards, one touchdown, and one interception, as well as 42 rushes for 108 yards and 5 more scores.

=== Saskatchewan Roughriders ===
On the third day of free agency in 2019, Fajardo signed with the Saskatchewan Roughriders on a one-year contract, joining a quarterback room featuring Zach Collaros and David Watford. Fajardo became the starting quarterback following an injury to Collaros in the opening game of the season. Fajardo threw for 360 yards in his first start for the Roughriders, setting a franchise record for most yards in a first start. He led the team to a win on July 1, 2019, throwing for 430 yards against the Toronto Argonauts. Fajardo continued to play well in the following weeks which prompted the Roughriders to trade Collaros to the Argonauts, solidifying their trust in Fajardo. On October 21, 2019. Fajardo agreed to a two-year contract extension with Saskatchewan. He signed a contract extension through the 2022 season with the team on January 5, 2021. Fajardo remained the starting quarterback for the Riders in 2021, leading the team to 9–5 record and secured a home playoff match against rival Calgary Stampeders, whom they defeated 33–30 in overtime despite Fajardo throwing four interceptions. The Riders were defeated in the Western Final by the eventual champions the Winnipeg Blue Bombers. On January 31, 2022, Fajardo and the Roughriders agreed to a restructured contract for the 2022 season. After starting the season with four wins in their first five games the season proved to be challenging for Fajardo and the Riders as the team would go on to lose nine of their next 11 matches, culminating in Fajardo being benched for the Riders penultimate match. On February 13, 2023, one day before becoming a free agent, Fajardo posted on Twitter announcing that he would not be returning to Saskatchewan.

=== Montreal Alouettes ===
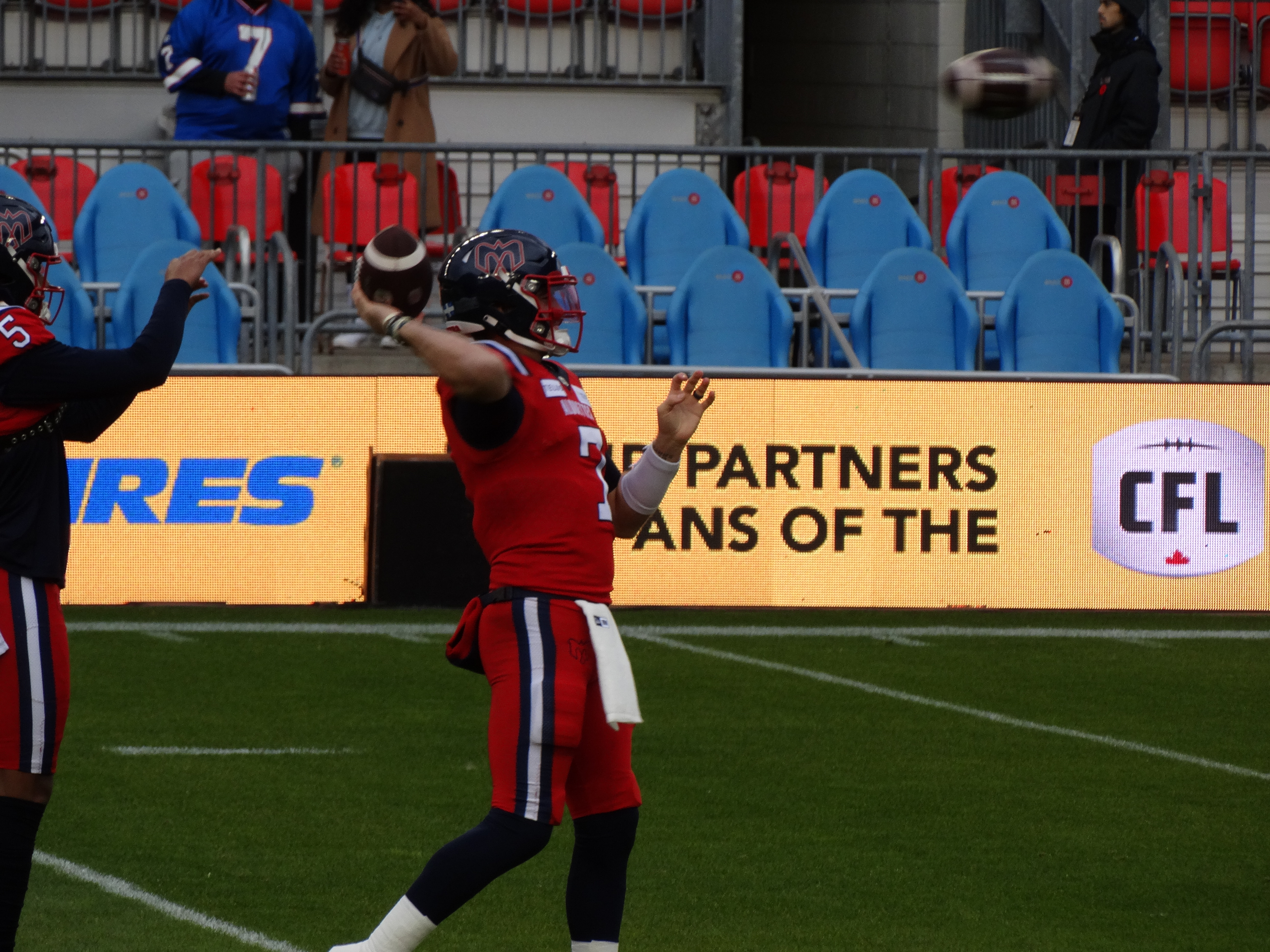
Fajardo with the Alouettes in 2023

On the first day of free agency Fajardo signed a two-year contract with the Montreal Alouettes. Coincidentally, Trevor Harris, the Alouettes' starter in 2022, replaced Fajardo in Saskatchewan. Fajardo had a 9–7 record as a starter and helped the Alouettes to a playoff spot as runners-up in the East Division. The Alouettes reached the 110th Grey Cup, in which Fajardo was named the game's Most Valuable Player. He threw three touchdowns in the championship game, including the winning score to Tyson Philpot with 13 seconds remaining.

Fajardo returned as the Alouettes' starter in 2024, winning his first five games before suffering an injury in the team's sixth game against the Toronto Argonauts. Fajardo missed the next four games before returning to the starting role, sharing starts and playing time with Davis Alexander as the Alouettes went 12–5–1 and received a bye to the East Final. In the East Final, Fajardo threw for 330 yards and three touchdowns but was also intercepted twice and lost a fumble as the Alouettes lost 30–28 to the Argonauts. Following the season, Alexander was given a three-year extension, signaling the Alouettes' commitment to move on from Fajardo as their starter.

=== Edmonton Elks ===
On December 17, 2024, it was announced that Fajardo had been traded to the Edmonton Elks in exchange for McLeod Bethel-Thompson. Fajardo began the 2025 season as the short-yardage quarterback and the backup to starter Tre Ford. After the Elks began the year with a 1–4 record, Fajardo was named the starter; he started the remaining 13 games, going 6–7 as a starter and passing for 3,408 yards, 14 touchdowns and 7 interceptions. Fajardo signed a one-year contract extension after the season and was named the Elks' starter heading into 2026. He threw for a career-high 4,788 yards and 25 touchdowns during the 2026 regular season. He led the Elks to a victory in the 113th Grey Cup, where he was named the game's MVP after totaling four touchdowns in the 37–30 victory over his former team in the Alouettes.

== Career statistics ==
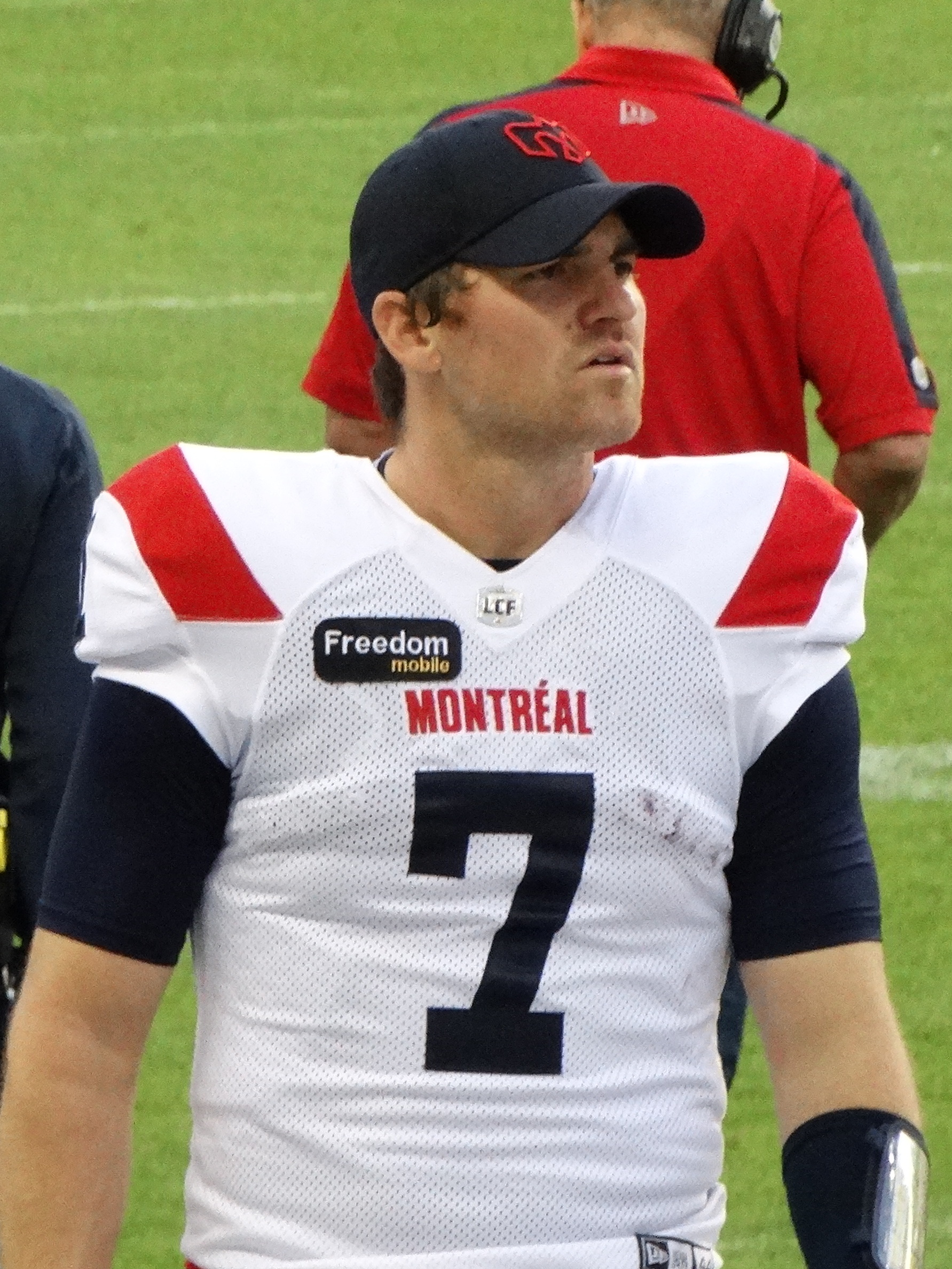
Fajardo in 2024

=== CFL ===
Legend
	Won the Grey Cup
	Grey Cup MVP
	Led the league
**Bold**	Career high

==== Regular season ====
Year	Team	Games			Passing								Rushing			
Year	Team	GD	GS	Record	Cmp	Att	Pct	Yds	Y/A	TD	Int	Rtg	Att	Yds	Y/A	TD
2016	TOR	8	0	—	11	18	61.1	107	5.9	2	0	**114.8**	21	89	4.2	3
2017	TOR	**18**	0	—	18	30	60.0	154	5.1	2	0	95.7	59	240	4.1	5
2018	BC	**18**	0	—	14	20	70.0	153	7.7	1	1	88.1	42	108	2.6	5
2019	SSK	**18**	**16**	12–4	338	473	71.5	4,302	**9.1**	18	8	105.2	**107**	**611**	5.7	**10**
2020	SSK	Season cancelled														
2021	SSK	13	13	9–4	281	404	69.6	2,970	7.4	14	11	90.9	78	468	**6.0**	4
2022	SSK	17	15	6–9	282	401	69.8	3,360	8.4	16	**13**	95.4	81	357	4.4	8
2023	MTL	**18**	**16**	9–7	322	454	70.9	3,862	8.5	15	12	96.6	57	341	**6.0**	3
2024	MTL	14	13	7–5–1	268	364	**73.6**	3,105	8.5	16	7	105.6	51	277	5.4	3
2025	EDM	18	13	6–7	282	385	73.2	3,408	8.9	14	7	104.6	55	319	5.8	7
2026	EDM	18	17	**13–4**	**382**	**551**	69.3	**4,788**	8.7	**25**	10	103.6	90	517	5.7	8
CFL career		160	103	62–40–1	2,192	3,089	71.0	26,176	8.5	122	69	100.4	642	3,329	5.2	56

==== Postseason ====
Year	Team	Games			Passing								Rushing			
Year	Team	GP	GS	Record	Cmp	Att	Pct	Yds	Y/A	TD	Int	Rtg	Att	Yds	Y/A	TD
2017	TOR	2	0	0–0	0	0	0	0	0	0	0	0	4	4	1.0	1
2018	BC	1	0	0–0	0	0	0	0	0	0	0	0	1	0	0	0
2019	SSK	1	1	0–1	27	41	65.9	366	8.9	0	1	83.9	3	23	7.7	0
2021	SSK	2	2	1–1	41	60	68.3	454	7.6	2	4	73.9	16	110	6.9	1
2023	MTL	**3**	**3**	**3–0**	**54**	**74**	73.0	**677**	**9.1**	**6**	**3**	111.2	11	118	**10.7**	0
2024	MTL	1	1	0–1	27	42	64.3	330	7.9	3	2	92.4	8	49	6.1	0
2026	EDM	2	2	2–0	41	52	**78.8**	473	**9.1**	3	1	**115.8**	**22**	**129**	5.9	**3**
Career		12	9	6–3	190	269	70.6	2,300	8.6	14	11	96.9	65	433	6.7	5

=== College ===
Season	Team	Games			Passing								Rushing			
Season	Team	GP	GS	Record	Cmp	Att	Pct	Yds	Y/A	TD	Int	Rtg	Att	Yds	Avg	TD
2010	Nevada	0	0	—	Redshirted (redshirt)											
2011	Nevada	10	8	5–3	150	218	68.8	1,707	7.8	6	6	89.7	128	694	5.4	11
2012	Nevada	12	12	6–6	246	367	67.0	2,786	7.6	20	9	97.5	190	1,121	5.9	12
2013	Nevada	10	10	3–7	243	358	67.9	2,668	7.5	13	3	98.3	141	621	4.4	8
2014	Nevada	13	13	7–6	239	405	59.0	2,498	6.2	18	11	80.5	177	1,046	5.9	13
Career		45	43	21–22	878	1,348	65.1	9,659	7.2	57	29	135.0	636	3,482	5.5	44
