= Max Zimmermann (gridiron football) =

German gridiron football player (born 1994)

Berlin Thunder (ELF)
- Position: Wide receiver

Personal information
- Born: February 14, 1994 (age 32); Berlin, Germany
- Listed height: 5 ft 11 in (1.80 m)
- Listed weight: 195 lb (88 kg)

Career information
- College: Potsdam
- CFL draft: 2019 Euro: 1st round, 6th overall pick

Career history
- Potsdam Royals (2017–2018); Saskatchewan Roughriders (2019–2020); Kuopio Steelers (2020); Berlin Thunder (2023)

Career CFL statistics
- Games played: 1
- Stats at CFL.ca

Max (Masse) Zimmermann (born February 14, 1994) is a German professional gridiron football wide receiver who is a wide receiver for the Berlin Thunder in the European League of Football (ELF). He was born in Germany and played in the German Football League (GFL) before being signed by the Saskatchewan Roughriders of the Canadian Football League (CFL).

== Early life and education ==
Zimmerman was born on February 14, 1994, in Berlin, Germany. He went to college at Potsdam.

== Professional career ==
Pre-draft measurables
Height	Weight	40-yard dash	20-yard shuttle	Three-cone drill	Vertical jump	Broad jump	Bench press
5 ft 11 1/2 in (1.82 m)	193 lb (88 kg)	4.73 s	4.40 s	7.06 s	32.0 in (0.81 m)	9 ft 9 in (2.97 m)	15 reps
All values from CFL Combine

=== Potsdam Royals ===
He started his career with the Potsdam Royals of the German Football League in 2017. He played there from 2017 to 2018. In 2017, he played on the Germany national American football team. In his two seasons with the Royals, he played in 21 games and had 60 receptions for 1,242 yards and 18 touchdowns. They won the 2018 EFL Bowl.

=== Saskatchewan Roughriders ===
In 2019, he was picked as 1 of 18 European players to attend the 2019 CFL Combine. Zimmermann was drafted in the 2019 CFL European Draft by the Saskatchewan Roughriders. He spent most of the season on the practice squad but he did make one appearance. He did not have any statistics in his one game. He was released on June 21, 2021.

=== Kuopio Steelers ===
When the 2020 CFL season was canceled, players were allowed to play in other leagues. Zimmermann went to the Kuopio Steelers in a Finland football league. The Steelers would later win the league championship.
