= Jacob Dearborn =

Canadian football player and bobsledder (born 1994)

No. 28
- Position: Defensive back

Personal information
- Born: June 15, 1994 (age 32); Yarker, Ontario, Canada
- Listed height: 6 ft 3 in (1.91 m)
- Listed weight: 194 lb (88 kg)

Career information
- AFL: Holland Hurricanes
- University: Carleton Ravens
- CFL draft: 2019: undrafted

Career history
- 2019–2021: Saskatchewan Roughriders
- 2023: Hamilton Tiger-Cats

Awards and highlights
- 3× Moosehead Cup champion (2013, 2014, 2015)
- Stats at CFL.ca

Jacob Dearborn (born June 15, 1994) is a Canadian former professional football defensive back. He is also an Olympic bobsledder and represented Canada at the 2022 Winter Olympics.

== Amateur career ==
Following high school graduation, Dearborn attended Holland College for the school's electrician program. While studying there, he played at defensive back, punter, and placekicker for the Holland Hurricanes in the Atlantic Football League (AFL) from 2013 to 2015 where he was a member of three straight Moosehead Cup championships. He was named an AFL All-Star in 2015 and graduated from the Industrial Electrical Technology program that year.

In 2016, Dearborn enrolled at Carleton University, where he played for the Ravens of U Sports football for three years. With the Ravens, he played in 23 games where he recorded 50.5 defensive tackles, seven interceptions, eight pass breakups, and one fumble recovery.

== Professional career ==
=== Pre-draft ===
Pre-draft measurables
| Height | Weight | 40-yard dash | 20-yard shuttle | Three-cone drill | Vertical jump | Broad jump | Bench press |
|---|---|---|---|---|---|---|---|
| 6 ft 3 1/8 in (1.91 m) | 194 lb (88 kg) | 4.69 s | 4.34 s | 7.09 s | 42.0 in (1.07 m) | 11 ft 1 3/4 in (3.40 m) | 12 reps |
All values from CFL Combine

Dearborn first participated in a CFL Regional Combine in Montreal in 2016, where he would have had the opportunity to sign with a Canadian Football League team as a free agent. After going unsigned, he played in U Sports for three years. He was draft-eligible in 2019 and again participated in the CFL's Montreal Regional Combine, where he set an all-time combine record with a broad jump of 11'1" and set an Eastern Regional Combine record for defensive backs with a vertical jump of 41 inches. He was then invited to the 2019 National Combine, where he led all participants with a 42-inch vertical jump. However, Dearborn was not selected in the 2019 CFL draft.

=== Saskatchewan Roughriders ===
As an undrafted free agent, Dearborn signed with the Saskatchewan Roughriders on May 10, 2019. He played in the team's first preseason game against the Calgary Stampeders, but suffered a calf injury which led to his eventual release on June 8, 2019. Upon his recovery, he was re-signed by the Roughriders on July 14, 2019, to a practice roster agreement. Soon after, he played in his first professional football game on July 20, 2019, against the BC Lions. In his rookie season, Dearborn played mostly on special teams where he recorded four special teams tackles in 14 regular season games played. He also played in the team's lone post-season game, which was a West Final loss to the Winnipeg Blue Bombers.

Dearborn did not play in 2020 due to the cancellation of the 2020 CFL season. He made the team's active roster following 2021 training camp and recorded his first career defensive tackle in the opening game on August 6, 2021, against the BC Lions. After the second game of the season, he was placed on the disabled list with a non-football injury and sat out the next five games. He returned to the active roster in week nine but was then moved to the practice roster in the following week. After being promoted to the active roster for the next game against the Calgary Stampeders, Dearborn had a career-high six defensive tackles and recorded his first career interception as the Roughriders won 20–17. He finished the season having played in eight regular season games with 18 defensive tackles, two special teams tackles, and two interceptions. He played in the Roughriders' West Semi-Final win against the Stampeders but was on the injured list for the team's West Final loss to the Blue Bombers. He became a free agent upon the expiry of his contract on February 8, 2022.

=== Hamilton Tiger-Cats ===
On October 24, 2023, it was announced that Dearborn had signed a practice roster agreement with the Hamilton Tiger-Cats. He was promoted to the active roster on October 27, 2023. He became a free agent after the season.

== Bobsledding ==
With his football career undecided in 2019, Dearborn was first introduced to the sport of bobsleigh. With the 2020 CFL season cancelled, he was able to focus on training for bobsleigh in an effort to make the national team. On January 20, 2022, Dearborn was named to Canada's 2022 Olympic team. The team finished in 23rd place.

== Personal life ==
Dearborn was born in Yarker, Ontario to parents Ken Dearborn and Liz Shibley. He has one older brother, CFL Free Agent Chris Shibley and three older sisters; Lauren Dearborn, Elizabeth Dearborn and Julie O’Neil.
