= Paul McRoberts =

American football player (born 1992)

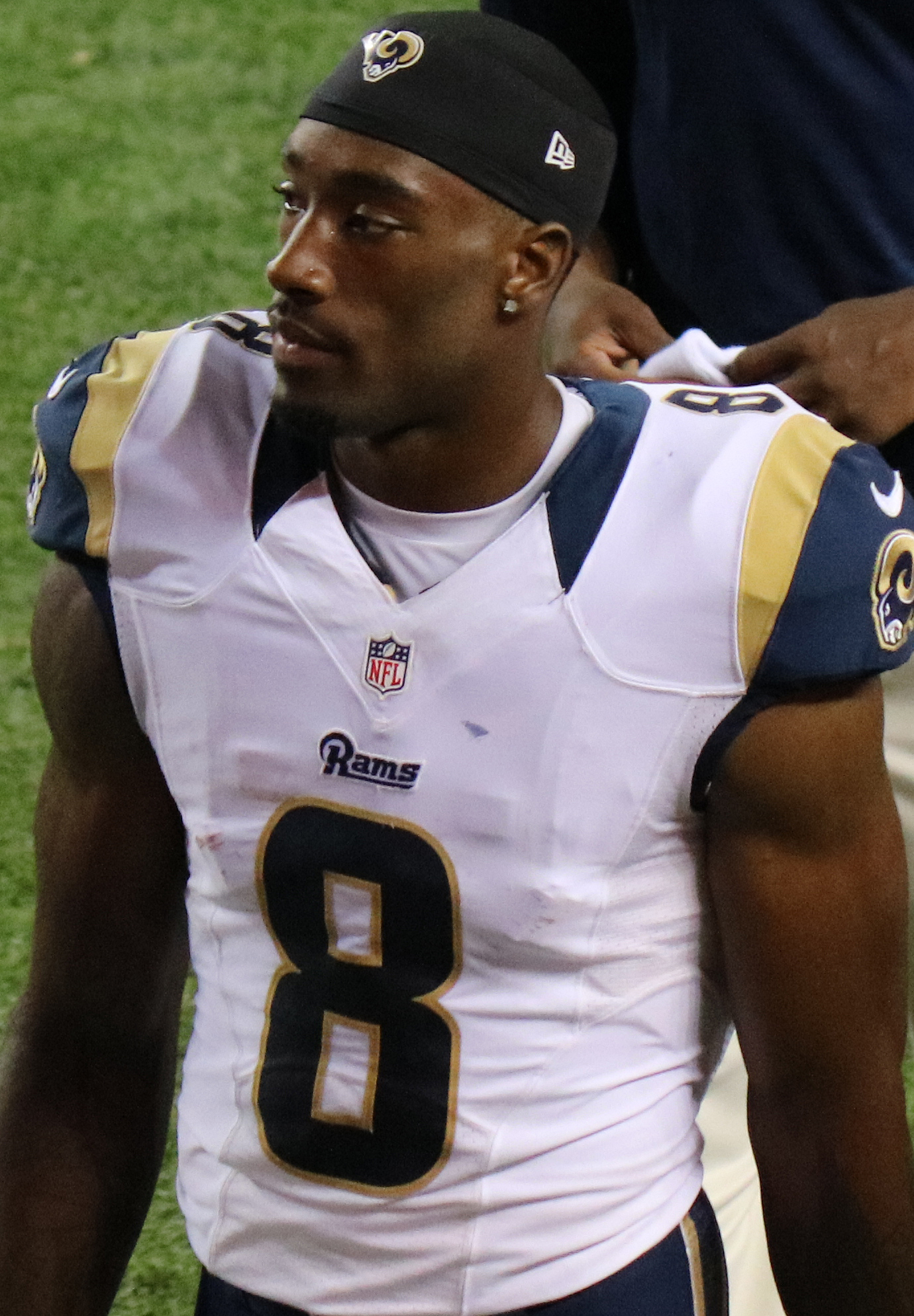
- McRoberts with the Los Angeles Rams in 2016

No. 8, 88
- Position: Wide receiver

Personal information
- Born: November 15, 1992 (age 33); St. Louis, Missouri, U.S.
- Listed height: 6 ft 3 in (1.91 m)
- Listed weight: 192 lb (87 kg)

Career information
- High school: Soldan (St. Louis)
- College: Southeast Missouri State (2012–2015)
- NFL draft: 2016: undrafted

Career history
- Los Angeles Rams (2016–2017); Saskatchewan Roughriders (2019–2021)
- Stats at Pro Football Reference

Paul McRoberts (born November 15, 1992) is an American former professional football player who was a wide receiver in the National Football League (NFL) and Canadian Football League (CFL). He played college football for the Southeast Missouri State Redhawks, and signed with the Los Angeles Rams as an undrafted free agent in 2016.

== College career ==
After attending Soldan International Studies High School in Missouri. McRoberts played college football at Southeast Missouri State University as a standout wide receiver.

== Professional career ==
=== Los Angeles Rams ===
After going undrafted in the 2016 NFL draft, McRoberts signed with the Los Angeles Rams on May 4, 2016 as an undrafted free agent. On September 3, 2016, he was waived by the Rams as part of final roster cuts and was signed to the practice squad the next day. He was promoted to the active roster on December 23, 2016.

On September 2, 2017, McRoberts was waived by the Rams and was signed to the practice squad the next day. He was released on December 26, 2017.

=== Saskatchewan Roughriders ===
McRoberts signed with the Saskatchewan Roughriders of the Canadian Football League on April 24, 2019. He was released on June 2, 2022.

== Personal life ==
During the 2016 NFL preseason of his rookie year, McRoberts's 18-year-old step-brother, Paul, was murdered.
