= Charbel Dabire =

Burkinabé gridiron football player (born 1997)

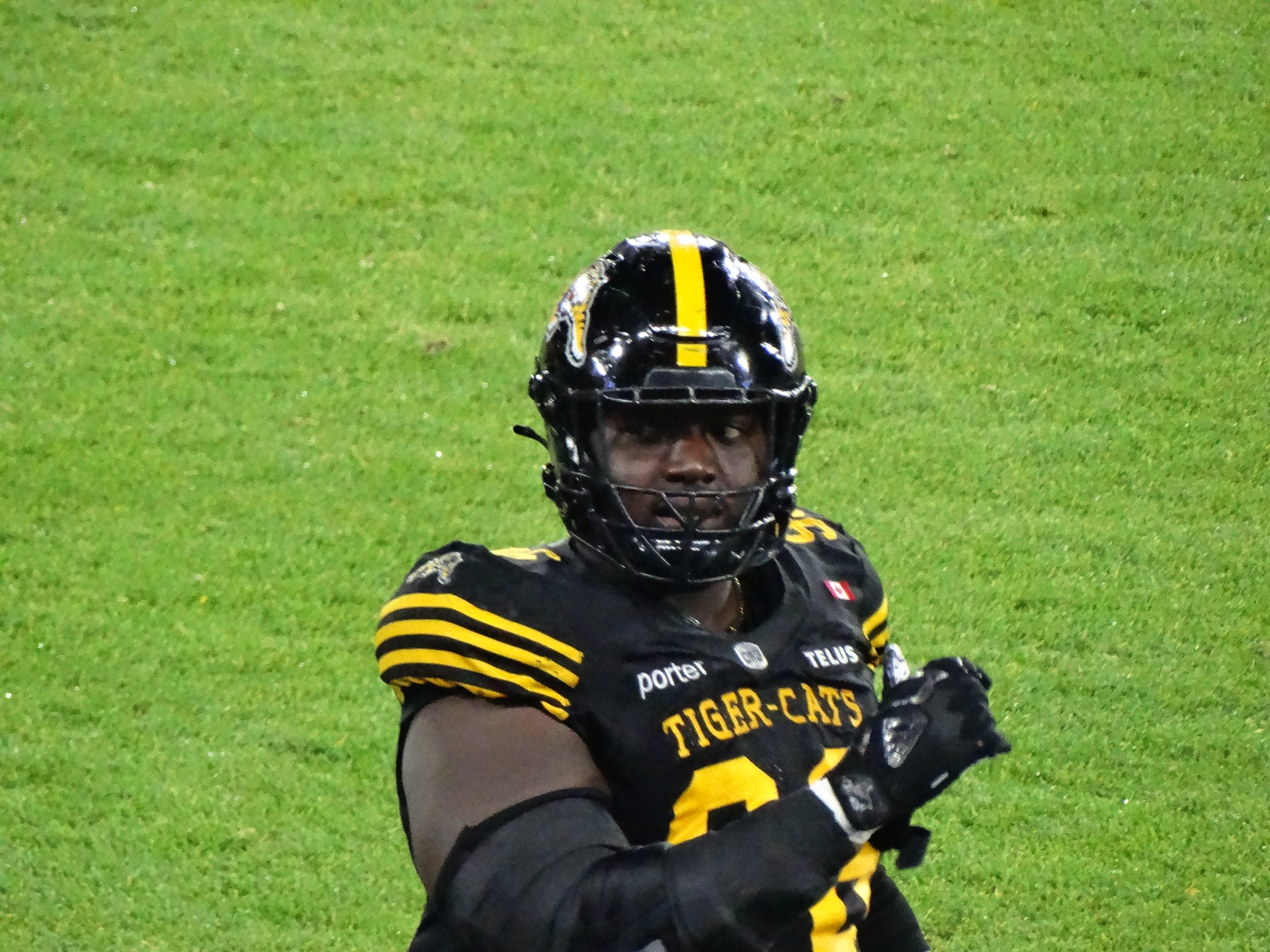
- Dabire with the Hamilton Tiger-Cats in 2026

No. 96 – Hamilton Tiger-Cats
- Position: Defensive lineman
- Roster status: Active
- CFL status: National

Personal information
- Born: January 15, 1997 (age 29); Burkina Faso
- Listed height: 6 ft 0 in (1.83 m)
- Listed weight: 300 lb (136 kg)

Career information
- High school: Mount Carmel (Toronto, Ontario, Canada); IMG Academy (Bradenton, Florida, U.S.)
- College: New Mexico Military Institute (2015); Wagner (2016–2018)
- CFL draft: 2019: 5th round, 44th overall pick

Career history
- Saskatchewan Roughriders (2019–2025); Hamilton Tiger-Cats (2026–present)

Awards and highlights
- Grey Cup champion (2025)

Career CFL statistics as of 2026
- Games played: 71
- Tackles: 60
- Sacks: 9
- Stats at CFL.ca

Charbel Dabire (born January 15, 1997) is a Burkinabé professional football defensive lineman for the Hamilton Tiger-Cats of the Canadian Football League (CFL). He played college football for Wagner and was drafted in the fifth round (44th overall) of the 2019 CFL draft.

== Early life ==
Charbel Dabire was born on January 15, 1997, in Burkina Faso. His family moved to Canada when he was young, and he attended Mount Carmel High School in Toronto. After a time at Mount Carmel, Dabire transferred to IMG Academy in Bradenton, Florida.

== College career ==
After graduating high school, Dabire spent 2015 with the New Mexico Military Institute junior college. He made 22 tackles during his freshman season.

Dabire transferred to Wagner University after one season in New Mexico. During his first year at Wagner, he played in 11 games and started six, making 25 total tackles and two sacks. As a junior, he played in all 11 games again, starting 3 of them. He finished the year with 22 tackles. He was named team captain prior to his senior year of 2018. As team captain, Dabire made a career-best 26 tackles, and recorded one 36-yard fumble return touchdown off a blocked punt.

== Professional career ==
=== Saskatchewan Roughriders ===
Following his senior year, Dabire was selected with the 44th pick of the 2019 CFL draft by the Saskatchewan Roughriders. He previously had a pro day with the New York Giants of the National Football League (NFL), but was not selected in their draft. He signed his rookie contract with the Roughriders in May 2019. In his first season, Dabire appeared in 11 games, started one, and made seven tackles and a sack. He was re-signed in 2020, after the season was cancelled due to COVID-19. He played his first 2021 game against the Hamilton Tiger-Cats in week two, making one tackle. Dabire finished the 2021 season with 11 games played, eight tackles and one sack. The following year, he played 16 games, six as a starter, and made 10 tackles as well as two sacks.

He became a free agent upon the expiry of his contract on February 10, 2026.

=== Hamilton Tiger-Cats ===
On February 11, 2026, it was announced that Dabire had signed with the Hamilton Tiger-Cats.
