= Kyran Moore =

American gridiron football player (born 1996)

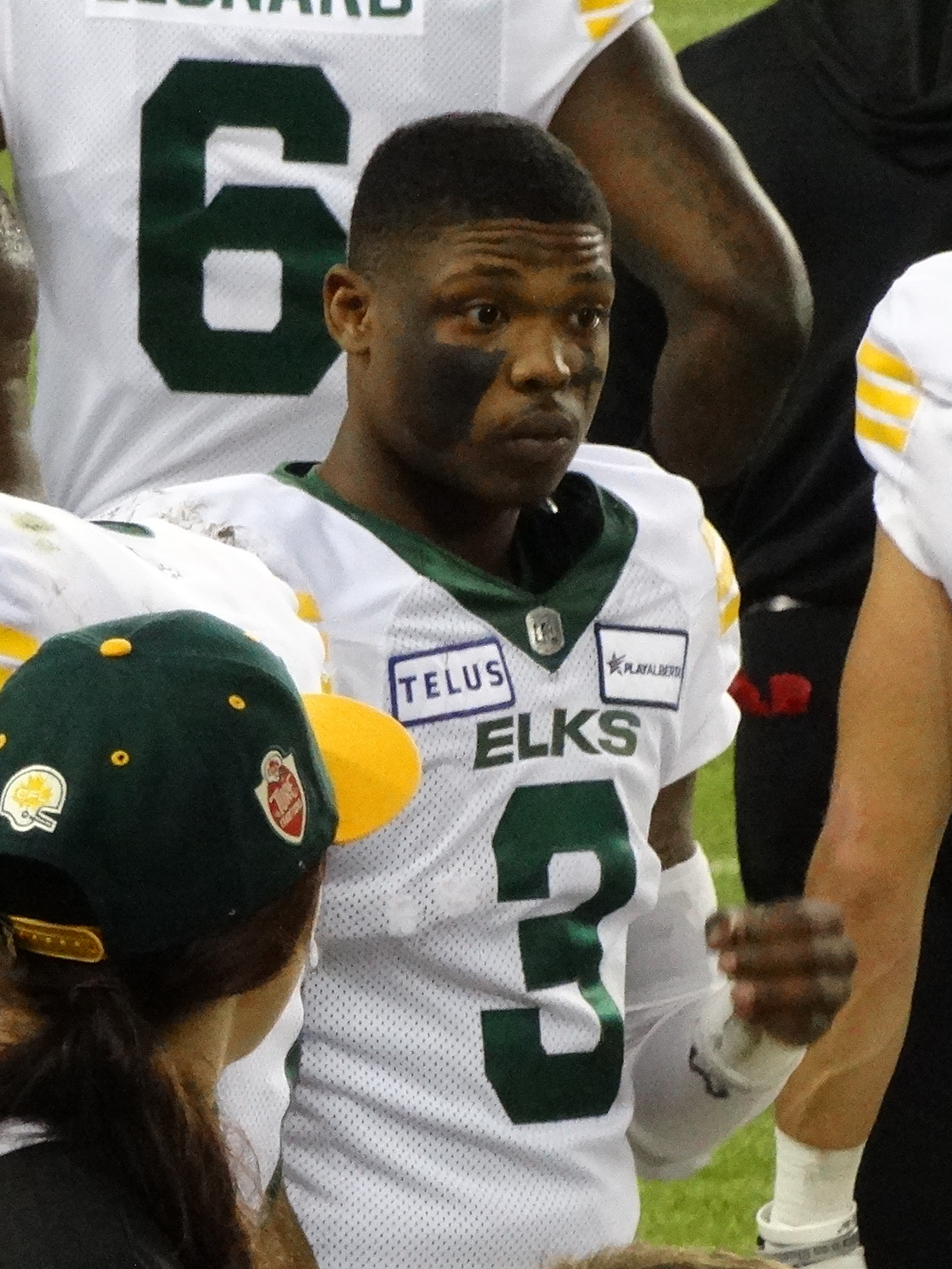
- Moore with the Edmonton Elks in 2023

Profile
- Position: Wide receiver

Personal information
- Born: September 19, 1996 (age 30); Bessemer, Alabama, U.S.
- Listed height: 5 ft 10 in (1.78 m)
- Listed weight: 165 lb (75 kg)

Career information
- High school: McAdory (McCalla, Alabama)
- College: Austin Peay
- NFL draft: 2018: undrafted

Career history
- Saskatchewan Roughriders (2018–2022); Edmonton Elks (2023–2024); Winnipeg Blue Bombers (2025)*
- * Offseason or practice squad member only

Career CFL statistics
- Games played: 64
- Receptions: 279
- Receiving yards: 3,094
- Receiving touchdowns: 14
- Stats at CFL.ca

Kyran Moore (born September 19, 1996) is an American professional football wide receiver. He played college football at Austin Peay.

== College career ==
Moore played college football for Austin Peay from 2014 to 2017.

== Professional career ==
=== Saskatchewan Roughriders ===
In May 2018, Moore signed with the Saskatchewan Roughriders. He was moved to the team's practice roster on June 10, 2018. He was promoted to the active roster on August 24, 2018, and played in his first CFL game the next day. He signed a one-year contract extension with the Roughriders on January 13, 2021.

=== Edmonton Elks ===
Moore joined the Edmonton Elks as a free agent on February 14, 2023. He played in all 18 regular season games in 2023 where he recorded 69 receptions for 490 yards and four touchdowns. Ahead of the 2024 season opener, Moore suffered a torn ACL injury in practice and missed the entire season. He became a free agent upon the expiry of his contract on February 11, 2025.

=== Winnipeg Blue Bombers ===
On August 25, 2025, Moore signed a practice roster agreement with the Winnipeg Blue Bombers. However, he was released the following week on September 3, 2025.
