= Jordan Williams-Lambert =

American gridiron football player (born 1994)

Fishers Freight
- Position: Wide receiver
- CFL status: American

Personal information
- Born: May 9, 1994 (age 32); Chicago, Illinois, U.S.
- Listed height: 6 ft 3 in (1.91 m)
- Listed weight: 228 lb (103 kg)

Career information
- High school: Indianapolis (IN) North Central
- College: Ball State
- NFL draft: 2016: undrafted

Career history
- New Orleans Saints (2016–2017)*; Saskatchewan Roughriders (2018); Chicago Bears (2019)*; Saskatchewan Roughriders (2019–2021); Calgary Stampeders (2022)*; Fishers Freight (2025–present)
- * Offseason or practice squad member only

Awards and highlights
- Jackie Parker Trophy (2018); 2× Second-team All-MAC (2014, 2015)

Career CFL statistics
- Games played: 24
- Receptions: 81
- Receiving yards: 973
- Receiving touchdowns: 4
- W/WillJo06.htm Stats at Pro Football Reference

Jordan Williams-Lambert (born May 9, 1994) is an American professional football wide receiver for the Fishers Freight of the Indoor Football League (IFL). He played college football at Ball State where he was chosen for an All-MAC pick and selection.

== College career ==
During his college season, Williams-Lambert was chosen as a third-team All-MAC pick for the Ball State Cardinals in 2013 where he averaged 200 receptions for 2,723 yards for a 13.6 average in the rest of his career. Before he entered the 2015 NFL draft, he was ranked fourth for most receptions and receiving yards for 24 touchdowns.

== Professional career ==
=== New Orleans Saints ===
Williams-Lambert signed with the New Orleans Saints as an undrafted free agent on May 2, 2016. He was waived by the Saints on September 3, 2016, and was signed to the practice squad the next day. After spending the entire season on the practice squad, Williams-Lambert signed a reserve/future contract with the Saints on January 2, 2017.

On August 9, 2017, Williams-Lambert was waived by the Saints and placed on injured reserve. He was released on August 11, 2017.

=== Saskatchewan Roughriders (first stint) ===
Williams-Lambert signed with the Saskatchewan Roughriders in time for the 2018 season. He played in 16 games for the Riders catching 62 passes for 764 yards with 4 touchdowns. On December 21, 2018, the Riders allowed Williams-Lambert to work out for NFL teams.

=== Chicago Bears ===
On January 18, 2019, Williams-Lambert signed a reserve/future contract with the Chicago Bears. He was waived on August 31, 2019.

=== Saskatchewan Roughriders (second stint) ===
On September 4, 2019, Williams-Lambert was added back to the roster of the Roughriders. As part of his Memorandum of Agreement with the Riders, the CFL and the CFLPA in the event he was released by the Bears his right would automatically transfer back to the Riders. On September 10, 2019, Williams-Lambert and the Riders officially agreed on a contract extension, keeping him with the club through the 2020 season. He signed a one-year contract extension with the team on January 20, 2021. However, he played in only four games where he had 14 catches for 152 yards. He became a free agent upon the expiry of his contract on February 8, 2022.

=== Calgary Stampeders ===
On February 16, 2022, it was announced that Williams-Lambert had signed with the Calgary Stampeders. On May 29, 2022, the Stampeders released him following the first pre-season game.

== Statistics ==
Receiving		Regular season						Playoffs
Year	Team	Games	Rec.	Yards	Avg	Long	TD	Games	Rec.	Yards	Avg	Long	TD
2018	SSK	16	62	764	12.3	39	4	1	1	1	1.0	1	0
CFL totals		16	62	764	12.3	39	4	1	1	1	1.0	1	0
