= L. J. McCray =

American football player (born 1991)

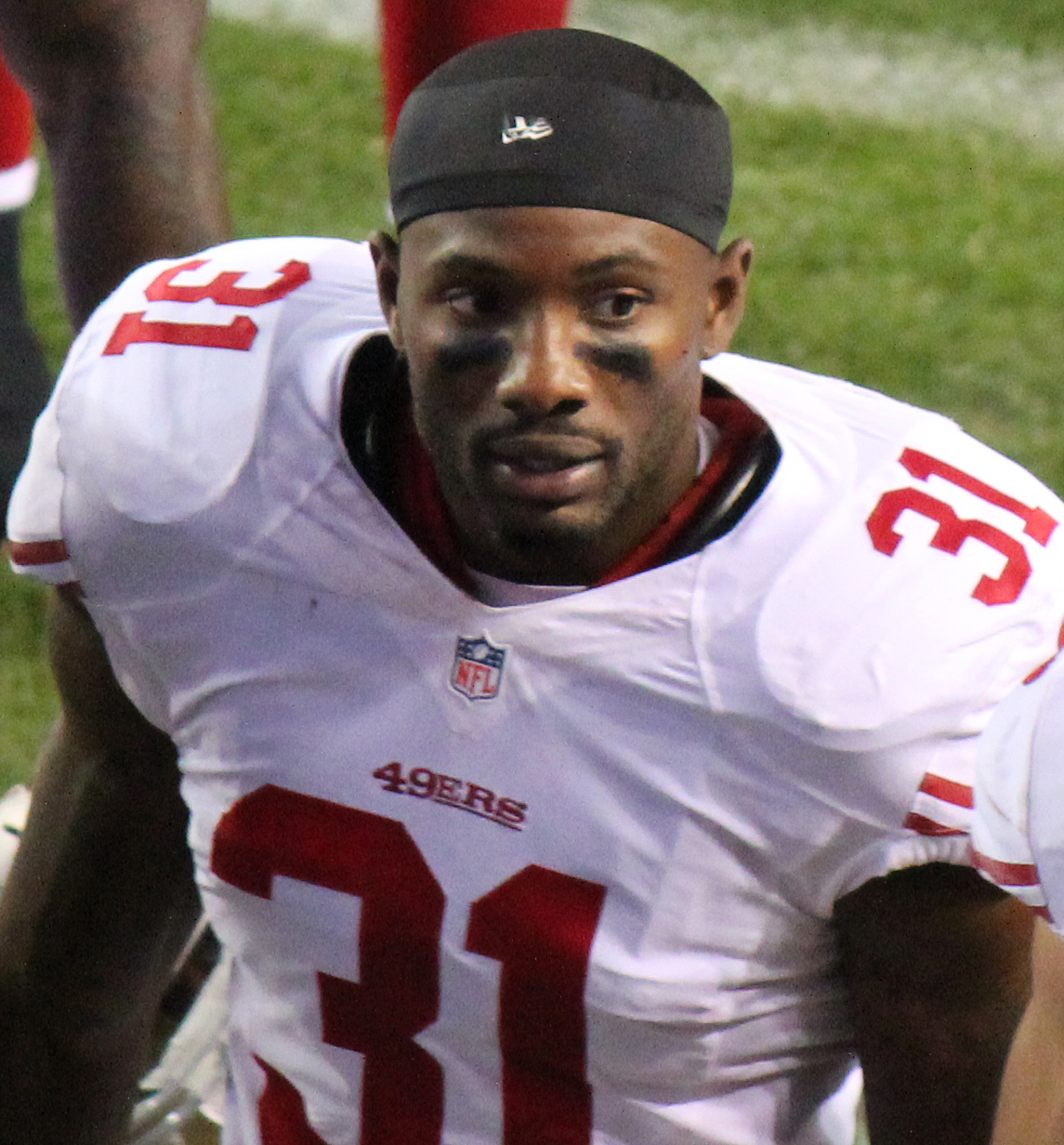
- McCray with the San Francisco 49ers in 2014

No. 31, 21
- Position: Safety

Personal information
- Born: June 18, 1991 (age 35); Georgetown, South Carolina, U.S.
- Listed height: 6 ft 0 in (1.83 m)
- Listed weight: 210 lb (95 kg)

Career information
- High school: Harding University (Charlotte, North Carolina)
- College: Catawba (2009–2013)
- NFL draft: 2014: undrafted

Career history
- San Francisco 49ers (2014–2015); Carolina Panthers (2017); Buffalo Bills (2017–2018)*; Saskatchewan Roughriders (2019–2021)
- * Offseason or practice squad member only

Career NFL statistics
- Total tackles: 14
- Stats at Pro Football Reference

James Oneil "L. J." McCray II (born June 18, 1991) is an American former professional football player who was a safety for the San Francisco 49ers of the National Football League (NFL). He played college football at Catawba College. He also played for the Saskatchewan Roughriders of the Canadian Football League (CFL).

== Early life ==
McCray attended Harding University High School in Charlotte, North Carolina.

== College career ==
McCray played for the Catawba Indians from 2009 to 2013. He was redshirted in 2011 after sustaining an injury. He was a first-team All-South Atlantic Conference selection in 2012. He recorded 78 tackles, 2 sacks and 8 pass break ups his senior year in 2013.

== Professional career ==
Pre-draft measurables
Height	Weight	40-yard dash	10-yard split	20-yard split	20-yard shuttle	Three-cone drill	Vertical jump	Broad jump	Bench press
6 ft 0 in (1.83 m)	210 lb (95 kg)	4.52 s	1.53 s	2.57 s	4.07 s	6.77 s	36 in (0.91 m)	10 ft 4 in (3.15 m)	24 reps
All values from Arizona Pro Day

=== San Francisco 49ers ===
McCray was signed by the San Francisco 49ers on May 10, 2014, after going undrafted in the 2014 NFL draft. He made his NFL debut on September 7, 2014, against the Dallas Cowboys.

On September 3, 2016, McCray was traded to the Seattle Seahawks for an undisclosed draft pick, but failed his physical examination with them, voiding the trade. He was then waived by 49ers on September 5, 2016.

=== Carolina Panthers ===
On January 5, 2017, McCray signed a reserve/future contract with the Carolina Panthers. He was placed on injured reserve on September 2, 2017. On September 11, 2017, he was waived with an injury settlement.

=== Buffalo Bills ===
On October 17, 2017, McCray was signed to the Buffalo Bills' practice squad. He was released on January 2, 2018. He signed a reserve/future contract with the Bills on January 10, 2018.

On August 28, 2018, McCray was released by the Bills.

=== Saskatchewan Roughriders ===
McCray started 13 games for the Saskatchewan Roughriders of the Canadian Football League in 2019. The 2020 CFL season was cancelled due to the COVID-19 pandemic. McCray signed a one-year contract extension with the Roughriders on January 18, 2021. He was placed on the suspended list on July 3, 2021.
