= Makana Henry =

Canadian defensive lineman

No. 74
- Position: Defensive lineman

Personal information
- Born: January 23, 1987 (age 39); Toronto, Ontario, Canada
- Listed height: 6 ft 1 in (1.85 m)
- Listed weight: 275 lb (125 kg)

Career information
- CJFL: Burlington Braves

Career history
- 2016–2021: Saskatchewan Roughriders
- 2022: Edmonton Elks

Awards and highlights
- 2x C.J.F.L. All-Canadian Defensive Team (2005-2006); Riders Community Service Award (2017- 2019); Nominee for CFL Tom Pate Award (2017- 2018); Nominee for CFL Jake Gaudaur Veterans’ Award (2018)
- Stats at CFL.ca

Makana Henry (born January 23, 1987) is a Canadian former professional football defensive lineman. He was signed to the Saskatchewan Roughriders' roster in August 2016. He played junior football for the Burlington Braves of the Canadian Junior Football League (C.J.F.L.) in 2005–2009. Before being invited by the Roughriders, he played in semi-pro football for the GTA All Stars of the Northern Football Conference league in 2016. In November 2019, he was re-signed for an additional 2-year contract. Henry signed with the Edmonton Elks to open free agency on February 8, 2022.

== Charitable activities ==
Henry is very involved in the Saskatchewan community, especially with the students of Scott Collegiate. In 2017, he was named Mosaic Community Player of the year and made a donation to Scott Collegiate. For three consecutive years (2017–2019), Henry won the Roughriders’ Community Service Award.
