= Elie Bouka =

Canadian gridiron football player (born 1992)

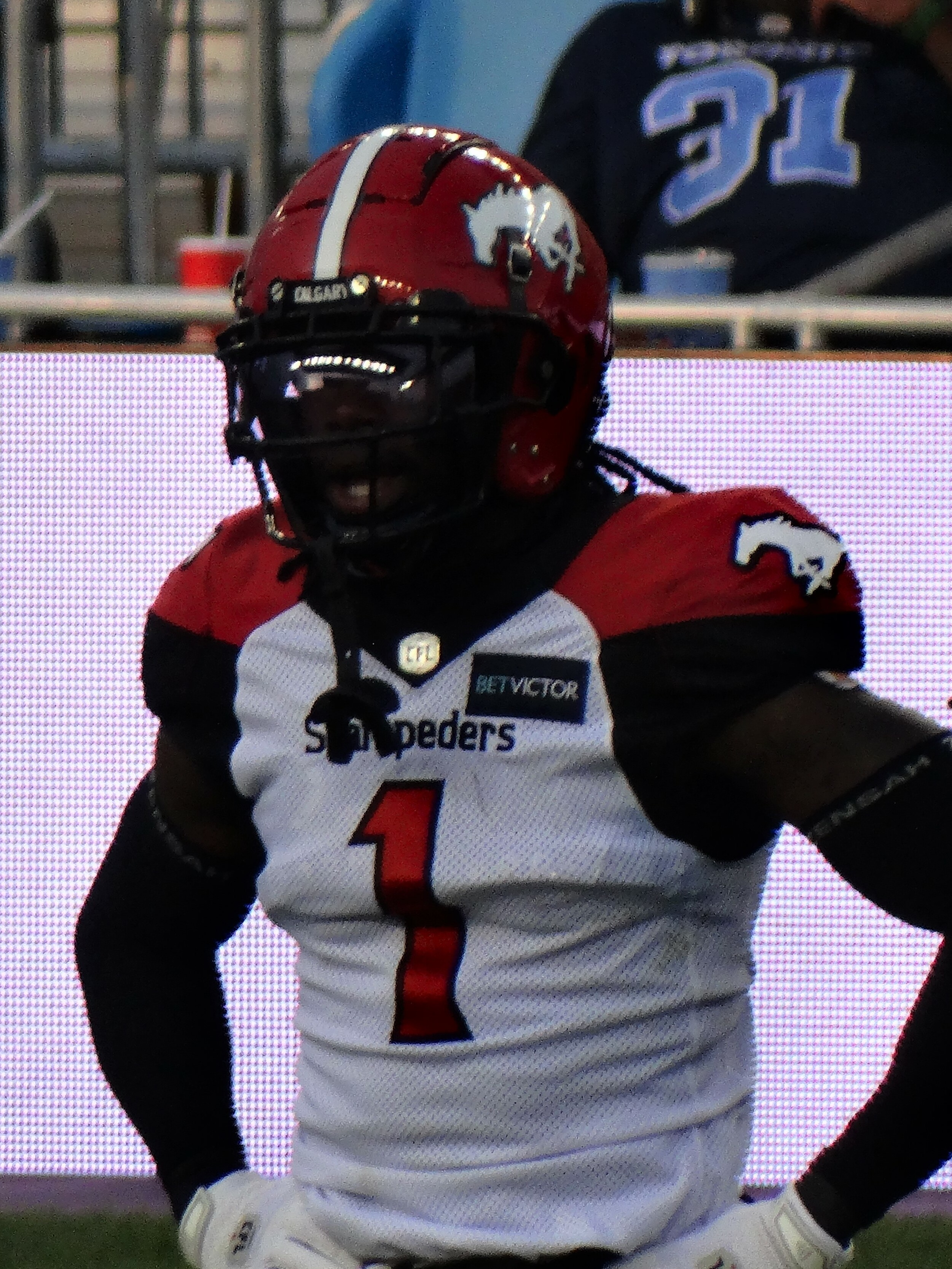
- Bouka with the Calgary Stampeders in 2022

Calgary Colts
- Title: Head coach
- CFL status: National

Personal information
- Born: August 15, 1992 (age 34); Laval, Quebec, Canada
- Listed height: 6 ft 1 in (1.85 m)
- Listed weight: 205 lb (93 kg)

Career information
- Position: Defensive back
- University: Calgary
- NFL draft: 2016: undrafted
- CFL draft: 2016: 3rd round, 24th overall pick

Career history

Playing
- Arizona Cardinals (2016); Saskatchewan Roughriders (2017); Philadelphia Eagles (2018); Saskatchewan Roughriders (2019–2021); Calgary Stampeders (2022)

Coaching
- Calgary Dinos (2024–2025) Strength & conditioning coach; Calgary Colts (2026–present) Head coach
- Stats at Pro Football Reference
- Stats at CFL.ca

Elie Christopher Bouka (born August 15, 1992) is a Canadian football coach who is the head coach for the Calgary Colts of the Canadian Junior Football League (CJFL). He played professionally as a defensive back and has been a member of the Arizona Cardinals, Saskatchewan Roughriders, Philadelphia Eagles, and Calgary Stampeders. He also played CIS football for the Calgary Dinos.

== Professional career ==
=== Arizona Cardinals ===
Bouka was signed by the Arizona Cardinals as an undrafted free agent on May 2, 2016. He was placed on injured reserve on August 30, 2016, after suffering a hamstring injury in the preseason.

On August 1, 2017, Bouka was waived by the Cardinals with an injury settlement after suffering an ankle injury.

=== Saskatchewan Roughriders (first stint) ===
Bouka was drafted by the Saskatchewan Roughriders of the Canadian Football League (CFL) in the third round of the 2016 CFL draft. After his release from the Cardinals, he signed with the Roughriders on September 20, 2017. He played in four games for the Roughriders in 2017.

=== Philadelphia Eagles ===
On January 3, 2018, Bouka signed a reserve/future contract with the Philadelphia Eagles. He was waived/injured by the Eagles on April 30, 2018, and was placed on injured reserve.

On February 21, 2019, Bouka was waived by the Eagles.

=== Saskatchewan Roughriders (second stint) ===
Bouka signed with the Roughriders on April 30, 2019. He was placed on the Roughriders' suspended list on July 3, 2021.

=== Calgary Stampeders ===
Bouka was signed by the Calgary Stampeders of the CFL on February 10, 2022. He played in 14 regular season games in 2022 where he had a career-high 17 defensive tackles, seven special teams tackles, and one interception.

== Coaching career ==
=== Calgary Dinos ===
Bouka served as the strength and conditioning coach for the Calgary Dinos from 2024 to 2025.

=== Calgary Colts ===
On February 3, 2026, it was announced that Bouka had been named head coach for the Calgary Colts of the Canadian Junior Football League.
