= Jordan Reaves =

Canadian gridiron football player (born 1990)

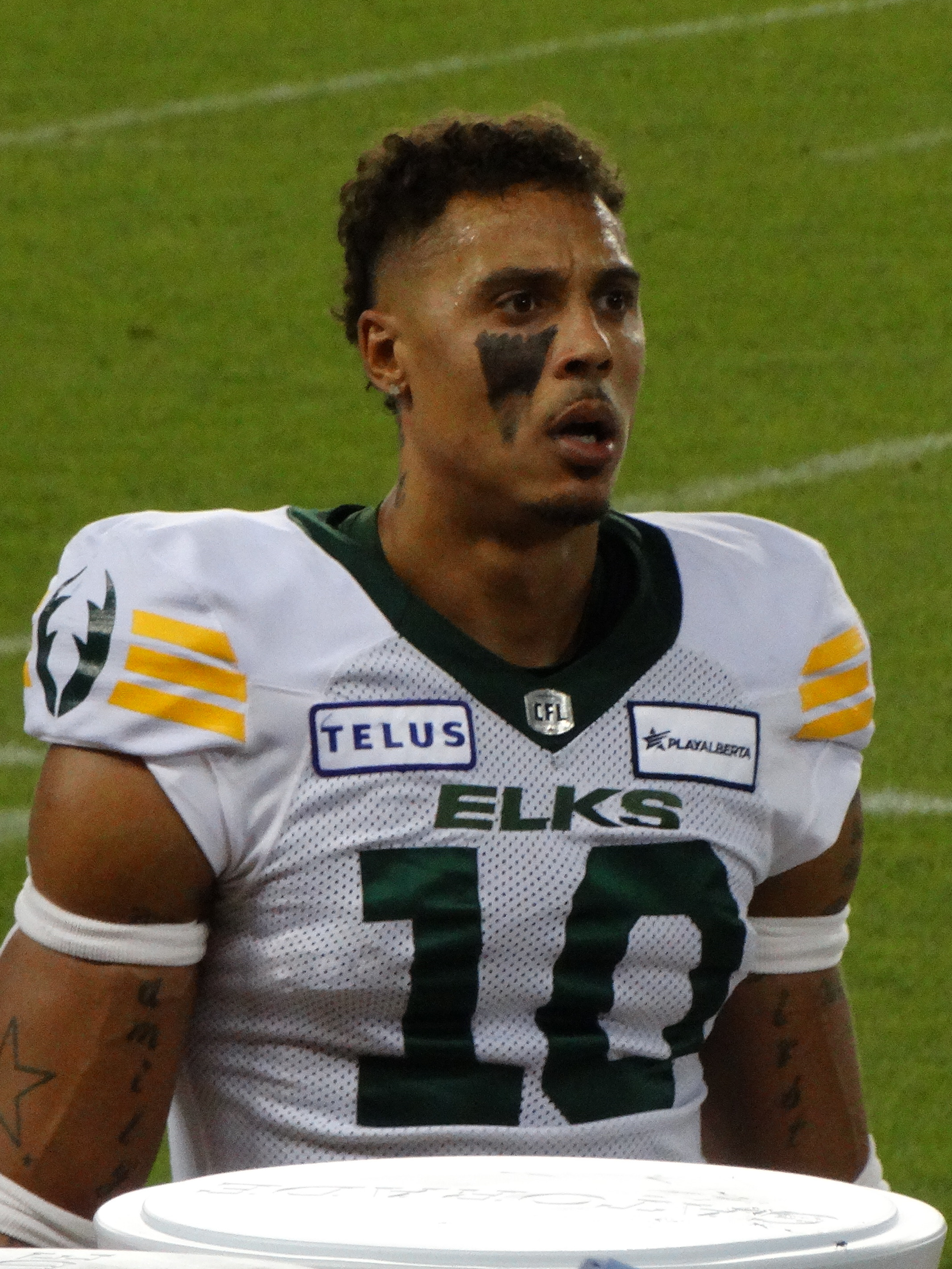
- Reaves with the Edmonton Elks in 2023

Profile
- Position: Defensive lineman

Personal information
- Born: January 25, 1990 (age 36); Winnipeg, Manitoba, Canada
- Listed height: 6 ft 4 in (1.93 m)
- Listed weight: 230 lb (104 kg)

Career information
- University: Brandon

Career history
- 2015: Winnipeg Blue Bombers*
- 2016–2021: Saskatchewan Roughriders
- 2022–2023: Edmonton Elks
- * Offseason or practice squad member only
- Stats at CFL.ca

Jordan Reaves (born January 25, 1990) is a Canadian professional football defensive lineman. He played in the Canadian Football League (CFL) for the Saskatchewan Roughriders and Edmonton Elks. Reaves originally played basketball for the Brandon Bobcats of Canadian Interuniversity Sport before making the switch to football.

== University career ==
Reaves played from 2010 to 2014 for the Brandon University Bobcats men's basketball team.

== Professional career ==
=== Winnipeg Blue Bombers ===
Reaves was signed by his hometown Winnipeg Blue Bombers on April 9, 2015, following workouts in Winnipeg and at the 2015 Edmonton Regional Combine. He played in two pre-season games as a wide receiver and recorded one catch for six yards. Reaves was part of the team's final cuts on June 20, 2016.

=== Saskatchewan Roughriders ===
After spending the 2015 CFL season unsigned by a CFL team, Reaves signed with the Saskatchewan Roughriders on January 29, 2016. While listed as a defensive back, Reaves practiced as a defensive lineman through training camp and upon making the team, he dressed in his first regular season game on June 30, 2016, as a backup defensive end. He played in five games for the Roughriders in 2016 and recorded two special teams tackles. He was released during training camp the following year on June 18, 2017. On May 20, 2018, he re-signed with Saskatchewan for 2018 training camp. Reaves signed a one-year contract extension with the Roughriders on December 21, 2020.

=== Edmonton Elks ===
Reaves joined the Edmonton Elks in free agency on February 15, 2022. He played in eight regular season games in 2022 where he had two special teams tackles. The Elks announced Reaves was re-signed on July 3, 2023. In 2023, he played in 11 regular season games and recorded seven special teams tackles. He became a free agent upon the expiry of his contract on February 13, 2024.

== Personal life ==
Jordan is the youngest son of former Winnipeg Blue Bomber running back Willard Reaves, who played with the team for five years and was a member of the 72nd Grey Cup winning team. Jordan is also the younger brother of Ryan Reaves, a professional hockey player and right wing for the San Jose Sharks of the National Hockey League.

In 2008, Reaves was convicted of possession for the purpose of trafficking and breaching the conditions of his bail. He received a conditional sentence, one year of supervised probation, and a 10-year weapons ban. In 2016, Reaves was charged with one count of drug trafficking, he pleaded not guilty and was acquitted in 2018.

Reaves is the great-great-great-grandson of Bass Reeves, a former slave who was the first black lawman west of the Mississippi River and among the first black U.S. deputy marshalls; Reeves' life is the focus of the 2023 TV series Lawmen: Bass Reeves. Bass served as a deputy U.S. marshal in Fort Smith, Arkansas, under the direction of judge Isaac C. Parker, known as the "Hanging Judge".
