= Blace Brown =

American gridiron football player (born 1996)

Profile
- Position: Cornerback

Personal information
- Born: May 29, 1996 (age 30); Conyers, Georgia, U.S.
- Listed height: 6 ft 0 in (1.83 m)
- Listed weight: 195 lb (88 kg)

Career information
- High school: Cherokee (Canton, Georgia)
- College: Troy
- NFL draft: 2019: undrafted

Career history
- Saskatchewan Roughriders (2019–2022)

Awards and highlights
- First-team All-Sun Belt (2017)

Career CFL statistics
- Total tackles: 39
- Interceptions: 2
- Forced fumbles: 1
- Stats at CFL.ca

Blace Gaston Alexander Brown (born May 29, 1996) is an American former professional football cornerback. He played college football at Troy. After going unselected in the 2019 NFL draft, Brown signed with the Saskatchewan Roughriders of the Canadian Football League (CFL). He is the nephew of Heisman Trophy winner Herschel Walker.

== Early life and education ==
Blace Brown was born on May 29, 1996, in Conyers, Georgia. He went to high school at Cherokee High School. Brown went to college at Troy. He was redshirted in 2015. He had 6 interceptions in 2016. In 2017, he was named to the First Team All-Sun belt with 5 interceptions. Brown tore his ACL in their conference championship game at Arkansas State later that year. He played in all 12 games and had 44 tackles in his senior year. He finished the year with second-team all-Sun Belt honors.

== Professional career ==
Pre-draft measurables
Height	Weight	Arm length	Hand span	40-yard dash	10-yard split	20-yard split	20-yard shuttle	Three-cone drill	Vertical jump	Broad jump	Bench press
6 ft 0 3/8 in (1.84 m)	194 lb (88 kg)	32 in (0.81 m)	9 3/4 in (0.25 m)	4.67 s	1.62 s	2.75 s	4.22 s	6.97 s	37.5 in (0.95 m)	10 ft 6 in (3.20 m)	14 reps
All values from NFL Combine/Pro Day

After going unselected in the 2019 NFL draft, Brown was invited to the San Francisco 49ers rookie minicamp for tryouts, but he was not signed to a contract.

He later signed with the Saskatchewan Roughriders of the Canadian Football League. He played in 2 games with them in his rookie season. He started one game, and had one tackle. In his second year in the league, Brown played in nine games and contributed with 21 defensive tackles, one special teams tackle, one interception and one forced fumble. On June 5, 2022, he was released by the Riders as part of the team's training camp cutdowns. Brown re-signed with the Riders on July 12, partway through the 2022 season. On February 14, 2023, Brown became a free agent.
