= 2018 Saskatchewan Roughriders season =

CFL team season

- General manager: Chris Jones
- Head coach: Chris Jones
- Home stadium: Mosaic Stadium

Results
- Record: 12–6
- Division place: 2nd, West
- Playoffs: Lost West Semi-Final
- Team MOP: Willie Jefferson
- Team MOC: Brett Lauther
- Team MOR: Jordan Williams-Lambert

Uniform

The 2018 Saskatchewan Roughriders season was the 61st season for the team in the Canadian Football League (CFL). It was the club's 109th year overall, and its 103rd season of play. The Roughriders improved upon their 10–8 record from 2017 with a 12–6 record and qualified for the playoffs for the second consecutive year. The team hosted the first ever playoff game at the new Mosaic Stadium, but lost to the Winnipeg Blue Bombers in the West Semi-Final. This was the third season under head coach and general manager Chris Jones.

The club held their training camp at Griffiths Stadium in Saskatoon, for the sixth consecutive season, with the main camp beginning on May 20.

The Roughriders became the first team to defeat the Calgary Stampeders in the 2018 regular season with a 40–27 win on August 19. At the time, they were also the only team to have lost to the Montreal Alouettes in the regular season, thus becoming the first team to be both the only team to beat a previously undefeated opponent and the only one to lose to a different opponent with a previously winless record after playing eight games of a professional football season.

== Offseason ==
On December 8, 2017, the Roughriders released Beau Landry, Zach Minter, Ivan Brown and Cameron Ontko. On December 20, 2017, it was announced the Roughriders re-signed Canadian quarterback Brandon Bridge, who split starting duties with Kevin Glenn during the 2017 season. The next day, the Roughriders would re-sign veteran defensive back Jovon Johnson and offensive lineman Thaddeus Coleman. On December 27, 2017, the Roughriders re-signed kick returner and the team's top rookie Christion Jones. Two days later, they would re-sign defensive back Crezdon Butler.

On January 3, 2018, the Roughriders acquired quarterback Zach Collaros from the Hamilton Tiger Cats. The next day, the Roughriders released veteran quarterback Kevin Glenn. On January 19, 2018, the Roughriders signed Collaros to a restructured contract for 2018. On January 22, 2018, the Roughriders re-signed star receiver Duron Carter to a one-year contract extension. On January 31, 2018, the Roughriders released linebacker Jeff Knox to pursue an opportunity in the National Football League. On February 1, 2018, the Roughriders released running backs Kienan LaFrance and Shakir Bell. The next day, the Roughriders acquired defensive lineman Charleston Hughes from the Hamilton Tiger Cats in exchange for quarterback Vernon Adams. On February 3, the Roughriders released Kacy Rodgers II so he could pursue an NFL opportunity with the New York Jets. The team also released international defensive back Erick Dargan.

On February 13, 2018, the first day of CFL free agency, the Roughriders re-signed national offensive lineman Dan Clark and fullback Spencer Moore. The team signed national defensive lineman Zack Evans. They also released international linebacker Glenn Love and offensive lineman Derek Dennis, who was their top free agent signing from 2017. The next day, the Roughriders officially announced the signing of national running back Jerome Messam and national linebacker Sam Hurl, both of whom had played for the team previously.

On February 15, 2018, the Roughriders signed international offensive lineman Travis Bond and national defensive back Adam Laurensse, but released their top defensive player from 2017 in national linebacker Henoc Muamba. On February 19, the Roughriders announced the signing of national receiver Jake Harty. The next day, the team announced international defensive end Charleston Hughes had signed an extension through 2019.

On February 22, 2018, the Roughriders re-signed international offensive lineman Jarvis Harrison, receiver TJ Thorpe, offensive lineman Terran Vaughn and defensive back Melvin White. They also signed international receivers Shaq Evans and Jacoby Ford.

=== CFL draft ===
The 2018 CFL draft took place on May 3, 2018. The Roughriders had five selections in the eight-round draft.

Round	Pick	Player	Position	School/Club team
1	5	Dakoda Shepley	OL	British Columbia
2	14	Micah Teitz	LB	Calgary
5	36	Mathieu Breton	DL	Bishop's
6	45	Tresor Buama-Mafuta	DL	Saint Mary's
8	63	Christopher Smith	OL	York

== Preseason ==
Week	Date	Kickoff	Opponent	Results		TV	Venue	Attendance	Summary
Week	Date	Kickoff	Opponent	Score	Record	TV	Venue	Attendance	Summary
1	Sun, May 27	3:00 p.m. CST	at Edmonton Eskimos	L 12–35	0–1	TSN	Commonwealth Stadium	28,374	Recap
2	Bye								
3	Fri, June 8	7:30 p.m. CST	vs. Calgary Stampeders	L 12–39	0–2	None	Mosaic Stadium	29,006	Recap

# Games played with primary home uniforms.

== Regular season ==
=== Standings ===
West Division
Team	GP	W	L	T	Pts	PF	PA	Div	Stk	
Calgary Stampeders	18	13	5	0	26	522	363	5–5	W1	Details
Saskatchewan Roughriders	18	12	6	0	24	450	444	7–3	W2	Details
Winnipeg Blue Bombers	18	10	8	0	20	550	419	4–6	L1	Details
BC Lions	18	9	9	0	18	423	473	4–6	L2	Details
Edmonton Eskimos	18	9	9	0	18	482	471	5–5	W1	Details

=== Schedule ===
As the province of Saskatchewan does not observe Daylight Saving Time, all times quoted here (in CST) are the same as Mountain Daylight Time.

Week	Game	Date	Kickoff	Opponent	Results		TV	Venue	Attendance	Summary
Week	Game	Date	Kickoff	Opponent	Score	Record	TV	Venue	Attendance	Summary
1	1	Fri, June 15	7:00 p.m. CST	vs. Toronto Argonauts	W 27–19	1–0	TSN/RDS2/ESPN2	Mosaic Stadium	29,788	Recap
2	2	Thurs, June 21	5:30 p.m. CST	at Ottawa Redblacks	L 17–40	1–1	TSN/RDS	TD Place Stadium	24,224	Recap
3	3	Sat, June 30	7:00 p.m. CST	vs. Montreal Alouettes	L 17–23	1–2	TSN/RDS	Mosaic Stadium	33,350	Recap
4	4	Thurs, July 5	7:00 p.m. CST	vs. Hamilton Tiger-Cats	W 18–13	2–2	TSN	Mosaic Stadium	30,594	Recap
5	Bye									
6	5	Thurs, July 19	5:30 p.m. CST	at Hamilton Tiger-Cats	W 31–20	3–2	TSN/RDS	Tim Hortons Field	23,346	Recap
7	6	Sat, July 28	7:00 p.m. CST	vs. Calgary Stampeders	L 22–34	3–3	TSN/ESPN2	Mosaic Stadium	33,350	Recap
8	7	Thurs, Aug 2	8:00 p.m. CST	at Edmonton Eskimos	L 19–26	3–4	TSN	Commonwealth Stadium	35,623	Recap
9	Bye									
10	8	Sun, Aug 19	5:00 p.m. CST	vs. Calgary Stampeders	W 40–27	4–4	TSN	Mosaic Stadium	33,350	Recap
11	9	Sat, Aug 25	8:00 p.m. CST	at BC Lions	W 24–21	5–4	TSN	BC Place	22,873	Recap
12	ǁ 10 ǁ	Sun, Sep 2	1:00 p.m. CST	vs. Winnipeg Blue Bombers	W 31–23	6–4	TSN	Mosaic Stadium	33,350	Recap
13	11	Sat, Sept 8	2:00 p.m. CST	at Winnipeg Blue Bombers	W 32–27	7–4	TSN	Investors Group Field	33,134	Recap
14	12	Sat, Sept 15	7:30 p.m. CST	vs. Ottawa Redblacks	L 25–30	7–5	TSN/RDS	Mosaic Stadium	33,350	Recap
15	13	Sat, Sept 22	5:00 p.m. CST	at Toronto Argonauts	W 30–29	8–5	TSN	BMO Field	14,479	Recap
16	14	Sun, Sept 30	11:00 a.m. CST	at Montreal Alouettes	W 34–29	9–5	TSN/RDS/ESPN2	Molson Stadium	18,370	Recap
17	15	Mon, Oct 8	2:00 p.m. CST	vs. Edmonton Eskimos	W 19–12	10–5	TSN	Mosaic Stadium	31,335	Recap
18	16	Sat, Oct 13	12:00 p.m. CST	at Winnipeg Blue Bombers	L 0–31	10–6	TSN	Investors Group Field	26,070	Recap
19	17	Sat, Oct 20	5:00 p.m. CST	at Calgary Stampeders	W 29–25	11–6	TSN	McMahon Stadium	30,868	Recap
20	18	Sat, Oct 27	5:00 p.m. CST	vs. BC Lions	W 35–16	12–6	TSN	Mosaic Stadium	30,091	Recap
21	Bye									

# Games played with primary home uniforms.
# Games played with white uniforms.
ǁ # ǁ Games played with retro alternate uniforms.

== Post-season ==
=== Schedule ===
Game	Date	Kickoff	Opponent	Results		TV	Venue	Attendance	Summary
Game	Date	Kickoff	Opponent	Score	Record	TV	Venue	Attendance	Summary
ǁ West Semi-Final ǁ	Sun, Nov 11	3:30 p.m. CST	vs. Winnipeg Blue Bombers	L 18–23	0–1	TSN/RDS/ESPN2	Mosaic Stadium	30,609	Recap

ǁ # ǁ Games played with retro alternate uniforms.

== Roster ==
2018 Saskatchewan Roughriders final roster
**Quarterbacks**: 16 Brandon Bridge; 17 Zach Collaros; 11 Drew Tate; 9 David Watford; **Running backs**: 41 Albert Awachie; 33 Cameron Marshall; 80 Spencer Moore; 8 Marcus Thigpen; **Receivers**: 6 Rob Bagg; 20 K. D. Cannon; 88 Caleb Holley; 89 Brian Jones; 87 Patrick Lavoie; 85 Kyran Moore; 82 Naaman Roosevelt; 84 Jordan Williams-Lambert	**Offensive linemen**: 53 Philip Blake G; 58 Takoby Cofield T; 68 Thaddeus Coleman T; 57 Brendon LaBatte G/C; 69 Braden Schram G; 59 Josiah St. John G; **Defensive linemen**: 92 Zack Evans DT; 91 Chad Geter DE; 39 Charleston Hughes DE; 7 Willie Jefferson DE; 98 Cory Johnson DT; 96 Curt Maggitt DE; 90 Jordan Reaves DE; 97 Eddie Steele DT	**Linebackers**: 0 Tobi Antigha; 45 Alexandre Chevrier; 47 Sam Eguavoen; 27 Kevin Francis; 32 Alexandre Gagné FB; 31 Sam Hurl; 4 Cameron Judge; 42 Derrick Moncrief; **Defensive backs**: 5 Crezdon Butler; 15 Mike Edem; 11 Ed Gainey; 24 Nick Marshall RB; 28 Loucheiz Purifoy	**Special teams**: 18 Josh Bartel P; 46 Jorgen Hus LS; 12 Brett Lauther K; **Practice roster**: 99 Mathieu Breton DT; 94 Tresor Buama-Mafuta DT; 37 Reggie Hall DB; 61 Simeon Rottier T; 39 Quinn Van Gylswyk K; 25 Marcell Young DB; **Suspended**: 26 Matt Elam DB; -- Danny Sprukulis T	**Injured list**: 83 Devon Bailey WR; 52 Brandyn Bartlett LB; 66 Dariusz Bladek G; 93 Mic'hael Brooks DT; 19 Marc-Olivier Brouillette DB; 67 Dan Clark C; 51 Adrian Clarke LB; 21 Tyler Crapigna K; 35 Paul Dawson DE; 95 Lavar Edwards DE/DT; 1 Shaq Evans WR; 3 Jake Harty WR; 74 Makana Henry DT; 2 Jovon Johnson DB; 26 Christion Jones SB; 10 Tre Mason RB; 14 Denzel Radford DB; 86 Kenny Shaw SB; 43 Micah Teitz LB; 65 Terran Vaughn T; Italics indicate International player **Bold** indicates Global player

== Coaching staff ==
Saskatchewan Roughriders Staff
Front office: President and ceo – Craig Reynolds; General manager and director of football operations – Chris Jones; Director of Player Personnel and Canadian Scouting –; U.S. Scout – Ron Selesky; Manager of Media Relations & Football Communications – Ryan Pollock; Director of athletic therapy – Ivan Gutfriend; Manager of equipment – Gordon Gilroy; Manager of football research and development – Chad Hudson; Manager of football administration – Aaron Thompson; Head coaches: Head coach – Chris Jones; Assistant head coach – Stephen McAdoo; Offensive coaches: Offensive coordinator – Stephen McAdoo; Quarterbacks & Passing Game Coordinator – Steve Walsh; Offensive line – Mike Scheper; Wide receivers – Travis Moore; Running backs – Craig Davoren	Defensive coaches: Defensive coordinator – Chris Jones; Defensive line – Ed Philion; Linebackers – Cam Robinson; Defensive backs – Jason Shivers; Special teams coaches: Special teams coordinator – Craig Dickenson; Special teams assistant – Craig Davoren; Strength and conditioning: Strength and conditioning coordinator – Dan Farthing; → Coaching staff
