= 2017 Saskatchewan Roughriders season =

CFL team season

- General manager: Chris Jones
- Head coach: Chris Jones
- Home stadium: Mosaic Stadium

Results
- Record: 10–8
- Division place: 4th, West
- Playoffs: Lost East Final
- Team MOP: Duron Carter
- Team MOC: Henoc Muamba
- Team MOR: Tobi Antigha

Uniform

The 2017 Saskatchewan Roughriders season was the 60th season for the team in the Canadian Football League (CFL). It was the club's 108th year overall, and its 102nd season of play. The Roughriders improved upon their 5–13 record from 2016 and clinched a playoff spot with a win over the Calgary Stampeders on October 20, 2017. They finished in fourth place in the West Division and crossed over to the East Division playoffs for the third time in franchise history. They won their first ever East Semi-Final game by defeating the Ottawa Redblacks, but lost the following week to the Toronto Argonauts 25–21 in the last minute of the game.

This was the first season that the Roughriders were playing at their brand new stadium, Mosaic Stadium, following the previous 95 years at the site of Mosaic Stadium at Taylor Field. This was the second season under head coach and general manager Chris Jones. For the fifth consecutive season, the club held their training camp at Griffiths Stadium in Saskatoon with the main camp beginning on May 28.

== Offseason ==
=== Player transactions ===
On November 15, 2016, Regina was announced as the host city for the inaugural CFL Week, which took place in March 2017. Regina was the only place besides Toronto to host the CFL's National Combine. On November 28, 2016, the Roughriders announced the signings of Bryan Bennett, Terrance Campbell, Kenny Horsley, and Thomas Mayo.

On December 1, 2016, Roughriders running back Joe McKnight was fatally shot in Terrytown, Louisiana in a road rage incident.

On December 6, 2016, Roughriders defensive end Eric Norwood announced his retirement. On December 7, 2016, defensive back Justin Cox signed an extension with the Roughriders. On December 19, 2016, Roughriders linebacker Marvin Golding was suspended two games for violating the CFL's drug policy. On January 3, 2017, the Roughriders announced the signings of Daniel Thomas, Jordan Reaves and Kelvin Muamba. On January 6, 2017, the Roughriders announced the extensions of kicker Tyler Crapigna and defensive back Ed Gainey through the 2019 season. On January 11, 2017, the Roughriders announced the extension of defensive lineman Jonathan Newsome through the 2018 season.

On January 13, 2017, the Roughriders traded the rights of quarterback Darian Durant to the Montreal Alouettes in exchange for a fourth round selection in the 2017 CFL draft and a conditional second round selection in the 2018 CFL Draft. The Alouettes would then re-sign Durant to a three-year contract on January 19.

On January 14, 2017, the Roughriders released linebacker Jeff Knox, Jr. so he could sign a deal with the Tampa Bay Buccaneers of the National Football League. On January 20, 2017, the Roughriders announced the extension of defensive lineman Willie Jefferson. On January 23, 2017, the Roughriders announced the signing of quarterback Kevin Glenn, who was released by the Winnipeg Blue Bombers on January 6. This will be Glenn's third stint with the Roughriders.

On January 26, 2017, the Roughriders announced the signing of wide receiver Duron Carter. The following day, the Roughriders released Dylan Ainsworth, Shamawd Chambers, Mitchell Gale and Curtis Steele. Later in the day, the Roughriders signed defensive back Erick Dargan, and released defensive back Otha Foster so he could sign an NFL contract with the Baltimore Ravens.

On February 14, 2017, the Roughriders signed offensive lineman Derek Dennis. That same day, they signed Canadian running back Kienan LaFrance.

On February 15, 2017, the Roughriders signed Canadian safety Marc-Olivier Brouillette, running back Aaron Milton, offensive lineman Ryan White and 2012 CFL Most Outstanding player, international wide receiver Chad Owens. The next day, the Roughriders signed running back Cameron Marshall and released offensive lineman Andrew Jones.

On February 17, 2017, the Roughriders re-signed offensive lineman Thaddeus Coleman. On February 20, 2017, the Roughriders released linebacker Korey Jones.

=== CFL draft ===
The 2017 CFL draft took place on May 7, 2017. The Roughriders had the 2nd overall selection after a 5-13 season in 2016. The Roughriders had nine selections, as they gained three picks and lost one pick in trades. The team also forfeited their 3rd round selection when taking safety Kevin Francis in the 2016 Supplemental Draft.

| Round | Pick | Player | Position | School/Club team | Hometown |
|---|---|---|---|---|---|
| 1 | 2 | Cameron Judge | LB | California, Los Angeles | Moorpark, CA |
| 2 | 11 | Dariusz Bladek | OL | Bethune–Cookman | Kissimmee, FL |
| 4 | 30 | Antony Auclair | TE | Laval | Notre-Dame-des-Pins, QC |
| 4 | 32 | Eddie Meredith | OL | Western | Toronto, ON |
| 5 | 37 | Mitchell Picton | WR | Regina | Regina, SK |
| 6 | 46 | Danny Sprukulis | OL | Toronto | Oakville, ON |
| 7 | 55 | Alexandre Chevrier | LB | Sherbrooke | Pointe-Claire, QC |
| 7 | 57 | Emmanuel Adusei | DT | Carleton | London, ON |
| 8 | 64 | Marc Glaude | OL | Montreal | Beaconsfield, QC |

== Preseason ==
| Week | Date | Kickoff | Opponent | Results | | TV | Venue | Attendance | Summary |
| Week | Date | Kickoff | Opponent | Score | Record | TV | Venue | Attendance | Summary |
|---|---|---|---|---|---|---|---|---|---|
| A | Sat, June 10 | 7:00 p.m. CST | vs. Winnipeg Blue Bombers | T 25–25 | 0–0–1 | None | Mosaic Stadium | 33,350 | Recap |
| B | Fri, June 16 | 8:00 p.m. CST | at BC Lions | L 10–42 | 0–1–1 | TSN | BC Place | 15,632 | Recap |

# Games played with white uniforms.

== Regular season ==
=== Standings ===
West Division
| Team | GP | W | L | T | Pts | PF | PA | Div | Stk | |
|---|---|---|---|---|---|---|---|---|---|---|
| Calgary Stampeders | 18 | 13 | 4 | 1 | 27 | 523 | 349 | 7–3 | L3 | Details |
| Winnipeg Blue Bombers | 18 | 12 | 6 | 0 | 24 | 554 | 492 | 6–4 | W1 | Details |
| Edmonton Eskimos | 18 | 12 | 6 | 0 | 24 | 510 | 495 | 5–5 | W5 | Details |
| Saskatchewan Roughriders | 18 | 10 | 8 | 0 | 20 | 510 | 430 | 4–6 | L1 | Details |
| BC Lions | 18 | 7 | 11 | 0 | 14 | 469 | 501 | 3–7 | L1 | Details |

=== Schedule ===
| Week | Date | Kickoff | Opponent | Results | | TV | Venue | Attendance | Summary |
| Week | Date | Kickoff | Opponent | Score | Record | TV | Venue | Attendance | Summary |
|---|---|---|---|---|---|---|---|---|---|
| 1 | Thurs, June 22 | 5:30 p.m. CST | at Montreal Alouettes | L 16–17 | 0–1 | TSN/RDS/ESPNews | Molson Stadium | 20,129 | Recap |
| 2 | Sat, July 1 | 7:00 p.m. CST | vs. Winnipeg Blue Bombers | L 40–43 (2OT) | 0–2 | TSN/RDS/ESPNews | Mosaic Stadium | 33,350 | Recap |
| 3 | Sat, July 8 | 8:00 p.m. CST | vs. Hamilton Tiger-Cats | W 37–20 | 1–2 | TSN/ESPN2 | Mosaic Stadium | 33,050 | Recap |
| 4 | Bye | | | | | | | | |
| 5 | Sat, July 22 | 7:00 p.m. CST | at Calgary Stampeders | L 10–27 | 1–3 | TSN | McMahon Stadium | 30,274 | Recap |
| 6 | Sat, July 29 | 4:30 p.m. CST | vs. Toronto Argonauts | W 38–27 | 2–3 | TSN | Mosaic Stadium | 33,350 | Recap |
| 7 | Sat, Aug 5 | 5:00 p.m. CST | at BC Lions | L 15–30 | 2–4 | TSN | BC Place | 23,415 | Recap |
| 8 | Sun, Aug 13 | 6:00 p.m. CST | vs. BC Lions | W 41–8 | 3–4 | TSN/ESPN2 | Mosaic Stadium | 33,350 | Recap |
| 9 | Bye | | | | | | | | |
| 10 | Fri, Aug 25 | 7:30 p.m. CST | at Edmonton Eskimos | W 54–31 | 4–4 | TSN | Commonwealth Stadium | 41,738 | Recap |
| ǁ11ǁ | Sun, Sept 3 | 2:00 p.m. CST | vs. Winnipeg Blue Bombers | W 38–24 | 5–4 | TSN | Mosaic Stadium | 33,350 | Recap |
| 12 | Sat, Sept 9 | 1:00 p.m. CST | at Winnipeg Blue Bombers | L 28–48 | 5–5 | TSN | Investors Group Field | 33,134 | Recap |
| 13 | Fri, Sept 15 | 5:00 p.m. CST | at Hamilton Tiger-Cats | W 27–19 | 6–5 | TSN/RDS | Tim Hortons Field | 23,604 | Recap |
| 14 | Sun, Sept 24 | 2:00 p.m. CST | vs. Calgary Stampeders | L 9–15 | 6–6 | TSN/ESPN2 | Mosaic Stadium | 33,350 | Recap |
| 15 | Fri, Sept 29 | 5:00 p.m. CST | at Ottawa Redblacks | W 18–17 | 7–6 | TSN | TD Place Stadium | 24,893 | Recap |
| 16 | Sat, Oct 7 | 2:00 p.m. CST | at Toronto Argonauts | W 27–24 | 8–6 | TSN/RDS2 | BMO Field | 15,102 | Recap |
| ǁ17ǁ | Fri, Oct 13 | 8:00 p.m. CST | vs. Ottawa Redblacks | L 32–33 | 8–7 | TSN | Mosaic Stadium | 33,350 | Recap |
| 18 | Fri, Oct 20 | 7:00 p.m. CST | at Calgary Stampeders | W 30–7 | 9–7 | TSN | McMahon Stadium | 27,316 | Recap |
| 19 | Fri, Oct 27 | 7:30 p.m. CST | vs. Montreal Alouettes | W 37–12 | 10–7 | TSN/RDS | Mosaic Stadium | 30,083 | Recap |
| 20 | Sat, Nov 4 | 5:00 p.m. CST | vs. Edmonton Eskimos | L 13–28 | 10–8 | TSN | Mosaic Stadium | 31,627 | Recap |

# Games played with primary home uniforms.
# Games played with white uniforms.
ǁ # ǁ Games played with retro alternate uniforms.

== Post-season ==
=== Schedule ===
| Game | Date | Kickoff | Opponent | Results | | TV | Venue | Attendance | Summary |
| Game | Date | Kickoff | Opponent | Score | Record | TV | Venue | Attendance | Summary |
|---|---|---|---|---|---|---|---|---|---|
| East Semi-Final | Sun, Nov 12 | 12:00 p.m. CST | at Ottawa Redblacks | W 31–20 | 1–0 | TSN/RDS/ESPN2 | TD Place Stadium | 24,107 | Recap |
| East Final | Sun, Nov 19 | 12:00 p.m. CST | at Toronto Argonauts | L 21–25 | 1–1 | TSN/RDS/ESPNews | BMO Field | 24,929 | Recap |

# Games played with white uniforms.

== Roster ==
2017 Saskatchewan Roughriders final roster
| **Quarterbacks**: 3 Vernon Adams; 16 Brandon Bridge; 5 Kevin Glenn; **Running backs**: 29 Kienan LaFrance; 80 Spencer Moore; 22 Greg Morris; 8 Marcus Thigpen; **Receivers**: 6 Rob Bagg; 89 Duron Carter DB; 81 Bakari Grant; 88 Caleb Holley; 26 Christion Jones; 2 Chad Owens; 82 Naaman Roosevelt; 87 Joshua Stanford | **Offensive linemen**: 66 Dariusz Bladek G; 53 Bruce Campbell T; 67 Dan Clark C; 68 Thaddeus Coleman T; 63 Derek Dennis G/T; 54 Peter Dyakowski G; 59 Josiah St. John G; **Defensive linemen**: 92 Tobi Antigha DE; 77 Rakim Cox DT/DE; 74 Makana Henry DT; 7 Willie Jefferson DE; 99 A.C. Leonard DE; 98 Ese Mrabure-Ajufo DT/DE; 97 Eddie Steele DT | **Linebackers**: 52 Brandyn Bartlett; 47 Sam Eguavoen; 49 Jeff Knox; 42 Derrick Moncrief; 10 Henoc Muamba; **Defensive backs**: 0 Elie Bouka; 19 Marc-Olivier Brouillette; 17 Crezdon Butler; 15 Mike Edem; 11 Ed Gainey; 24 Jeff Hecht; 1 Jovon Johnson; 14 Denzel Radford; 45 Kacy Rodgers | **Special teams**: 18 Josh Bartel P; 21 Tyler Crapigna K; 46 Jorgen Hus LS; **Practice roster**: 61 Emmanuel Adusei T; 41 Albert Awachie FB; 38 Alexandre Chevrier LB; 50 Alexandre Gagné LB; 78 Brendon Philogene G; 81 Mitchell Picton WR; 86 T. J. Thorpe WR; 65 Terran Vaughn G; 13 David Watford QB; 28 Melvin White DB; 37 Sam Williams DB; **Suspended list**: -- Emile Charron-Ligez DE/DT; -- Ahmad Fulwood WR; 28 Aaron Milton LB | **Injured list**: 83 Devon Bailey WR; 28 Shakir Bell RB; 91 Ivan Brown DE; 43 Erick Dargan DB; 9 Nic Demski SB; 20 Otha Foster DB; 27 Kevin Francis LB; 84 Chris Getzlaf SB; 85 Antwane Grant SB; 48 Dillon Grondin LB; 93 Nick James DT; 4 Cameron Judge LB; 57 Brendon LaBatte C/G; 51 Beau Landry LB; 95 Antonio Longino DE; 31 Glenn Love LB; 35 Chris Lyles DB; 32 Cameron Marshall RB; 25 Taylor Mays LB; 58 Eddie Meredith T; 96 Zach Minter DT; 30 Cameron Ontko LB; 33 Trent Richardson RB; 39 Quinn Van Gylswyk K; 12 Marquise Williams QB; 62 Jeremy Zver T; Italics indicate International player **Bold** indicates Global player |

== Coaching staff ==
Saskatchewan Roughriders Staff
| Front office: President and ceo – Craig Reynolds; General manager and director of football operations – Chris Jones; U.S. Scout – Ron Selesky; Manager of Media Relations & Football Communications – Ryan Pollock; Director of athletic therapy – Ivan Gutfriend; Manager of equipment – Gordon Gilroy; Manager of football research and development – Chad Hudson; Manager of football administration – Aaron Thompson; Head coaches: Head coach – Chris Jones; Assistant head coach – Stephen McAdoo; Offensive coaches: Offensive coordinator – Stephen McAdoo; Quarterbacks & Passing Game Coordinator – Jarious Jackson; Offensive line – Mike Scheper; Wide Receivers - Markus Howell; Running backs – Craig Davoren | Defensive coaches: Defensive coordinator – Chris Jones; Defensive line – Ed Philion; Defensive backs – Jason Shivers; Special teams coaches: Special teams coordinator – Craig Dickenson; Special teams assistant – Craig Davoren; Strength and conditioning: Strength and conditioning coordinator – Dan Farthing; → Coaching staff |
