= KACY (disambiguation) =

KACY is a radio station (102.5 FM) licensed to Arkansas City, Kansas, United States.

KACY or Kacy may also refer to:

== People ==
- Kacy Andrews (born 1969), American film producer
- Kacy Catanzaro (born 1990), American professional wrestler and former gymnast
- Kacy Crowley, American singer-songwriter
- Kacy Duke, American spokesmodel
- Kacy Hill (born 1994), American singer-songwriter
- Kacy Rodgers (born 1969), American coach
- Kacy Rodgers II (born 1992), American football player
- Nik Kacy (born 1975), Hong Kong fashion designer

== Radio and television stations ==
- KACY (TV), a former television station licensed to serve Festus, Missouri, United States
- KFXZ (AM), a radio station (1520 AM) licensed to serve Lafayette, Louisiana, United States, which held the call sign KACY from 1990 to 1996
- KTRP (AM), a radio station (1450 AM) licensed to Notus, Idaho, United States, which held the call sign KACY from 1984 to 1990
- KVEN, a radio station (1520 AM) licensed to Port Hueneme, California, United States, which held the call sign KACY from 1958 to 1984
- KCAQ, a radio station (104.7 FM) licensed to serve Oxnard, California, which held the call sign KACY-FM from 1978 to 1983

== Other uses ==
- the ICAO code for Atlantic City International Airport
