= Mike Edem =

Nigerian-Canadian gridiron football player (born 1989)

No. 15
- Position: Defensive back

Personal information
- Born: July 11, 1989 (age 37); Lagos, Nigeria
- Listed height: 6 ft 1 in (1.85 m)
- Listed weight: 200 lb (91 kg)

Career information
- High school: St. Edmund Campion Secondary
- University: Calgary; McGill
- CFL draft: 2013: 1st round, 3rd overall pick

Career history
- 2013–2015: Montreal Alouettes
- 2015: Hamilton Tiger-Cats
- 2016: BC Lions
- 2017–2022: Saskatchewan Roughriders

Awards and highlights
- CFL East All-Star (2013); CFL West All-Star (2019)
- Stats at CFL.ca

Anie-Ebiet Michael Edem (born July 11, 1989) is a Nigerian-Canadian former professional football defensive back who played in the Canadian Football League (CFL). After the 2012 CIS season, he was ranked as the tenth best player in the Canadian Football League’s Amateur Scouting Bureau final rankings for players eligible in the 2013 CFL draft and sixth by players in Canadian Interuniversity Sport. Edem was drafted in the first round, third overall by the Montreal Alouettes and signed with the team on May 27, 2013. He played CIS football for the Calgary Dinos and McGill Redmen.

== Early life ==
Edem was born in Lagos, Nigeria, and moved to Brampton, Ontario when he was 13.

== Professional career ==
=== Montreal Alouettes ===
Edem was drafted by the Montreal Alouettes of the Canadian Football League with the 3rd overall selection in the 2013 CFL draft. Edem played in all 18 games of the regular season, including 15 starts at safety. He finished the season with 49 tackles, nine special teams tackles, five sacks, three interceptions and four fumble recoveries en route to being named an East Division All-Star. Following the season, he was nominated as the Als Most Outstanding Canadian and Most Outstanding Rookie. He dressed in 17 games in 2014 while only starting one, registering five tackles and one interception. Edem then dressed in only four games in 2015.

=== Hamilton Tiger-Cats ===
Edem was traded to the Hamilton Tiger-Cats on October 14, 2015 for a sixth round 2016 CFL draft pick and a conditional seventh round 2017 CFL draft pick. He played in four regular season games and both playoff games.

=== BC Lions ===
Edem became a free agent on February 9, 2016 and signed a two-year contract with the BC Lions that same day. In one season with the Lions Edem played in all but one of the 18 regular season games recording 37 defensive tackles and 2 interceptions.

=== Saskatchewan Roughriders ===
On May 11, 2017 the Lions traded Edem and a conditional selection in the 2018 CFL draft to the Saskatchewan Roughriders for a conditional selection in 2018. After only contributing in a back-up and special teams role in 2017, Mike Edem had a breakout year with the Roughriders in 2018, contributing with a career high 61 defensive tackles, 10 special teams tackles, and two interceptions. On January 31, 2019 Edem and the Roughriders agreed to a two-year contract extension. He re-signed to a one-year contract extension with the team on December 16, 2020. Edem started the first five games of the 2021 season at safety for the Riders, contributing with 11 defensive tackles and one forced fumble. He suffered a broken wrist in the Banjo Bowl match against the Blue Bombers. In late October it was announced that he would miss the remainder of the 2021 season. He became a free agent after the 2022 season.
