= Brandon Bridge =

Canadian gridiron football player (born 1992)

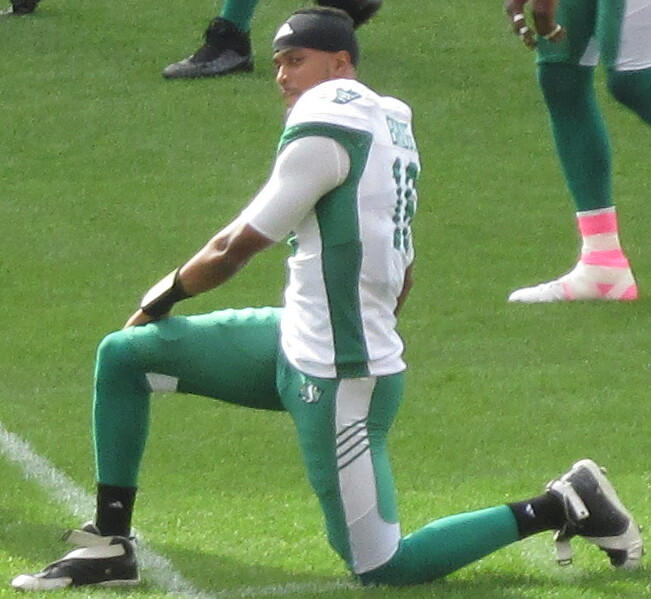
- Bridge with the Saskatchewan Roughriders in 2017

York Lions
- Title: Assistant quarterbacks coach
- CFL status: National

Personal information
- Born: March 21, 1992 (age 34); Toronto, Ontario, Canada
- Listed height: 6 ft 5 in (1.96 m)
- Listed weight: 235 lb (107 kg)

Career information
- Position: Quarterback (No. 1, 16, 2, 10)
- High school: St. Marcellinus
- College: South Alabama
- CFL draft: 2015: 4th round, 31st overall pick

Career history

Playing
- 2015–2016: Montreal Alouettes
- 2016–2018: Saskatchewan Roughriders
- 2019: Toronto Argonauts*
- 2019: Montreal Alouettes
- 2019: BC Lions
- * Offseason or practice squad member only

Coaching
- 2026–present: York Lions

Career CFL statistics
- Pass completions: 225
- Pass attempts: 344
- Passing yards: 2,679
- TD–INT: 14–10
- Passer rating: 90.5
- Stats at Pro Football Reference
- Stats at CFL.ca

Brandon Colin Bridge (born March 21, 1992), nicknamed Air Canada, is a Canadian former professional football quarterback and is currently the assistant quarterbacks coach for the York Lions of U Sports football. He played in the Canadian Football League (CFL) with the Montreal Alouettes, Saskatchewan Roughriders, and BC Lions. He was drafted in the fourth round, 31st overall, by the Alouettes in the 2015 CFL draft. He played college football at Alcorn State and South Alabama.

== Early life ==
Bridge attended St. Marcellinus Secondary School in Mississauga, Ontario, Canada. He finished his career with school records in touchdown passes and passing yards. Bridge was rated by Rivals.com as a two-star recruit. While attending Secondary school, he committed to Alcorn State University to play college football in the United States.

== College career ==
=== Alcorn State ===
Bridge played at Alcorn State in 2010 and 2011. As a freshman, he completed 150 of 291 passes for 2,086 yards and 19 touchdowns. He also rushed for 601 yards on 120 carries with eight touchdowns. In 2011, he completed 49 of 98 passes for 632 yards and five scores and rushed for 121 yards and two touchdowns on 39 carries.

=== South Alabama ===
In 2012, Bridge transferred to University of South Alabama. After sitting out 2012 due to transfer rules, he played in nine games in 2013. For the season, he completed 29 of 66 pass attempts for 398 yards and one touchdown, adding 170 yards and a touchdown on 37 carries. As a senior in 2014, Bridge completed 160 of 307 passes 1,927 yards, 15 touchdowns and eight interceptions.

== Professional career ==
Bridge attended the 2015 NFL Combine but was not selected in the 2015 NFL draft. He attended the rookie mini-camp of the Dallas Cowboys but was not signed.

=== Montreal Alouettes (first stint) ===
He was selected by the Montreal Alouettes in the fourth round of the 2015 CFL draft. On May 25, 2015, he signed a two-year contract with Montreal. On June 13, he played in his first game with the team, a preseason match against the Ottawa Redblacks. One of four QBs used in the game by Montreal, Bridge went 4 for 8, threw for 52 yards and a touchdown and drew praise from head coach Tom Higgins for his performance.

Bridge began the 2015 season as the Al's third QB on the depth chart. He made his CFL regular season debut on June 25, 2015 (Week 1 of the 2015 season), after injuries to Jonathan Crompton and Dan LeFevour. He completed 5 of 10 passes for 62 yards and one interception. He became the first Canadian quarterback to play in a regular season CFL game since Danny Brannagan in 2010. Bridge dressed as the back-up to fellow rookie, Rakeem Cato, in the following game and didn't get a chance to play until the last game of the season due to Cato's strong play and veteran players returning from injury. Bridge had his first career start on November 8, 2015 in an overtime loss to the Saskatchewan Roughriders. He completed 21 of 30 passes for 220 yards and threw the first two touchdown passes of his career.

When Vernon Adams was signed by the Alouettes, Bridge was relegated to fourth-string status. However, with Adams and starter, Kevin Glenn, being injured, he dressed as the third-string quarterback for four of the Alouettes' first six games. He scored his first CFL touchdown during the opening week game against the Winnipeg Blue Bombers on June 24, 2016. With Glenn, Cato, and Adams all healthy, Bridge was asked to take a pay cut, leading to him requesting his release following the sixth game of the season. On August 1, 2016, Bridge was released by the Alouettes.

=== Saskatchewan Roughriders ===
On August 8, 2016, Brandon Bridge worked out with the Saskatchewan Roughriders. He officially signed with the team on August 10, 2016. In January 2017, the Riders traded away starting quarterback Darian Durant, moving Brandon Bridge into competition for the starting role for the 2017 CFL season. However, during the off-season the Riders added CFL veteran Kevin Glenn, former NFL Pro-Bowler Vince Young and Bryan Bennett. Both Vince Young and Bryan Bennett were released before the start of the season, leaving Bridge as the back-up quarterback behind Kevin Glenn. Due to an injury to Glenn, Bridge started the game against the Hamilton Tiger-Cats on September 15, 2017, completing 21 of 31 passes for 231 yards and 3 touchdowns as the Roughriders won by a score of 27–19. He was the first Canadian quarterback to throw three touchdowns in a game since Greg Vavra in 1984. In the off-season the Roughriders acquired quarterback Zach Collaros, relegating Bridge to a backup role alongside David Watford. Bridge started four regular season games in 2018, and also started the Western Semi-Final playoff game, becoming the first Canadian quarterback to start a playoff game since Gerry Dattilio did so in 1984. Bridge was unable to lead the Riders to victory, falling 23–18 to Winnipeg, ending their season. He became a free agent on February 12, 2019.

=== Toronto Argonauts ===
On February 24, 2019, the Toronto Argonauts announced that they had signed Bridge to a contract. The contract is reportedly for one year. Bridge was competing with fellow quarterbacks James Franklin, Mcleod Bethel Thompson, Michael O’Connor and Dakota Prukop for a roster spot. He was released by the Argos on June 8, 2019 after the conclusion of the preseason.

=== Montreal Alouettes (second stint) ===
Bridge was signed by the Montreal Alouettes on June 22, 2019 following an injury to starting quarterback Antonio Pipkin during their first game of the season. On July 31, 2019 Bridge was released from the Alouettes roster.

=== BC Lions ===
Nearing the end of the 2019 season, BC Lions starting quarterback Mike Reilly suffered what was reported to be a broken wrist which prompted the Lions to sign Bridge to a contract on October 14, 2019. In the season finale against the Calgary Stampeders, Bridge came in after halftime and ignited the Lions offense, nearly leading the team to a comeback but coming up short in a 21–16 loss. In his only action for 2019, Bridge completed 14 out of 22 passes for 194 yards, one touchdown, and two interceptions in one half of work.

== Career statistics ==
=== CFL ===
		Passing									Rushing
Year	Team	GA	GS	Comp	Att	Pct	Yards	TD	Int	Rating	Att	Yards	Avg	Long	TD
2015	MTL	11	1	26	40	65.0	282	2	1	91.9	18	59	3.3	22	0
2016	MTL	4	0	0	0	0.0	0	0	0	0.0	3	2	0.7	1	2
2016	SSK	12	0	11	13	84.6	163	0	0	124.8	4	23	5.8	16	1
2017	SSK	18	1	92	138	66.7	1,236	10	4	107.0	20	127	6.4	17	1
2018	SSK	18	4	82	131	62.6	804	1	3	72.8	25	110	4.6	16	0
2019	MTL	4	0	0	0	0.0	0	0	0	0.0	0	0	0.0	0	0
2019	BC	2	0	14	22	63.6	194	1	2	69.1	1	4	4.0	4	0
CFL totals		69	6	225	344	65.4	2,679	14	10	90.5	71	325	4.6	22	4

=== College ===
Season	Team	Passing					Rushing		
Season	Team	Cmp	Att	Yds	TD	Int	Att	Yds	TD
2010	Alcorn State	150	291	2,086	19	13	120	447	8
2011	Alcorn State	49	98	632	5	4	39	121	2
2013	South Alabama	29	66	398	1	2	37	170	1
2014	South Alabama	160	307	1,927	15	8	101	297	4
Career		388	762	5,043	40	27	297	1,035	15

== Legacy ==
While leaving open the possibility of a return in the future, Bridge chose to enter law enforcement following the 2019 CFL season, having not received an offer he found satisfactory to continue his playing career. Bridge set several milestones during his career; he was the first Canadian quarterback to see the field in 5 years when he started playing in 2015, his 3 touchdown passes in one game during 2016 were the first time that mark had been achieved by a Canadian pivot since 1984, and his 2018 playoff start was the first by a Canadian passer in 34 years. Throughout his career, Bridge expressed the desire to, "open up doors for the younger generation who are Canadians who want to play quarterback." Bridge met with CFL commissioner Randy Ambrosie to advocate for Canadian passers to be included in the team ratio, which was incorporated into the 2020 collective bargaining agreement between the league and the players' union. Former teammate Michael O'Connor acknowledged Bridge's impact for Canadian pivots like himself; "He moved the position forward and I owe a lot to him, but I’m looking to take that next step for us."

== Coaching career ==
Bridge joined the coaching staff of the York Lions as the assistant quarterbacks coach for the 2026 season.
