= Jerome Messam =

Canadian gridiron football player (born 1985)

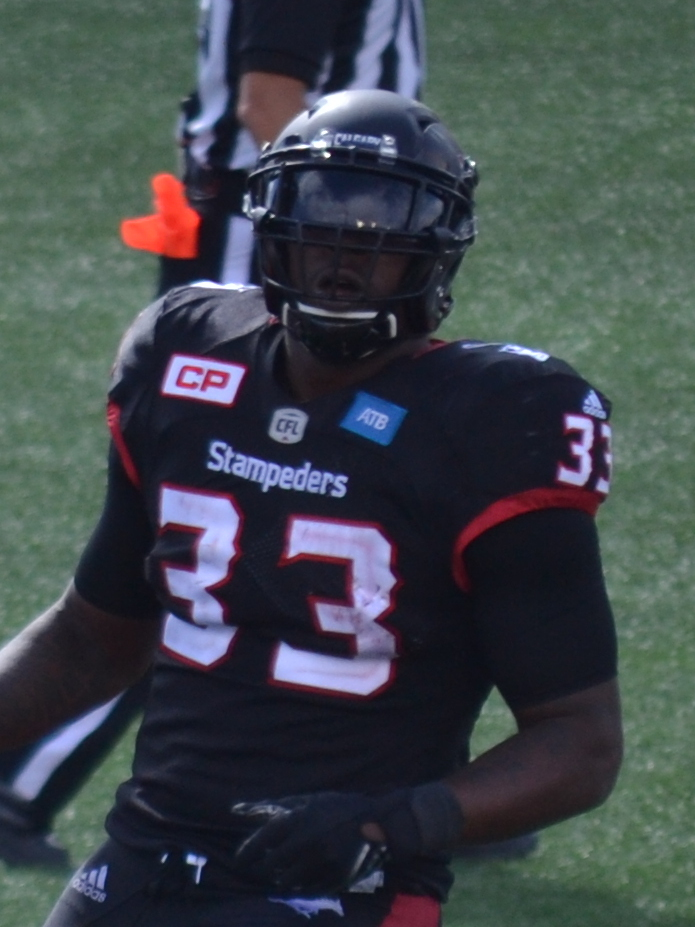
- Messam with the Calgary Stampeders in 2016

Profile
- Position: Running back

Personal information
- Born: April 2, 1985 (age 41); Brampton, Ontario, Canada
- Listed height: 6 ft 3 in (1.91 m)
- Listed weight: 255 lb (116 kg)

Career information
- College: Graceland

Career history
- 2010: BC Lions
- 2011: Edmonton Eskimos
- 2012: Miami Dolphins*
- 2012: Edmonton Eskimos
- 2013: Montreal Alouettes
- 2014–2015: Saskatchewan Roughriders
- 2015–2017: Calgary Stampeders
- 2018: Saskatchewan Roughriders
- * Offseason or practice squad member only

Awards and highlights
- 2× CFL Most Outstanding Canadian (2011, 2016); 2× Dr. Beattie Martin Trophy (2011, 2016); Eddie James Memorial Trophy (2011); Dick Suderman Trophy (2017); 2× CFL All-Star (2011, 2016); 3× CFL West All-Star (2011, 2015, 2016); CFL rushing touchdowns leader (2016)
- Stats at CFL.ca

Jerome Messam (born April 2, 1985) is a Canadian former professional football running back who played nine seasons in the Canadian Football League (CFL) for five teams. He was originally signed as an undrafted free agent by the BC Lions. After being traded to the Edmonton Eskimos, he became the seventh Canadian running back since 1955 and the first since 2000 to rush for over 1,000 yards while also winning the CFL's Most Outstanding Canadian Award. He won the award again in 2016 and was also the Grey Cup's Most Valuable Canadian in 2017. He is a two-time CFL All-Star and three-time CFL West All-Star. Messam played college football for Graceland University.

== College career ==
Following graduation from high school, Messam was deemed academically ineligible to attend an NCAA school, so he enrolled at the North Dakota State College of Science in 2005. While attending school there, he played for the NDSCS Wildcats where he rushed for over 1,000 yards as a freshman. After falling out of favour with the team's head coach, he moved on to Graceland University in 2007 to play for the Yellowjackets of the NAIA. That year, he rushed 168 times for 993 yards and 16 touchdowns. In January 2008, he declared eligible for the NFL and CFL drafts, forgoing his senior year, but Messam went undrafted. Following a knee injury that caused him to sit out the 2008 season, Messam returned to the Yellowjackets in 2009 and rushed for 1,075 yards on 197 carries and also scored 12 touchdowns during his senior season.

== CFL career ==
=== BC Lions ===
Messam signed as a free agent by the BC Lions of the Canadian Football League on May 14, 2010, who held his rights after he went undrafted in the 2008 CFL draft. He played in his first game on July 10, 2010 against the Saskatchewan Roughriders. He scored his first two touchdowns in the same against the Toronto Argonauts on September 11, 2010. Overall, Messam played in 17 games while carrying the ball 23 times for 93 yards and two touchdowns.

=== Edmonton Eskimos ===
During Lions training camp, June 19, 2011, Messam was traded to the Edmonton Eskimos for a fifth round draft pick in the 2013 CFL draft. Messam became the starting running back for the Eskimos in the 2011 CFL season. He became the first non-import player to rush for over 1,000 yards in a season since Sean Millington in 2000. Messam was named the Outstanding Canadian in July and October and was the CFL's Most Outstanding Canadian. Fans, Football Reporters of Canada (FRC) and CFL head coaches selected him for the 2011 CFL All-Star team. He played in 18 games and had 195 carries for 1,057 yards and six touchdowns, 7 receptions for 248 yards and two kick returns for 27 yards.

=== Miami Dolphins ===
Messam entered the option-year of his contract in 2012 and used that opportunity to sign with the National Football League's Miami Dolphins on February 15, 2012. He played in two preseason games, recording one reception for 10 yards and one rush attempt for minus-two yards. He was released by the Dolphins on August 25, 2012.

=== Edmonton Eskimos (II) ===
After missing half of the 2012 CFL season while with the Miami Dolphins, Messam re-signed with the Eskimos on August 30, 2012 The team had a crowded backfield which consisted of Hugh Charles and Cory Boyd, thereby reducing Messam's playing time. He returned in time for the Labour Day Classic on September 3, 2012 and recorded a modest seven carries for 32 yards. In nine games and two starts with the Eskimos, Messam only recorded 168 yards rushing and one touchdown.

=== Montreal Alouettes ===
On February 5, 2013, Messam was traded to the Montreal Alouettes for a 6th round pick in the 2013 CFL draft. He dressed in 15 games that season and started nine, following the injury to incumbent Brandon Whitaker. He was cut from the Montreal Alouettes on June 15, 2014 after the Alouettes did not want to pay him as a tailback while using him as a fullback.

=== Saskatchewan Roughriders ===
On July 8, 2014, Messam reportedly signed with the Saskatchewan Roughriders of the Canadian Football League. The Roughriders made the signing official on July 9, 2014. Messam made his Roughrider debut on July 12, 2014 against the BC Lions and proceeded to play in 14 games during the 2014 CFL season while starting in two. He posted a career best rushing average of 5.5 yards per carry (70 attempts for 382 yards). On February 6, 2015, Messam and the Riders agreed to a contract extension. Messam was the starting running back for the Roughriders for the 2015 season while sharing time with Anthony Allen. Despite the shared playing time, he managed to rush for 826 yards on 135 carries for a 6.1 yard average to go along with two touchdowns. He also recorded a career-high with 47 receptions for 464 yards and did this all in 15 games with the Roughriders.

=== Calgary Stampeders ===
On October 14, 2015, the CFL's trade deadline day, Messam was traded to the Calgary Stampeders for Tyler Crapigna and an exchange of 2016 CFL draft picks. At the time, Messam was the league's second-leading rusher, but was in the final year of his contract and the Roughriders had already been eliminated from the playoffs. Calgary's Jon Cornish was injured due to a concussion, so Messam started the final two games of the season for the Stampeders, recording 28 carries for 180 yards. Combined, he played and started in 17 games, rushing for 1,006 yards on 163 carries, marking the second time in his career that he had eclipsed the 1,000-yard rushing mark. His 6.2-yard rushing average led all starting running backs. He also had a career-high 53 receptions for 497 yards, all of which earned him his second Western All-Star award. Cornish retired during the following off-season, paving the way for Messam to become the team's full-time starter. On the night before 2016 free agency, Messam re-signed with the Stampeders on February 9, 2016.

As the new full-time starter for the Stamps Messam had a career year in 2016. For the first time in his career he played in all 18 regular season games and set career highs in carries (206), rushing yards (1,198), touchdowns (11), and receptions (54). He also won the award for Most Outstanding Canadian, for the second time in his career. Messam had a strong season in 2017 as well, finishing third in rushing yards with 1,016 (trailing Andrew Harris and William Powell) on 215 carries with nine touchdowns. Messam scored two touchdowns in the 105th Grey Cup and received the Dick Suderman Trophy as the game's most valuable Canadian.

=== Saskatchewan Roughriders (II) ===
Heading into 2018 free agency, the Stampeders decided to move on from Messam. Messam tested free agency and agreed to terms with the Saskatchewan Roughriders on February 13, 2018. He played in five games for the Roughriders, registering 52 carries for 205 rushing yards. He was released on July 30, 2018 following criminal charges for voyeurism from 2016. The Canadian Football League announced at the same time that the league would not file a contract if any future team attempts to sign him, ending his CFL career.

=== Statistics ===
		Rushing					Receiving
Year	Team	Games	Att	Yards	Avg	TD	Rec	Yards	Avg	TD
2010	BC	17	23	92	4.0	2	5	57	11.4	0
2011	EDM	18	195	1,057	5.4	6	27	248	9.2	0
2012	EDM	12	42	168	4.0	1	8	76	9.5	0
2013	MTL	15	121	565	4.7	2	31	317	10.2	1
2014	SSK	14	70	382	5.5	1	8	134	16.8	0
2015	SSK	15	135	826	6.1	2	47	464	9.9	0
2015	CGY	2	28	180	6.4	0	6	33	5.5	0
2016	CGY	18	206	1,198	5.8	11	54	485	9.0	1
2017	CGY	17	215	1,016	4.7	9	33	183	5.5	0
2018	SSK	5	52	205	3.9	0	6	25	4.2	0
CFL totals		131	1,087	5,689	5.2	34	225	2,022	9.0	2
