= Willie Jefferson =

American gridiron football player (born 1991)

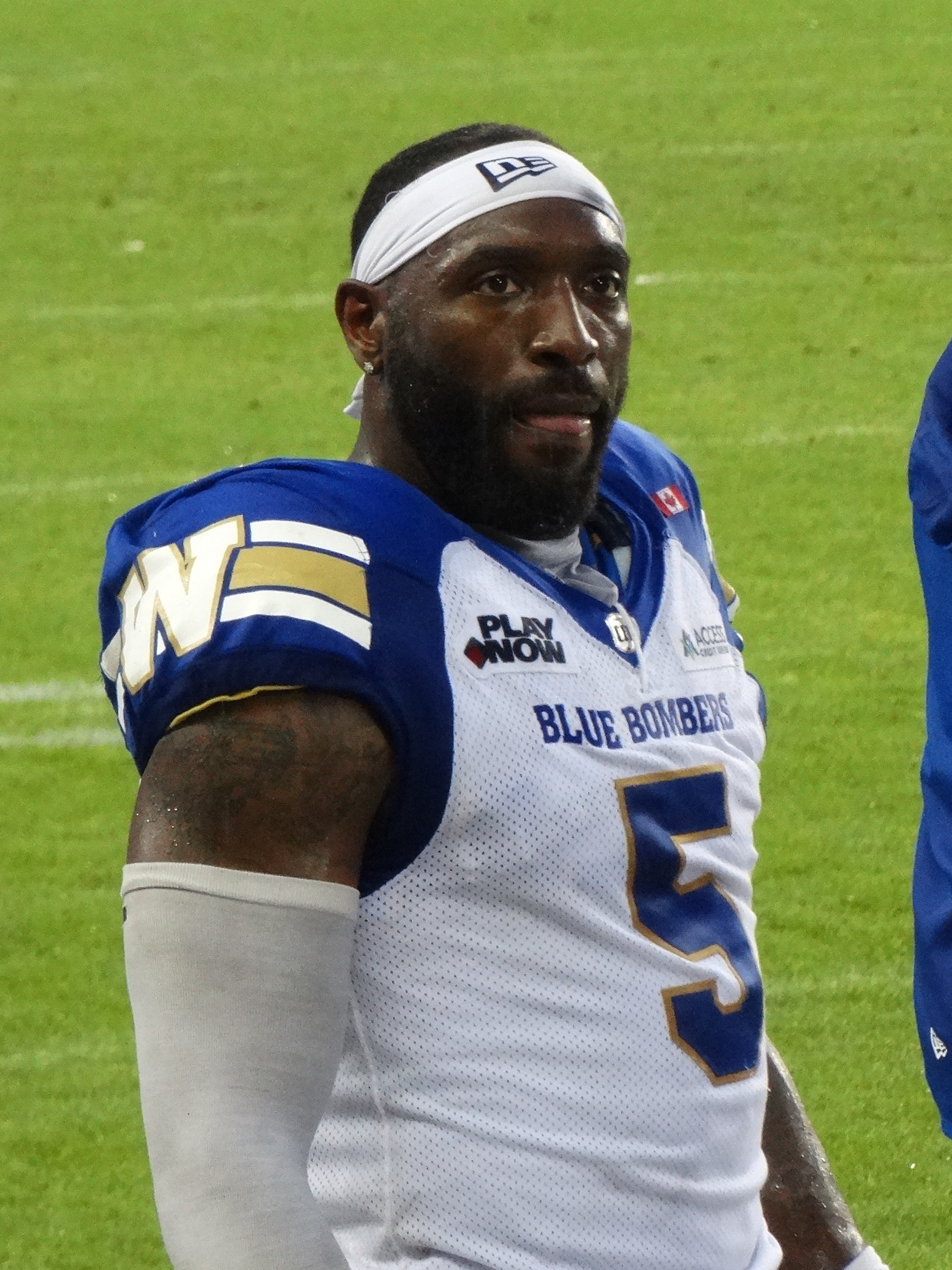
- Jefferson with the Winnipeg Blue Bombers in 2025

No. 5 – Winnipeg Blue Bombers
- Position: Defensive end
- Roster status: Active
- CFL status: American

Personal information
- Born: January 31, 1991 (age 35); Beaumont, Texas, U.S.
- Listed height: 6 ft 7 in (2.01 m)
- Listed weight: 252 lb (114 kg)

Career information
- High school: Ozen High (TX)
- College: Stephen F. Austin; Baylor

Career history
- Houston Texans (2013); Buffalo Bills (2014)*; Edmonton Eskimos (2014–2015); Washington Redskins (2016)*; Saskatchewan Roughriders (2016–2018); Winnipeg Blue Bombers (2019–present)
- * Offseason or practice squad member only

Awards and highlights
- 3× Grey Cup champion (2015, 2019, 2021); CFL's Most Outstanding Defensive Player (2019); Norm Fieldgate Trophy (2019); 6× CFL All-Star (2017, 2018, 2019, 2021, 2023, 2024); 7× CFL West All-Star (2017, 2018, 2019, 2021, 2022, 2023, 2024)

Career CFL statistics as of 2025
- Games played: 178
- Def tackles: 267
- Sacks: 77
- Forced fumbles: 22
- Interceptions: 6
- Pass knockdowns: 93
- Defensive touchdowns: 5
- Stats at Pro Football Reference
- Stats at CFL.ca

Willie Hebert Jefferson III (born January 31, 1991) is an American professional football defensive end for the Winnipeg Blue Bombers of the Canadian Football League (CFL). Jefferson is a three-time Grey Cup champion, winning with the Edmonton Eskimos in 2015 and twice more with the Blue Bombers in 2019 and 2021. He was named the CFL's Most Outstanding Defensive Player in 2019 with the Bombers, and is a six-time CFL All-Star and seven-time CFL West All-Star. He has also been a member of the Houston Texans, Buffalo Bills, Washington Redskins, and Saskatchewan Roughriders. Jefferson played college football for the Stephen F. Austin Lumberjacks and Baylor Bears.

== Early life ==
Jefferson attended Ozen High School. He was selected to the 4A all-state second-team in his senior year in high school. He was selected to the First-team All-District 20-4 and Port Arthur News Super Team while at high school.

== College career ==
Jefferson started his college football career as a wide receiver for the Baylor Bears in 2009 and moved to tight end for the 2010 season. However, he was dismissed from the team in October 2010 after he and teammate Josh Gordon were found asleep in Jefferson's car at a local Taco Bell with marijuana in the car. Jefferson, who was driving, was kicked off the team due to it being his second violation.

Jefferson transferred to Stephen F. Austin University to play for the Lumberjacks and was named 2011 Southland Conference Newcomer of the Year in his Junior season. He led the Southland Conference in sacks with 16. He was selected to the Sports Network All-America second team, Phil Steele's Magazine All-America third team.

== Professional career ==
Pre-draft measurables
Height	Weight	Arm length	Hand span	Wingspan	40-yard dash	10-yard split	20-yard split	20-yard shuttle	Three-cone drill	Vertical jump	Broad jump	Bench press
6 ft 5 7/8 in (1.98 m)	233 lb (106 kg)	34 1/2 in (0.88 m)	9 1/2 in (0.24 m)	6 ft 10 1/2 in (2.10 m)	4.73 s	1.68 s	2.76 s	4.76 s	7.43 s	33.5 in (0.85 m)	10 ft 4 in (3.15 m)	13 reps
All values from Pro Day

=== Houston Texans ===
On April 27, 2013, Jefferson signed with the Houston Texans as an undrafted free agent following the 2013 NFL draft. He appeared in six games for the Texans before being released on October 21, 2013, for unspecified violations of team rules prior to a game in Kansas City.

=== Buffalo Bills ===
After sitting out the remainder of the 2013 NFL season, Jefferson signed a reserve/future contract with the Buffalo Bills on January 16, 2014. However, he was released less than two months later on March 3, 2014.

=== Edmonton Eskimos ===
On April 3, 2014, Jefferson signed with the Edmonton Eskimos of the Canadian Football League (CFL). In his first CFL season, he played in 17 regular season games, starting in 10, here he had 19 defensive tackles, four sacks, six pass knockdowns, one fumble recovery, and one blocked kick. He also made his post-season debut as he played in two playoff games where he had one defensive tackle.

In 2015, Jefferson played in all 18 regular season games, starting in six, where he had 24 defensive tackles, six sacks, four pass knockdowns, and three forced fumbles. After playing in the team's West Final victory over the Calgary Stampeders, he played in his first Grey Cup championship game. He recorded one defensive tackle as the Eskimos defeated the Ottawa Redblacks in the 103rd Grey Cup. In the following off-season, Jefferson was granted an early release in order to pursue NFL opportunities.

=== Washington Redskins ===
Jefferson signed a futures contract with the Washington Redskins on January 14, 2016. On August 27, 2016, Jefferson was waived by the Redskins.

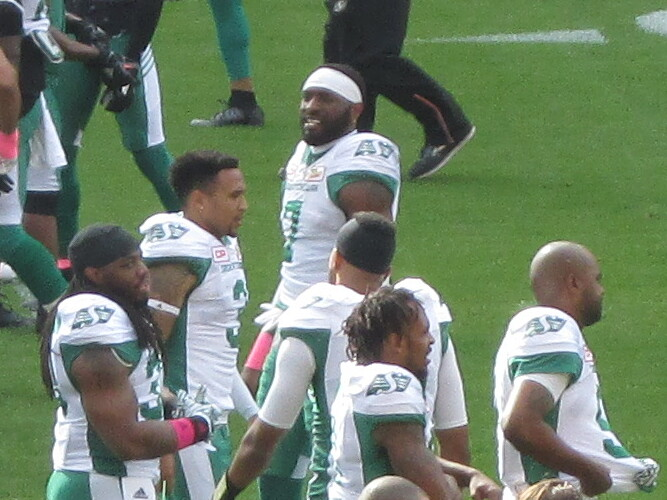
Jefferson (7) with the Roughriders in 2017.

=== Saskatchewan Roughriders ===
On September 28, 2016, Jefferson returned to the CFL and signed with the Saskatchewan Roughriders, rejoining his former head coach from Edmonton, Chris Jones. He played in the final five games of the 2016 season, where he had eight defensive tackles and three sacks.

Jefferson was named a CFL All-Star in 2017 after he played and started in all 18 regular season games and had a career-high 45 defensive tackles along with eight sacks, six knockdowns, and one fumble recovery for a touchdown. In 2018, he was nominated as the team's Most Outstanding Player and Most Outstanding Defensive Player after recording his first season with double digit sacks and a pair of interceptions returned for touchdowns. For his strong season, Jefferson was again named to the CFL All-Star Team alongside teammate Charleston Hughes. He became a free agent upon the expiry of his contract on February 12, 2019.

=== Winnipeg Blue Bombers ===
On February 12, 2019, it was announced that Jefferson had signed a one-year deal with the Winnipeg Blue Bombers through the 2019 season. Jefferson felt the Roughriders' offer did not match his market value; he was also courted by the Toronto Argonauts, but signed with the Blue Bombers for $210,000 CND. Jefferson's most notable performance came against Edmonton, where he recorded four tackles (two for a loss), three sacks, two forced fumbles, recovered another fumble, knocked down two passes, recovered an onside kick attempt, and scored a rouge when he kicked a fumble through the endzone.

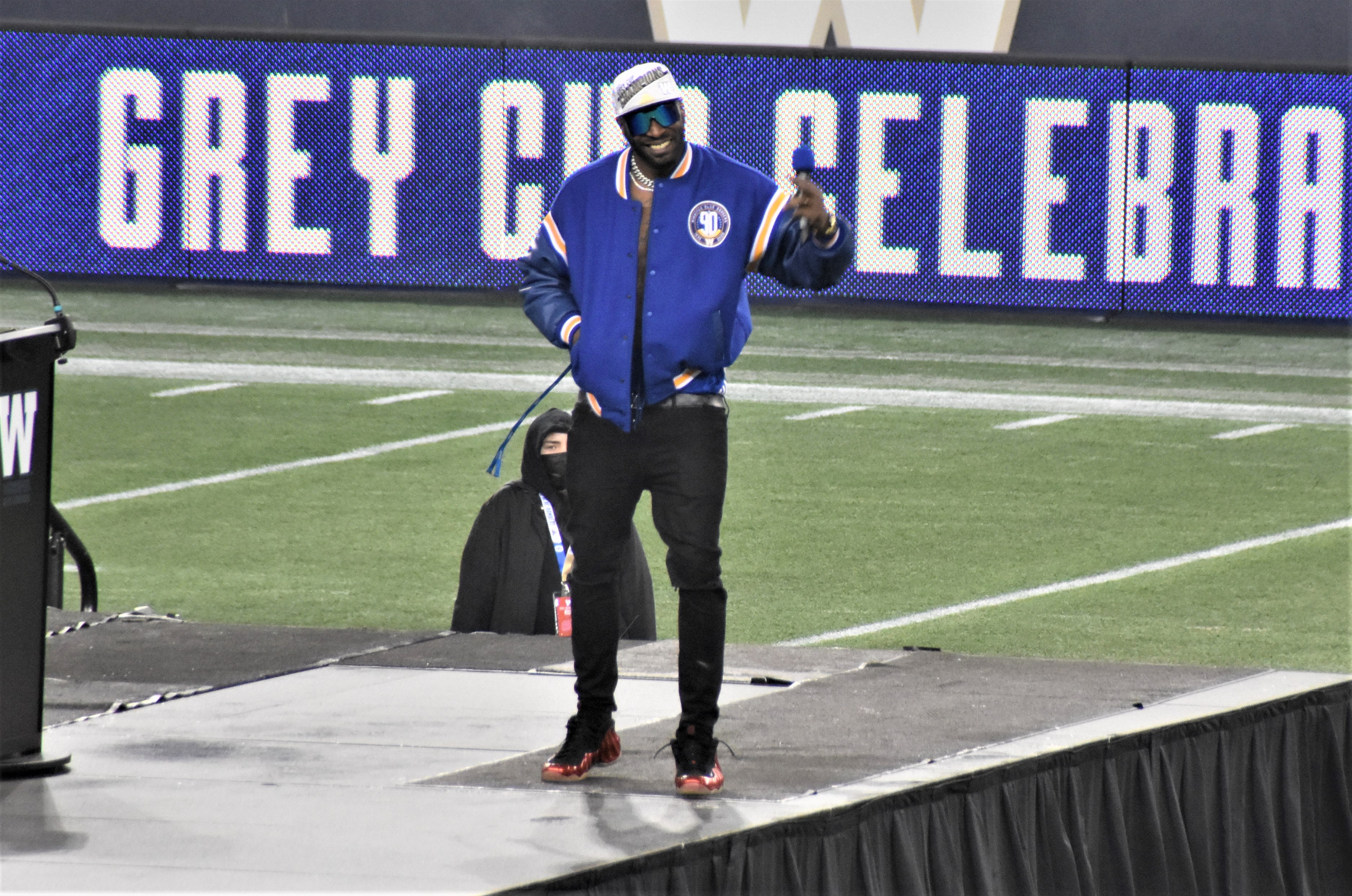
Jefferson at Winnipeg's 2021 Grey Cup celebration.

By season's end, Jefferson played in all 18 games and made 25 defensive tackles and caught an interception; he also set new career highs for sacks and forced fumbles, with 12 and six respectively. He also set the CFL record for a defensive lineman with 16 pass knockdowns. Jefferson's strong play in the playoffs, together with his fellow defensive linemen Jackson Jeffcoat, Drake Nevis, and Jake Thomas saw the Bombers defence control the games against the Calgary Stampeders and Saskatchewan Roughriders, to lead the Bombers to the 107th Grey Cup. In the 107th Grey Cup game, Jefferson had two tackles, three sacks, two forced fumbles, with a dominant performance that saw the Bombers end their 29-year Grey Cup drought. After the game he said that, "I just had to come out here and give it my all. I had my dad, my mom, my wife and my daughter. I couldn't come out here and play a mediocre game in front of my family." For the second consecutive year, Jefferson was nominated as both Most Outstanding Player and Most Outstanding Defensive Player for his team, where he ultimately won the CFL Most Outstanding Defensive Player Award for his performance over the course of the 2019 CFL season.

After the 2019 season, Jefferson had a tryout with the Miami Dolphins which had gone well and he turned down other NFL tryouts. However, prior to the 2020 season, Jefferson signed a two-year contract extension, keeping him in Winnipeg through the 2021 season at approximately $265,000 a year. Unfortunately, the 2020 CFL season was cancelled as a result of the pandemic but Jefferson returned to the Winnipeg Blue Bombers for the 2021 season.

Jefferson would help the Blue Bombers thrive in their title defending season in 2021. Winnipeg finished the season with the best record in the CFL and Jefferson and the Bombers defence led the league in fewest yards and points allowed. He finished the season with seven sacks, 18 tackles, three forced fumbles, and two interceptions with one of those returned for a touchdown. Jefferson's stellar play meant that he was named a CFL All-Star for the fourth season in a row. The Bombers would defeat the Roughriders in the West Final to go to the 108th Grey Cup and defend their title. In the 2021 Grey Cup final game, Jefferson and the Blue Bombers top-rated defensive unit helped the team to their 12th Grey Cup title, and second in a row, defeating the hometown Hamilton Tiger-Cats in overtime, by a score of 33–25. After the extra time win, Jefferson said that "We're behind enemy lines, fans on our backs, city against us and we had to come out here and show these guys who we are. If it had to go into overtime to do that, that’s where we did it. It was tense, but we just had to stick it out. I had no doubt at all."

Jefferson continued his stellar play in the 2022 CFL season, contributing with 33 defensive tackles, seven sacks, two forced fumbles, one interception and one touchdown. Jefferson was named a West-Division All-Star for the fifth consecutive season. The Bombers went to their third consecutive Grey Cup match, but were defeated by the Toronto Argonauts in the 109th Grey Cup. Following the season, on November 26, 2022, Jefferson and the Bombers agreed to a one-year contract extension.

In 2023, Jefferson played and started in 17 regular season games where he recorded 21 defensive tackles, 11 sacks, a league-leading 13 pass knockdowns, and three forced fumbles. At the end of the year, he was named a Division and League All-Star once again. He played in his fifth Grey Cup game, and fourth consecutively, where he had one defensive tackle and one sack, but the Blue Bombers were defeated by the Montreal Alouettes. On December 4, 2023, Jefferson signed another one-year contract extension with the Blue Bombers.

== Statistics ==
=== CFL ===
Legend
*	Led the league
≈	Won the Grey Cup
±	Grey Cup MVP
**Bold**	Career high

		Defence
Year	Team	GP	GS	DT	QS	PKD	Int	FF	FR	TD
2014	EDM	17	10	19	4	6	0	0	1	0
2015	EDM	18	6	24	6	4	0	3	0	0
2016	SSK	5	4	8	3	4	0	1	0	0
2017	SSK	18	18	**45**	8	6	0	0	1	1
2018	SSK	18	18	34	10	3	2	2	**2**	**2**
2019	WPG	18	18	25	**12**	**16**	1	**6**	**2**	0
2020	WPG	Season cancelled
2021	WPG	14	14	18	7	5	2	3	1	1
2022	WPG	18	18	33	7	10	1	2	0	1
2023	WPG	17	17	21	11	13	0	3	0	0
2024	WPG	18	18	25	6	10	0	1	2	0
2025	WPG	17	17	15	3	**16**	0	1	0	0
CFL totals		178	158	267	77	93	6	22	9	5
