= Tyler Crapigna =

Canadian gridiron football player and coach (born 1992)

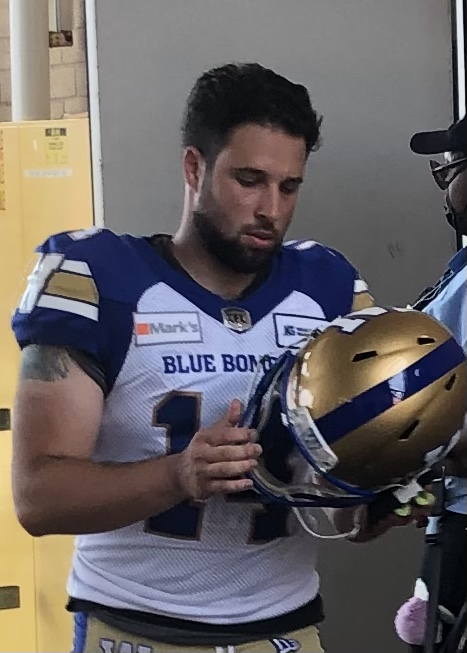
- Crapigna with the Winnipeg Blue Bombers in 2021

Profile
- Position: Kicker

Personal information
- Born: August 4, 1992 (age 34); Nepean, Ontario, Canada
- Listed height: 5 ft 7 in (1.70 m)
- Listed weight: 166 lb (75 kg)

Career information
- University: McMaster
- CFL draft: 2014: 5th round, 40th overall pick

Career history
- 2014–2015: Calgary Stampeders*
- 2015–2018: Saskatchewan Roughriders
- 2019: Toronto Argonauts*
- 2019: Montreal Alouettes*
- 2019: Toronto Argonauts
- 2020–2021: Montreal Alouettes*
- 2021: Winnipeg Blue Bombers
- * Offseason or practice squad member only
- 2022: Carleton Ravens (Kicker coach)

Awards and highlights
- Vanier Cup champion (2011); Grey Cup champion (2021)
- Stats at CFL.ca

Tyler Crapigna (born August 4, 1992) is a Canadian former professional football placekicker who played in the Canadian Football League (CFL). He played CIS football for the McMaster Marauders from 2010 to 2014 and kicked the game-winning field goal in double overtime of the 47th Vanier Cup.

== Professional career ==
=== Calgary Stampeders ===
Crapigna was drafted in the fifth round, 40th overall, in the 2014 CFL draft by the Calgary Stampeders. Following training camp, he returned for a fifth season with McMaster. He re-signed with the Stampeders on February 18, 2015, but spent most of the 2015 season on the team's practice roster.

=== Saskatchewan Roughriders ===
On October 14, 2015, just prior to the trade deadline, Crapigna was traded to the Saskatchewan Roughriders along with a third-round draft pick in the 2016 CFL draft for Jerome Messam and a fifth-round pick in that draft. He played in his first professional game on October 24, 2015 against the Edmonton Eskimos and was successful on his only field goal attempt in that game. In the following season, he became the team's primary placekicker and made 36 field goals out of 42 attempts. He kicked a career-long 53-yard field goal on July 22, 2016 against the Ottawa Redblacks. In 2017, he had the exact same field goal success rate, connecting on 36 of 42 attempts. He missed the entire 2018 season with an injury and was replaced by Brett Lauther. With Lauther having a very strong year, Crapigna was released by the Roughriders on May 7, 2019. Over the three seasons he played for the Saskatchewan Roughriders, Crapigna converted 76 out of 88 field goal attempts (86.4%).

=== Toronto Argonauts ===
Shortly after his release from Saskatchewan, Crapigna signed with the Toronto Argonauts on May 18, 2019. He attended training camp with the Argonauts in 2019, was part of the final cuts, and later signed a practice roster agreement with the Montreal Alouettes. He re-signed with the Argonauts on July 8, 2019 after the incumbent kicker, Drew Brown, was performing poorly. In 13 regular season games, he was successful on 22 field goals out of 27 attempts for a success rate of 81.5%.

=== Montreal Alouettes ===
On February 13, 2020, Crapigna was traded to the Montreal Alouettes for fellow kicker, Boris Bede. He did not play in 2020 due to the cancellation of the 2020 CFL season and was released during training camp for the following season on July 18, 2021.

=== Winnipeg Blue Bombers ===
On July 20, 2021, it was announced that Crapigna had signed with the Winnipeg Blue Bombers. He played in three games for the team, connecting on three of five field goal attempts, before spending the rest of the season on the injured list. He was on the injured list when the Blue Bombers won the 108th Grey Cup.

== Coaching career ==
For the 2022 U Sports football season, Crapigna served as the kicker coach for the Carleton Ravens.
