= Kevin Francis (Canadian football) =

Canadian gridiron football player (born 1993)

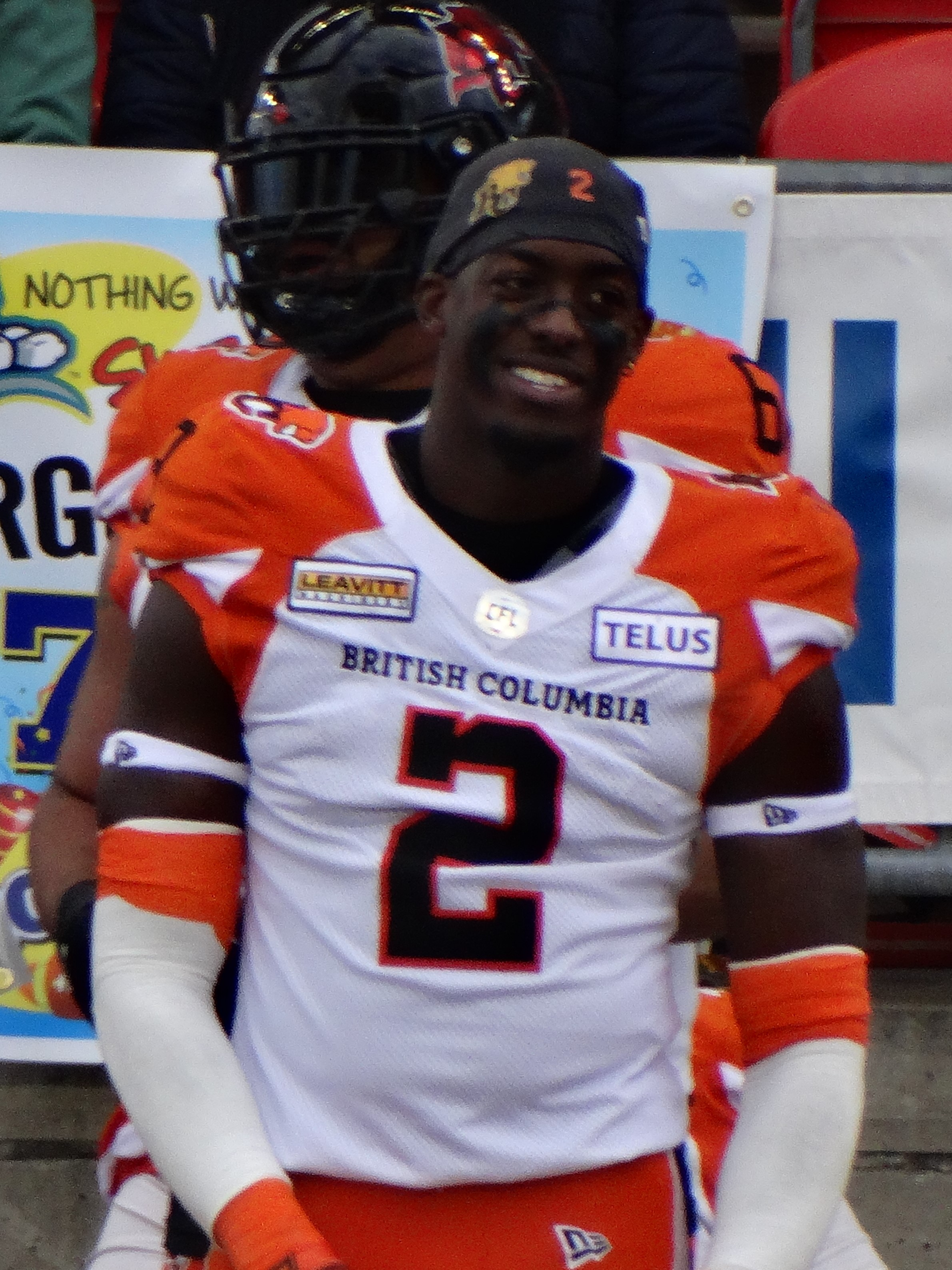
- Francis with the BC Lions in 2022

Profile
- Position: Linebacker

Personal information
- Born: June 5, 1993 (age 33); Toronto, Ontario, Canada
- Listed height: 6 ft 6 in (1.98 m)
- Listed weight: 239 lb (108 kg)

Career information
- High school: James Madison (Brooklyn, New York, U.S.)
- College: North Carolina A&T
- CFL draft: 2016

Career history
- 2016–2018: Saskatchewan Roughriders
- 2019: Ottawa Redblacks
- 2020: BC Lions*
- 2021: Saskatchewan Roughriders
- 2022: BC Lions
- 2023: Edmonton Elks*
- 2023: Ottawa Redblacks
- * Offseason or practice squad member only
- Stats at CFL.ca

Kevin Francis (born June 5, 1993) is a Canadian professional football linebacker. He played as a tight end during his college football career with the North Carolina A&T Aggies. Francis has been a member of the Saskatchewan Roughriders, Ottawa Redblacks, BC Lions, and Edmonton Elks.

== Professional career ==
=== Saskatchewan Roughriders (first stint) ===
After going undrafted in the 2016 NFL draft, Francis declared eligible for the 2016 CFL Supplemental Draft after informing the league that he was born in Toronto, Ontario. He was drafted by the Roughriders on May 25, 2016, who forfeited a third round selection in the 2017 CFL draft to acquire his rights. Upon entering 2016 training camp, Francis switched to the defensive side of the ball after previously playing on offence in college. He made his CFL debut on June 30, 2016, against the Toronto Argonauts, registering his first defensive tackle. He made his first career start at linebacker on October 22, 2016, against the Montreal Alouettes. Francis finished his rookie season having played in all 18 regular season games where he recorded 12 defensive tackles, 13 special teams tackles, and one forced fumble.

In 2017, Francis played in 15 regular season games where he had three defensive tackles, 10 special teams tackles, and one forced fumble. He suffered a shoulder injury in October and was on the injured list for the last three regular season games and both post-season games. To begin the 2018 season, he was placed on the injured list as he rehabbed his injury from 2017. He then played in the remaining 12 games of the regular season where he had six special teams tackles. He also made his post-season debut where he played in the West Final loss to the Winnipeg Blue Bombers. He became a free agent in 2019.

=== Ottawa Redblacks (first stint) ===
On February 14, 2019, Francis signed with the Ottawa Redblacks to a one-year contract. He played in just seven regular season games, but recorded eight special teams tackles.

=== BC Lions (first stint) ===
Francis again entered free agency and signed a one-year deal with the BC Lions on February 11, 2020. However, the 2020 CFL season was cancelled and Francis never played for the Lions.

=== Saskatchewan Roughriders (second stint) ===
On February 12, 2021, it was announced that Francis had re-signed with the Roughriders.

=== BC Lions (second stint) ===
Francis signed again with the Lions on February 9, 2022. Francis played in all 18 regular season games for the Lions in 2022, contributing mostly on special teams where he had 22 tackles (the most in the league).

=== Edmonton Elks ===
Francis joined the Edmonton Elks as a free agent on February 14, 2023. The contract was reportedly a one-year contract worth $122,000 in hard money and included a $25,000 signing bonus. On March 15, 2023, Francis took to social media to voice his displeasure with the terms of the contract, and requested to be traded or released from the Edmonton Elks just one month after signing with the team. Head coach Chris Jones stated in an interview that he was hopeful the situation could be resolved and Francis would be a valuable member of the team in the coming season. On May 14, 2023, Francis was placed on the team's suspended list after failing to report to training camp.

=== Ottawa Redblacks (second stint) ===
On July 4, 2023, Francis was traded to the Ottawa Redblacks in exchange for a fourth-round pick in the 2024 CFL draft. He became a free agent after the 2023 season.
