= Kacy Rodgers =

American football player and coach (born 1969)

Detroit Lions
- Title: Defensive line coach

Personal information
- Born: June 24, 1969 (age 57); Humboldt, Tennessee, U.S.

Career information
- Positions: Linebacker, defensive end
- High school: Humboldt
- College: Tennessee
- NFL draft: 1992: undrafted

Career history

Playing
- Pittsburgh Steelers (1992)*; Shreveport Pirates (1994)*
- * Offseason or practice squad member only

Coaching
- Tennessee-Martin (1994–1996) Defensive line coach; Tennessee-Martin (1997) Assistant head coach & defensive line coach; Northeast Louisiana (1998) Defensive line coach; Middle Tennessee State (1999) Defensive line coach; Middle Tennessee State (2000–2001) Assistant head coach & defensive line coach; Arkansas (2002) Defensive line coach; Dallas Cowboys (2003–2004) Defensive tackles coach; Dallas Cowboys (2005–2007) Defensive line coach; Miami Dolphins (2008–2014) Defensive line coach; New York Jets (2015–2018) Defensive coordinator; Tampa Bay Buccaneers (2019–2021) Defensive line coach; Tampa Bay Buccaneers (2022–2024) Defensive line coach & run game coordinator; Detroit Lions (2025–present) Defensive line coach & run game coordinator

Awards and highlights
- Super Bowl champion (LV)
- Coaching profile at Pro Football Reference

Kacy Rodgers (born June 24, 1969) is an American football coach who currently serves as the run game coordinator and defensive line coach for the Detroit Lions of the National Football League (NFL). He played college football for the University of Tennessee and was a part of the Pittsburgh Steelers practice squad in the NFL in 1992. Since then, Rodgers has served as an assistant coach at the college and professional levels.

== Early life ==
Rodgers played high school football for and graduated from Humboldt High School in Humboldt, Tennessee. He and wife, Marcella Cruze, have one son, Kacy II, a former professional football player for the New York Jets and current Real Estate mogul.

== College career ==
Rodgers then attended the University of Tennessee, where he was a four-year letterman for the Tennessee Volunteers football team from 1988 to 1991. He was an honorable mention All-SEC selection. During his time as a linebacker and defensive end, he won two SEC championships and played in the 1990 Cotton Bowl Classic, 1991 Sugar Bowl and the 1992 Fiesta Bowl.

== Professional playing career ==
Rodgers signed with the Pittsburgh Steelers as an undrafted free agent in 1992. He played for the Shreveport Pirates of the Canadian Football League in 1994.

== Coaching career ==
=== University of Tennessee at Martin ===
Rodgers began his coaching career in 1994 as defensive line coach for the University of Tennessee at Martin. He held the title for three seasons before adding the title of assistant head coach in 1997.

=== Northeast Louisiana ===
After his time at Tennessee-Martin, Rodgers served one season as defensive line coach for the Northeast Louisiana University in 1998.

=== Middle Tennessee State ===
In 1999, Rodgers became defensive line coach at Middle Tennessee State University. He held the title for three seasons and was also the assistant head coach for the final two. In 2001, the Blue Raiders posted an 8–3 record and were co-champions of the Sun Belt Conference. Also that season, the team tied for first in the conference with 27 sacks.

=== Arkansas ===
Rodgers then served one season as defensive line coach for the University of Arkansas in 2002. The Razorbacks defense ranked second in the SEC and 18th in the nation, going 9–5 and earning an SEC Championship berth.

=== Dallas Cowboys ===
In 2003, Arkansas alum and Dallas Cowboys owner Jerry Jones hired Rodgers as the team's defensive tackles coach. He held the title for two seasons before serving the next three as defensive line coach. Defensive tackle La'Roi Glover earned three Pro Bowl selections under Rodgers' tutelage from 2003 to 2005. The Cowboys' defense also ranked in the top 10 in the NFL during four of Rodgers' five seasons with the team. During his final season in 2007, they ranked No. 6 in the NFL and allowed just 94.6 rushing yards per game.

=== Miami Dolphins ===
In 2008, Rodgers joined the Miami Dolphins as defensive line coach under first-year head coach Tony Sparano, replacing Travis Jones and Diron Reynolds from 2007. He would churn out three pro bowlers in Randy Starks DT, Paul Soliai DT and Cameron Wake DE while with the Dolphins. Rodgers had previously worked with Sparano in Dallas the previous five seasons while also serving under former Dolphins Vice President Bill Parcells during his tenure as Cowboys head coach from 2003 to 2006.

=== New York Jets ===
Rodgers was named the New York Jets' defensive coordinator on January 23, 2015.

=== Tampa Bay Buccaneers ===
In 2019, Rodgers was named defensive line coach of the Tampa Bay Buccaneers, a position he held for three seasons. He was part of the coaching staff when the Buccaneers won Super Bowl LV. After the 2021 season, following Bruce Arians’ resignation and the promotion of defensive coordinator Todd Bowles to head coach, Rodgers was named run game coordinator for the Buccaneers. As Bowles retained his defensive play calling and coaching duties, he did not hire an official defensive coordinator, leaving Rodgers as one of two top defensive assistant coaches for Tampa Bay, along with pass game coordinator Larry Foote.

=== Detroit Lions ===
On January 23, 2025, Rodgers was hired to serve as the defensive line coach for the Detroit Lions.
