= Dariusz Bladek =

American gridiron football player (born 1994)

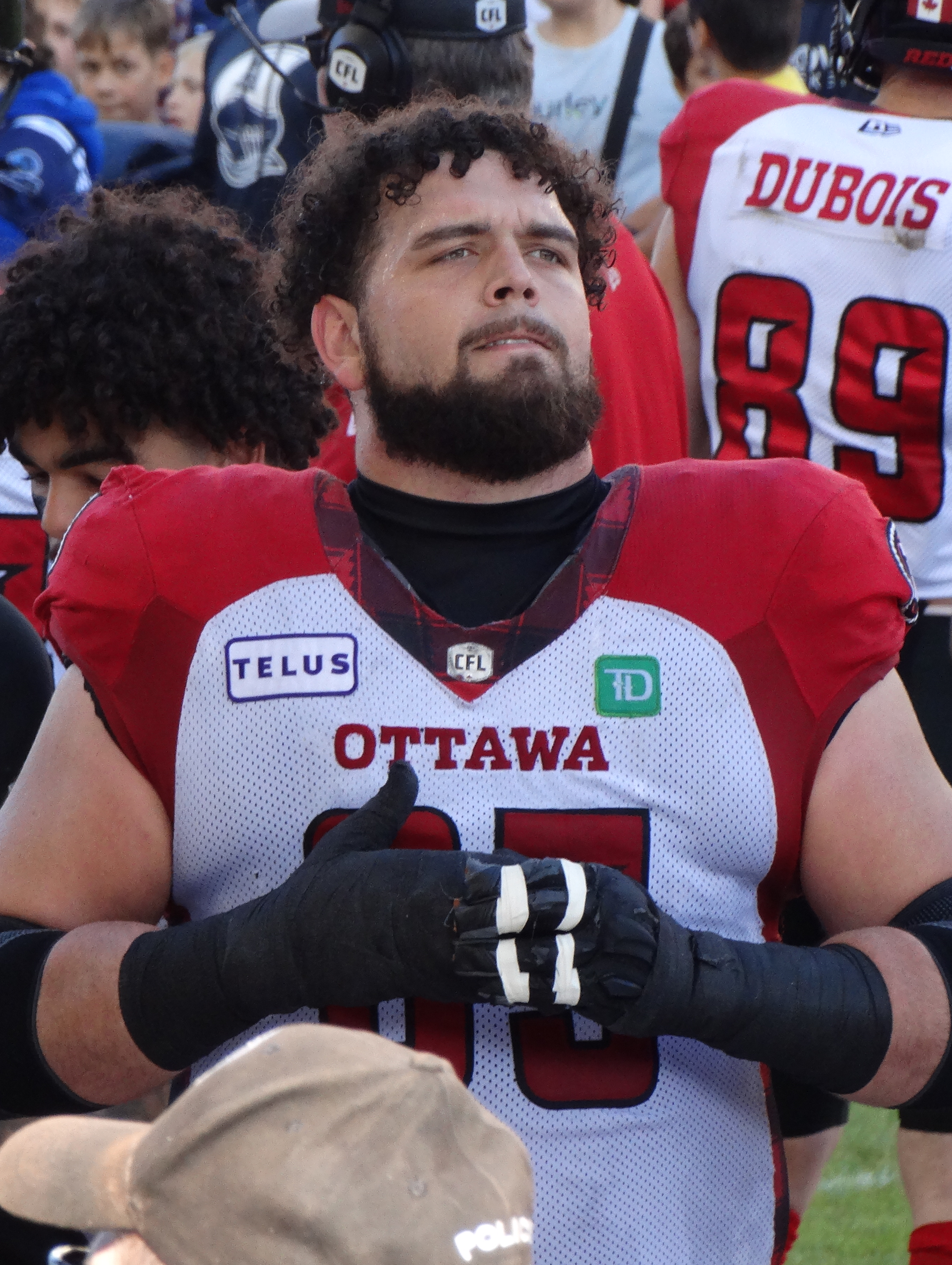
- Bladek with the Ottawa Redblacks in 2024

Profile
- Position: Offensive lineman

Personal information
- Born: April 1, 1994 (age 32); Clifton, New Jersey, U.S.
- Listed height: 6 ft 4 in (1.93 m)
- Listed weight: 303 lb (137 kg)

Career information
- High school: Poinciana High School
- College: Bethune-Cookman
- CFL draft: 2017: 2nd round, 11th overall pick

Career history
- Saskatchewan Roughriders (2017–2019); Toronto Argonauts (2020–2023); Ottawa Redblacks (2024–2025)

Awards and highlights
- Grey Cup champion (2022)
- Stats at CFL.ca

Dariusz Bladek (born April 1, 1994) is a Canadian-American professional football offensive lineman. He is a Grey Cup champion after winning with the Toronto Argonauts in 2022.

== Early life ==
Bladek was born in Clifton, New Jersey, to his Canadian mother, Joyce, and Polish father, Bogdan. He grew up in New Jersey and his family moved to Kissimmee, Florida, where he attended Poinciana High School.

== College career ==
Bladek played college football for the Bethune-Cookman Wildcats from 2012 to 2015.

== Professional career ==
=== Pre-draft ===
Pre-draft measurables
Height	Weight	Arm length	Hand span	Wingspan	40-yard dash	10-yard split	20-yard split	20-yard shuttle	Three-cone drill	Vertical jump	Broad jump	Bench press
6 ft 4 3/8 in (1.94 m)	299 lb (136 kg)	32 1/8 in (0.82 m)	10 1/4 in (0.26 m)	6 ft 6 7/8 in (2.00 m)	5.53 s	1.95 s	3.22 s	4.85 s	8.02 s	25.0 in (0.64 m)	8 ft 5 in (2.57 m)	21 reps
All values from CFL Combine/Pro Day

After completing his third year of college eligibility in 2015, Bladek declared for the 2016 NFL draft. After going unselected, he attended mini-camp with the Baltimore Ravens, but was not signed to a contract. Through a conversation with the Calgary Stampeders, he learned that he could qualify as a National player because his mother was a Canadian citizen. Due to the length of time that was required to apply for a Canadian passport, he had to bypass the 2016 CFL draft and was eligible for the 2017 CFL draft.

=== Saskatchewan Roughriders ===
Bladek was drafted by the Saskatchewan Roughriders in the second round, 11th overall, in the 2017 CFL draft and signed with the club on May 26, 2017. He made the team out of training camp and dressed in all 18 regular season games and two post-season games in his rookie year. His first professional game was on June 22, 2017, against the Montreal Alouettes. In the 2018 season, he earned his first career start, also against the Alouettes, on June 30, 2018. He played in 16 regular season games in 2018 and 11 games in 2019.

=== Toronto Argonauts ===
Upon becoming a free agent, Bladek signed a contract with the Toronto Argonauts on February 11, 2020. He signed a contract extension with the Argonauts on December 28, 2020. In 2021, he played and started in 10 regular season games for the team and also started in the team's East Final loss to the Hamilton Tiger-Cats that year.

In the 2022 season, Bladek played and started in 17 regular season games and both post-season games, including the team's victory in the 109th Grey Cup, which was his first Grey Cup in. He suffered an ankle injury in 2023, which caused him to miss the beginning of the season, but remained a healthy scratch to finish the year as the team finished with a 16–2 record. As a pending free agent, Bladek was released on January 18, 2024.

=== Ottawa Redblacks ===
On January 31, 2024, it was announced that Bladek had signed with the Ottawa Redblacks. On April 20, 2026, he was released by the Redblacks.
