= Shakir Bell =

American gridiron football player (born 1992)

No. 33
- Position: Running back

Personal information
- Born: April 10, 1992 (age 34); Indianapolis, Indiana, U.S.
- Listed height: 5 ft 7 in (1.70 m)
- Listed weight: 185 lb (84 kg)

Career information
- High school: Warren Central (Indianapolis)
- College: Indiana State (2010–2013)
- NFL draft: 2014: undrafted

Career history
- 2015–2016: Edmonton Eskimos
- 2017: Ottawa Redblacks*
- 2017: Saskatchewan Roughriders
- * Offseason or practice squad member only

Awards and highlights
- Grey Cup champion (2015); First-team All-American (2011); First-team All-MVFC (2011)
- Stats at CFL.ca

Shakir Bell (born April 10, 1992) is an American former professional football running back who played for the Edmonton Eskimos of the Canadian Football League (CFL). He played college football for the Indiana State Sycamores.

== Early life ==
Bell lettered in football and track at Warren Central High School in Indianapolis, Indiana. He was an all-conference, all-state and Parade all-American selection. In his senior season (2009), he recorded 3,105 rushing yards and 38 touchdowns in leading the Warriors to a State Championship and a record of 13–2 (.867) The Warriors had a record of 45–10 (.818) for his HS career, including a 17–2 (.895) playoff record. He was selected one of the top 50 players in the state by the IFCA; setting a Class 5A record with 3,105 rushing yards. He was also the second leading rusher in the nation.

== College career ==
Bell played for the Indiana State Sycamores from 2010 to 2013. He finished his career as the second leading running back in Indiana State history (4,214); gaining 1,450+ yards in back-to-back seasons, one of two Sycamores all-time with two 1,000-yard seasons and the school's single-season rushing record holder with 1,670 yards in 2011. He set the school record for rushing yards per game with 256. He ranks second in school history with 4,214 career rushing yards, fourth all-time in 672 career rushes and tied for second with 28 career rushing touchdowns; one of two Sycamores with 25+ rushing touchdowns in 106 seasons of football. He rushed for 100+ yards 21 times in his career (15x 100+ yards, 5x 200+ yards) including the only 300+ yard game in Sycamore history (a 27–10 victory over the Drake Bulldogs in 2012) He was a consensus first team All-American in 2011, leading the nation in rushing (1,670 yards); this total was the 8th best performance in league history He was the runner-up for the Payton Award in 2011 as well as the MVFC Offensive MVP.

== Professional career ==
=== Edmonton Eskimos ===
==== 2015 ====
Bell signed with the Edmonton Eskimos of the Canadian Football League (CFL) on April 29, 2015. In his first game in the league Bell carried the ball 18 times for 144 yards averaging 8.0 yards per carry. He followed up with an impressive showing vs. Winnipeg in Week 5. Bell finished the season with 633 yards on 113 rushing attempts (5.6 average) with one touchdown. He added 264 receiving yards on 26 receptions and no touchdowns.

==== 2016 ====
Bell opened the season as the Eskimos second running back on the depth chart, behind starter Jon White. Following an injury to White, Bell became the starter in late August. In his first game as the starter Bell was named CFL Player of the Week following the Eskimos' victory over the Saskatchewan Roughriders. Bell recorded 18 carries for 138 yards and added four receptions for 32 yards and one touchdown (170 yards all-purpose). Bell became the first Eskimos running back with at least 20 carries in a game since Hugh Charles did it in July 2012. Bell suffered an injury in practice in late September, which would cause him to miss all but the last game of the season. Bell finished the season with 68 carries for 425 yards and 1 rushing touchdown in only 4 games.

Set to become a free agent in February 2017 Bell had a workout with the New England Patriots (NFL) on December 14, 2016. Bell was not resigned by the Eskimos prior to February 14 and thus became a free agent.

=== Ottawa Redblacks ===
Bell signed with the Ottawa Redblacks (CFL) in early May 2017. After fumbling twice in the Redblacks second pre-season game Bell was released by the team as they trimmed their roster down for the start of the season.

=== Saskatchewan Roughriders ===
Bell signed with the Saskatchewan Roughriders on November 1, 2017. However, he was placed on the injured list on November 3 and never dressed in a game for the Roughriders. On February 1, 2018, he was released by the Roughriders, along with running back Kienan LaFrance.

== Personal life ==
Bell moved to Edmonton full-time after the 2015 season. He has one daughter, born in 2013.
