= Alexandre Gagné =

Canadian gridiron football player (born 1992)

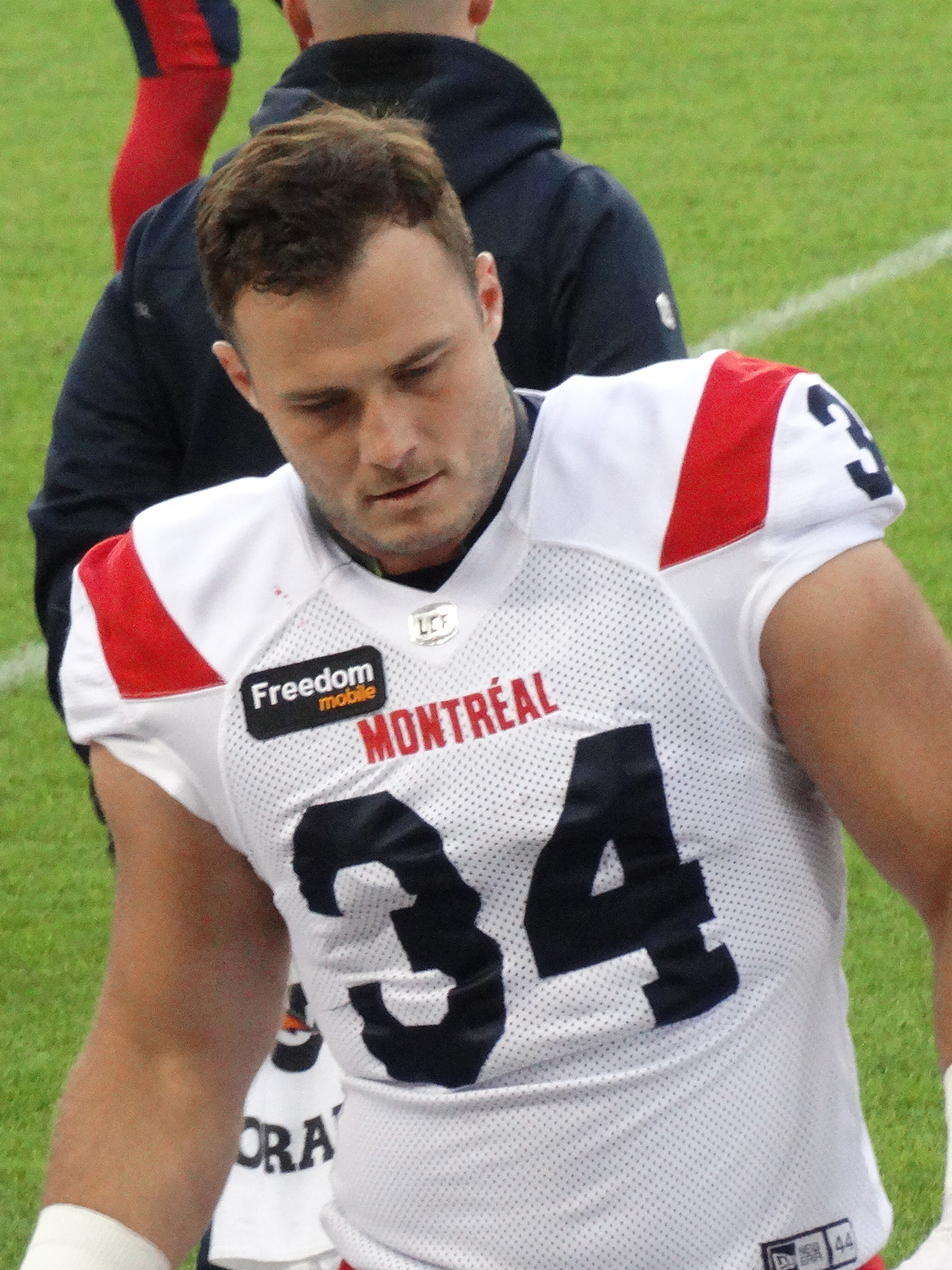
- Gagné with the Montreal Alouettes in 2024

No. 34 – Montreal Alouettes
- Position: Linebacker
- Roster status: Active
- CFL status: National

Personal information
- Born: January 29, 1992 (age 34); St. Hubert, Quebec, Canada
- Listed height: 6 ft 1 in (1.85 m)
- Listed weight: 230 lb (104 kg)

Career information
- University: Sherbrooke Vert et Or
- CFL draft: 2016: undrafted

Career history
- Saskatchewan Roughriders (2017–2019); Montreal Alouettes (2020–present)

Awards and highlights
- Grey Cup champion (2023); Second-team All-Canadian (2016)
- Stats at CFL.ca

Alexandre Gagné (born January 29, 1992) is a Canadian professional football linebacker for the Montreal Alouettes of the Canadian Football League (CFL).

== University career ==
Gagné played U Sports football with the Sherbrooke Vert et Or.

== Professional career ==
=== Saskatchewan Roughriders ===
Gagné was not selected in the 2016 CFL draft and returned to play his final year of eligibility at Sherbrooke in 2016. He later attended a tryout camp held by the Saskatchewan Roughriders in 2017 and was signed by the team as an undrafted free agent on April 25, 2017. He began the season on the practice roster and was promoted to the active roster to play in his first professional football game on September 9, 2017 against the Winnipeg Blue Bombers in the Banjo Bowl.

For the 2018 season, Gagné sat out the season opener, but played in the remaining 17 regular season games as he finished third in the league with 23 special teams tackles. He also played in his first post-season game in the West Semi-Final loss to the Blue Bombers that year. In 2019, he played in all 18 regular season games and had 19 special teams tackles. He became a free agent during the following off-season.

=== Montreal Alouettes ===
Gagné signed with the Montreal Alouettes on February 12, 2020. However, he did not play in 2020 as the 2020 CFL season was cancelled. In 2021, Gagné played in all 14 regular season games where he had 18 special teams tackles and one forced fumble. In the following season, he played in 18 regular season games where he had 15 special teams tackles.
