= Glenn Love =

American gridiron football player (born 1989)

No. 58, 36, 31, 34
- Position: Linebacker

Personal information
- Born: June 8, 1989 (age 37); Champaign, Illinois, U.S.
- Listed height: 6 ft 4 in (1.93 m)
- Listed weight: 225 lb (102 kg)

Career information
- High school: Chandler (AZ) Hamilton
- College: UCLA

Career history
- 2012: BC Lions
- 2013–2016: Calgary Stampeders
- 2017: Saskatchewan Roughriders
- 2018–2019: Montreal Alouettes

Awards and highlights
- Grey Cup champion (2014)
- Stats at CFL.ca

Glenn Allen Love Jr. (born June 8, 1989) is an American former professional football linebacker who played in the Canadian Football League (CFL) for the BC Lions, Calgary Stampeders, Saskatchewan Roughriders, and Montreal Alouettes. He played college football at the University of California, Los Angeles.

== Early life ==
Love played high school football at Hamilton High School in Chandler, Arizona. He was named first-team all-state and all-region in 2006 after recording more than 100 tackles and a school-record 10 interceptions. He also lettered in soccer, basketball, and track.

== College career ==
Love played for the UCLA Bruins from 2008 to 2011. He did not see action in 2007 due to injuries and was redshirted. He played in all 12 games in 2008, totaling 17 solo tackles, six assisted tackles, and one forced fumble. He played in all 13 games in 2009, accumulating 14 solo tackles and 13 assisted tackles. Love appeared in all 12 games again in 2010, recording 14 solo tackles, two assisted tackles, one sack, and two pass breakups. He played in 11 games, starting six at linebacker, his senior year in 2011, totaling 23 solo tackles, 16 assisted tackles, one sack, and one forced fumble. Love began his college career as a safety before converting to linebacker over his last two seasons. He was mostly a special teams player and backup during his college career.

== Professional career ==
Love signed with the CFL's BC Lions on June 24, 2012. He made his CFL debut on August 6, 2012 against the Toronto Argonauts. He was released by the Lions on June 23, 2013.

Love was signed by the Calgary Stampeders of the CFL on August 28, 2013. He was named CFL Special Teams Player of the Week for Week 19 of the 2014 CFL season. He dressed in 43 games, starting eight, for the Stampeders from 2013 to 2016.

Love dressed in 11 games for the Saskatchewan Roughriders in 2017.

He dressed in 15 games, starting seven, for the Montreal Alouettes from 2018 to 2019.

== Personal life ==
In January 2025, it was announced Love had been diagnosed with amyotrophic lateral sclerosis.
