= Zach Minter =

American gridiron football player (born 1990)

No. 96
- Position: Defensive tackle

Personal information
- Born: November 6, 1990 (age 36); Glendale, Arizona, U.S.
- Listed height: 6 ft 2 in (1.88 m)
- Listed weight: 307 lb (139 kg)

Career information
- College: Montana State
- NFL draft: 2013: undrafted

Career history
- Chicago Bears (2013); Cincinnati Bengals (2014); Dallas Cowboys (2014); BC Lions (2015); Calgary Stampeders (2016); Saskatchewan Roughriders (2017)

Career NFL statistics
- Games played: 2
- Stats at Pro Football Reference
- Stats at CFL.ca

Zach Minter (born November 6, 1990) is an American former professional gridiron football defensive tackle. He was signed by the Chicago Bears of the National Football League (NFL) as an undrafted free agent in 2013. He played college football for the Montana State Bobcats. He has also been a member of the Dallas Cowboys and Cincinnati Bengals of the NFL and the BC Lions, Calgary Stampeders, and Saskatchewan Roughriders of the Canadian Football League (CFL).

== Early life ==
He went to Cactus High School. He attended Montana State University. He was selected to the All-West Valley Region, and first-team All-State team. He also was selected to the West Valley Defensive Player of the Year.

== Professional career ==
=== Chicago Bears ===
On April 27, 2013, he signed with the Chicago Bears as an undrafted free agent. Minter made his NFL debut in week six against the New York Giants. On November 5, Minter was waived.

=== Cincinnati Bengals ===
Minter signed a reserve/future contract with the Cincinnati Bengals on January 6, 2014. He was waived on August 8.

=== Dallas Cowboys ===
Minter signed with the Dallas Cowboys on August 14, 2014.

=== BC Lions ===
On March 2, 2015, Minter signed with the BC Lions of the Canadian Football League.

=== Calgary Stampeders ===
In July 2016, Minter signed with the Calgary Stampeders.

=== Saskatchewan Roughriders ===
Minter signed with the Saskatchewan Roughriders on February 21, 2017.
