= Cameron Ontko =

American football player (1992–2026)

Cameron Ontko (March 23, 1992 – March 7, 2026) was an American professional football player in the Canadian Football League (CFL). He played college football for the Wisconsin Badgers and Cal Poly Mustangs.

== Biography ==
Ontko was born in Cleveland, Ohio, on March 23, 1992. He began his college career at the University of Wisconsin–Madison with the Badgers before transferring to California Polytechnic State University, San Luis Obispo, where he played for the Mustangs.

He played for the BC Lions in the CFL (2015–2017). Prior to joining the CFL, he participated in the tryout camp for the Tampa Bay Buccaneers.

Ontko died on March 7, 2026, at the age of 33, as the result of a ruptured ulcer.
