= Thaddeus Coleman =

American gridiron football player (born 1985)

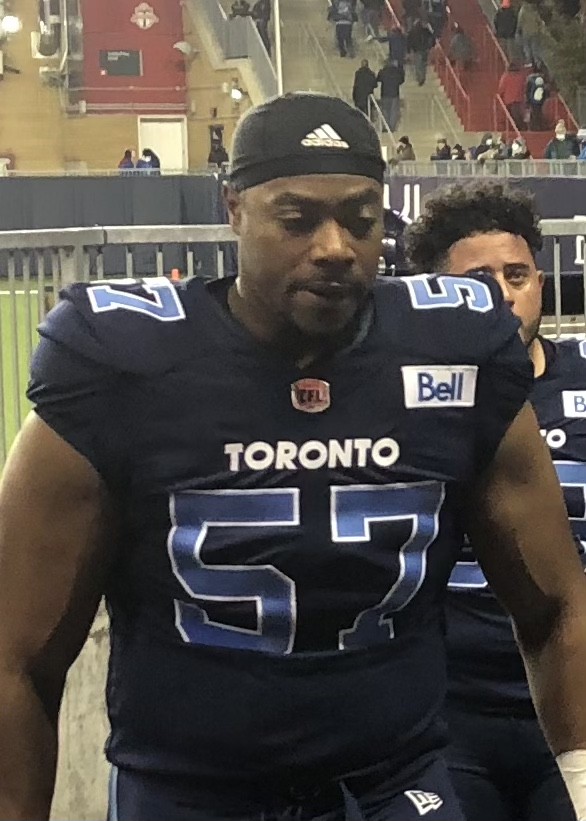
- Coleman with the Toronto Argonauts in 2021

No. 72, 68, 57
- Position: Offensive tackle

Personal information
- Born: June 20, 1985 (age 41); Waukegan, Illinois, U.S.
- Listed height: 6 ft 8 in (2.03 m)
- Listed weight: 308 lb (140 kg)

Career information
- High school: North Chicago (North Chicago, Illinois)
- College: Mississippi Valley State
- NFL draft: 2008: undrafted

Career history
- Arizona Cardinals (2008)*; New York Jets (2008)*; Edmonton Eskimos (2008)*; RiverCity Rage (2009); Winnipeg Blue Bombers (2009)*; Chicago Rush (2010); Orlando Predators (2011–2013); Virginia Destroyers (2011)*; New Orleans VooDoo (2013); Edmonton Eskimos (2013–2015); Saskatchewan Roughriders (2016–2019); Edmonton Elks (2021)*; Toronto Argonauts (2021)
- * Offseason or practice squad member only

Awards and highlights
- Grey Cup champion (2015); 2× First-team All-SWAC (2006–2007)

Career AFL statistics
- Receptions: 1
- Receiving yards: 13
- Tackles: 3.5
- Fumble recoveries: 1
- Stats at ArenaFan.com
- Stats at CFL.ca

Thaddeus Coleman (born June 20, 1985) is an American former professional football player who was an offensive tackle in the Canadian Football League (CFL) and Arena Football League (AFL). He played college football at Mississippi Valley State, where he was a two-time first-team All-Southwestern Athletic Conference selection. He was signed by the Arizona Cardinals of the National Football League (NFL) as an undrafted free agent in 2008. Coleman was also a member of the New York Jets of the NFL; Edmonton Eskimos, Winnipeg Blue Bombers, Saskatchewan Roughriders, and Toronto Argonauts of the CFL; Chicago Rush, Orlando Predators, New Orleans VooDoo, and San Jose SaberCats of the AFL; Virginia Destroyers of the United Football League (UFL); and the RiverCity Rage of the Indoor Football League (IFL). He won the 103rd Grey Cup with the Eskimos.

== Early life ==
Coleman was born on June 20, 1985, in Waukegan, Illinois. He played high school football at North Chicago Community High School in North Chicago, Illinois, as a two-way lineman. He helped North Chicago make the playoffs in 2001 and 2002. Coleman also played basketball in high school.

== College career ==
Coleman played college football for the Mississippi Valley State Delta Devils of Mississippi Valley State University from 2004 to 2007. He spent his first season in 2004 as a tight end and started three games but did not record a reception. He moved to offensive tackle in 2005 and appeared in six games that season as a backup at both right tackle and left tackle. Coleman became a starter at left tackle in 2007 and was named first-team All-Southwestern Athletic Conference (SWAC). He was named first-team All-SWAC his senior year as well and played in a postseason all-star game after the season.

== Professional career ==
After going unselected in the 2008 NFL draft, Coleman signed with the Arizona Cardinals of the National Football League (NFL) on April 28, 2008. He was released on July 31, 2008.

Coleman was signed by the New York Jets of the NFL on August 9, 2008, and was released on August 26, 2008, prior to the start of the 2008 NFL season.

Coleman was signed to the practice roster of the Edmonton Eskimos of the Canadian Football League (CFL) on September 16, 2008. He played in three games for the RiverCity Rage of the Indoor Football League in 2009 and made one solo tackle.

On June 15, 2009, the Eskimos traded Coleman to the Winnipeg Blue Bombers for Willie Amos. He was released on June 25 but signed to the team's practice roster on June 30 before the start of the 2009 CFL season. He was released from the practice roster on July 14, 2009.

Coleman was assigned to the Chicago Rush of the Arena Football League (AFL) on March 10, 2010. He was placed on the suspended list on May 5, and was traded to the Oklahoma City Yard Dawgz for Quartez Vickerson on May 31. However, the trade was voided on June 4. Coleman was placed on injured reserve on June 16, 2010. He recorded one assisted tackle during the 2010 season.

Coleman was assigned to the Orlando Predators of the AFL on November 22, 2010. He caught one pass for 13 yards during the 2011 season. He was placed on the exempt list on July 6, 2011, activated on July 21, and placed on the exempt list again on August 4 after signing with the Virginia Destroyers of the United Football League (UFL). Coleman was released by the Destroyers on September 8 before the start of the 2011 UFL season. He was reassigned to the Predators on September 30, 2011. He was placed on injured reserve on May 14, 2012, and activated on June 4. He recorded one solo tackle and one fumble recovery in 2012. He was assigned to the Predators again on November 19, 2012. Coleman posted one assisted tackle for the Predators in 2013. He was placed on reassignment on April 16, 2013, but was activated the next day.

On April 18, 2013, Coleman was traded to the New Orleans VooDoo for defensive lineman Prentice Purnell. Coleman totaled one solo tackle and one assisted tackle for the VooDoo in 2013. He was placed on the exempt list on June 3, 2013, after signing with the Eskimos. Even though Coleman was still a member of the Eskimos, the VooDoo activated him on June 23, 2015. He was placed on the refused to report list the next day. Nonetheless, he was activated again on June 25, 2015.

Coleman signed with the Eskimos on June 5, 2013. He started all 18 games for the Eskimos during the 2013 season, recording two fumble recoveries and one tackle. He started the first two games of the 2014 season but suffered a hyper-extended elbow in the second game, causing him to miss the rest of the regular season. He later returned from injury to start both the 2014 West Division semifinal and final. Coleman was moved to the practice roster on June 21, 2015, prior to the start of the 2015 CFL season. He was promoted to the active roster on August 27, and played in his only game of the 2015 season on August 28, a start in place of the injured Tony Washington. Coleman was moved back to the practice roster on September 10, and was later transferred to the injured list on October 31, where he spent the remainder of the season. The Eskimos later won the 103rd Grey Cup against the Ottawa Redblacks on November 29, 2015.

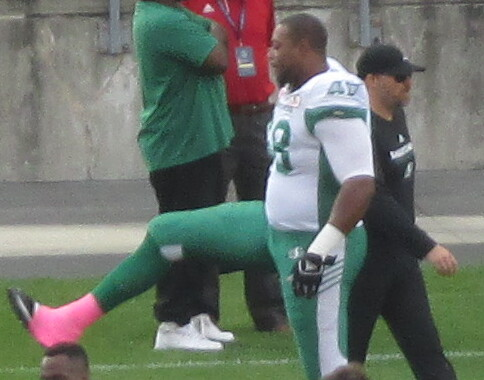
Coleman with the Saskatchewan Roughriders in 2017

On October 16, 2015, Coleman was assigned to the San Jose SaberCats of the AFL during the AFL's offseason assignment process, despite still being a member of the Eskimos.

On May 2, 2016, the Eskimos traded Coleman to the Saskatchewan Roughriders for "two undisclosed players off the Roughriders' negotiation list". Coleman started all 18 games for the Roughriders in 2016 and also made one tackle. He started all 18 games in 2017 as well, totaling one fumble recovery and one tackle. He also started the 2017 East Division semifinal and final. In December 2017, Coleman signed a two-year contract extension with the Roughriders. He started all 18 regular season games for the third consecutive season in 2018 and made one tackle. Coleman also started the 2018 West Division semifinal. He started 17 games for the team in 2019, posting one tackle. He became a free agent after the 2019 season but the 2020 CFL season was later cancelled due to the COVID-19 pandemic.

Coleman signed with the newly renamed Edmonton Elks on July 11, 2021, and was moved to the team's suspended list the same day until he "completed CFL COVID-19 protocols". He was activated from the suspended list on July 19. He was released on July 29, 2021, before the start of the 2021 CFL season.

Coleman signed with the Toronto Argonauts of the CFL on November 9, 2021. He was moved to the practice roster on November 14. On November 15, he was promoted to the active roster in order to start the team's regular season finale. He was moved back to the practice roster on November 25, and was released on December 5, 2021.

== Personal life ==
Coleman's father, Michael Coleman, was also a football player. As of 2024, Thaddeus was serving as an animal control peace officer with the city of Edmonton.
