= Alexandre Chevrier =

Canadian football player (born 1992)

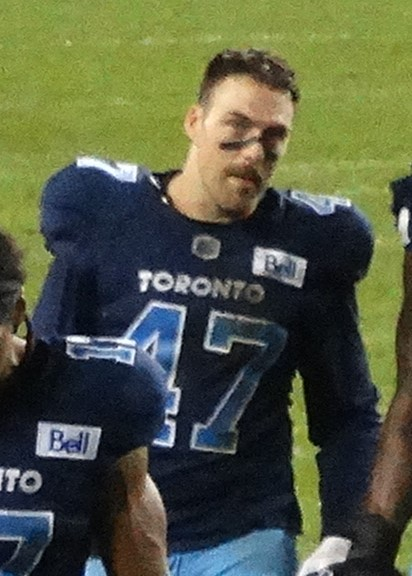
- Chevrier with the Toronto Argonauts in 2021

Profile
- Position: Linebacker

Personal information
- Born: December 26, 1992 (age 33); Pointe-Claire, Quebec, Canada
- Listed height: 6 ft 0 in (1.83 m)
- Listed weight: 217 lb (98 kg)

Career information
- College: Sherbrooke
- CFL draft: 2017: 7th round, 55th overall pick

Career history
- 2017: Saskatchewan Roughriders*
- 2018–2020: Saskatchewan Roughriders
- 2021: Montreal Alouettes
- 2021: Toronto Argonauts
- * Offseason or practice squad member only
- Stats at CFL.ca

Alexandre Chevrier (born December 26, 1992) is a Canadian former professional football linebacker who played in the Canadian Football League (CFL).

== University career ==
Chevrier played U Sports football for the Sherbrooke Vert et Or from 2013 to 2017.

== Professional career ==
Pre-draft measurables
Height	Weight	40-yard dash	20-yard shuttle	Three-cone drill	Vertical jump	Broad jump	Bench press
5 ft 11 3/4 in (1.82 m)	215 lb (98 kg)	4.66 s	4.34 s	7.25 s	34.5 in (0.88 m)	9 ft 8 in (2.95 m)	14 reps
All values from CFL Combine

=== Saskatchewan Roughriders ===
Chevrier was drafted in the seventh round, 55th overall, in the 2017 CFL draft by the Saskatchewan Roughriders and was signed on May 26, 2017. He attended training camp with the team, but returned to Sherbrooke to complete his final year of college eligibility. He re-signed with the Roughriders on December 19, 2017. Chevrier made his professional debut on June 30, 2018 against the Montreal Alouettes and played in the remaining 16 regular season games that year, recording 16 special teams tackles. He played in all 18 regular season games in 2019 where he had 12 special teams tackles. He did not play in 2020 due to the cancellation of the 2020 CFL season. He became a free agent in 2021.

=== Montreal Alouettes ===
On February 10, 2021, it was announced that Chevrier had signed with the Montreal Alouettes. He played in four games with the team and recorded two special teams tackles before being released on September 14, 2021.

=== Toronto Argonauts ===
Soon after his release from Montreal, Chevrier signed with the Toronto Argonauts on September 20, 2021. He retired on May 14, 2022.
