= Crezdon Butler =

American football player (born 1987)

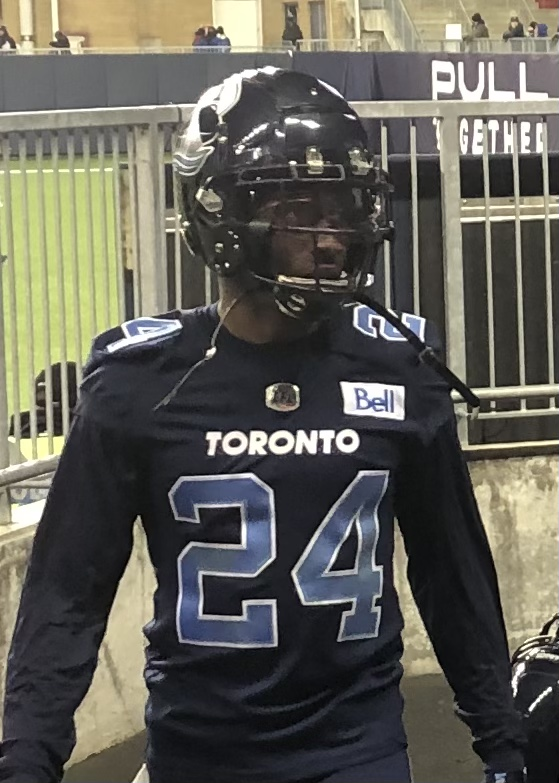
- Butler with the Toronto Argonauts in 2021

No. 28, 22, 30, 32, 29, 20, 26, 41, 17, 5, 24
- Position: Defensive back

Personal information
- Born: May 26, 1987 (age 39); Asheville, North Carolina, U.S.
- Listed height: 6 ft 1 in (1.85 m)
- Listed weight: 191 lb (87 kg)

Career information
- High school: Asheville
- College: Clemson
- NFL draft: 2010: 5th round, 164th overall pick

Career history
- Pittsburgh Steelers (2010); Arizona Cardinals (2011); Washington Redskins (2012); Arizona Cardinals (2012); Buffalo Bills (2012); San Diego Chargers (2013); Tampa Bay Buccaneers (2014); Detroit Lions (2015)*; Seattle Seahawks (2015); Detroit Lions (2015–2016); Saskatchewan Roughriders (2017–2018); Toronto Argonauts (2019); BC Lions (2019); Toronto Argonauts (2020–2021)
- * Offseason or practice squad member only

Career NFL statistics
- Total tackles: 27
- Forced fumbles: 3
- Stats at Pro Football Reference
- Stats at CFL.ca

Crezdon Butler (born May 26, 1987) is an American former professional football player who was a defensive back in the National Football League (NFL) and Canadian Football League (CFL). He played college football for the Clemson Tigers. He was selected in the fifth round, with the 164th overall pick in the 2010 NFL draft by the Pittsburgh Steelers. As a journeyman cornerback, Butler was a member of eight different NFL teams; the Steelers, Arizona Cardinals, Washington Redskins, Buffalo Bills, San Diego Chargers, Tampa Bay Buccaneers, Detroit Lions and Seattle Seahawks. He was also a member of the Saskatchewan Roughriders, Toronto Argonauts and BC Lions of the Canadian Football League (CFL).

== Early life ==
Butler was born in Asheville, North Carolina, and attended Asheville High School, where he led the Cougars to the 2005 divisional championship. Rated a four-star cornerback by recruiting services like Scout.com and Rivals.com, he chose to attend Clemson University over other schools such as the University of South Carolina, University of North Carolina, and Virginia Tech.

== College career ==
As a true freshman, Butler received playing time as a cornerback in nickel and dime packages, recording three interceptions. He was named a starter in his sophomore year, and managed to record three picks. Butler became a standout in his junior year, producing 68 tackles (three for a loss) and four interceptions, including one key interception against Nebraska in the 2009 Gator Bowl. Butler chose to return to Clemson for his senior year and earn his degree in sociology, electing to wait one more year before declaring for the NFL draft. During the course of his senior season, the fear of turning the ball over caused opponents to throw his way just 14 times in the whole season, dropping his statistical output to only one interception and 8 passes defensed. Butler finished his collegiate career with 166 tackles, two sacks, and eleven interceptions.

== Professional career ==
=== Pre-draft ===
Butler was originally projected to be a late first round selection before his senior year. After his statistically lacking season, opinions as a whole dropped negatively: some sources regarded Butler as an undrafted free agent target, while others rated him as a possible fifth round target.

Pre-draft measurables
Height	Weight	40-yard dash	10-yard split	20-yard split	20-yard shuttle	Three-cone drill	Vertical jump	Broad jump	Bench press	Wonderlic
6 ft 0 in (1.83 m)	191 lb (87 kg)	4.43 s	1.54 s	2.50 s	4.23 s	7.08 s	39.5 in (1.00 m)	10 ft 1 in (3.07 m)	17 reps	x
All values from NFL Combine

=== Pittsburgh Steelers ===
The Pittsburgh Steelers selected Butler with their fifth round selection, 164th overall, of the 2010 NFL draft. Butler was regarded as a long and athletic cornerback with good ball skills, albeit with a weak statistical senior season. He was signed to a three-year rookie contract, and was named to the 53-man roster. Although he was drafted in the fifth round only the year prior, he was waived by the Steelers on September 3, 2011.

=== Arizona Cardinals (first stint) ===
On September 4, 2011, Butler was claimed off waivers by the Arizona Cardinals. He was placed on the injured reserve list on September 20 due to a dislocated ankle. On August 31, 2012, he was waived by Arizona, being one of the final roster cuts before the start of the 2012 season.

=== Washington Redskins ===
On September 1, 2012, the Washington Redskins claimed Butler off waivers. After playing in only two games, he was waived-injured on September 25 after suffering a hamstring injury in Week 2 against the Cincinnati Bengals.

=== Arizona Cardinals (second stint) ===
The Cardinals re-signed Butler on October 9, 2012, but released him a week later. He re-signed with the Arizona Cardinals on October 23, 2012, and was assigned to the practice squad.

=== Buffalo Bills ===
On November 7, 2012, Butler was signed from the Cardinal's practice squad, joining the Buffalo Bills active roster. He dressed in five games for the Bills, recording three tackles and a forced fumble against the New York Jets in Week 17. He was released on August 30, 2013.

=== San Diego Chargers ===
He was signed by the San Diego Chargers on September 17, 2013. Butler was released on August 29, 2014.

=== Tampa Bay Buccaneers ===
The Tampa Bay Buccaneers signed Butler on September 10, 2014, to replace the injured Mike Jenkins. Butler made his first career NFL start against the Baltimore Ravens on October 12, 2014. Tampa Bay released Butler on December 16. During his time with Tampa Bay, he made three starts and recorded 14 tackles.

=== Detroit Lions (first stint) ===
The Detroit Lions signed Butler to a reserve/futures contract on January 7, 2015. Butler did not make the final 2015 roster and was cut in early September.

=== Seattle Seahawks ===
On October 13, 2015, Butler was signed by the Seattle Seahawks but was released a week later.

=== Detroit Lions (second stint) ===
On November 14, 2015, Butler re-joined the Lions, signing a one-year contract for $747,500 with a $2,500 signing bonus. This was necessitated by placing starting cornerback Rashean Mathis on injured reserve. In his first game with the Lions, against the Green Bay Packers, Butler batted down an attempted pass from Aaron Rodgers to Davante Adams during a two point conversion toward the end of the fourth quarter, preserving a two-point lead. The Lions won the game 18–16, ending a 24-year losing streak in the state of Wisconsin. He appeared in the final eight games of the season and finished with three total tackles on the year. On March 11, 2016, the Detroit Lions re-signed Butler to a one-year, $760,000 contract. On August 29, 2016, Butler was released by the Lions. He was re-signed on December 28, 2016.

=== Saskatchewan Roughriders ===
On June 7, 2017, Butler was signed by the Saskatchewan Roughriders. After the two game CFL preseason, Butler was released on June 18, but was assigned to the Roughriders' practice roster on June 25. Following the first four weeks of the season spent on the practice roster, Butler was promoted to the active game-day roster on July 22. During a 30–15 loss to the BC Lions on August 5, Butler was productive, recording 5 tackles, but gave up a touchdown after running into the goalpost in the end zone. Butler would later leave the game with an injury. As the season progressed, Butler was utilized as a blitzing cornerback in addition to his coverage duties, recording 2 sacks and a forced fumble to go along with 39 defensive tackles and 4 pass knockdowns in 15 games played for the 2017 season. During 2 playoff games played, Butler totaled 8 tackles, as well as a fumble recovery during the CFL East Championship, which saw the Roughriders lose to Toronto 25–21. During the off-season, the Roughriders extended Butler's rookie contract by a year, keeping him with the team through the end of 2019. In his second year with the Riders, Butler missed several games with injury. In 11 games, Butler made 31 tackles and 2 special teams tackles. What would have been his first professional interception was wiped out by an unrelated penalty by a teammate during a week 7 loss to Calgary on July 28, 2018. Butler made two tackles during the lone postseason game, a loss to the Winnipeg Blue Bombers. Butler was released as a part of final cuts prior to the 2019 season.

=== Toronto Argonauts (first stint) ===
Butler was signed by the Toronto Argonauts on July 3, 2019. He was released on July 10, 2019.

=== BC Lions ===
Butler was signed by the BC Lions on July 23, 2019. Butler finished the season playing 12 games and making 25 tackles. Butler also forced a fumble, and recorded his first career interception.

=== Toronto Argonauts (second stint) ===
On February 19, 2020, Butler signed as a free agent with the Argonauts. He signed a contract extension with the Argonauts on January 18, 2021. He played and started in 13 regular season games where he had 35 defensive tackles and one interception. He was released on April 27, 2022.
