= Kienan LaFrance =

Canadian gridiron football player (born 1991)

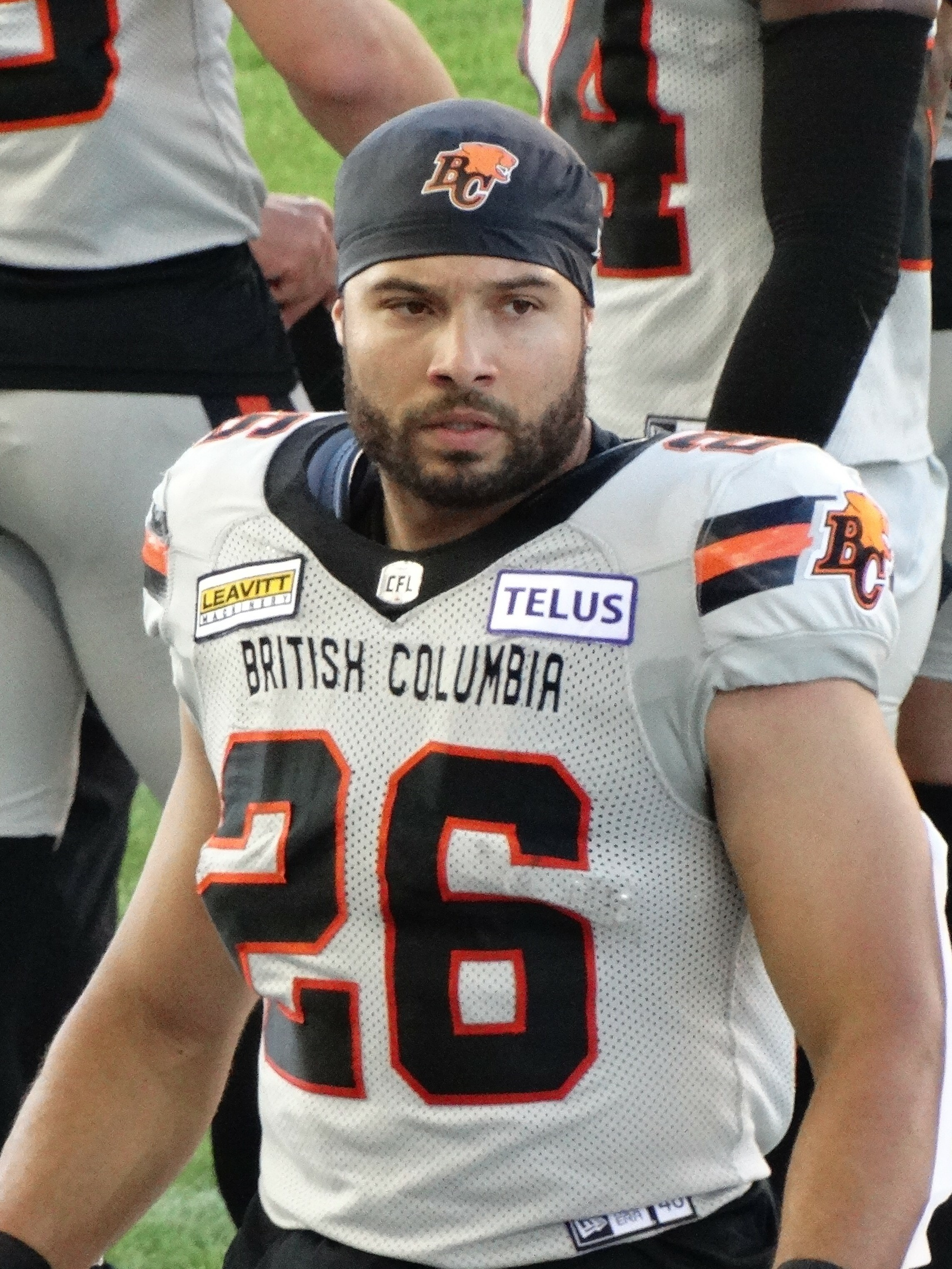
- LaFrance with the BC Lions in 2023

Manitoba Bisons
- Title: Running backs coach
- CFL status: National

Personal information
- Born: May 16, 1991 (age 35); Winnipeg, Manitoba, Canada
- Listed height: 5 ft 10 in (1.78 m)
- Listed weight: 210 lb (95 kg)

Career information
- Position: Running back (No. 27)
- University: Manitoba
- CFL draft: 2015: 6th round, 45th overall pick

Career history

Playing
- 2015–2016: Ottawa Redblacks
- 2017: Saskatchewan Roughriders
- 2018: Winnipeg Blue Bombers
- 2019–2022: Saskatchewan Roughriders
- 2023: BC Lions

Coaching
- 2024–present: Manitoba Bisons; Running backs coach

Awards and highlights
- Grey Cup champion (2016)
- Stats at CFL.ca

Kienan LaFrance (born May 16, 1991) is a Canadian former professional football running back who is currently the running backs coach for the Manitoba Bisons of U Sports football. He made his professional debut for the Ottawa Redblacks, where he won the 104th Grey Cup in 2016, and has also been a member of the Winnipeg Blue Bombers, Saskatchewan Roughriders, and BC Lions.

== Professional career ==
=== Ottawa Redblacks ===
LaFrance was drafted in the sixth round, 45th overall by the Ottawa Redblacks in the 2015 CFL draft. He was officially signed on May 25, 2015. After minimal usage his rookie season, LaFrance developed into a rotational player on offense and special teams, especially when starting running back William Powell was lost to injury.

On November 20, 2016 in the postseason, LaFrance rushed for 157 yards and scored the game-winning touchdown to send the Redblacks back to the Grey Cup for the second straight season. Ottawa went on to win the Grey Cup, with LaFrance as the game's leading rusher with 42 yards on 11 carries, and also pitching in 31 receiving yards.

=== Saskatchewan Roughriders (first stint) ===
On February 14, 2017, LaFrance signed with the Saskatchewan Roughriders (CFL). He dressed in 13 regular games and started six of them, recording 68 carries for 273 rushing yards and two touchdowns, as well as 14 catches for 119 receiving yards and one touchdown. He was released by the team on February 1, 2018 the day before the Roughriders were to pay LaFrance a $20,000 bonus as part of the final year of his contract; the original 2-year deal would have compensated LaFrance roughly $110,000 total per year.

=== Winnipeg Blue Bombers ===
On February 13, 2018, it was announced that LaFrance had signed with the Winnipeg Blue Bombers. It was a one-year contract for about $80,000. LaFrance provided insurance as a backup to Andrew Harris, who had helped recruit LaFrance to join Winnipeg. LaFrance scored 2 rushing touchdowns in 2018, in two separate games against Montreal.

=== Saskatchewan Roughriders (second stint) ===
After fulfilling his contract with Winnipeg, LaFrance rejoined the Roughriders for the 2019 season. LaFrance saw limited usage on offense, but was a notable contributor on special teams by making 15 tackles. He also caught a pass from punter Jon Ryan on a fake punt, but the play was negated due to a coaching clerical error. LaFrance continued to mostly contribute on special teams during the 2021 season, and on December 22, 2021 was rewarded with a two-year contract extension. On June 4, 2023, LaFrance was released by the Roughriders.

=== BC Lions ===
On June 5, 2023, one day after being released by the Riders, LaFrance signed with the BC Lions. On February 13, 2024, LaFrance became a free agent, as his contract with the Lions was not renewed.

== Career statistics ==
		Rushing						Receiving
Year	Team	GP	Car	Yards	Avg	Long	TD	Rec	Yards	Avg	Long	TD
2015	OTT	16	6	17	2.8	8	0	2	1	0.5	1	0
2016	OTT	16	37	163	4.4	24	0	12	76	6.3	22	1
2017	SSK	13	68	273	4.0	18	2	14	123	8.8	18	1
2018	WPG	16	36	137	3.8	27	2	8	64	8.0	23	0
2019	SSK	18	2	9	4.5	7	0	0	0	0.0	0	0
2021	SSK	18	7	43	6.1	12	0	8	69	11.6	23	0
2022	SSK	11	9	39	4.3	11	0	5	28	5.6	7	0
2023	BC	10	7	27	3.9	11	0	1	4	4.0	4	0
CFL totals		114	172	708	4.1	27	4	50	365	7.34	23	2

== Coaching career ==
LaFrance joined the Manitoba Bisons in 2024 as the team's running backs coach.
