= Stephen McAdoo =

American football player and coach (born 1970)

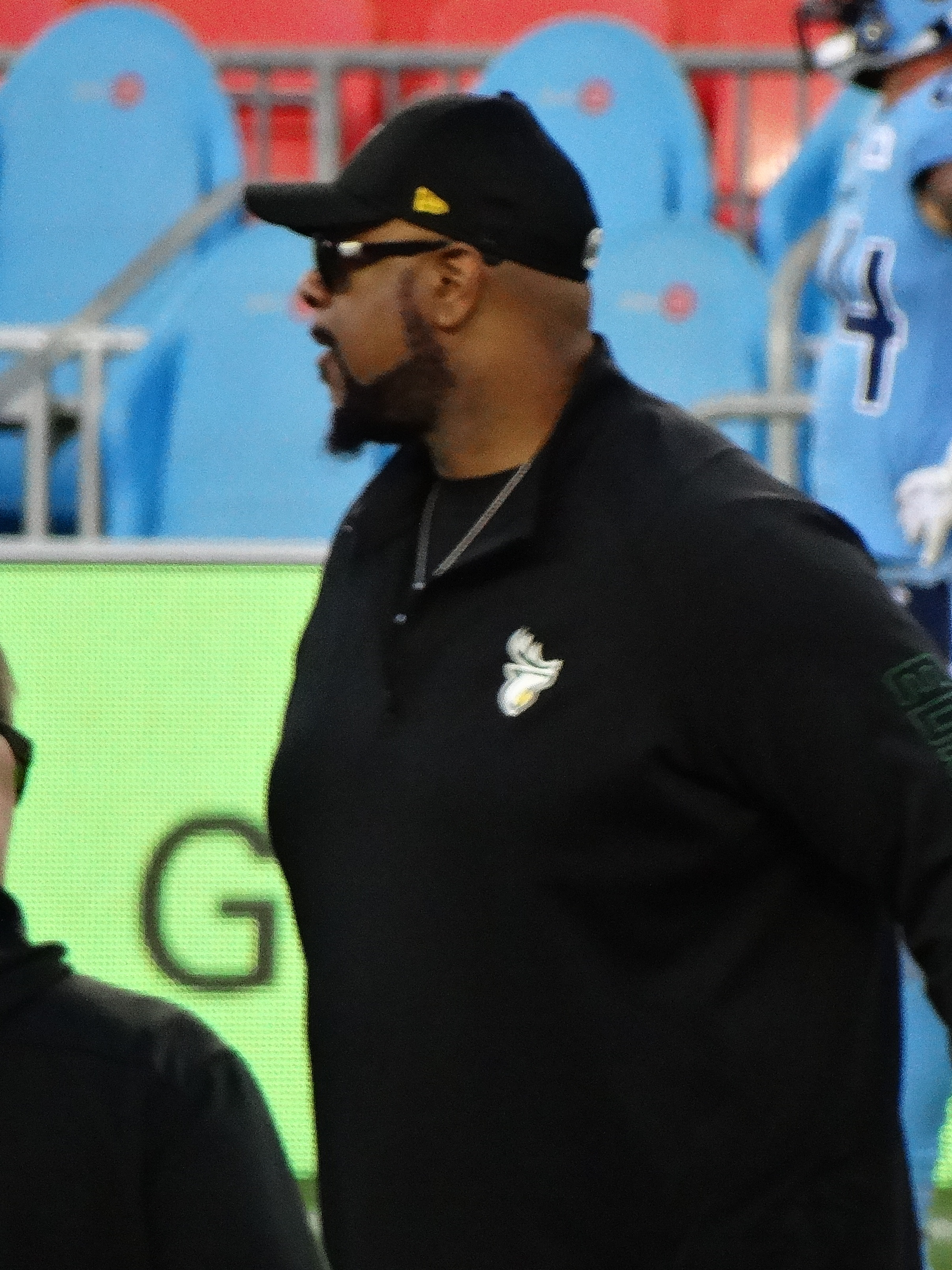
- McAdoo with the Edmonton Elks in 2023

Personal information
- Born: November 6, 1970 (age 56); Murfreesboro, Tennessee, U.S.
- Listed height: 6 ft 3 in (1.91 m)
- Listed weight: 295 lb (134 kg)

Career information
- High school: Oakland (TN)
- College: Middle Tennessee

Career history

Playing
- 1993: Cleveland Browns
- 1994–1995: Shreveport Pirates

Coaching
- 1996–1998: Middle Tennessee Blue Raiders (Tight ends coach)
- 1999–2002: Tennessee Tech Golden Eagles (Tight ends and offensive line coach)
- 2002–2007: Montreal Alouettes (Offensive line and running backs coach)
- 2006–2007: Montreal Alouettes (Co-offensive coordinator, offensive line, and running backs coach)
- 2010–2013: Toronto Argonauts (Run game coordinator and offensive line coach)
- 2014–2015: Edmonton Eskimos (Offensive coordinator)
- 2016–2019: Saskatchewan Roughriders (Offensive coordinator and assistant head coach)
- 2020–2021: Toronto Argonauts (Offensive line coach)
- 2022–2023: Edmonton Elks (Offensive coordinator)
- 2023: Edmonton Elks (Advisor)

Awards and highlights
- 2× Grey Cup champion (2012, 2015)

Stephen C. McAdoo (born November 6, 1970) is an American professional football coach and former player.

== Professional career ==
McAdoo played professionally as an offensive lineman for parts of three seasons for Cleveland Browns of the National Football League (NFL) and the Shreveport Pirates of the CFL.

== Recent coaching career ==
On February 6, 2020, it was announced that McAdoo had joined the Toronto Argonauts as the team's offensive line coach. The 2020 CFL season was cancelled, but he coached for the Argonauts in 2021 where the team finished in first place in the East Division.

On January 4, 2022, McAdoo formally joined the Edmonton Elks as the team's offensive coordinator. He retained the same role to begin the 2023 season, but after an 0–8 start to the season, McAdoo was demoted to an advisor role with the team on July 31, 2023, being placed by Jarious Jackson. He was not retained for the coaching staff in 2024.
