= Kacy Rodgers II =

American gridiron football player and coach (born 1992)

Profile
- Position: Safety

Personal information
- Born: April 2, 1992 (age 34); Knoxville, Tennessee, U.S.
- Listed height: 6 ft 2 in (1.88 m)
- Listed weight: 220 lb (100 kg)

Career information
- High school: Southlake Carroll (Southlake, Texas)
- College: Miami (FL)
- NFL draft: 2014: undrafted

Career history
- Edmonton Eskimos (2015)*; Saskatchewan Roughriders (2016–2017); New York Jets (2018)*
- * Offseason or practice squad member only

Awards and highlights
- Grey Cup champion (2015)

Career CFL statistics
- Tackles: 74
- Interceptions: 1
- Sacks: 1
- Forced Fumbles: 3
- Touchdowns: 0
- Stats at CFL.ca
- Stats at Pro Football Reference

Kacy Rodgers II (born April 2, 1992) is an American former professional football strong safety. He played college football at the University of Miami (2010-2013) where he received his Bachelor's degree in Economics. Kacy is currently enrolled in the MBA program at Southern Methodist University. His father Kacy Rodgers is currently the defensive line coach of the Tampa Bay Buccaneers.

== Professional career ==
In May 2014, Rodgers attended rookie minicamp on a tryout basis with the Kansas City Chiefs, but was not signed.

=== Edmonton Eskimos ===
In June 2015, he signed with the Edmonton Eskimos of the Canadian Football League (CFL). On June 21, 2015, Rodgers was released by the team following the final roster cuts deadline. He was signed to the team's practice roster on July 12, 2015.

=== Saskatchewan Roughriders ===
On August 9, 2016, Rodgers signed with the Saskatchewan Roughriders of the CFL.

=== New York Jets ===
On February 8, 2018, Rodgers signed with the New York Jets of the NFL, joining his father Kacy Rodgers, who is the defensive coordinator of the Jets. He was waived on August 31, 2018.
