= 2023 Saskatchewan Roughriders season =

CFL team season

- General manager: Jeremy O'Day
- President: Craig Reynolds
- Head coach: Craig Dickenson
- Home stadium: Mosaic Stadium

Results
- Record: 6–12
- Division place: 4th, West
- Playoffs: Did not qualify
- Team MOP: Larry Dean
- Team MODP: Larry Dean
- Team MOC: Samuel Emilus
- Team MOOL: Logan Ferland
- Team MOST: Adam Korsak
- Team MOR: Adam Korsak

The 2023 Saskatchewan Roughriders season was the 65th season for the team in the Canadian Football League (CFL). It was the club's 114th year overall, and its 107th season of play. The Roughriders failed to qualify for the playoffs for the second consecutive season after they lost their final game of the year to the Toronto Argonauts. The 2023 CFL season was the fourth season under head coach Craig Dickenson and general manager Jeremy O'Day.

== Offseason ==
=== CFL global draft ===
The 2023 CFL global draft took place on May 2, 2023. The Roughriders had the eighth selection in each round.

Round	Pick	Player	Position	University/Club Team	Nationality
1	3	Adam Korsak	P	Rutgers	Australia
2	12	Habakkuk Baldonado	DL	Pittsburgh	Italy

== CFL national draft ==
The 2023 CFL draft took place on May 2, 2023. The Roughriders had eight selections in the eight-round draft, with an additional seventh-round pick and the loss of a fifth-round pick. The team had the third selection in each round of the draft after finishing third-last in the 2022 league standings, not including traded picks.

Round	Pick	Player	Position	University team	Hometown
1	3	Lake Korte-Moore	DL	British Columbia	Ottawa, ON
2	11	Jaxon Ford	DB	Regina	Regina, SK
3	21	Matt Dean	LB	York	Ajax, ON
4	30	Thomas Bertrand-Hudon	RB	Delaware State	Mont Saint-Hilaire, QC
6	48	Sidy Sow	OL	Eastern Michigan	Bromont, QC
7	57	Evan Floren	OL	Queen's	Ancaster, ON
7	60	Nick Thomas	LB	Manitoba	Surrey, BC
8	66	Tavius Robinson	DL	Mississippi	Guelph, ON

== Preseason ==
Week	Game	Date	Kickoff	Opponent	Results		TV	Venue	Attendance	Summary
Week	Game	Date	Kickoff	Opponent	Score	Record	TV	Venue	Attendance	Summary
A	Bye									
B	1	Sat, May 27	5:00 p.m. CST	vs. BC Lions	W 30–27	1–0	None	Mosaic Stadium	22,908	Recap
C	2	Fri, June 2	6:30 p.m. CST	at Winnipeg Blue Bombers	W 28–16	2–0	TSN	IG Field	24,654	Recap

# Games played with primary home uniforms.
# Games played with white uniforms.

== Regular season ==
=== Standings ===
West Division
Team	GP	W	L	T	Pts	PF	PA	Div	Stk	
Winnipeg Blue Bombers	18	14	4	0	28	594	377	10–2	W4	Details
BC Lions	18	12	6	0	24	495	439	8–4	L1	Details
Calgary Stampeders	18	6	12	0	12	412	471	4–7	L1	Details
Saskatchewan Roughriders	18	6	12	0	12	387	551	5–7	L7	Details
Edmonton Elks	18	4	14	0	8	367	517	2–9	L4	Details

Calgary finished ahead of Saskatchewan in the standings because they went 2-1 in their 3-game head-to-head series.

=== Schedule ===
The Roughriders played in a neutral site game in Halifax, against the Toronto Argonauts, who were the home team for their Week 8 match-up. This was the second consecutive year that the two teams meet in Nova Scotia and the first repeat matchup in the Touchdown Atlantic series.

Week	Game	Date	Kickoff	Opponent	Results		TV	Venue	Attendance	Summary
Week	Game	Date	Kickoff	Opponent	Score	Record	TV	Venue	Attendance	Summary
1	1	Sun, June 11	5:00 p.m. CST	at Edmonton Elks	W 17–13	1–0	TSN	Commonwealth Stadium	32,233	Recap
2	2	Fri, June 16	7:00 p.m. CST	vs. Winnipeg Blue Bombers	L 27–45	1–1	TSN/CBSSN	Mosaic Stadium	28,299	Recap
3	3	Sat, June 24	5:00 p.m. CST	at Calgary Stampeders	W 29–26 (2OT)	2–1	TSN	McMahon Stadium	24,923	Recap
4	Bye									
5	ǁ 4 ǁ	Thu, July 6	7:00 p.m. CST	vs. Edmonton Elks	W 12–11	3–1	TSN/CBSSN	Mosaic Stadium	27,197	Recap
6	5	Sat, July 15	5:00 p.m. CST	vs. Calgary Stampeders	L 31–33	3–2	TSN/CBSSN	Mosaic Stadium	28,842	Recap
7	6	Sat, July 22	5:00 p.m. CST	at BC Lions	L 9–19	3–3	TSN/CBSSN	BC Place	23,902	Recap
8	7	Sat, July 29	2:00 p.m. CST	Toronto Argonauts	L 13–31	3–4	TSN/RDS2/CBSSN	Huskies Stadium	11,555	Recap
9	8	Sun, Aug 6	5:00 p.m. CST	vs. Ottawa Redblacks	W 26–24	4–4	TSN/RDS2/CBSSN	Mosaic Stadium	26,625	Recap
10	9	Fri, Aug 11	5:30 p.m. CST	at Montreal Alouettes	L 12–41	4–5	TSN/RDS	Molson Stadium	17,027	Recap
11	10	Sun, Aug 20	5:00 p.m. CST	vs. BC Lions	W 34–29	5–5	TSN/CBSSN	Mosaic Stadium	27,483	Recap
12	Bye									
13	ǁ 11 ǁ	Sun, Sep 3	5:00 p.m. CST	vs. Winnipeg Blue Bombers	W 32–30 (OT)	6–5	TSN/CBSSN	Mosaic Stadium	33,350	Recap
14	12	Sat, Sept 9	2:00 p.m. CST	at Winnipeg Blue Bombers	L 6–51	6–6	TSN	IG Field	32,343	Recap
15	13	Fri, Sept 15	7:30 p.m. CST	vs. Edmonton Elks	L 27–36	6–7	TSN	Mosaic Stadium	25,304	Recap
16	14	Fri, Sept 22	5:00 p.m. CST	at Ottawa Redblacks	L 28–36	6–8	TSN/RDS/CBSSN	TD Place Stadium	19,647	Recap
17	15	Fri, Sep 29	8:30 p.m. CST	at BC Lions	L 26–33	6–9	TSN	BC Place	22,735	Recap
18	ǁ 16 ǁ	Sat, Oct 7	5:00 p.m. CST	vs. Hamilton Tiger-Cats	L 13–38	6–10	TSN	Mosaic Stadium	27,579	Recap
19	17	Fri, Oct 13	7:30 p.m. CST	at Calgary Stampeders	L 26–19	6–11	TSN	McMahon Stadium	24,099	Recap
20	18	Sat, Oct 21	2:00 p.m. CST	vs. Toronto Argonauts	L 26–29	6–12	TSN	Mosaic Stadium	24,158	Recap
21	Bye									

# Games played with primary home uniforms.
# Games played with white uniforms.
ǁ # ǁ Games played with retro alternate uniforms.

== Roster ==
2023 Saskatchewan Roughriders final roster
**Quarterbacks**: 9 Jake Dolegala; 8 Mason Fine; 6 Antonio Pipkin; **Running backs**: 41 Albert Awachie; 30 Thomas Bertrand-Hudon; 25 Jamal Morrow; **Receivers**: 2 Mario Alford; 15 Shawn Bane; 19 Samuel Emilus; 14 Tevin Jones; 87 Bruno LaBelle; 81 Mitchell Picton; 89 Kian Schaffer-Baker; 83 Jerreth Sterns	**Offensive linemen**: 53 Philip Blake G; 61 Brandon Council T; 63 Logan Ferland G; 51 Peter Godber C; 64 Evan Johnson G; 52 Eric Lofton T; **Defensive linemen**: 95 Habakkuk Baldonado DE; 94 Demarcus Christmas DT; 50 Bryan Cox Jr. DE; 99 Charbel Dabire DT; 4 Micah Johnson DT; 49 Lake Korte-Moore DE/DT; 91 Anthony Lanier DE/DT; 45 Pete Robertson DE; 98 Brayden Thomas DE	**Linebackers**: 32 A. J. Allen; 47 T. J. Brunson; 11 Larry Dean; 48 Brian Harelimana; 43 Micah Teitz; **Defensive backs**: 38 Jayden Dalke; 16 Amari Henderson; 3 Nick Marshall; 26 Godfrey Onyeka; 31 Kosi Onyeka; 22 C. J. Reavis; 28 Trumaine Washington; 24 Deontai Williams; **Special teams**: 46 Jorgen Hus LS; 12 Brett Lauther K; 70 Kaare Vedvik P	**Practice roster**: 39 Rodney Clemons DB; 18 Abu Daramy-Swaray DB; 33 Matt Dean LB; 27 Mark Fields DB; 67 Zack Fry G; 71 Ryan Meskell K; 78 Max Parkinson DT; 35 Lukas Ruoss LB; 92 Caleb Sanders DT; 79 Riley Schick G; 62 Jordan Tucker T; 77 Isaiah Woodley WR; **Suspended list**: Jeremiah Poutasi T; Rashard Robinson DB	**Injured list**: 97 Christian Albright DL; 69 Logan Bandy C/G; 82 Juwan Brescacin SB; 90 Miles Brown DT; 37 Jeremy Clark DB; 96 Nicholas Dheilly DE; 17 Jaxon Ford DB; 7 Trevor Harris QB; 65 Jerald Hawkins T; 58 Justin Herdman-Reed LB; 20 Frankie Hickson RB; 66 Colin Kelly T; 84 Brayden Lenius SB; 21 Nelson Lokombo DB; 0 Rolan Milligan DB; 29 Jaylen Moody LB; 42 Derrick Moncrief LB; 5 Shea Patterson QB; 1 Jake Wieneke SB
Italics indicate American player • **Bold** indicates Global player

== Coaching staff ==
Saskatchewan Roughriders staff
Front office: President and CEO – Craig Reynolds; General Manager and Vice President of Football Operations – Jeremy O'Day; Assistant General Manager – Paul Jones; Assistant General Manager – Kyle Carson; Football Operations Manager – Jordan Greenly; Football Operations Intern – John Knisley; Director of Athletic Therapy – Ivan Gutfriend; Manager of Equipment – Gordon Gilroy; Head Coaches: Head Coach – Craig Dickenson; Offensive coaches: Offensive Coordinator and Quarterbacks – Kelly Jeffrey; Offensive Line – Anthony Vitale; Receivers – Drew Tate; Running Backs – André Bolduc; Offensive Assistant – Naaman Roosevelt	Defensive coaches: Defensive Coordinator – Jason Shivers; Defensive Line – Del Cowsette; Linebackers – Deion Melvin; Defensive Backs – Marcus Klund; Special teams coaches: Special Teams Coordinator – Kent Maugeri; Strength and conditioning: Strength and Conditioning Coordinator – Clinton Spencer; → Coaching staff
