= 2022 Saskatchewan Roughriders season =

CFL team season

- General manager: Jeremy O'Day
- President: Craig Reynolds
- Head coach: Craig Dickenson
- Home stadium: Mosaic Stadium

Results
- Record: 6–12
- Division place: 4th, West
- Playoffs: Did not qualify
- Team MOP: Darnell Sankey
- Team MODP: Darnell Sankey
- Team MOC: Kian Schaffer-Baker
- Team MOOL: Logan Ferland
- Team MOST: Mario Alford
- Team MOR: Frankie Hickson

The 2022 Saskatchewan Roughriders season was the 64th season for the team in the Canadian Football League (CFL). It was the club's 113th year overall, and its 106th season of play. The Roughriders were eliminated from post-season contention on October 22, 2022, following a loss to the Calgary Stampeders. The Roughriders failed to qualify for the playoffs for the first time since 2016. The 2022 CFL season was the third season under head coach Craig Dickenson and general manager Jeremy O'Day.

== Offseason ==
=== CFL global draft ===
The 2022 CFL global draft took place on May 3, 2022. The Roughriders selected fifth in each round of the snake draft.

Round	Pick	Player	Position	University/Club Team	Nationality
1	5	Jordan Genmark Heath	LB	California, Los Angeles	Sweden
2	14	Lukas Ruoss	LB	Bemidji State	Switzerland
3	23	Maceo Beard-Aigret	DB	Potsdam Royals	France

== CFL national draft ==
The 2022 CFL draft took place on May 3, 2022. The Roughriders had the seventh selection in each of the eight rounds of the draft after losing the West Final and finishing second in the 2021 league standings.

Round	Pick	Player	Position	University team	Hometown
1	7	Samuel Emilus	WR	Louisiana Tech	Montreal, QC
2	16	Zack Fry	OL	Western Ontario	London, ON
3	27	Diego Alatorre Montoya	OL	British Columbia	Tlajomulco de Zúñiga, Mexico
4	36	Tommy Bringi	LB	Wilfrid Laurier	London, ON
5	45	Tristan Fleury	DB	McGill	Deux-Montagnes, QC
6	54	Jayden Dalke	DE	Alberta	Leduc, AB
7	63	Zach Herzog	DB	Hillsdale	Windsor, ON
8	72	Riley Boersma	WR	Regina	Cambridge, ON

== Preseason ==
Week	Game	Date	Kickoff	Opponent	Results		TV	Venue	Attendance	Summary
Week	Game	Date	Kickoff	Opponent	Score	Record	TV	Venue	Attendance	Summary
A	Bye									
B	1	Tues, May 31	6:30 p.m. CST	vs. Winnipeg Blue Bombers	L 16–25	0–1	TSN	Mosaic Stadium	N/A	Recap
B	2	Fri, June 3	8:00 p.m. CST	at BC Lions	L 18–20	0–2	TSN	BC Place	N/A	Recap

# Games played with white uniforms.

== Regular season ==
=== Standings ===
West Division
Team	GP	W	L	T	Pts	PF	PA	Div	Stk	
Winnipeg Blue Bombers	18	15	3	0	30	538	370	10–1	W1	Details
BC Lions	18	12	6	0	24	525	405	8–4	L1	Details
Calgary Stampeders	18	12	6	0	24	533	373	7–5	W2	Details
Saskatchewan Roughriders	18	6	12	0	12	370	440	3–8	L7	Details
Edmonton Elks	18	4	14	0	8	354	599	1–11	L4	Details

=== Schedule ===
The Roughriders played in a neutral site game against the Toronto Argonauts who was the home team for their Week 6 match-up. It was confirmed on March 24, 2022, that the game would be played in Wolfville, Nova Scotia at Raymond Field as part of the Touchdown Atlantic series. Due to a COVID-19 outbreak, the home game against the Argonauts was rescheduled from July 23 to July 24.

Week	Game	Date	Kickoff	Opponent	Results		TV	Venue	Attendance	Summary
Week	Game	Date	Kickoff	Opponent	Score	Record	TV	Venue	Attendance	Summary
1	1	Sat, June 11	5:00 p.m. CST	vs. Hamilton Tiger-Cats	W 30–13	1–0	TSN	Mosaic Stadium	28,216	Recap
2	2	Sat, June 18	7:30 p.m. CST	at Edmonton Elks	W 26–16	2–0	TSN/ESPNews	Commonwealth Stadium	23,121	Recap
3	3	Thu, June 23	5:30 p.m. CST	at Montreal Alouettes	L 13–37	2–1	TSN/RDS	Molson Stadium	16,027	Recap
4	4	Sat, July 2	5:00 p.m. CST	vs. Montreal Alouettes	W 41–20	3–1	TSN/RDS/ESPN2	Mosaic Stadium	27,717	Recap
5	5	Fri, July 8	7:30 p.m. CST	vs. Ottawa Redblacks	W 28–13	4–1	TSN/RDS/ESPN2	Mosaic Stadium	26,685	Recap
6	6	Sat, July 16	12:00 p.m. CST	at Toronto Argonauts	L 24–30	4–2	TSN/RDS	Raymond Field	10,886	Recap
7	7	Sun, July 24	5:00 p.m. CST	vs. Toronto Argonauts	L 21–31	4–3	TSN/ESPNews	Mosaic Stadium	27,134	Recap
8	8	Fri, July 29	7:00 p.m. CST	vs. BC Lions	L 17–32	4–4	TSN/ESPN2	Mosaic Stadium	27,283	Recap
9	Bye									
10	9	Sat, Aug 13	8:00 p.m. CST	at Edmonton Elks	W 34–23	5–4	TSN	Commonwealth Stadium	25,351	Recap
11	10	Fri, Aug 19	8:00 p.m. CST	vs. BC Lions	L 10–28	5–5	TSN	Mosaic Stadium	28,442	Recap
12	11	Fri, Aug 26	8:30 p.m. CST	at BC Lions	W 23–16	6–5	TSN/ESPNews	BC Place	23,129	Recap
13	‖ 12 ‖	Sun, Sep 4	4:00 p.m. CST	vs. Winnipeg Blue Bombers	L 18–20	6–6	TSN	Mosaic Stadium	33,350	Recap
14	13	Sat, Sept 10	3:00 p.m. CST	at Winnipeg Blue Bombers	L 20–54	6–7	TSN/RDS2	IG Field	33,234	Recap
15	14	Fri, Sept 16	7:30 p.m. CST	vs. Edmonton Elks	L 24–26	6–8	TSN	Mosaic Stadium	27,000	Recap
16	Bye									
17	15	Fri, Sep 30	6:00 p.m. CST	at Winnipeg Blue Bombers	L 13–31	6–9	TSN/RDS2	IG Field	33,234	Recap
18	16	Fri, Oct 7	5:30 p.m. CST	at Hamilton Tiger-Cats	L 14–18	6–10	TSN/RDS2	Tim Hortons Field	21,456	Recap
19	Bye									
20	17	Sat, Oct 22	5:00 p.m. CST	vs. Calgary Stampeders	L 21–32	6–11	TSN	Mosaic Stadium	27,192	Recap
21	18	Sat, Oct 29	6:00 p.m. CST	at Calgary Stampeders	L 10–36	6–12	TSN	McMahon Stadium	25,179	Recap

# Games played with primary home uniforms.
# Games played with white uniforms.
ǁ # ǁ Games played with retro alternate uniforms.

== Roster ==
2022 Saskatchewan Roughriders final roster
**Quarterbacks**: 7 Cody Fajardo; 8 Mason Fine; **Running backs**: 41 Albert Awachie; 29 Shaq Cooper; 25 Jamal Morrow; 49 James Tuck; **Receivers**: 2 Mario Alford; 19 Samuel Emilus; 1 Shaq Evans; 87 Bruno LaBelle; 84 Brayden Lenius; 81 Mitchell Picton; 89 Kian Schaffer-Baker; 17 Jester Weah	**Offensive linemen**: 69 Logan Bandy C/G; 67 Dan Clark C; 63 Logan Ferland G/C; 64 Evan Johnson G; 66 Kooper Richardson T; 59 Josiah St. John G/T; 65 Terran Vaughn T; **Defensive linemen**: 90 Miles Brown DT; 99 Charbel Dabire DT; 39 Charleston Hughes DE; 95 Weston Kramer DT; 91 Anthony Lanier DT; 45 Pete Robertson DE; 93 Cody Roscoe DE	**Linebackers**: 32 A. J. Allen; 11 Larry Dean; 52 Jordan Genmark Heath; 50 Jordan Herdman-Reed; 58 Justin Herdman-Reed; 53 Darnell Sankey; **Defensive backs**: 24 Jordan Beaulieu; 28 Blace Brown; 37 Jeremy Clark; 38 Jayden Dalke; 0 Rolan Milligan; 26 Godfrey Onyeka; 31 Kosi Onyeka; 22 C. J. Reavis	**Special teams**: 46 Jorgen Hus LS; 12 Brett Lauther K; 70 Kaare Vedvik P/K; **Practice roster**: 54 Diego Alatorre Montoya G; 30 Tommy Bringi LB; 47 Alvin Jones LB; 62 Andrew Lauderdale T; 10 Levi Lewis QB; 74 Reece McCormick DT; 71 John Nell K; 79 Riley Schick G; 51 TJ Storment T	**Injured List**: 61 Jamal Campbell T; 94 Demarcus Christmas DT; 96 Nicholas Dheilly DE; 9 Jake Dolegala QB; 15 Mike Edem S; 52 Nigel Harris LB; 83 Jake Harty WR; 16 Amari Henderson DB; 20 Frankie Hickson RB; 48 Gary Johnson LB; 14 Tevin Jones WR; 98 David Kenney DE; 27 Kienan LaFrance RB; 6 A.C. Leonard DE; 85 Wesley Lewis WR; 21 Nelson Lokombo DB; 3 Nick Marshall DB; 18 Justin McInnis SB; 42 Derrick Moncrief LB; 4 Kyran Moore SB; 33 Justin Rice LB; 43 Micah Teitz LB; 5 Duke Williams SB
Italics indicate American player • **Bold** indicates Global player

== Coaching staff ==
Saskatchewan Roughriders staff
Front office: President and ceo – Craig Reynolds; General manager and vice president of football operations – Jeremy O'Day; Assistant general manager – Paul Jones; Assistant general manager – Kyle Carson; Football operations manager – Jordan Greenly; Football operations coordinator – Chase Pelletier; Director of athletic therapy – Ivan Gutfriend; Manager of equipment – Gordon Gilroy; Head coaches: Head coach – Craig Dickenson; Offensive coaches: Offensive coordinator – Jason Maas; Offensive line and run game coordinator – Stephen Sorrells; Receivers – Travis Moore; Running backs – Kelly Jeffrey	Defensive coaches: Defensive coordinator – Jason Shivers; Defensive line – Ben Olson; Linebackers – Deion Melvin; Defensive backs – Marcus Klund; Special teams coaches: Special teams coordinator – Kent Maugeri; Strength and conditioning: Strength and conditioning coordinator – Clinton Spencer; → Coaching staff
