= Kaare Vedvik =

Norwegian gridiron football player (born 1994)

Profile
- Positions: Placekicker, punter

Personal information
- Born: March 16, 1994 (age 32); Stavanger, Norway
- Listed height: 6 ft 4 in (1.93 m)
- Listed weight: 215 lb (98 kg)

Career information
- High school: McPherson (McPherson, Kansas, U.S.)
- College: Marshall (2013–2017)
- NFL draft: 2018: undrafted
- CFL draft: 2021G: 2nd round, 14th overall pick

Career history
- Baltimore Ravens (2018); Minnesota Vikings (2019)*; New York Jets (2019); Cincinnati Bengals (2019)*; Buffalo Bills (2020)*; Carolina Panthers (2020)*; Washington Football Team (2020)*; Jacksonville Jaguars (2021)*; Saskatchewan Roughriders (2021–2023); Hamilton Tiger-Cats (2023–2024); Oslo Vikings (2026)
- * Offseason or practice squad member only

Awards and highlights
- All C-USA First Team (2017); Norwegian National Champion (2026)

Career NFL statistics
- Field goals: 0
- Field goal attempts: 1
- Stats at Pro Football Reference

Career CFL statistics as of 2023
- Games played: 32
- Punts: 185
- Punt yardage: 8,256
- Average punt: 44.6
- Stats at CFL.ca

Kaare Vedvik (CORE-ee VED-vick; born March 16, 1994) is a Norwegian professional gridiron football placekicker and punter. He most recently played for the Hamilton Tiger-Cats of the Canadian Football League (CFL). Vedvik played college football at Marshall and signed with the Baltimore Ravens as an undrafted free agent in 2018. He has also been a member of several other National Football League (NFL) teams. In 2026 he played for the Oslo Vikings who compete in the highest division in the Norwegian American Football league "Eliteserien".

== Early life ==
Vedvik was born and raised in Norway to a Nigerian immigrant father and Norwegian mother, and first came in contact with American football when he joined the Stavanger based team AFC Show in 2011. Vedvik later spent his junior year playing for McPherson High School in McPherson, Kansas, as an exchange student in the United States. He initially wanted to play wide receiver, but his coaches at McPherson discovered he was better suited to play kicker.

== College career ==
Vedvik joined Marshall in 2013. After using a redshirt season in 2013, Vedvik served as Marshall's kickoff specialist in 2014. Vedvik did not play in 2015, serving as backup punter. He became Marshall's punter in 2016, and was named Conference USA Special Teams Player of the Week on November 1, 2016. Vedvik was Marshall's punter and placekicker in 2017. On October 14, 2017, Vedvik kicked a 92-yard punt, the seventh longest in FBS history and the longest since Ray Guy's 93-yard punt in 1972. He was named 2017 C-USA All-Conference First-team as a punter.

== Professional career ==
=== Baltimore Ravens ===
Vedvik was signed as an undrafted free agent by the Baltimore Ravens in 2018. He was placed on the reserve/non-football injury list after he was assaulted before the season began.

In the 2019 preseason opener on August 8, Vedvik made all four of his field goals, including a 55-yard try.

=== Minnesota Vikings ===
On August 11, 2019, Vedvik was traded to the Minnesota Vikings for a fifth-round pick in the 2020 NFL draft. He was waived on August 31 after losing the kicker job to veteran Dan Bailey.

=== New York Jets ===
On September 1, 2019, Vedvik was claimed off waivers by the New York Jets. During the season opener against the Buffalo Bills, he missed an extra point attempt and a 45-yard field goal, and the Jets narrowly lost 17–16. Vedvik was waived on September 10.

=== Cincinnati Bengals ===
On December 16, 2019, Vedvik was signed to the Cincinnati Bengals practice squad. His practice squad contract with the team expired on January 6, 2020.

=== Buffalo Bills ===
On January 7, 2020, Vedvik signed a reserve/futures contract with the Buffalo Bills. He was waived on August 19.

=== Carolina Panthers ===
Vedvik was claimed off waivers by the Carolina Panthers on August 20, 2020. He was waived on September 5, and signed to the practice squad the next day. Vedvik was waived again on September 15.

=== Washington Football Team ===
Vedvik signed with the practice squad of the Washington Football Team on October 9, 2020. On January 11, 2021, Vedvik signed a reserve/futures contract with Washington, but was waived with a non-football injury designation on January 28.

=== Jacksonville Jaguars ===
Vedvik was signed to the practice squad of the Jacksonville Jaguars on September 3, 2021. He was released five days later.

=== Saskatchewan Roughriders ===
On April 15, 2021, Vedvik was drafted by the Saskatchewan Roughriders in the second round of the 2021 CFL global draft. On October 10, it was announced that he had signed with the Roughriders. With an injury to the team's incumbent punter, Jon Ryan, Vedvik played in four regular season games as a punter and also played in two post-season games.

With the Roughriders letting Ryan become a free agent in 2022, Vedvik became the team's punter for the season, where he played in all 18 regular season games where he had 107 punts for a 44.5-yard average and four singles. Vedvik also handled some of the kickoffs where he had 20 kickoffs with a 66.7-yard average and one single. In 2023, Vedvik began the season on the injured list and was replaced by Adam Korsak.

=== Hamilton Tiger-Cats ===
On August 13, 2023, it was announced that Vedvik had been traded to the Hamilton Tiger-Cats in exchange for Antonio Pipkin. He played in 10 regular season games where he had 50 punts for a 44.2-yard average with one single. Vedvik also played in the team's East Semi-Final loss to the Montreal Alouettes.

To begin the 2024 season, Vedvik was placed on the practice roster as Nik Constantinou became the punter for the Tiger-Cats. Vedvik was later released on August 27, 2024.

=== Oslo Vikings ===
In 2026 Vedvik played for the Oslo Vikings in the "Eliteserien" (highest division for American football in Norway). Went 2 of 3 on FG kicking, and 2 of 2 on PAT kicks. Led the league in punt distance with 1088 yards on 25 attempts, with a long of 67 yards. Averaged 43,5 yards per punt, best in the league. Oslo Vikings won the national championship in 2026.
