= Bruno LaBelle =

Canadian gridiron football player (born 1997)

Profile
- Position: Wide receiver

Personal information
- Born: June 3, 1997 (age 29); Montreal, Quebec, Canada
- Listed height: 6 ft 4 in (1.93 m)
- Listed weight: 250 lb (113 kg)

Career information
- College: Cincinnati (2017–2020)
- CFL draft: 2021: 3rd round, 20th overall pick

Career history
- 2021: Arizona Cardinals*
- 2022–2024: Saskatchewan Roughriders
- 2025: Toronto Argonauts*
- 2025: Hamilton Tiger-Cats*
- * Offseason or practice squad member only
- Stats at CFL.ca

Bruno LaBelle (born June 3, 1997) is a Canadian professional football wide receiver. He was most recently a member of the Hamilton Tiger-Cats of the Canadian Football League (CFL).

== College career ==
After using a redshirt season in 2016, LaBelle played college football for the Cincinnati Bearcats from 2017 to 2020. He played in 46 games as a tight end where he caught 20 passes for 150 yards and two touchdowns.

== Professional career ==
=== Arizona Cardinals ===
After going undrafted in the 2021 NFL draft, LaBelle was signed by the Arizona Cardinals on May 1, 2021. After sustaining an injury, he was placed on the injured reserve on August 10, 2021. He was later released on September 14, 2021, after reaching an injury settlement with the team.

=== Saskatchewan Roughriders ===
LaBelle was drafted in the third round, 20th overall, in the 2021 CFL draft by the Saskatchewan Roughriders, but spent 2021 pursuing opportunities in the National Football League. He then signed with the Roughriders on May 15, 2022. He made the team's opening day roster following training camp in 2022 and made his professional debut on June 11, 2022, against the Hamilton Tiger-Cats. LaBelle dressed in 15 regular season games where he had one catch for 18 yards and one kickoff return for three yards.

In 2023, LaBelle dressed in 14 regular season games, but did not record any statistics. In the 2024 season, he began the year on the injured list before being relegated to the practice roster on September 19, 2024. His contract expired at the end of the Roughriders' season on November 10, 2024.

=== Toronto Argonauts ===
On February 10, 2025, it was announced that LaBelle had signed with the Toronto Argonauts. However, he was released in training camp on May 20, 2025.

=== Hamilton Tiger-Cats ===
On May 22, 2025, it was announced that LaBelle had signed with the Hamilton Tiger-Cats. He was part of the final cuts on June 1, 2025.
