= Kosi Onyeka =

Canadian gridiron football player (born 1999)

Berlin Thunder (ELF)
- Position: Defensive back
- Roster status: Active

Personal information
- Born: October 26, 1999 (age 27); Brampton, Ontario, Canada
- Listed height: 6 ft 0 in (1.83 m)
- Listed weight: 195 lb (88 kg)

Career information
- University: Guelph
- CFL draft: 2021: undrafted

Career history
- 2022–2025: Saskatchewan Roughriders
- 2026–present: Berlin Thunder
- Stats at CFL.ca

Kosi Onyeka (born October 26, 1999) is a Canadian professional football defensive back for the Berlin Thunder in the American Football League Europe. He most recently played for the Saskatchewan Roughriders of the Canadian Football League (CFL).

== University career ==
Onyeka played U Sports football for the Guelph Gryphons from 2017 to 2021. He played in 25 games where he had 64 tackles, 3.5 tackles for a loss, one interception, one forced fumble, and three pass breakups.

== Professional career ==
Onyeka was eligible for the shortened 2021 CFL draft, but was not drafted and returned to the Gryphons for their 2021 season. He was later signed by the Saskatchewan Roughriders on February 28, 2022. Onyeka began the 2022 season on the practice roster, but soon after made his professional debut on June 18, 2022, against the Edmonton Elks. He dressed in eight regular season games that year where he recorded one defensive tackle and one special teams tackle.

In 2023, Onyeka was part of the final training camp cuts and was released on June 4, 2023. However, he was re-signed on June 21, 2023, to a practice roster agreement. He then dressed in 15 regular season games where he had one defensive tackle and 17 special teams tackles.

In the 2024 season, Onyeka played in ten regular season games and recorded one defensive tackle, seven special teams tackles, and one forced fumble. He was scheduled to become a free agent in February 2025, but instead signed a contract extension on January 31, 2025. In 2025, he played in seven regular season games and recorded 10 special teams tackles. Onyeka was later released on September 30, 2025.

Onyeka signed with the Berlin Thunder in the American Football League Europe as an international import in March 2026.

== Personal life ==
Onyeka was born to parents Vin and Nwando Onyeka. Onyeka's older brother, Nakas, played at linebacker in the Canadian Football League for four seasons. His younger brother, Ifenna, plays at defensive lineman and was drafted by the Toronto Argonauts. Onyeka is the cousin of defensive end Kene Onyeka and defensive back Godfrey Onyeka, both of whom also play in the CFL. He is of Nigerian descent.
