= Rolan Milligan =

American gridiron football player (born 1994)

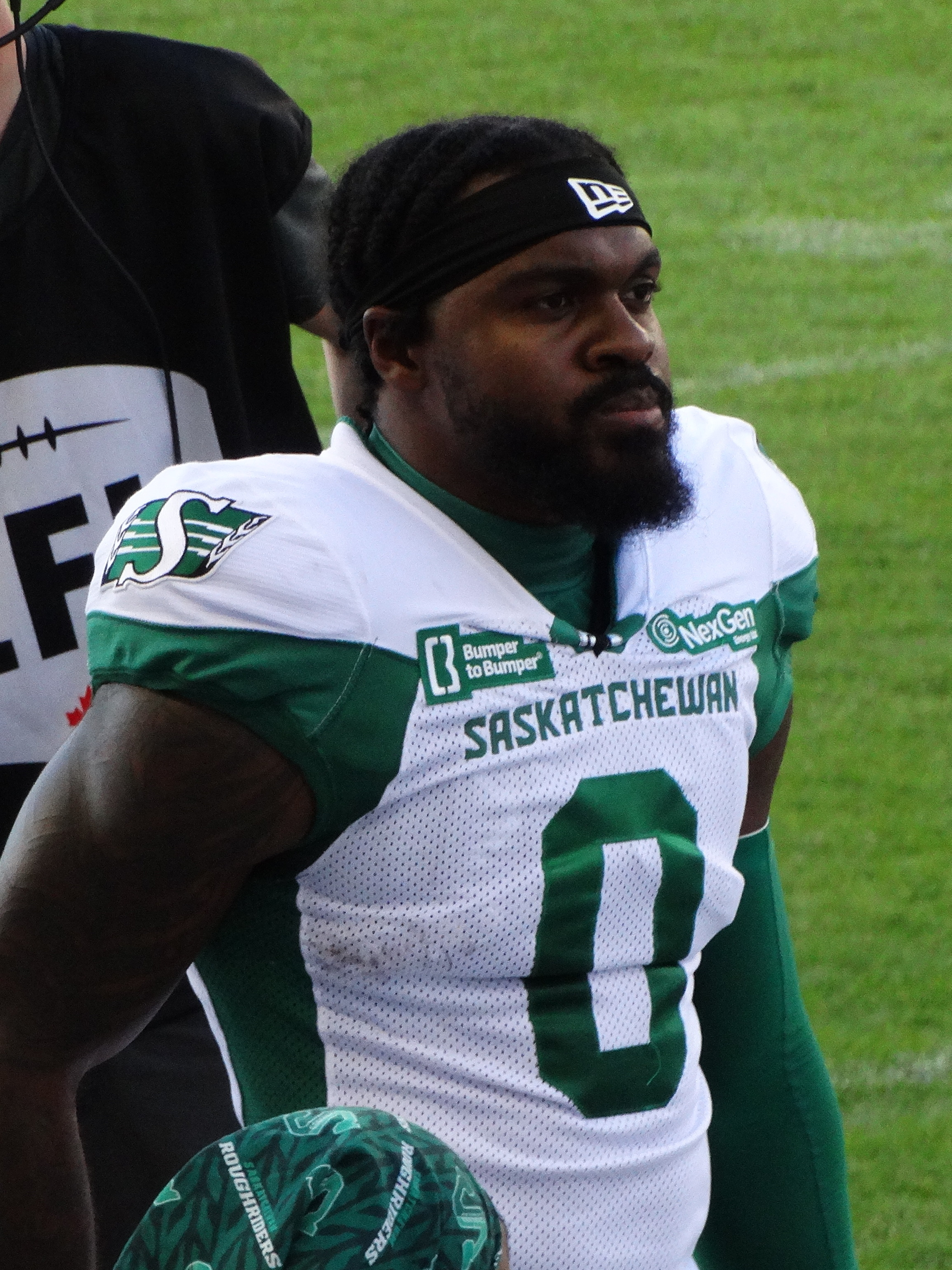
- Milligan with the Saskatchewan Roughriders in 2025

No. 0 – Saskatchewan Roughriders
- Position: Defensive back
- Roster status: 6-game injured list
- CFL status: American

Personal information
- Born: August 16, 1994 (age 32); Lake Wales, Florida, U.S.
- Listed height: 5 ft 10 in (1.78 m)
- Listed weight: 200 lb (91 kg)

Career information
- High school: Lake Wales
- College: Reedley (2013); UAB (2014); Toledo (2015)
- NFL draft: 2016: undrafted

Career history
- Dallas Cowboys (2016)*; Detroit Lions (2017–2018); Indianapolis Colts (2018–2021); Saskatchewan Roughriders (2021–present)
- * Offseason or practice squad member only

Awards and highlights
- Grey Cup champion (2025); CFL's Most Outstanding Defensive Player Award (2024); Norm Fieldgate Trophy (2024); 2× CFL All-Star (2024, 2025); 2× CFL West All-Star (2024, 2025)

Career NFL statistics
- Total tackles: 15
- Stats at Pro Football Reference

Career CFL statistics as of 2025
- Total tackles: 251
- Sacks: 2
- Interceptions: 15
- Forced fumbles: 1
- Stats at CFL.ca

Rolan Lenard Milligan (born August 16, 1994) is an American professional football defensive back for the Saskatchewan Roughriders of the Canadian Football League (CFL). He played college football at UAB in 2014 and transferred to Toledo in 2015 after the University of Alabama at Birmingham cancelled its football program. Milligan has also been a member of the Dallas Cowboys, Detroit Lions, and Indianapolis Colts.

== Early life ==
Milligan attended Lake Wales High School, where he played as a quarterback. He received honorable-mention 5A all-state honors as a senior.

== College career ==
Milligan enrolled at Reedley College. As a sophomore, he registered 44 tackles, 3 interceptions and 2 fumble recoveries. He transferred to the University of Alabama at Birmingham after the season. As a junior, he started in 8 out of 12 games, collecting 54 tackles (second on the team), 2 sacks, 4 tackles for loss, and 6 passes defensed. He transferred to the University of Toledo after UAB announced the cancelling of its football program. As a senior, he started in 8 out of 11 games, while playing as a nickelback. He tallied 48 tackles, 2 interceptions, 3 passes defensed and 3 forced fumbles. He had 9 tackles and 2 passes defensed against No. 24 ranked Temple University.

== Professional career ==
Pre-draft measurables
Height	Weight	Arm length	Hand span	Wingspan	Vertical jump	Broad jump	Bench press
5 ft 10 1/4 in (1.78 m)	195 lb (88 kg)	30 1/2 in (0.77 m)	8 7/8 in (0.23 m)	6 ft 1 3/8 in (1.86 m)	35.5 in (0.90 m)	9 ft 10 in (3.00 m)	23 reps
All values from Pro Day

=== Dallas Cowboys ===
Milligan was signed as an undrafted free agent by the Dallas Cowboys after the 2016 NFL draft on May 9. He was waived/injured on August 4, 2016, and placed on injured reserve. He was released by the team on August 16.

=== Detroit Lions ===
On February 9, 2017, Milligan signed as a free agent with the Detroit Lions. He was waived on September 2, 2017, and was signed to the Lions' practice squad the next day. He was promoted to the active roster on November 27, 2017. He was waived on December 9, 2017, and later re-signed to the practice squad. He signed a reserve/future contract with the Lions on January 1, 2018. On September 1, 2018, Milligan was waived by the Lions and was signed to the practice squad the next day. He was released on September 5, 2018. He was re-signed to the practice squad on October 3, 2018, but was released three days later.

=== Indianapolis Colts ===
On October 23, 2018, Milligan was signed to the Indianapolis Colts practice squad. He was promoted to the active roster on December 22, 2018, but was waived six days later and re-signed to the practice squad. He was promoted back to the active roster on January 9, 2019. On September 2, 2019, Milligan was waived by the Colts and re-signed to the practice squad. He was promoted to the active roster on September 11, 2019. He was placed on injured reserve on December 18, 2019. Milligan signed the exclusive rights tender with the Colts on March 28, 2020. On August 5, 2020, he announced he would opt out of the 2020 season due to the COVID-19 pandemic. On August 6, 2021, Milligan was waived by the Colts.

=== Saskatchewan Roughriders ===
On October 24, 2021, Milligan signed with the Saskatchewan Roughriders of the Canadian Football League (CFL). He made his CFL debut in the last week of the 2021 regular season on November 20, 2021, against the Hamilton Tiger-Cats, where he had five defensive tackles, one special teams tackle, and one sack. In 2022, Milligan played in 17 regular season games where he had 71 defensive tackles, 11 special teams tackles, one sack, one interception, and one forced fumble.

Milligan played in the first four games of the 2023 season before suffering a season-ending toe injury. In those four games, he had 17 defensive tackles, three special teams tackles, and two interceptions.
