= Nelson Lokombo =

Canadian gridiron football player (born 1999)

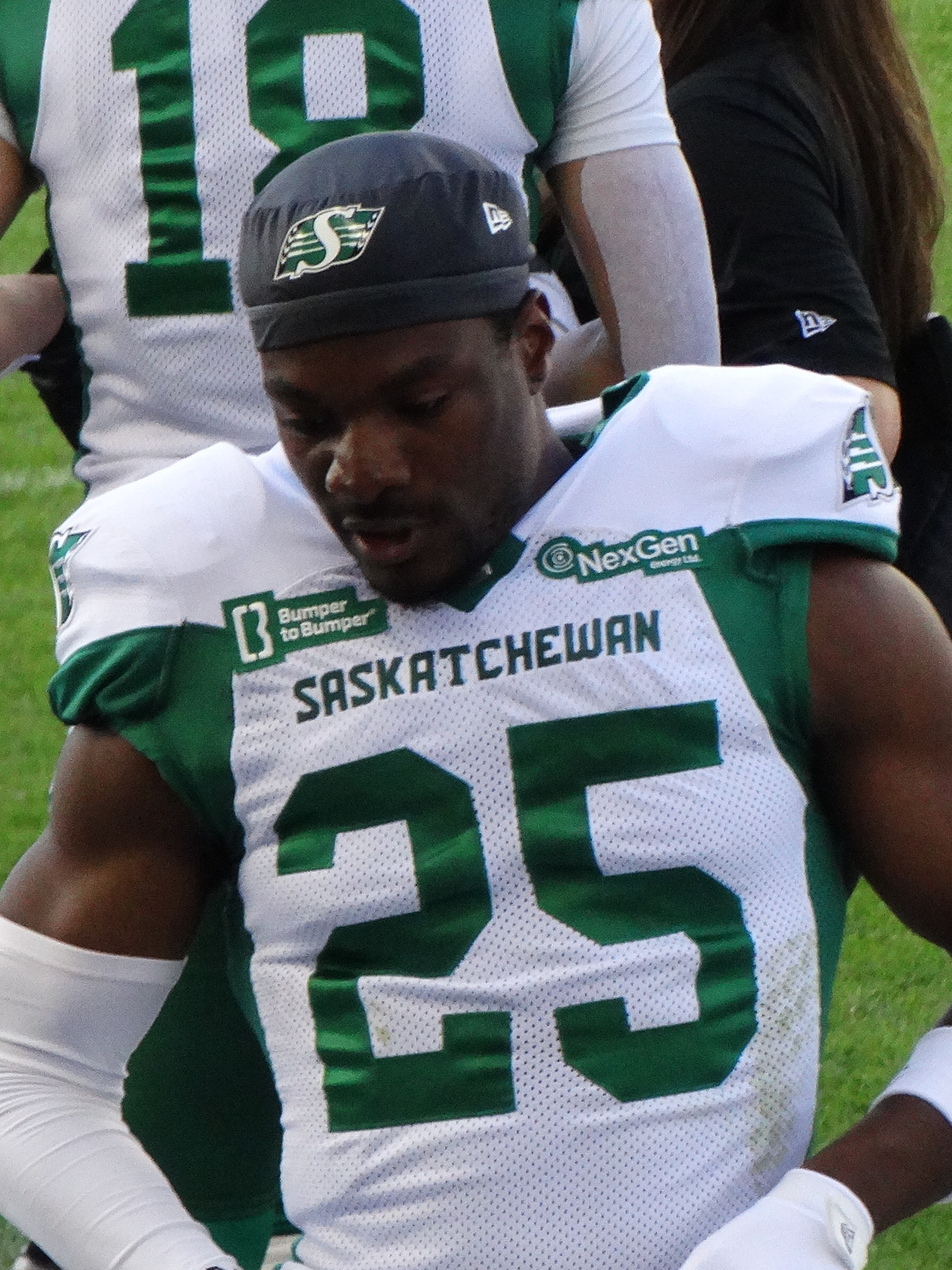
- Lokombo with the Saskatchewan Roughriders in 2025

No. 25 – Saskatchewan Roughriders
- Position: Defensive back
- Roster status: Active
- CFL status: National

Personal information
- Born: March 23, 1999 (age 27); Abbotsford, British Columbia, Canada
- Listed height: 5 ft 11 in (1.80 m)
- Listed weight: 190 lb (86 kg)

Career information
- High school: W. J. Mouat Secondary
- University: Saskatchewan Huskies
- CFL draft: 2021: 1st round, 2nd overall pick

Career history
- 2021–present: Saskatchewan Roughriders

Awards and highlights
- Grey Cup champion (2025); First-team All-Canadian (2019); Presidents' Trophy (2019)
- Stats at CFL.ca

Nelson Lokombo (born March 23, 1999) is a Canadian professional football defensive back for the Saskatchewan Roughriders of the Canadian Football League (CFL).

== University career ==
Lokombo played U Sports football for the Saskatchewan Huskies from 2017 to 2019. In 2019, he was named a First-team All-Canadian and was also awarded the Presidents' Trophy as the top defensive player in U Sports football. He did not play in 2020 due to the cancellation of the 2020 U Sports football season.

== Professional career ==
Pre-draft measurables
Height	Weight	40-yard dash	20-yard shuttle	Three-cone drill	Broad jump	Bench press
5 ft 10 3/4 in (1.80 m)	184.3 lb (84 kg)	4.66 s	4.03 s	6.76 s	9 ft 11 3/4 in (3.04 m)	10 reps
All values from CFL Combine

In the CFL Scouting Bureau's Final Rankings, Lokombo was named the 17th best player available in the 2021 CFL draft. However, he exceeded those rankings and was drafted second overall by the Saskatchewan Roughriders and signed with the team on June 4, 2021. Unfortunately, he suffered a torn Achilles tendon in a pre-training camp workout and sat out the entire 2021 season.

Following 2022 training camp, Lokombo not only won a roster spot, but was also named an opening day starter at cornerback. He made his professional debut on June 11, 2022, against the Hamilton Tiger-Cats where he had one defensive tackle. He started the first three games of the season before being moved to the injured list for the fourth game of the season. Upon his return the active roster, Lokombo moved primarily to a backup role before returning to the injured list for the final five games of the season. He played in 12 regular season games, starting in four, where he had 13 defensive tackles, one special teams tackle, and one forced fumble.

In 2023, Lokombo played in the first 10 games of the regular season before sitting out seven of the last eight due to injury. He played in 11 games, starting in one, where he had five defensive tackles and four special teams tackles.

== Personal life ==
Lokombo is the youngest of five brothers, with Boseko playing linebacker professionally in the CFL and Boloy having played defensive back for Minnesota–Duluth.
