= Logan Ferland =

Canadian gridiron football player (born 1997)

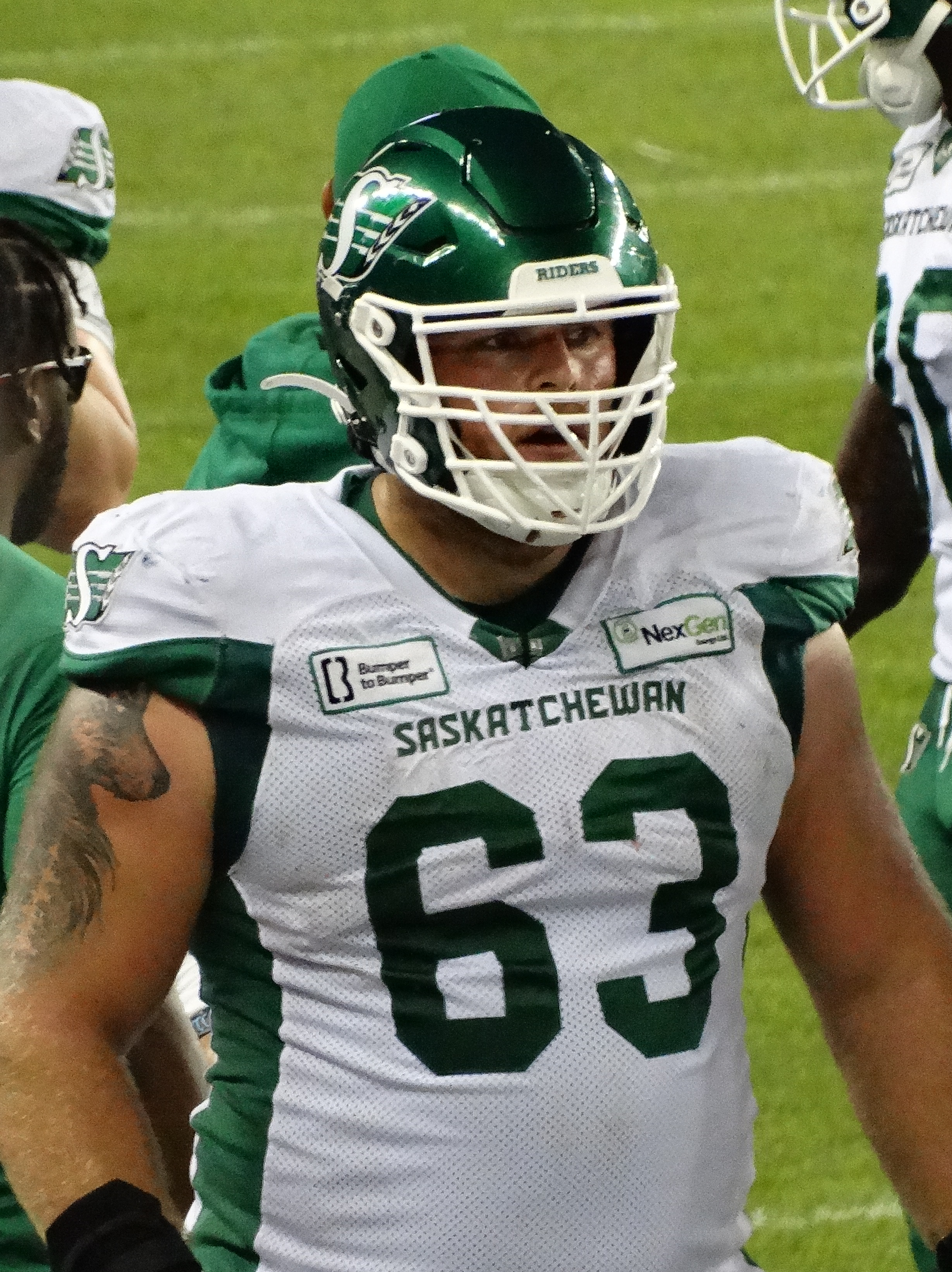
- Ferland with the Saskatchewan Roughriders in 2024

No. 63 – Saskatchewan Roughriders
- Position: Offensive lineman
- Roster status: Active
- CFL status: National

Personal information
- Born: April 14, 1997 (age 29); Melfort, Saskatchewan, Canada
- Listed height: 6 ft 4 in (1.93 m)
- Listed weight: 300 lb (136 kg)

Career information
- High school: Melfort and Unit Comprehensive Collegiate
- CJFL: Regina Thunder

Career history
- Saskatchewan Roughriders (2019–present)

Awards and highlights
- Grey Cup champion (2025); 2× CFL All-Star (2024, 2025); 3x CFL West All-Star (2024, 2025, 2026); DeMarco–Becket Memorial Trophy (2024); Jake Gaudaur Veterans' Trophy (2025); 3x CJFL All-Canadian (2016, 2018, 2019); 4x PFC All-Star (2016-2019); PFC Outstanding Offensive Lineman Award winner (2019)
- Stats at CFL.ca

Logan Ferland (born April 14, 1997) is a Canadian professional football offensive lineman for the Saskatchewan Roughriders of the Canadian Football League (CFL). He previously spent five seasons with the Regina Thunder in the Prairie Football Conference (PFC) of the Canadian Junior Football League (CJFL). He did not play college football.

== Early life ==
Ferland was born on April 14, 1997, in Melfort, Saskatchewan. He went to high school at Melfort and Unit Comprehensive Collegiate.

He spent five years with the Regina Thunder from 2015-2019. He was selected to the PFC All-Star team for four consecutive seasons (2016 to 2019), and in 2018, was a unanimous selection. Also in 2018, he was named a CJFL All-Canadian. In 2019, Ferland won the PFC's Most Outstanding Offensive Lineman award.

== Professional career ==
In 2019, Ferland joined the Saskatchewan Roughriders as a territorial junior, spending that season on the Roughriders' practice roster while still playing for the Regina Thunder.

On November 28, 2019, Ferland was signed to the active roster of the Roughriders. He did not play any games in 2020 due to the cancellation of the CFL season because of the COVID-19 pandemic.

The 2021 season was the first in which Ferland played games for the Roughriders. He played all 14 regular season games that year, starting 13 at left guard, before moving to centre for the final game of the regular-season. He also started at left guard for the West Semi-Final and West Final. On December 27, 2021, he signed a contract extension with the team.

In 2022, Ferland started 15 games at left guard. He was voted the Roughriders’ Most Outstanding Lineman.

In 2023, he started all 18 games at right guard, while serving twice as an in-game fill-in at right tackle due to injury. He was voted the Roughriders’ Most Outstanding Lineman for the second straight season.

On January 22, 2024, Ferland signed a two-year contract extension with the Roughriders. He was ejected from the 2024 season opener for punching Edmonton Elks defensive back Leon O'Neal Jr. in the helmet.
