= Samuel Emilus =

Canadian gridiron football player (born 1997)

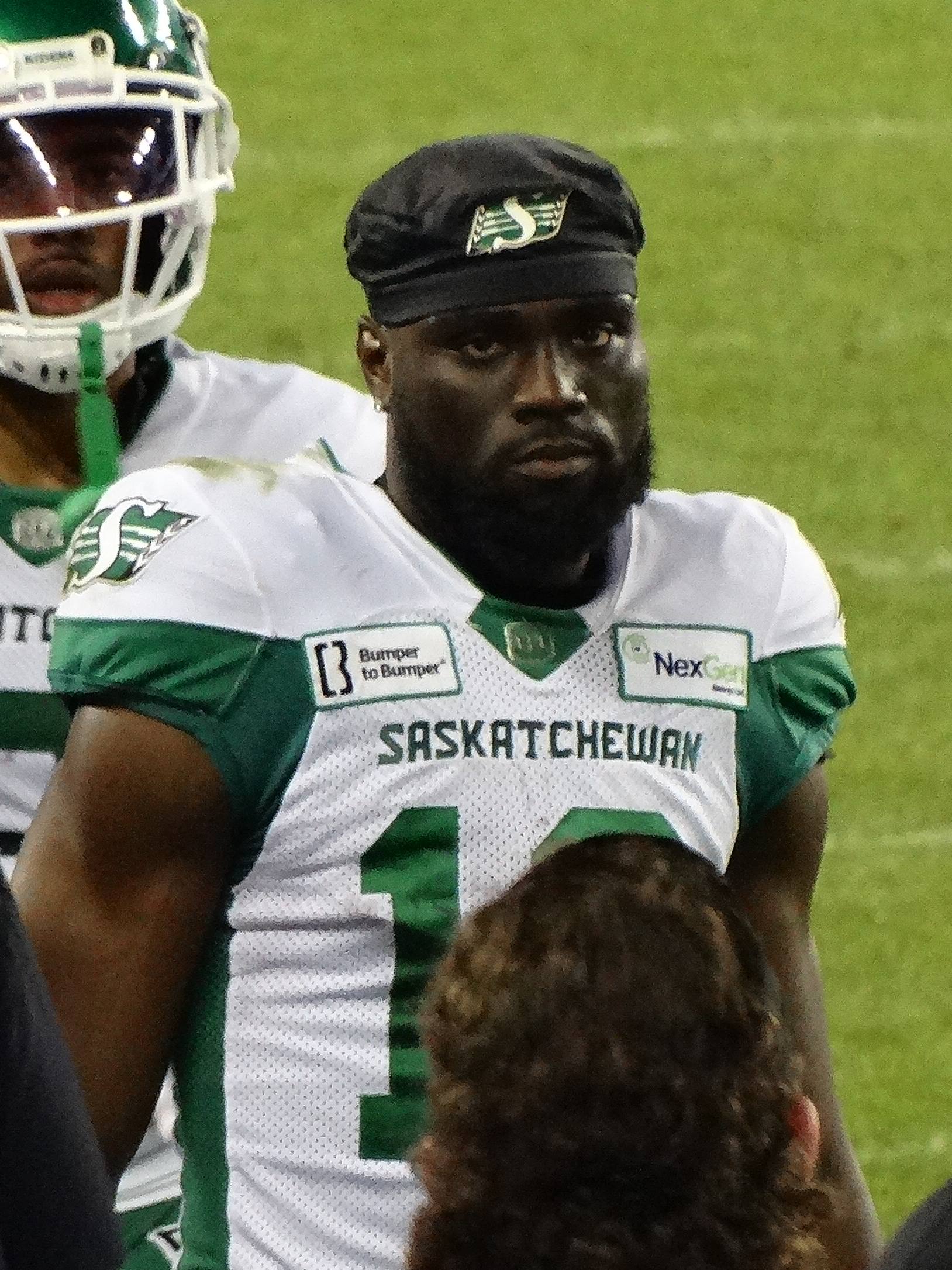
- Emilus with the Saskatchewan Roughriders in 2024

No. 19 – Saskatchewan Roughriders
- Position: Wide receiver
- Roster status: Active
- CFL status: National

Personal information
- Born: October 25, 1997 (age 29); Montreal, Quebec, Canada
- Listed height: 6 ft 0 in (1.83 m)
- Listed weight: 200 lb (91 kg)

Career information
- High school: Curé-Antoine-Labelle
- CEGEP: Vanier College
- College: Massachusetts; Louisiana Tech
- CFL draft: 2022: 1st round, 7th overall pick

Career history
- Saskatchewan Roughriders (2022–present)

Awards and highlights
- Grey Cup champion (2025); Grey Cup Most Valuable Canadian (2025); CFL West All-Star (2024)

Career CFL statistics as of 2026
- Receptions: 251
- Receiving yards: 3,496
- Receiving touchdowns: 18
- Stats at CFL.ca

Samuel Emilus (born October 25, 1997) is a Canadian professional football wide receiver for the Saskatchewan Roughriders of the Canadian Football League (CFL).

== College career ==
Emilus played college football for the UMass Minutemen from 2018 to 2020. He played in 22 games, starting in 13, where he recorded 59 receptions for 653 yards and seven touchdowns, six kick returns for 114 yards, and four punt returns for 57 yards.

As a graduate, he transferred to Louisiana Tech University in 2021 to play for the Bulldogs football team. He played in eight games, starting two, where he had 18 catches for 257 yards and three touchdowns.

== Professional career ==
Pre-draft measurables
Height	Weight	Arm length	Hand span	Wingspan	40-yard dash	10-yard split	20-yard split	20-yard shuttle	Three-cone drill	Vertical jump	Broad jump	Bench press
6 ft 0 1/2 in (1.84 m)	194 lb (88 kg)	31 1/2 in (0.80 m)	9 1/2 in (0.24 m)	6 ft 4 5/8 in (1.95 m)	4.59 s	1.47 s	2.66 s	4.13 s	6.88 s	37.0 in (0.94 m)	10 ft 4 in (3.15 m)	9 reps
All values from Pro Day

Entering the 2022 CFL draft, Emilus was ranked as the 11th best prospect by the CFL Scouting Bureau. He was then drafted in the first round, seventh overall, by the Saskatchewan Roughriders and signed with the team on May 17, 2022. He began the 2022 season on the injured list, but made his professional debut in week 2, on June 18, 2022, against the Edmonton Elks. In his fifth game, he made his first career start, on July 16, 2022, in the Touchdown Atlantic game against the Toronto Argonauts. He played in 15 regular season games in his rookie year, starting four, where he recorded ten catches for 165 yards, seven punt returns for 52 yards, and one missed field goal return for 33 yards.

Following training camp in 2023, Emilus was an opening day start at wide receiver. In the team's home opener, on June 16, 2023, against the Winnipeg Blue Bombers, he scored his first professional touchdown on a five-yard pass from Trevor Harris. He then scored two more touchdowns in the same game, tying a franchise record for most receiving touchdowns in a game with three. He finished the game with seven catches for 77 yards and three touchdowns. In the season finale against the Toronto Argonauts on October 21, 2023, Emilus put up season-high numbers with seven receptions, 137 yards, and a touchdown to finish with 1,097 yards for the season.

On April 1, 2024, Emilus signed a one-year contract extension with the Roughriders.

== Personal life ==
Emilus was born to parents Anne Rose Emilus and Amel Normill. He has three brothers, Ricardo, Rooldoph and Kenny.
