= Kian Schaffer-Baker =

Canadian gridiron football player (born 1998)

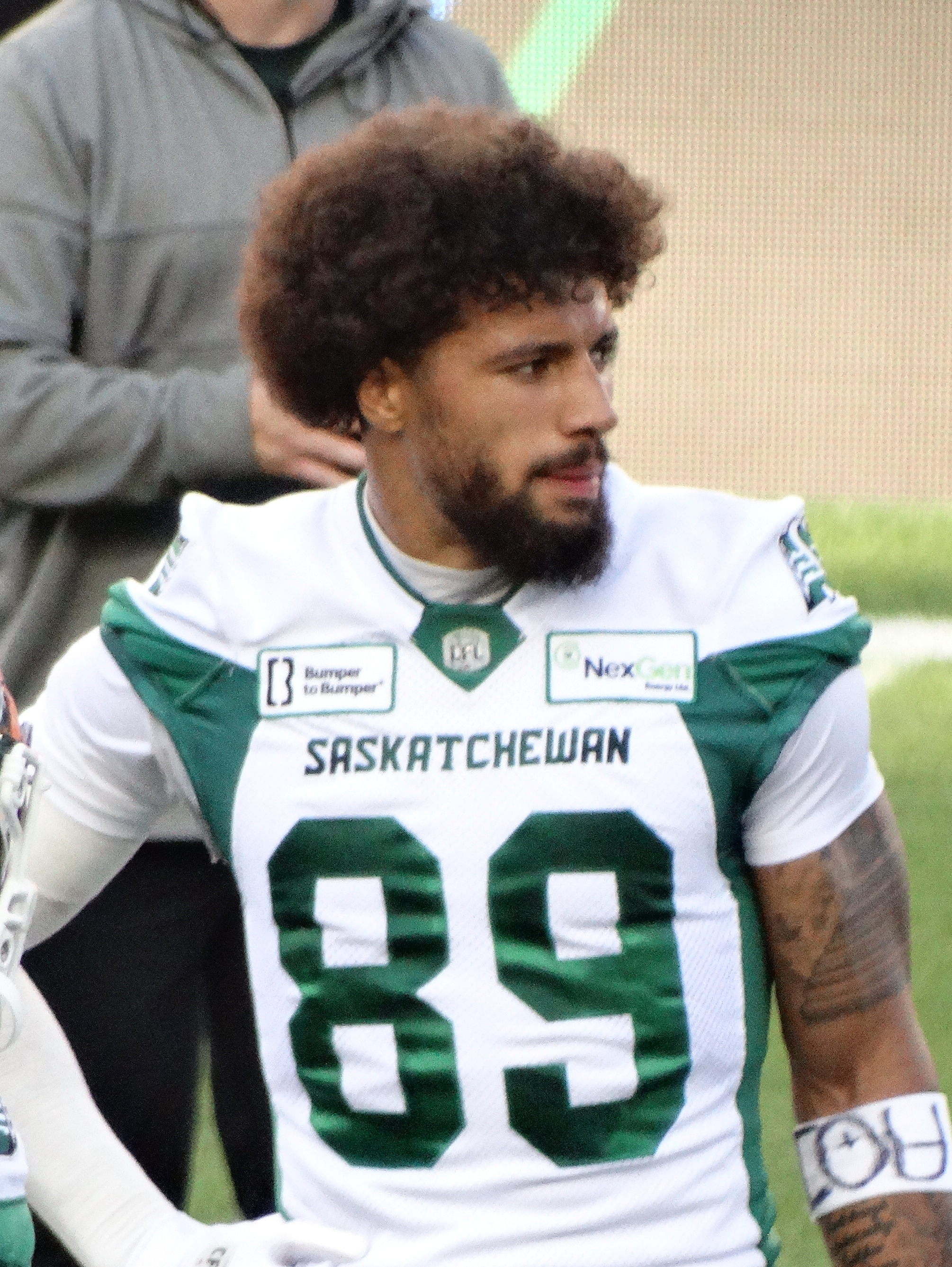
- Schaffer-Baker with the Saskatchewan Roughriders in 2024

No. 89 – Saskatchewan Roughriders
- Position: Wide receiver
- Roster status: 6-game injured list
- CFL status: National

Personal information
- Born: April 28, 1998 (age 28); Mississauga, Ontario, Canada
- Listed height: 6 ft 4 in (1.93 m)
- Listed weight: 195 lb (88 kg)

Career information
- High school: Our Lady of Mount Carmel
- University: Guelph
- CFL draft: 2020: 4th round, 30th overall pick

Career history
- Saskatchewan Roughriders (2021–present)

Awards and highlights
- Grey Cup champion (2025); CFL West All-Star (2026)
- Stats at CFL.ca

Kian Schaffer-Baker (born April 28, 1998) is a Canadian professional football wide receiver for the Saskatchewan Roughriders of the Canadian Football League (CFL).

== Early life ==
Schaffer-Baker attended Our Lady of Mount Carmel Secondary School, where he played high school football.

== University career ==
Schaffer-Baker played U Sports football for the Guelph Gryphons from 2016 to 2019. In the 2019 East–West Bowl, he led all players with five catches for 126 yards and a touchdown. He finished his university career with 28 games played, recording 95 receptions for 1,544 yards, and eight touchdowns.

Guelph Gryphons
Year	GP	Receiving				
Year	GP	Rec	Yds	Avg	Lng	TD
2016	9	22	424	19.3	55	1
2017	10	33	422	12.8	41	1
2018	8	32	504	15.8	46	4
2019	8	23	373	16.2	47	3
Total	35	110	1,723	15.7	55	9

== Professional career ==
Despite recording good testing numbers in the 2020 Ontario Regional Combine, Schaffer-Baker was not invited to the CFL Combine that year for the top ranked players available in the 2020 CFL draft. He was then drafted in the fourth round, 30th overall, by the Saskatchewan Roughriders. However, he did not play in 2020 due to the cancellation of the 2020 CFL season. Instead, it was announced that he had signed his rookie contract with the Roughriders on January 19, 2021.

Following 2021 training camp, Schaffer-Baker began the 2021 season on the Roughriders' practice roster. After an injury to Shaq Evans in week 2, Schaffer-Baker was elevated to the active roster and made his CFL debut against the Ottawa Redblacks on August 21, 2021 where he had four catches for 64 yards. In his fourth game, he scored his first professional touchdown on September 17, 2021 against the Toronto Argonauts after catching a pass from Cody Fajardo and running 24 yards to the endzone for the score. He finished his rookie season with 47 receptions for 563 yards with two touchdowns. Schaffer-Baker continued his strong play into his second season, playing in all 18 regular season games and totaling 68 receptions for 960 yards with five touchdowns. He was named the Roughriders nominee for Most Outstanding Canadian.

Following the 2022 season Schaffer-Baker had workouts with the Jacksonville Jaguars and Pittsburgh Steelers of the NFL. In March 2023, he underwent hip surgery and was expected to miss the start of the 2023 season. On April 12, 2023, the Riders awarded Schaffer-Baker with a new two-year contract extension. According to the terms of his new contract Schaffer-Baker is set make a base salary of $100,000 in 2023, $165,000 in 2024, and $190,000 in 2025 (plus incentives).

After being part of a team that won the 112th Grey Cup championship in 2025, Schaffer-Baker signed another two-year contract extension with the Roughriders on January 19, 2026. On August 6, he was placed on the 6-game injured list.

CFL career statistics
Year	Team	Games		Receiving						Rushing				
Year	Team	GP	GS	Rec	Tar	Yds	Avg	Lng	TD	Att	Yds	Avg	Lng	TD
2021	SSK	12	9	47	63	563	12.0	71	2	1	-8	-8.0	-8	0
2022	SSK	18	18	68	98	960	14.1	85T	5	13	74	5.7	16	0
2023	SSK	9	9	38	55	430	11.3	39	3	2	6	3.0	10	0
2024	SSK	14	14	53	82	735	14.1	81	4	1	-4	-4.0	0	0
2025	SSK	5	5	15	18	177	11.8	27	0	1	1	1.0	0	1
2026	SSK	12	12	68	92	1,033	15.2	56	7	0	0	0.0	0	0
Total		69	65	288	408	3,898	13.5	85T	21	18	69	3.8	16	0
