= Albert Awachie =

Canadian gridiron football player (born 1992)

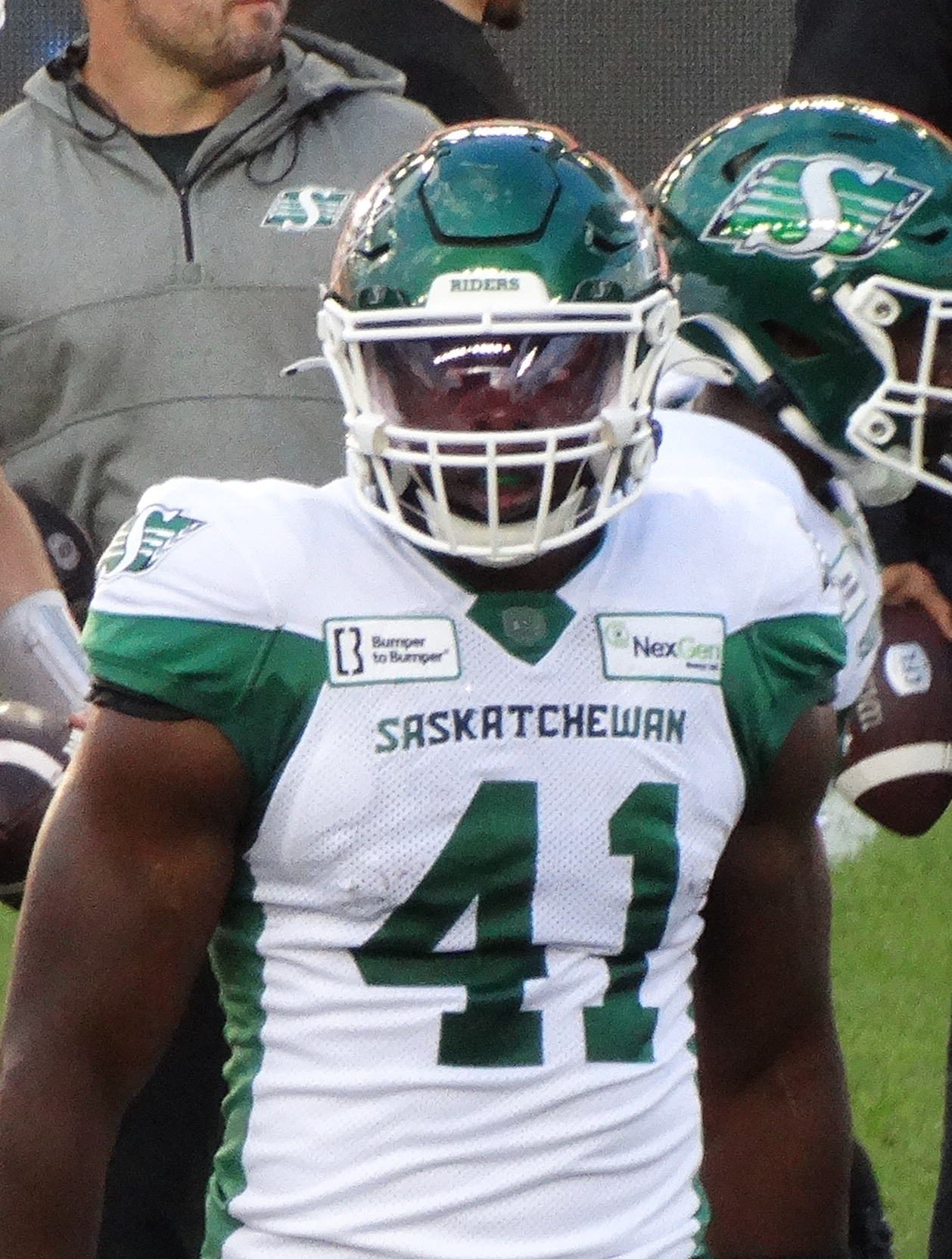
- Awachie with the Saskatchewan Roughriders in 2024

No. 41 – Saskatchewan Roughriders
- Position: Fullback
- Roster status: 6-game injured list
- CFL status: National

Personal information
- Born: October 7, 1992 (age 34); Toronto, Ontario, Canada
- Listed height: 6 ft 3 in (1.91 m)
- Listed weight: 225 lb (102 kg)

Career information
- High school: Rocky Mountain (Fort Collins, Colorado, U.S.)
- University: Toronto
- CFL draft: 2017: undrafted

Career history
- 2017–2023: Saskatchewan Roughriders
- 2024: Toronto Argonauts
- 2024–present: Saskatchewan Roughriders

Awards and highlights
- Grey Cup champion (2025)
- Stats at CFL.ca

Albert Awachie (born October 7, 1992) is a Canadian professional football fullback for the Saskatchewan Roughriders of the Canadian Football League (CFL). He played CIS football for the Toronto Varsity Blues.

== Early life ==
Awachie was born in Toronto, Ontario, on October 7, 1992. Being the youngest of five siblings instilled in him a drive and work ethic that was reaffirmed by his parents, Raphael and Florence, who had emigrated from Nigeria. While in the first grade, he moved to Fort Collins, Colorado to stay with his mother, spending the summers back in Toronto with his father. Although he grew up mostly playing soccer, his older brother Martin invited him to join the football team. He played multiple positions at Rocky Mountain High School, even picking up all-league honors as a defensive lineman. After graduation, he moved back to Toronto.

== University career ==
Awachie played CIS football for the Toronto Varsity Blues from 2013 to 2016, beginning as a wide receiver and later playing some defensive back. Initially joining as a walk-on, he played in 22 games in his college career, registering 14 receptions for 145 yards as well as 22 tackles on defense. He missed the entire 2015 season after he dislocated his knee, tearing the bicep tendon, LCL and ACL, and doctors told him there was a 50 percent chance he would be able to return to football. After ten months of rehab, he was able to come back for his senior season and rank third on the team with 13 receptions and 134 yards.

== Professional career ==
=== Saskatchewan Roughriders (first stint) ===
After going undrafted in the 2017 CFL draft, Awachie signed a free-agent deal with the Saskatchewan Roughriders on May 26, 2017. He made his professional debut in the 2017 season opener on June 22 against the Montreal Alouettes.

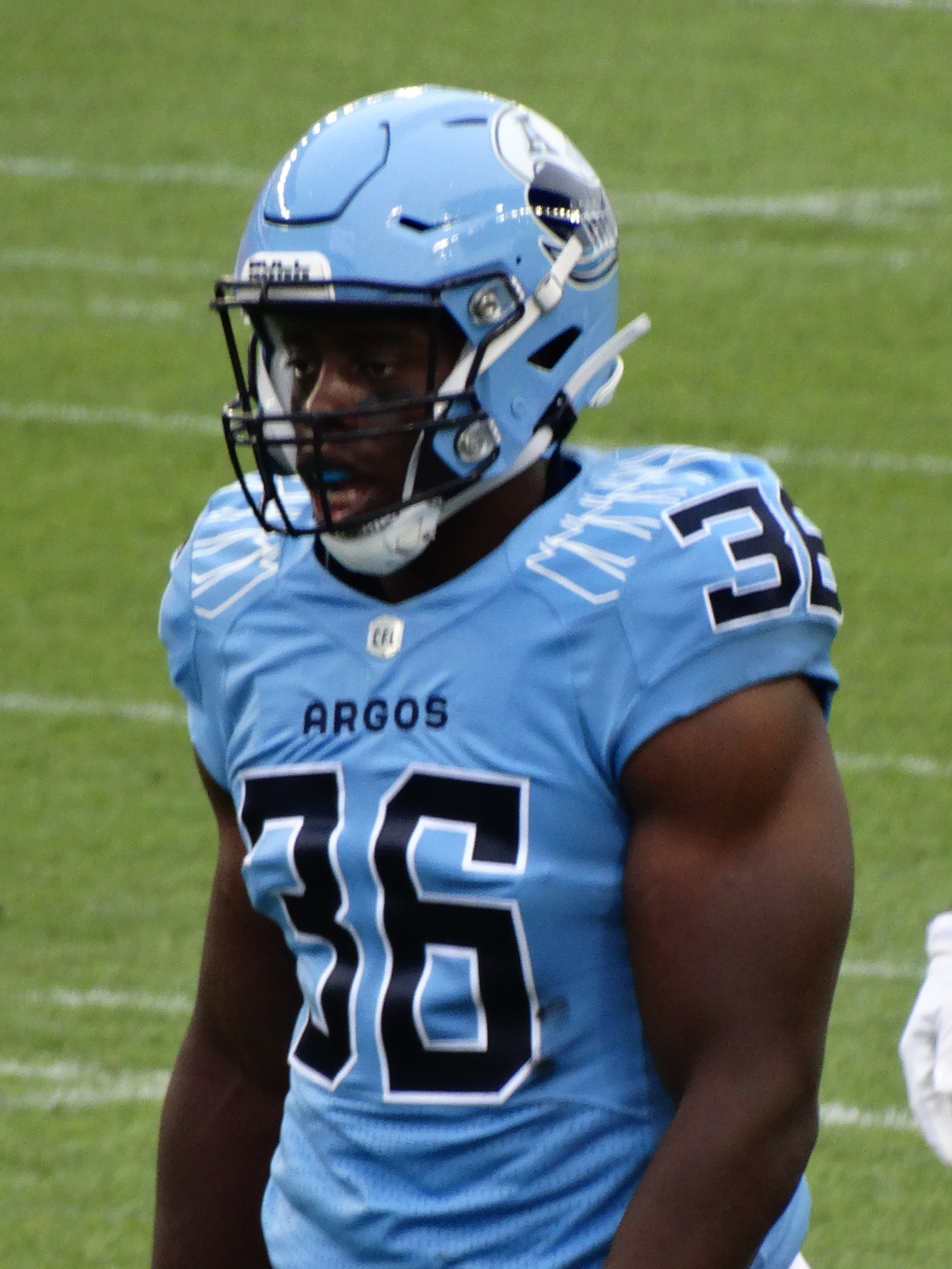
Awachie with the Toronto Argonauts in 2024

Awachie spent his first two years as a backup to fullback Spencer Moore on the depth chart, appearing in 12 games without registering a carry. Bouncing between the active and practice rosters, he also occasionally filled in for injuries on special teams. Moore was traded to the Montreal Alouettes in December 2018, opening the door for more playing time for Awachie. In 2019, Awachie stepped into a larger role on special teams and established himself as a reliable blocker for an offense that ran for over 2,000 yards and a league-best 26 touchdowns. He recorded his first-ever CFL statistic in week 2: a four-yard reception against the Ottawa Redblacks. He got his second catch in week 16, an eight-yard pass from Cody Fajardo against the Toronto Argonauts in Toronto with his parents in attendance.

On January 31, 2020, it was announced that Awachie had signed a two-year contract extension with the Roughriders. However, he did not play in 2020 due to the cancellation of the 2020 CFL season. In 2021, Awachie played in 12 regular season games where he had five special teams tackles and one kickoff return for seven yards. In the 2022 season, he played in a career-high 17 regular season games where he had four receptions for 38 yards, eight special teams tackles, one forced fumble, and one kickoff return for nine yards. In his final season with the Roughriders, Awachie played in 14 games and recorded three catches for 24 yards, one special teams tackle, and two kickoff returns for 25 yards. He became a free agent upon the expiry of his contract on February 13, 2024.

=== Toronto Argonauts ===
On February 13, 2024, it was announced that Awachie had signed with the Toronto Argonauts. He played in seven games for his hometown Argonauts before being released mid-season on August 6, 2024.

=== Saskatchewan Roughriders (second stint) ===
Soon after his Toronto release, Awachie re-signed with the Roughriders on August 7, 2024, and was added to the team's depth chart for their game on the following day.
