= Thomas Bertrand-Hudon =

Canadian gridiron football player (born 1996)

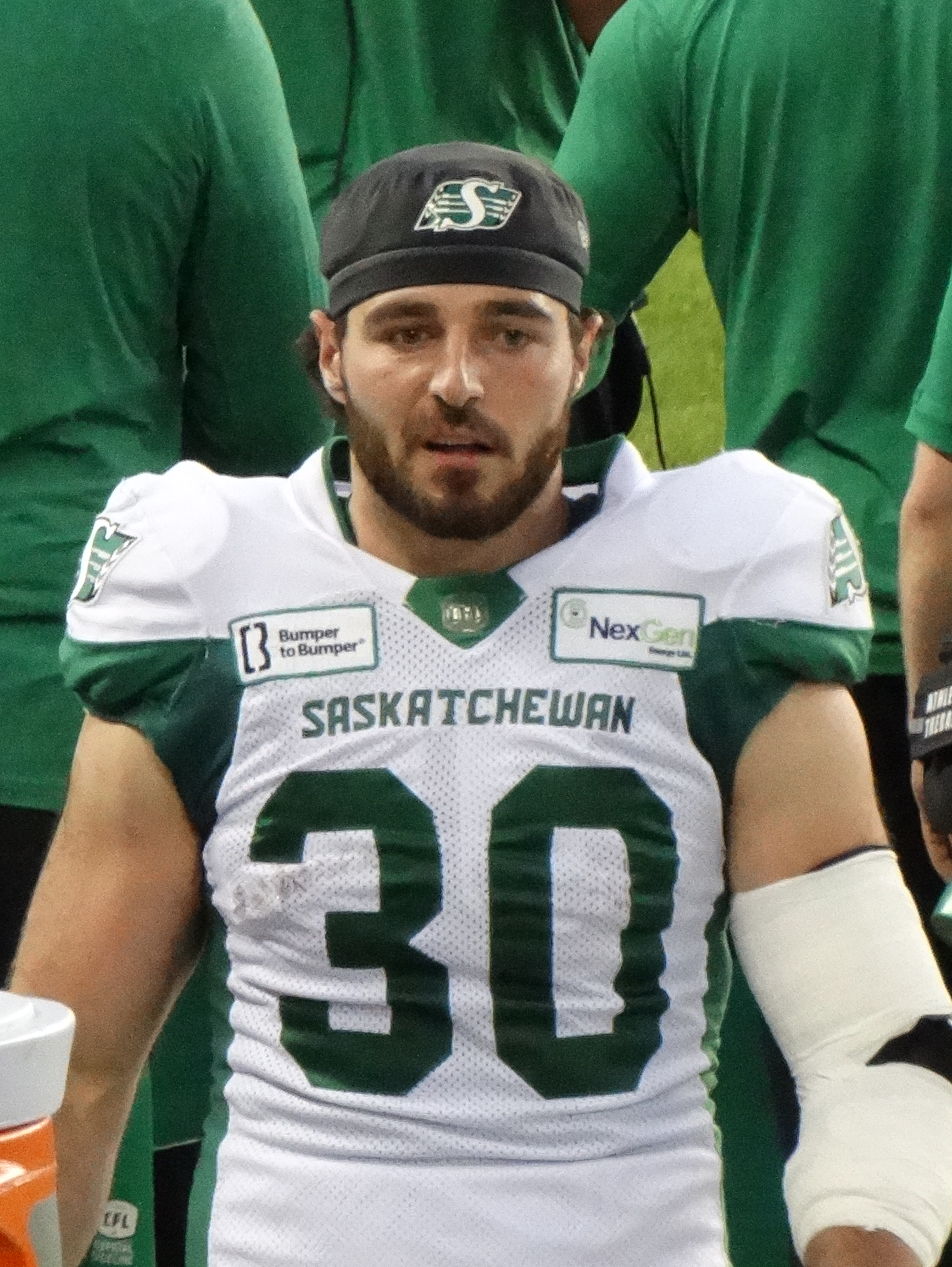
- Bertrand-Hudon with the Saskatchewan Roughriders in 2024

No. 30 – Saskatchewan Roughriders
- Position: Running back
- Roster status: Active
- CFL status: National

Personal information
- Born: October 11, 1996 (age 30); Mont-Saint-Hilaire, Quebec, Canada
- Listed height: 6 ft 0 in (1.83 m)
- Listed weight: 220 lb (100 kg)

Career information
- CEGEP: Champlain College Lennoxville
- College: Delaware State (2018–2022)
- CFL draft: 2023: 4th round, 30th overall pick

Career history
- Saskatchewan Roughriders (2023–present)

Awards and highlights
- Grey Cup champion (2025)
- Stats at CFL.ca

Thomas Bertrand-Hudon (born October 11, 1996) is a Canadian professional football running back for the Saskatchewan Roughriders of the Canadian Football League (CFL). He played college football at Delaware State. He was the first professional football player to wear a Guardian Cap during a regular season game.

== Early life ==
Thomas Bertrand-Hudon was born on October 11, 1996, in Mont-Saint-Hilaire, Quebec. He first played baseball as a child before becoming interested in football. He played high school football and basketball at École Secondaire Saint-Joseph. Bertrand-Hudon then played CEGEP football at Champlain College Lennoxville from 2014 to 2017. He had an 106-yard touchdown run in 2017.

Bertrand-Hudon received walk-on offers to play college football in the United States but no scholarships. He instead enrolled at Carleton University to play U Sports football for the Ravens. However, he never played for the Ravens and was only at Carleton University for a semester. He decided to attend some summer football camps to attract U.S. interest.

== College career ==
Bertrand-Hudon was offered a partial scholarship to attend Delaware State University and play college football for the Delaware State Hornets. He played for the Hornets from 2018 to 2022. He did not appear in any games in 2018. Bertrand-Hudon appeared in eight games in 2019, rushing 111 times for 508 yards and five touchdowns. He played in all five games of the COVID-19 shortened 2020 season, recording 46 carries for 198 yards while also suffering a shoulder injury. Bertrand-Hudon appeared in only three games during the 2021 season before tearing his Achilles. He played in 11 games in 2022, rushing 75 times for 282 yards and five touchdowns.

== Professional career ==
Pre-draft measurables
Height	Weight	40-yard dash	20-yard shuttle	Three-cone drill	Vertical jump	Broad jump
5 ft 11 3/8 in (1.81 m)	227 lb (103 kg)	4.71 s	4.16 s	6.94 s	36.5 in (0.93 m)	9 ft 2 1/4 in (2.80 m)
All values from CFL Combine

At the 2023 CFL Combine, Bertrand-Hudon finished first in the shuttle (4.16 seconds).

He was selected by the Saskatchewan Roughriders of the Canadian Football League (CFL) in the fourth round, with the 30th overall pick, of the 2023 CFL draft. He officially signed with the team on May 8, 2023. Bertrand-Hudon dressed in all 18 games for the Roughriders during his rookie year in 2023, rushing 13 times for 96 yards and two touchdowns, catching two passes for 12 yards, and returning 11 kicks for 268 yards. He also posted ten tackles on special teams. Both of his touchdowns came in the final two minutes of the 33–26 loss to the BC Lions on September 29, 2023.

Bertrand-Hudon was placed on the one-game injured list on July 3, 2024, and activated from the injured list on July 12. On August 16, 2024, against the Montreal Alouettes, he became the first professional football player to wear a Guardian Cap during a regular season game. Bertrand-Hudon was moved to the practice roster on November 8, and placed on the one-game injured list again on November 9, 2024, before the Roughriders' West Final playoff game against the Winnipeg Blue Bombers. He dressed in 17 regular season games overall during the 2024 season, totaling 17 rushing attempts for 103 yards and one touchdown, five kickoff returns for 128 yards, seven special teams tackles, and one forced fumble.

Bertrand-Hudon was placed on the one-game injured list on June 13, 2025, activated from the injured list on June 19, placed on the six-game injured list on July 10, placed on the one-game injured list again on September 26, and activated from the injured list on October 2, 2025. He dressed in six games overall for Saskatchewan in 2025, rushing 34 times for 166 yards and one touchdown while also catching six passes on six targets for 38 yards and one touchdown. On November 16, 2025, the Roughriders won the 112th Grey Cup against the Montreal Alouettes by a score of 25–17.
