= Frankie Hickson =

American gridiron football player (born 1997)

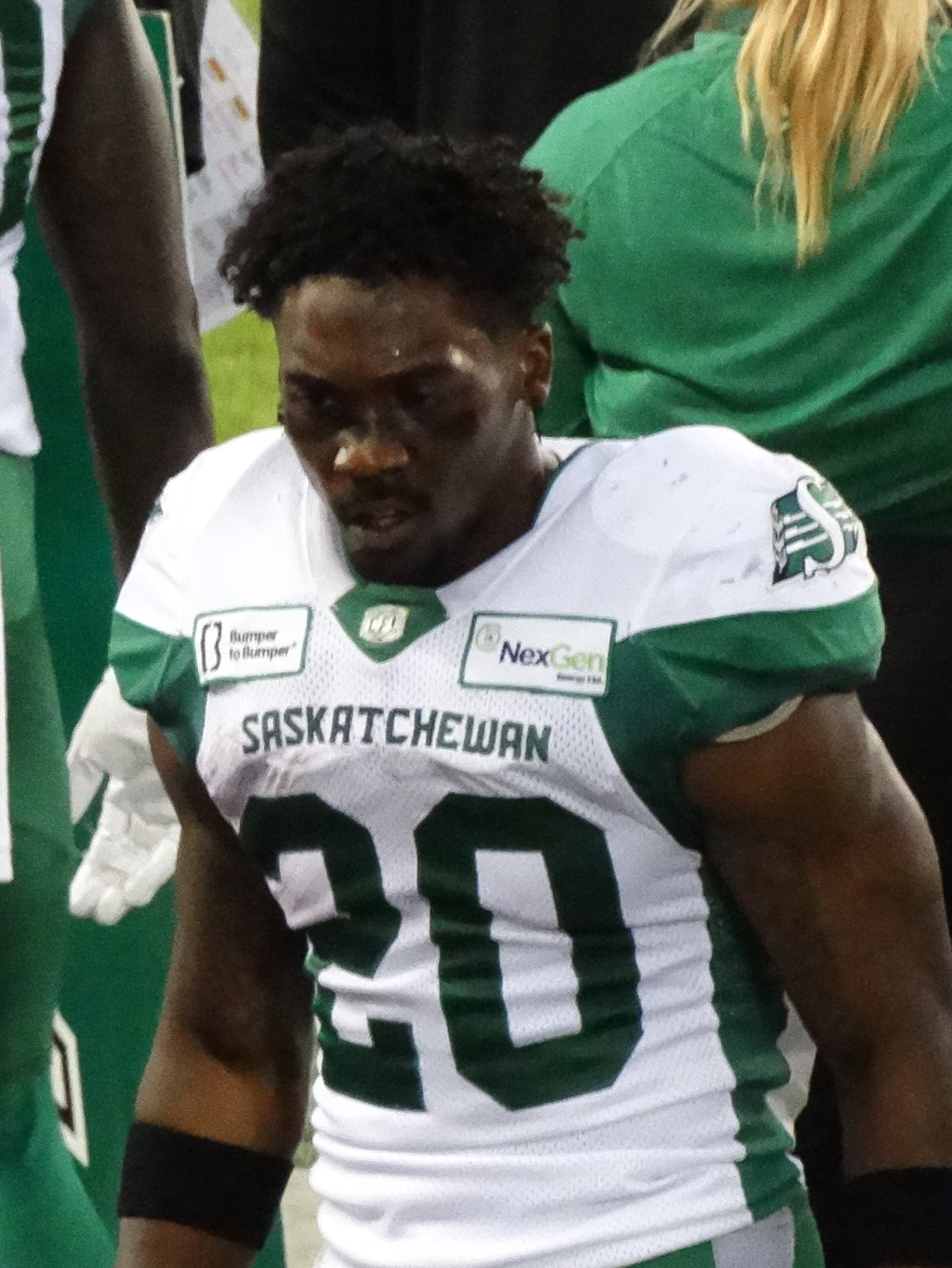
- Hickson with the Saskatchewan Roughriders in 2024

Profile
- Position: Running back

Personal information
- Born: March 17, 1997 (age 29); Lynchburg, Virginia, U.S.
- Listed height: 5 ft 8 in (1.73 m)
- Listed weight: 200 lb (91 kg)

Career information
- High school: Heritage (VA)
- College: Liberty (2015–2019)
- NFL draft: 2020: undrafted

Career history
- Saskatchewan Roughriders (2022–2024)

Career CFL statistics
- Games played: 32
- Rush attempts: 223
- Rushing yards: 1182
- Receptions: 31
- Receiving yards: 248
- Stats at CFL.ca

Frankie Hickson (born March 17, 1997) is an American professional football running back who is currently a free agent. He played college football at Liberty.

== Early life ==
Hickson was born on March 17, 1997, in Lynchburg, Virginia. His father was a football coach for the Liberty Flames from 2004 to 2008. He attended Heritage High School in Lynchburg and posted 4,233 rushing yards with 65 touchdowns, recording 2,169 yards and 37 scores alone as a senior. He was named a first-team selection on the class 3A all-state squad. Hickson committed to play college football for the Liberty Flames over offers from Dartmouth, VMI, Air Force and Navy.

== College career ==
As a true freshman at Liberty in 2015, Hickson redshirted and saw no playing time. In 2016, he played primarily as a return specialist, returning kickoffs for a total of 707 yards, the second-best single-season total in school history. He was named second-team All-Big South Conference for his performance and earned the honor again in 2017 for his special teams contributions.

Hickson moved up Liberty's depth chart at running back in 2018, totaling 1,032 rushing yards and 11 touchdowns on the season. As a senior, he was named honorable mention independent all-conference as he compiled 1,041 rushing yards and 12 rushing touchdowns. Hickson finished his stint at the school with 610 carries for 2,898 yards and 30 scores while playing 47 games, additionally breaking the all-time program record for all-purpose yards with 4,494.

== Professional career ==
Hickson went unselected in the 2020 NFL draft and remained unsigned through the 2021 season. His father was able to get the Saskatchewan Roughriders of the Canadian Football League (CFL) to have him tryout in 2022. Hickson was signed, made the final roster, and became the Roughriders' second-string running back behind Jamal Morrow. In Saskatchewan's week five victory over the Ottawa Redblacks, he ran five times for 92 yards and scored a 63-yard touchdown. After being a backup for most of the season, Hickson was thrust into a starting role after an injury to Morrow in August and tallied 129 rushing yards in his first start, against the BC Lions. He finished the season with 13 games played, four as a starter, and 85 carries for 533 yards with one score, additionally posting 17 receptions for 109 yards.

On February 11, 2025, he became a free agent.
