= Tevin Jones =

American gridiron football player (born 1992)

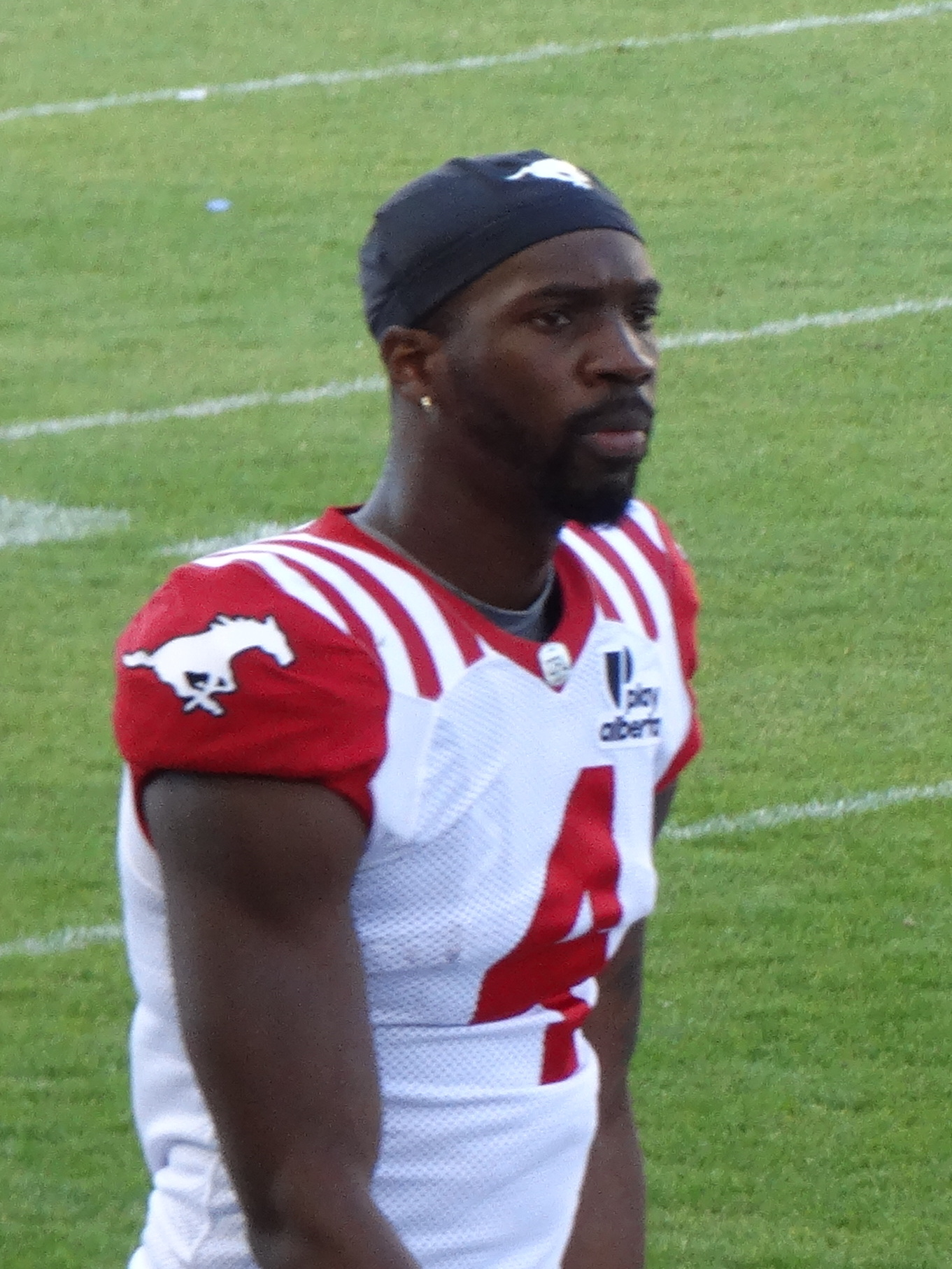
- Jones with the Calgary Stampeders in 2025

No. 4 – Calgary Stampeders
- Position: Wide receiver
- Roster status: Active
- CFL status: American

Personal information
- Born: December 26, 1992 (age 33); Amory, Mississippi, U.S.
- Listed height: 6 ft 2 in (1.88 m)
- Listed weight: 222 lb (101 kg)

Career information
- High school: Clear Creek (League City, Texas)
- College: Memphis
- NFL draft: 2016: undrafted

Career history
- Houston Texans (2016–2017)*; Kansas City Chiefs (2017)*; Pittsburgh Steelers (2018–2019); Dallas Cowboys (2019–2020)*; Saskatchewan Roughriders (2021)*; Jacksonville Jaguars (2021)*; Saskatchewan Roughriders (2022–2023); Montreal Alouettes (2024)*; Edmonton Elks (2024); Calgary Stampeders (2025–present)
- * Offseason or practice squad member only

Career NFL statistics
- Receptions: 4
- Receiving yards: 61
- Stats at Pro Football Reference

Career CFL statistics as of 2026
- Games played: 79
- Receptions: 221
- Receiving yards: 3,280
- Receiving touchdowns: 22
- Stats at CFL.ca

Tevin Terrell Jones (born December 26, 1992) is an American professional football wide receiver for the Calgary Stampeders of the Canadian Football League (CFL). He played college football at Memphis. Jones has also been a member of the Houston Texans, Kansas City Chiefs, Pittsburgh Steelers, Dallas Cowboys, Jacksonville Jaguars, Saskatchewan Roughriders, and Edmonton Elks.

== Professional career ==
Pre-draft measurables
Height	Weight	Arm length	Hand span	Wingspan	40-yard dash	10-yard split	20-yard split	20-yard shuttle	Three-cone drill	Vertical jump	Broad jump	Bench press
6 ft 2 1/8 in (1.88 m)	217 lb (98 kg)	33 3/8 in (0.85 m)	9 7/8 in (0.25 m)	6 ft 5 3/4 in (1.97 m)	4.48 s	1.63 s	2.63 s	4.18 s	6.88 s	36.5 in (0.93 m)	10 ft 5 in (3.18 m)	18 reps
All values from Pro Day

=== Houston Texans ===
Jones signed with the Houston Texans as an undrafted free agent on May 6, 2016. He was waived on August 30, 2016. He was re-signed to the practice squad on December 14, 2016. He signed a reserve/future contract on January 16, 2017. He was waived on May 16, 2017.

=== Kansas City Chiefs ===
On June 6, 2017, Jones signed with the Kansas City Chiefs. He was waived on September 2, 2017.

=== Pittsburgh Steelers ===
On January 29, 2018, Jones signed a reserve/future contract with the Pittsburgh Steelers. He was waived on September 1, 2018 and was signed to the practice squad the next day. He signed a reserve/future contract on December 31, 2018. On August 31, 2019, Jones was waived by the Steelers and signed to the practice squad the next day. He was promoted to the active roster on November 14, 2019. He was waived on December 16, 2019.

=== Dallas Cowboys ===
On December 18, 2019, Jones was signed to the Dallas Cowboys' practice squad. On December 30, 2019, Jones was signed to a reserve/future contract. He was waived on September 5, 2020.

=== Saskatchewan Roughriders (first stint) ===
Jones signed with the Saskatchewan Roughriders of the CFL on April 27, 2021. He was placed on the suspended list on July 3, 2021. He was released prior to the start of the season.

=== Jacksonville Jaguars ===
On July 30, 2021, Jones signed with the Jacksonville Jaguars. He was waived on August 31, 2021.

=== Saskatchewan Roughriders (second stint) ===
On April 21, 2022, the Roughriders announced that Jones had resigned with the team.

=== Montreal Alouettes ===
On February 7, 2024, Jones signed with the Montreal Alouettes along with defensive lineman Isaac Adeyemi-Berglund. He was released on June 2.

=== Edmonton Elks ===
After the first week of the 2024 CFL season, Jones signed with the Edmonton Elks on June 11, 2024. He recorded 40 catches for 731 yards and five touchdowns. He became a free agent upon the expiry of his contract on February 11, 2025.

=== Calgary Stampeders ===
On February 11, 2025, it was announced that Jones had signed with the Calgary Stampeders.
