= Pete Robertson =

American gridiron football player (born 1992)

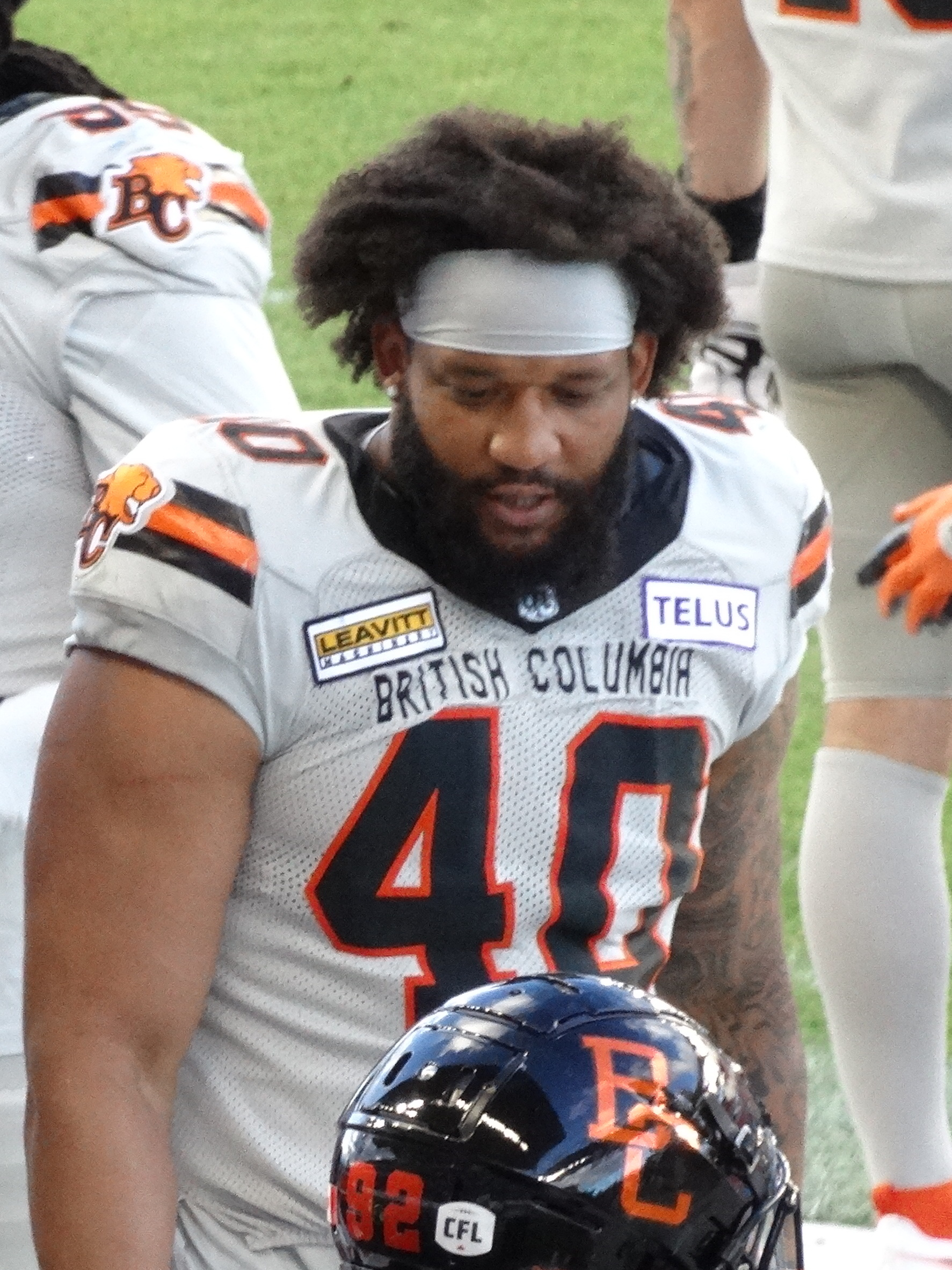
- Robertson with the BC Lions in 2024

Profile
- Position: Defensive end

Personal information
- Born: December 2, 1992 (age 33); Longview, Texas, U.S.
- Listed height: 6 ft 2 in (1.88 m)
- Listed weight: 243 lb (110 kg)

Career information
- High school: Longview (TX)
- College: Texas Tech (2011–2015)
- NFL draft: 2016: undrafted

Career history
- Seattle Seahawks (2016)*; Washington Redskins (2017); Arizona Cardinals (2018–2019); Washington Redskins (2019)*; Saskatchewan Roughriders (2020–2023); BC Lions (2024)
- * Offseason or practice squad member only

Awards and highlights
- First-team All-Big 12 (2014)

Career NFL statistics
- Total tackles: 4
- Stats at Pro Football Reference

Career CFL statistics
- Tackles: 47
- Sacks: 14
- Interceptions: 1
- Forced fumbles: 5
- Stats at CFL.ca

Pete Robertson (born December 2, 1992) is an American professional football defensive end who is currently a free agent. He most recently played for the BC Lions of the Canadian Football League (CFL). He played college football at Texas Tech. He signed with the Seattle Seahawks as an undrafted free agent in 2016. He has also played for the Washington Redskins, Arizona Cardinals, and Saskatchewan Roughriders.

== College career ==
Robertson played linebacker and defensive end at Texas Tech from 2011–2015. In his college career, Robertson played in 47 games with 36 starts, recording 202 total tackles, including 33 tackles for loss and 18.5 sacks. He also recorded 2 interceptions, 8 pass deflections, 7 forced fumbles, and 3 fumble recoveries. Robertson was voted Honorable Mention All-Big 12 in 2013 and 2015, as well as First-Team All-Big 12 as a redshirt junior in 2014, a season in which he started all 12 games, recording 81 tackles, 12 sacks, 3 forced fumbles, 3 pass deflections, and one fumble recovery.

== Professional career ==
=== Seattle Seahawks ===
Robertson signed with the Seattle Seahawks as an undrafted free agent on May 9, 2016. He was waived by the Seahawks on August 30, 2016.

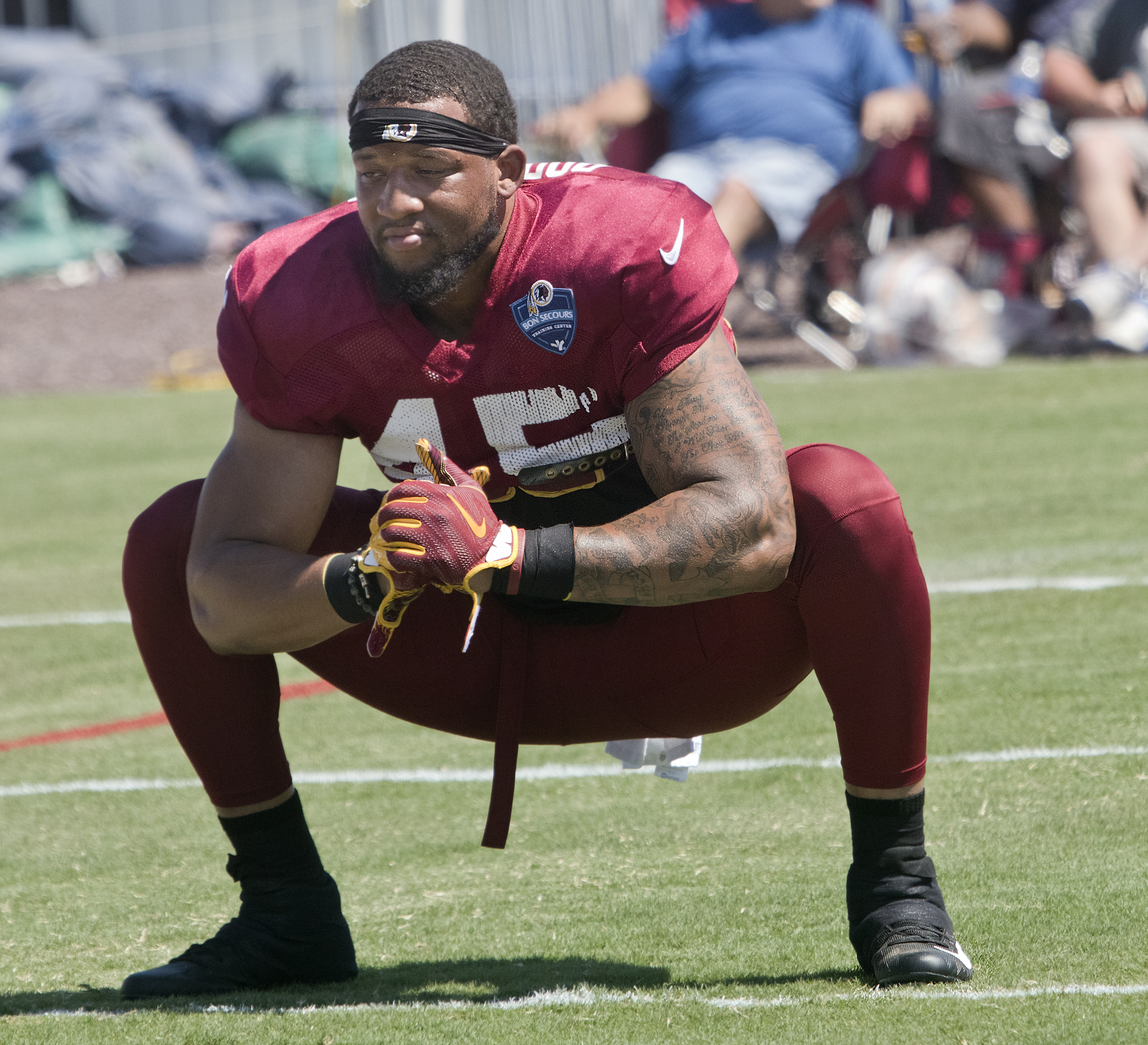
Robertson during Redskins training camp in 2017.

=== Washington Redskins (first stint) ===
After his release from Seattle, Robertson struggled to find another opportunity in football and took a job working overnight shifts at UPS to support his newborn daughter. He eventually landed a workout with the Washington Redskins, and on January 6, 2017, Robertson signed a reserve/future contract with the Redskins. He was waived by the Redskins on September 2, and was re-signed to the practice squad the following day. Robertson was promoted to the active roster on November 21. He was waived by the Redskins on December 4, and was subsequently re-signed to the practice squad. Robertson was promoted again to the active roster on December 12.

On September 1, 2018, Robertson was waived for final roster cuts before the start of the regular season.

=== Arizona Cardinals ===
On December 19, 2018, Robertson was signed to the Arizona Cardinals' practice squad. He signed a reserve/future contract with the Cardinals on December 31.

On September 1, 2019, Robertson was waived by the Cardinals and re-signed to the team's practice squad. On November 8, Robertson was promoted to the active roster. He was waived by the Cardinals on December 3.

=== Washington Redskins (second stint) ===
On December 10, 2019, Robertson was signed to the Washington Redskins' practice squad. His practice squad contract with the team expired on January 6, 2020.

=== Saskatchewan Roughriders ===
Robertson signed with the Saskatchewan Roughriders of the Canadian Football League on February 19, 2020. After the CFL canceled the 2020 season due to the COVID-19 pandemic, Robertson chose to opt-out of his contract with the Roughriders on August 28. He opted back in to his contract on January 7, 2021. Robertson played in 11 regular season games for the Riders during the 2021 season, contributing with 10 defensive tackles, two special teams tackles and five quarterback sacks. The following season he missed four games in the middle of the season with a foot sprain.

The following season, Robertson was re-signed on a one-year contract to stay with the Roughriders for the 2023–24 Season. Late in the fourth quarter of the Labour Day Classic game on September 4, 2023, Robertson head butted Winnipeg Blue Bombers quarterback Zach Collaros, knocking him to the turf. The incident happened after Robertson knocked down a pass and well after the whistle had blown. The next day, the CFL suspended Robertson for one game for his actions. On February 13, 2024, he became a free agent.

=== BC Lions ===
On February 13, 2024, it was announced that Robertson had signed a one-year contract with the BC Lions. Robertson was released by the Lions during the following offseason, on January 6, 2025.

== Personal life ==
Robertson's older god-brother is former Redskins wide receiver Malcolm Kelly. He is also cousins with former Redskins offensive tackle Trent Williams, and has spent offseasons training with Williams and retired NFL running back Adrian Peterson at the gym co-owned by Williams and Peterson.

During the COVID-19 pandemic, Robertson founded a trucking company in his hometown of Longview, Texas to make ends meet while awaiting further opportunities in football.
