= Nicholas Dheilly =

Canadian football player (born 1997)

No. 96
- Position: Defensive end

Personal information
- Born: October 21, 1997 (age 29); Regina, Saskatchewan, Canada
- Listed height: 6 ft 3 in (1.91 m)
- Listed weight: 226 lb (103 kg)

Career information
- High school: Dr. Martin LeBoldus (SK)
- University: Regina (2016–2017); Saskatchewan (2019)
- CFL draft: 2020: 5th round, 46th overall pick

Career history
- 2020–2021: Winnipeg Blue Bombers
- 2021–2024: Saskatchewan Roughriders
- Stats at CFL.ca

Nicholas Dheilly (born October 21, 1997) is a Canadian former professional football defensive end who played in the Canadian Football League (CFL). He played U Sports football at Regina and Saskatchewan and was selected in the fifth round (46th overall) of the 2020 CFL draft by the Winnipeg Blue Bombers.

== Early life ==
Dheilly was born on October 21, 1997, in Regina, Saskatchewan. His brother Dominique also played football. He attended Dr. Martin LeBoldus High School and helped them win three consecutive Saskatchewan High Schools Athletic Association 4A championships. He also played for Team Saskatchewan at the Football Canada Cup and was a member of the Canada national junior football team. A highly-recruited prospect, he committed to play U Sports football for the Regina Rams after flipping his commitment from the Saskatchewan Huskies.

== Amateur career ==
In his debut for the Rams, Dheilly tied the school's single-game sack record with three. He finished the season with 30 tackles, four sacks and an interception, being named the Canada West Universities Athletic Association Rookie of the Year. The following season, he earned league all-star honors after posting 26 defensive tackles and 6.5 sacks. Dheilly left the Rams in 2018 for the Okanagan Sun of the Canadian Junior Football League (CJFL), recording eight sacks on his way to being named a conference all-star.

In 2019, Dheilly returned to U Sports football by committing to the Saskatchewan Huskies, for which he had initially decided to play with in 2016 before changing his mind. In one season there, he tallied 24 defensive tackles, a team-leading 9.5 TFLs and six sacks, as well as one interception. He was named a Canada West All-Star for his performance. Despite having two years of eligibility left, Dheilly opted to declare for the 2020 CFL draft.

== Professional career ==
Dheilly was selected in the fifth round (46th overall) of the 2020 CFL Draft by the Winnipeg Blue Bombers; the 2020 season was cancelled due to the COVID-19 pandemic. He made the team in 2021 and played in four regular season games, recording one tackle on special teams. He was released on November 1.

On November 11, Dheilly was signed by the Saskatchewan Roughriders and was placed on the suspended list. He appeared in no games for the Roughriders in 2021. He was re-signed after the season on December 14. He made the final roster for 2022. Dheilly appeared in seven games during the 2022 season, posting three total tackles before being sidelined by an injury. He returned and made the team for the 2023 season. He announced his retirement on August 1, 2024.

Dheilly came out of retirement to sign with the Dinos de Saltillo of the Liga de Fútbol Americano Profesional (LFA) ahead of the 2026 LFA season.
