= Derrick Moncrief =

American gridiron football player (born 1993)

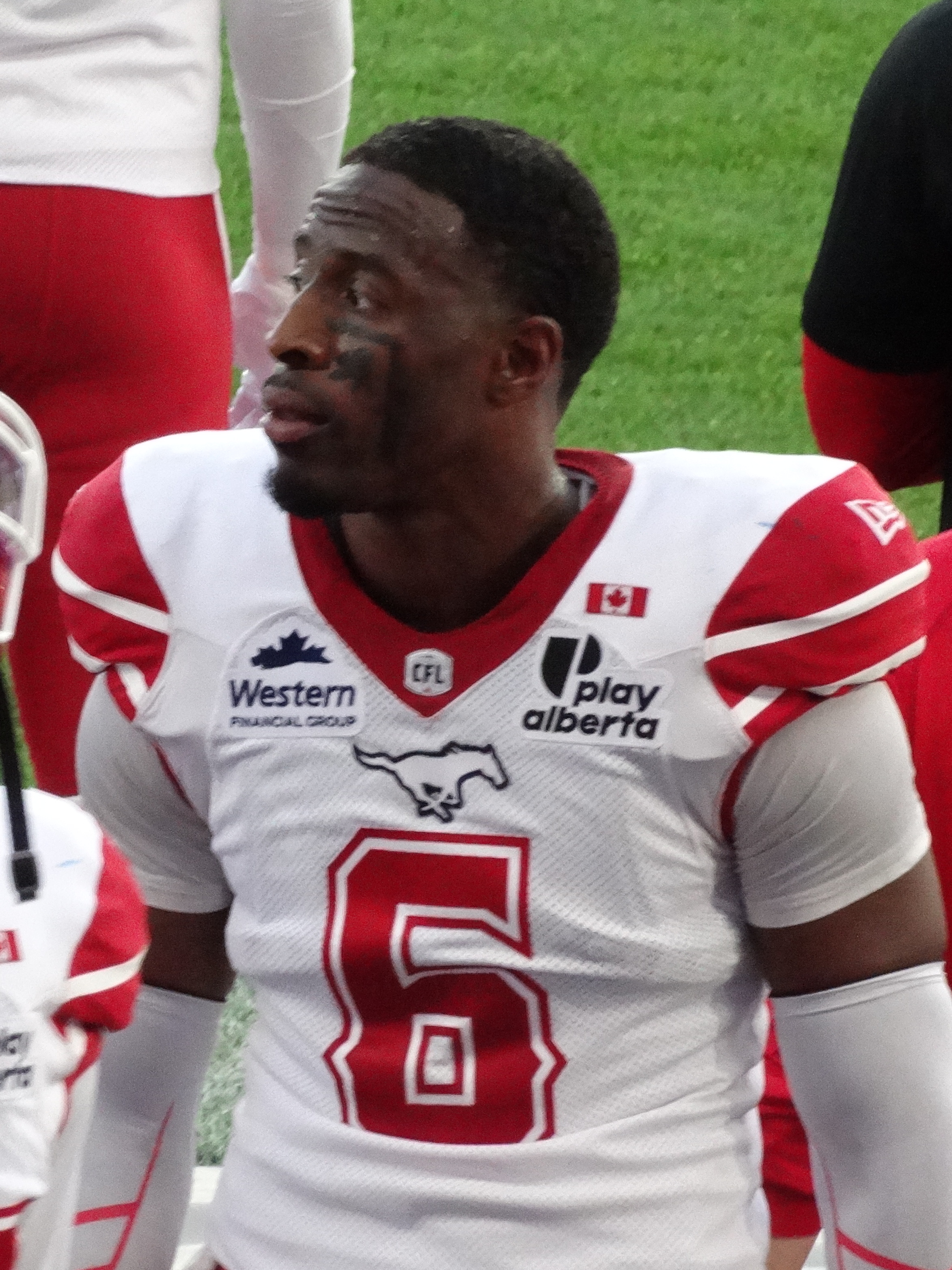
- Moncrief with the Calgary Stampeders in 2026

No. 6 – Calgary Stampeders
- Position: Linebacker
- Roster status: Active
- CFL status: American

Personal information
- Born: June 25, 1993 (age 33); Prattville, Alabama, U.S.
- Listed height: 6 ft 2 in (1.88 m)
- Listed weight: 217 lb (98 kg)

Career information
- High school: Prattville
- College: Mississippi Gulf Coast; Auburn; Oklahoma State
- NFL draft: 2017: undrafted

Career history
- Saskatchewan Roughriders (2017–2019); Las Vegas Raiders (2020)*; Los Angeles Rams (2020); Edmonton Elks (2021); Saskatchewan Roughriders (2022–2023); Edmonton Elks (2024); Calgary Stampeders (2025–present)
- * Offseason or practice squad member only

Awards and highlights
- CFL All Star (2019); 2× CFL West All Star (2019, 2022)
- Stats at Pro Football Reference
- Stats at CFL.ca

Derrick Moncrief (born June 25, 1993) is an American professional football linebacker for the Calgary Stampeders of the Canadian Football League (CFL).

== College career ==
Moncrief played college football for the Mississippi Gulf Coast Bulldogs in 2012 and 2013, the Auburn Tigers in 2014 and the Oklahoma State Cowboys in 2015 and 2016.

== Professional career ==
Pre-draft measurables
Height	Weight	Arm length	Hand span	Wingspan	40-yard dash	10-yard split	20-yard split	20-yard shuttle	Three-cone drill	Vertical jump	Broad jump	Bench press
6 ft 2 in (1.88 m)	215 lb (98 kg)	31 3/8 in (0.80 m)	8 7/8 in (0.23 m)	6 ft 3 7/8 in (1.93 m)	4.55 s	1.53 s	2.66 s	4.52 s	7.25 s	36.5 in (0.93 m)	10 ft 6 in (3.20 m)	16 reps
All values from Pro Day

=== Saskatchewan Roughriders (first stint) ===
Moncrief was signed by the Saskatchewan Roughriders of the CFL on June 3, 2017, and played in his first professional football game on August 13, 2017. He had a career-best 73 tackles in 2019 and was named to the CFL All-Star team.

=== Las Vegas Raiders ===
On January 10, 2020, Moncrief signed a reserve/future contract with the Las Vegas Raiders of the National Football League (NFL). He was waived on May 11, 2020.

=== Los Angeles Rams ===
Moncrief signed with the Los Angeles Rams on August 25, 2020. He was waived on September 4, 2020, and re-signed to the practice squad two days later. He was elevated to the active roster on October 31 for the team's week 8 game against the Miami Dolphins, and reverted to the practice squad after the game. He was placed on the practice squad/COVID-19 list by the team on December 22, 2020, and restored to the practice squad on December 26. He signed a reserve/future contract on January 29, 2021. He was waived on August 17, 2021.

=== Edmonton Elks (first stint) ===
On September 7, 2021, it was announced that Moncrief had signed with the Edmonton Elks. He played in nine games for the Elks where he had 23 defensive tackles and four sacks.

=== Saskatchewan Roughriders (second stint) ===
On February 8, 2022, it was announced that Moncrief had signed with the Roughriders. He was released on January 5, 2024.

=== Edmonton Elks (second stint) ===
On July 7, 2024, it was announced that Moncrief had signed with the Elks. He played in 14 regular season games where he recorded 50 defensive tackles, three sacks, and one interception. He became a free agent upon the expiry of his contract on February 11, 2025.

=== Calgary Stampeders ===
On February 11, 2025, it was announced that Moncrief had signed with the Calgary Stampeders. He played and started in all 18 regular season games where he had 67 defensive tackles, two interceptions, one forced fumble, one fumble recovery, and six pass knockdowns.
