= Kent Maugeri =

American gridiron football coach

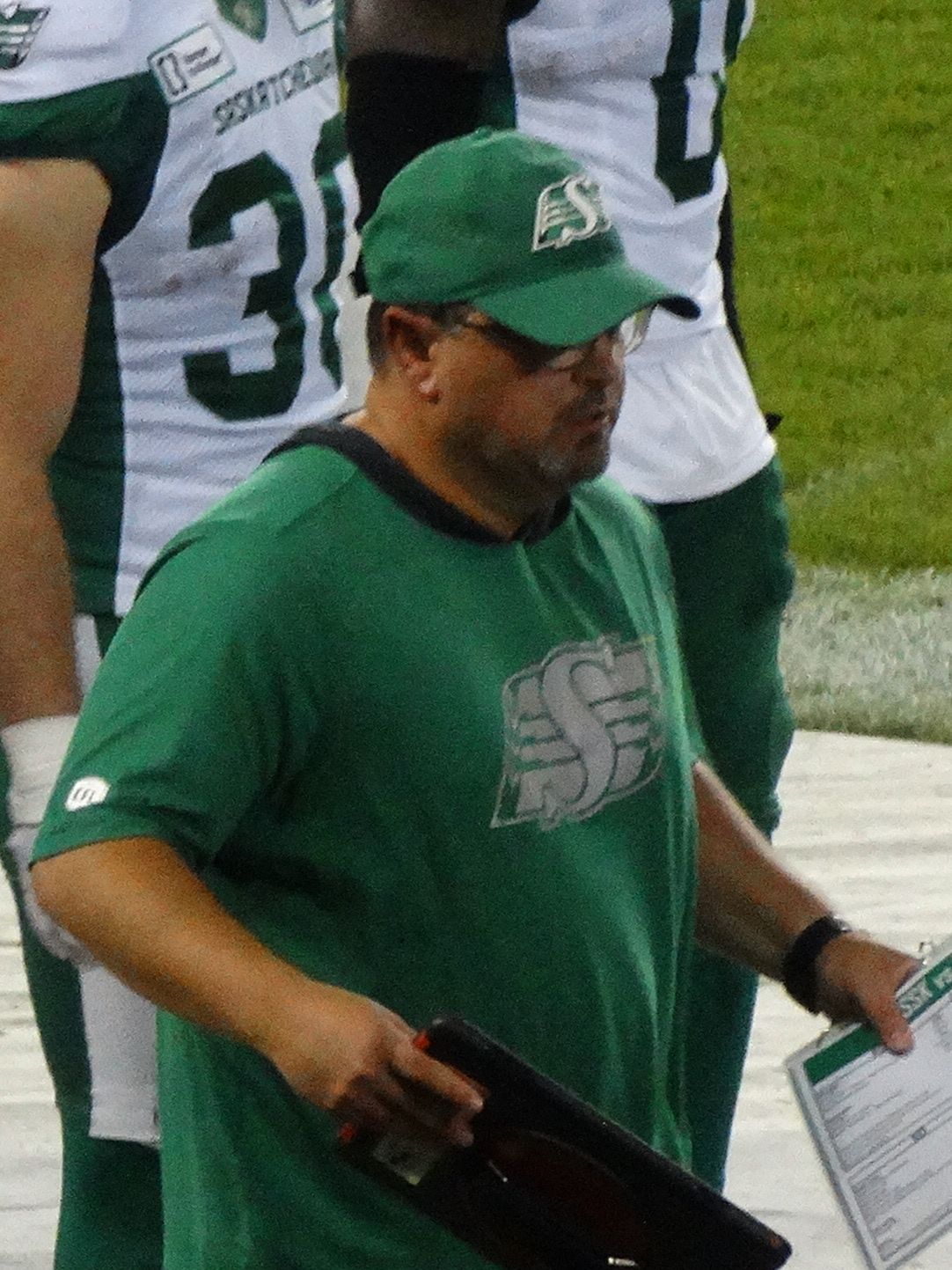
- Maugeri with the Saskatchewan Roughriders in 2024

Saskatchewan Roughriders
- Title: Special Teams Coordinator

Personal information
- Born: Mahopac, New York, U.S.

Career information
- College: Western Connecticut State University

Career history
- 2008: Lindenwood Lions (Graduate assistant)
- 2009–2015: Lindenwood Lions (Special teams coordinator, Secondary coach)
- 2016: Saskatchewan Roughriders (Offensive assistant)
- 2017–2019: Saskatchewan Roughriders (Running backs coach)
- 2020–2021: Saskatchewan Roughriders (Special teams coach)
- 2022–present: Saskatchewan Roughriders (Special teams coordinator)

Awards and highlights
- Grey Cup champion (2025)

Kent Maugeri is an American professional football coach who is the special teams coordinator for the Saskatchewan Roughriders of the Canadian Football League (CFL).

== Early life ==
Maugeri was born in Mahopac, New York, and grew up in Daytona Beach, Florida, where he moved when he was eight years old. He played at quarterback and defensive back in high school. Maugeri was a two time state weightlifting champion at Spruce Creek High School.

== College career ==
Maugeri first played college football for one season for the Marist Red Foxes as a defensive back. He then transferred to Western Connecticut State University to play for the Colonials.He graduated from Western Connecticut in 2004.

== Coaching career ==
=== Lindenwood ===
After coaching and teaching for a couple of years in high school, Maugeri eventually joined the coaching staff of the Lindenwood Lions as a graduate assistant in 2008. He earned a full-time coaching position in 2009 where he coached the secondary and served as the team's special teams coordinator. He also spent time as the Lions' recruiting coordinator.

=== Saskatchewan Roughriders ===
Maugeri was hired by Chris Jones to serve as an offensive quality control coach for the Saskatchewan Roughriders in 2016. In 2017, he was promoted to running backs coach. In 2021, he worked as a special teams coach while head coach Craig Dickenson served as the team's special teams coordinator. However, after one year in that capacity, Maugeri was promoted to special teams coordinator on January 27, 2022. He was retained on Corey Mace's staff for the 2024 season in the same capacity after Dickenson did not have his contract renewed.

== Personal life ==
Maugeri and his wife, Cathy, have three children.
