= Miles Brown (gridiron football) =

American gridiron football player (born 1997)

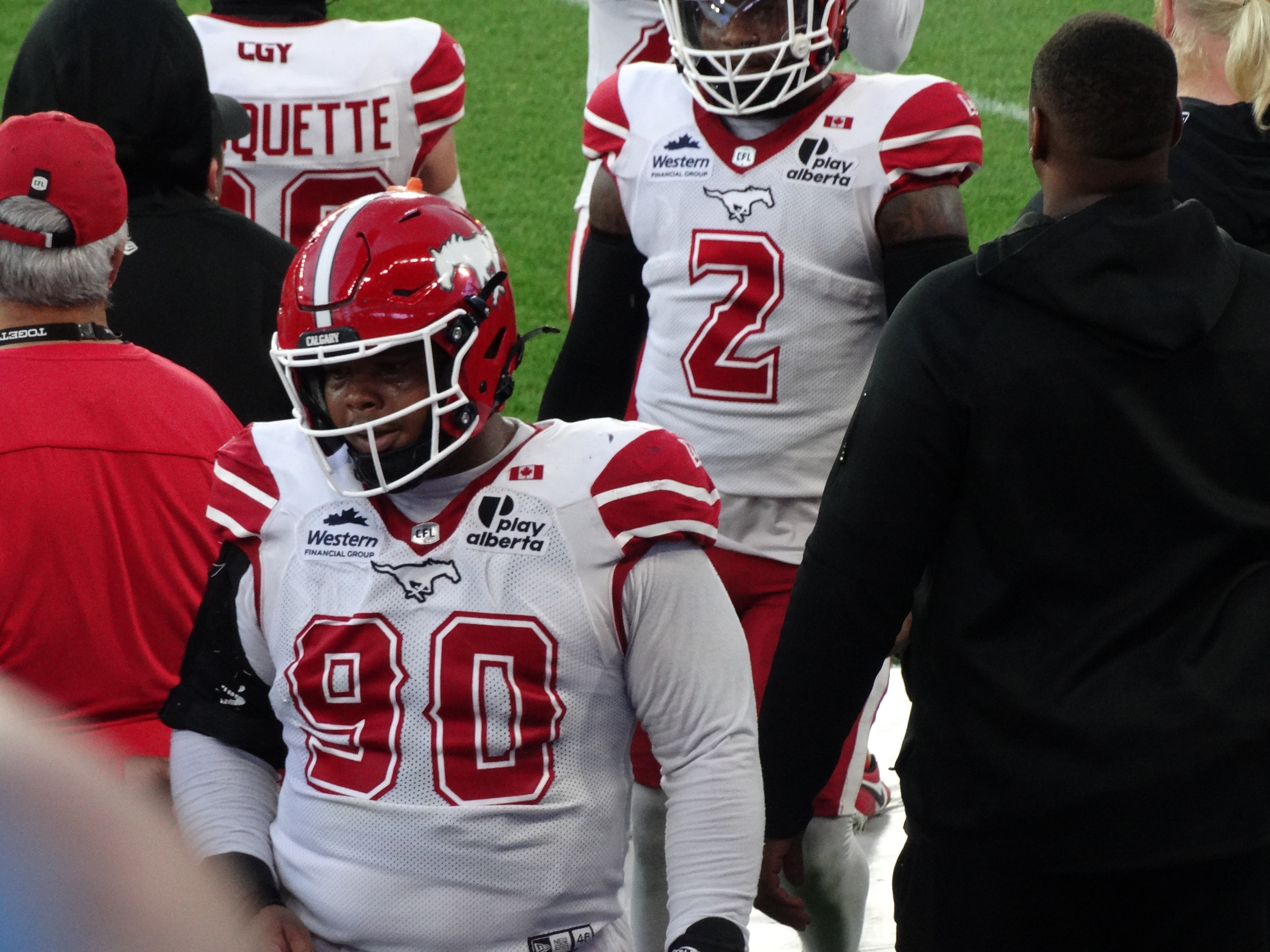
- Brown with the Calgary Stampeders in 2026

No. 90 – Calgary Stampeders
- Position: Nose tackle
- Roster status: Active
- CFL status: American

Personal information
- Born: September 4, 1997 (age 29); Cheverly, Maryland, U.S.
- Listed height: 6 ft 1 in (1.85 m)
- Listed weight: 305 lb (138 kg)

Career information
- High school: Sidwell Friends
- College: Wofford
- NFL draft: 2019: undrafted

Career history
- Arizona Cardinals (2019); Tennessee Titans (2020)*; Detroit Lions (2021)*; Saskatchewan Roughriders (2022–2024); Calgary Stampeders (2025–present)
- * Offseason or practice squad member only

Career CFL statistics as of 2026
- Games played: 76
- Def. tackles: 95
- Sacks: 13
- Stats at CFL.ca
- Stats at Pro Football Reference

Miles Brown (born September 4, 1997) is an American professional football nose tackle for the Calgary Stampeders of the Canadian Football League (CFL). He played college football at Wofford and was signed by the Arizona Cardinals as an undrafted free agent in 2019.

== Early life ==
Brown was born on September 4, 1997, and went to high school at Sidwell Friends School in Washington, D.C., where he started all four years of high school totaling 97 tackles, 12 sacks and two INTs as a senior. He also played Running back in high school in which he totaled 136 carries for 1,012 yards, 22 receptions for 314 yards and 28 total TDs. He also was a member of the wrestling team where he went 23–0 as a junior.

== College career ==
Brown went to Wofford for his college career where in all four seasons he started 49 of 50 played games where he recorded 174 total tackles, recorded 38 tackles for loss and 13.5 sacks in his career. Brown was a first-team All-Southern Conference and two-time third-team All-American selection.

== Professional career ==
Pre-draft measurables
Height	Weight	Arm length	Hand span	Wingspan	40-yard dash	10-yard split	20-yard split	20-yard shuttle	Three-cone drill	Vertical jump	Broad jump	Bench press
6 ft 0 7/8 in (1.85 m)	319 lb (145 kg)	31 1/2 in (0.80 m)	9 3/8 in (0.24 m)	6 ft 2 1/4 in (1.89 m)	5.31 s	1.75 s	3.00 s	4.78 s	8.19 s	23.5 in (0.60 m)	8 ft 1 in (2.46 m)	24 reps
All values from Pro Day

=== Arizona Cardinals ===
After going undrafted in the 2019 NFL draft, he signed with the Arizona Cardinals of the National Football League. After making the Cardinals roster, Brown played in three games before being waived on October 1, 2019, and re-signed to the practice squad. On November 13, 2019, Brown was promoted to the active roster after Zach Allen was placed on injured reserve.

On September 4, 2020, Brown was waived by the Cardinals.

=== Tennessee Titans ===
On November 10, 2020, the Tennessee Titans signed Brown to their practice squad. His practice squad contract with the team expired after the season on January 18, 2021.

=== Detroit Lions ===
On August 6, 2021, Brown signed with the Detroit Lions. He was waived on August 30, 2021, and re-signed to the practice squad, but released the following day.

=== Saskatchewan Roughriders ===
On February 25, 2022, Brown signed with the Saskatchewan Roughriders.

On December 15, 2023, the Roughriders announced that he had signed a contract extension with the team. He became a free agent upon the expiry of his contract on February 11, 2025.

=== Calgary Stampeders ===
On February 12, 2025, it was announced that Brown had signed with the Calgary Stampeders.
