= Amari Henderson =

American gridiron football player (born 1997)

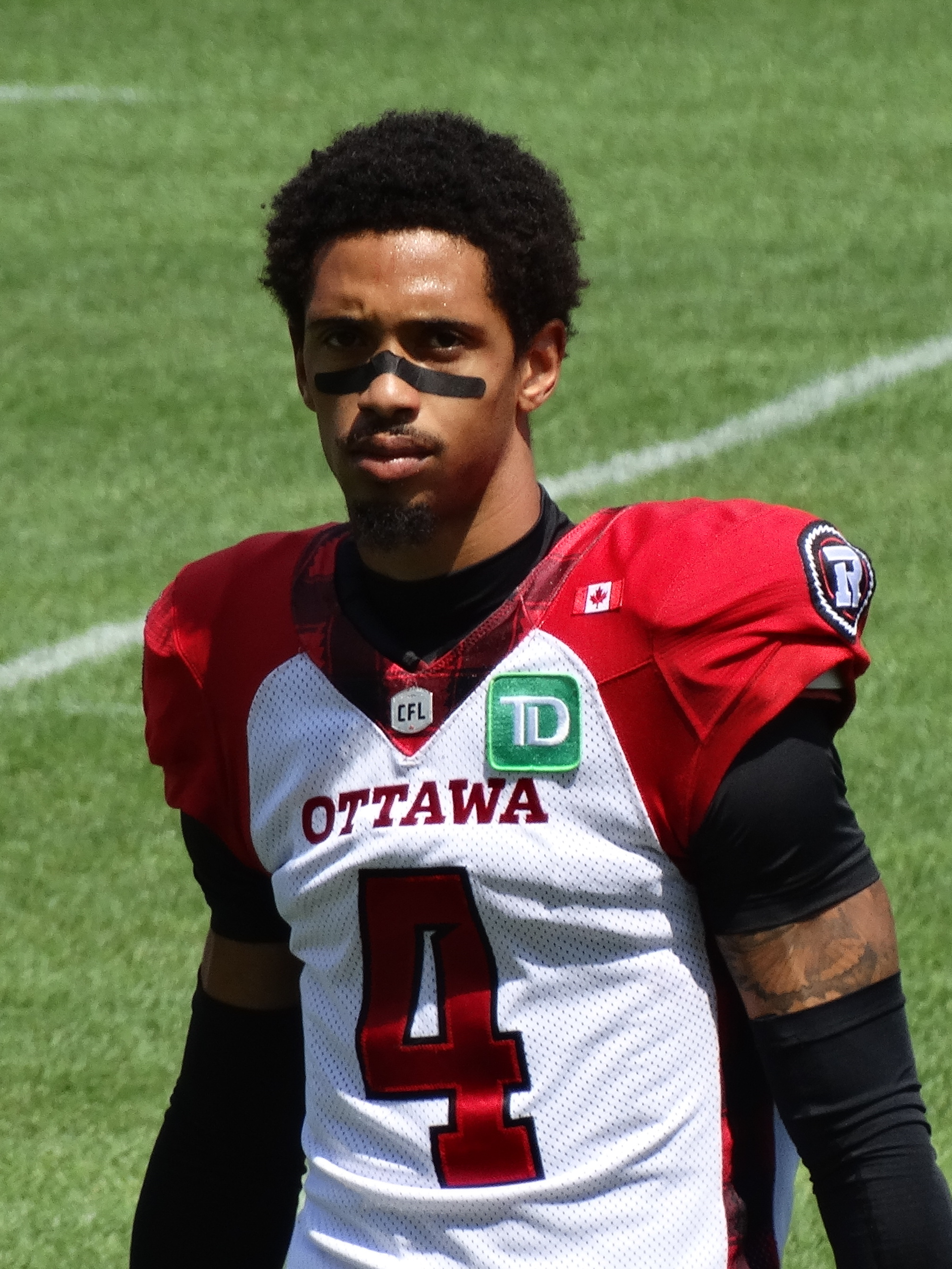
- Henderson with the Ottawa Redblacks in 2025

No. 4
- Position: Defensive back

Personal information
- Born: September 8, 1997 (age 29); Charlotte, North Carolina, U.S.
- Listed height: 6 ft 0 in (1.83 m)
- Listed weight: 182 lb (83 kg)

Career information
- High school: Mallard Creek (Charlotte)
- College: Wake Forest (2016–2019)
- NFL draft: 2020: undrafted

Career history
- 2020: Jacksonville Jaguars*
- 2021: Minnesota Vikings*
- 2022–2024: Saskatchewan Roughriders
- 2025: Ottawa Redblacks
- * Offseason or practice squad member only

Awards and highlights
- Second-team All-ACC (2019)
- Stats at Pro Football Reference
- Stats at CFL.ca

Amari Henderson (born September 8, 1997) is an American professional football defensive back. He played college football at Wake Forest. He has also been a member of the Jacksonville Jaguars and Minnesota Vikings of the National Football League (NFL), and the Saskatchewan Roughriders of the CFL.

== Early life ==
Henderson played high school football at Mallard Creek High School in Charlotte, North Carolina. He recorded 25, tackles, 29 pass breakups and nine interceptions his senior year in 2014, earning AP first-team all-state honors. Henderson also helped lead Mallard Creek to 4AA state championships in 2013 and 2014.

== College career ==
Henderson played college football at Wake Forest from 2016 to 2019. He was redshirted in 2015. He played in 11 games, starting eight, in 2016, totaling 20 tackles, one interception and nine pass breakups. Henderson appeared in 12 games, starting 10, in 2017, accumulating 62 tackles, two interceptions and 12 pass breakups. He played in 10 games, starting nine, in 2018, recording 47 tackles and 10 pass breakups. He started 13 games in 2019, totaling 40 tackles, four interceptions, and 10 pass breakups, earning Phil Steele second team All-ACC honors. Henderson was invited to the 2020 NFLPA Collegiate Bowl.

== Professional career ==
Pre-draft measurables
Height	Weight	Arm length	Hand span	Wingspan
6 ft 0 1/4 in (1.84 m)	170 lb (77 kg)	30 7/8 in (0.78 m)	9 1/8 in (0.23 m)	6 ft 1 1/2 in (1.87 m)
All values from Pro Day

=== Jacksonville Jaguars ===
Henderson signed with the Jacksonville Jaguars of the National Football League (NFL) on April 29, 2020. He was waived on September 6 and signed to the practice squad the next day. He was released by the Jaguars on September 14, 2020.

=== Minnesota Vikings ===
Henderson was signed by the Minnesota Vikings of the NFL on June 8, 2021. He was released on August 17, 2021.

=== Saskatchewan Roughriders ===
Henderson signed with the Saskatchewan Roughriders of the Canadian Football League (CFL) on January 20, 2022. He was moved to the practice roster on June 5, promoted to the active roster on July 1, placed on injured reserve on July 15, activated from injured reserve on July 23, and placed on injured reserve on October 6, 2022. He played in 11 games, all starts, in 2022, recording 31 tackles on defense and one fumble recovery. Henderson started all 18 games in 2023, totaling 45 tackles on defense, one special teams tackle, and two interceptions. He re-signed with the team on December 15, 2023.

=== Ottawa Redblacks ===
On February 11, 2025, it was announced that Henderson had signed a one-year contract with the Ottawa Redblacks.

== Personal life ==
Henderson's cousins Jamal Davis II and CJ McCollum are also professional athletes.
