= Jamal Morrow =

American gridiron football player (born 1995)

Profile
- Position: Running back

Personal information
- Born: January 24, 1995 (age 31); Menifee, California, U.S.
- Listed height: 5 ft 8 in (1.73 m)
- Listed weight: 205 lb (93 kg)

Career information
- High school: Heritage
- College: Washington State
- NFL draft: 2018: undrafted

Career history
- 2019: Orlando Apollos*
- 2019–2023: Saskatchewan Roughriders
- 2024: Ottawa Redblacks
- * Offseason or practice squad member only

Career CFL statistics
- Attempts: 337
- Rushing yards: 1614
- Rushing touchdowns: 7
- Receptions: 82
- Receiving yards: 744
- Receiving touchdowns: 2
- Stats at CFL.ca

Jamal Morrow (born January 24, 1995) is an American professional football running back.

== College career ==
After using a redshirt season in 2013, Morrow played college football for the Washington State Cougars from 2014 to 2017. At WSU he played in 50 games, making 30 starts, and earned All-Pac-12 Conference honorable mention recognition twice. He ranks third in WSU history with 4,219 all-purpose yards and is tied for seventh in WSU history with 23 total touchdowns. He also served as WSU game captain his final 35 games, going 11-4 when calling the coin toss on road games.

== Professional career ==
=== Orlando Apollos ===
After going unselected in the 2018 NFL draft, Morrow had tryouts with the Seattle Seahawks and Tampa Bay Buccaneers, but was not signed by a National Football League team. After not playing football in 2018, he signed with the Orlando Apollos for the 2019 season, but was waived during training camp.

=== Saskatchewan Roughriders ===
On April 15, 2019, Morrow signed with the Saskatchewan Roughriders. At the end of the team's 2019 training camp, he was assigned to the practice roster where he remained for the entirety of the season. He was re-signed by the team on November 28, 2019, but did not play in 2020 due to the cancellation of the 2020 CFL season.

In 2021, Morrow again began the year on the practice roster. However, he made his regular season debut on September 5, 2021, in the Labour Day Classic against the Winnipeg Blue Bombers. In that game, he was used as a return specialist where he had four punt returns for 51 yards, four kickoff returns for 73 yards, and two missed field goal returns for 83 yards, including a longest of 73 yards. He had his first start at running back on November 20, 2021, against the Hamilton Tiger-Cats, where he had nine carries for 41 rushing yards and three catches for 29 receiving yards. Morrow played in eight regular season games, primarily as a kick returner, where he had 26 kickoff returns for 586 yards, 30 punt returns for 330 yards, and six missed field goal returns for 206 yards. He scored his first career touchdown in the team's West Semi-Final playoff game, against the Calgary Stampeders, on November 28, 2021, when he returned a punt 69 yards for the score.

After the Roughriders' incumbent starting running back, William Powell, left the team in free agency, Morrow won the job following 2022 training camp. He had his first career 100-yard rushing game when he had 17 carries for 126 yards and one touchdown on June 18, 2022, against the Edmonton Elks. He also had four catches for 28 yards in that game and was named a CFL Top Performer that week. Morrow played in 12 games for the Riders in his second season in the league, carrying the ball 126 times for 666 yards and three touchdowns. He also caught 43 passes for 366 yards with another touchdown. He missed the second half of the season after requiring surgery on a broken hand. Following the season Morrow and the Roughriders agreed to a one-year contract extension. He became a free agent upon the expiry of his contract on February 13, 2024.

=== Ottawa Redblacks ===
On September 3, 2024, it was announced that Morrow had signed with the Ottawa Redblacks, following the release of the team's incumbent starter, Ryquell Armstead.

== Personal life ==
Morrow was born to parents Vera and Johnnie Morrow. He has one younger brother, Isaiah.
