= 2022 Montreal Alouettes season =

Canadian football team season

- General manager: Danny Maciocia
- President: Mario Cecchini
- Head coach: Khari Jones (1–3), Danny Maciocia (8–6)
- Home stadium: Percival Molson Memorial Stadium

Results
- Record: 9–9
- Division place: 2nd, East
- Playoffs: Lost East Final
- Team MOP: Eugene Lewis
- Team MODP: Adarius Pickett
- Team MOC: Marc-Antoine Dequoy
- Team MOOL: Landon Rice
- Team MOST: Chandler Worthy
- Team MOR: Tyson Philpot

Uniform
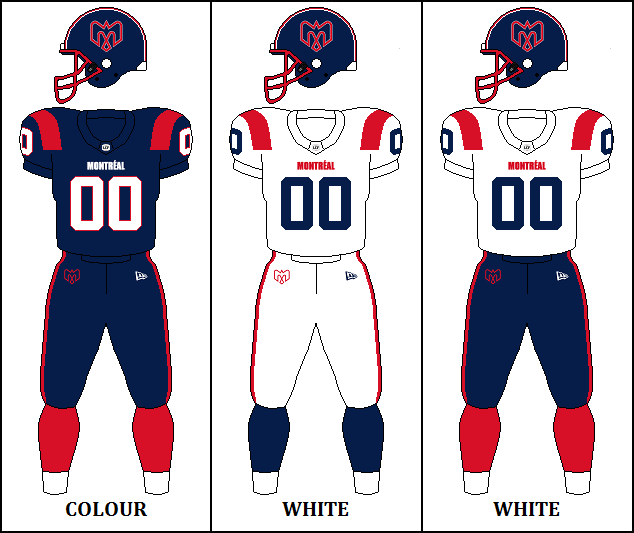

The 2022 Montreal Alouettes season was the 55th season for the team in the Canadian Football League (CFL) and their 67th overall. The Alouettes finished second in their division, an improvement on their third place finish in 2021 and qualified for the playoffs for the third consecutive season following the team's week 19 victory over the Ottawa Redblacks. However, after defeating the Hamilton Tiger-Cats in the East Semi-Final, the team lost to the Toronto Argonauts in the East Final. The Alouettes held their training camp in Trois-Rivières at Stade Diablos.

The 2022 CFL season was the third season for Khari Jones as the team's head coach and offensive coordinator. However, he was fired after four games on July 6, 2022, where the team started with a 1–3 record. He was replaced by the team's general manager, Danny Maciocia, who was entering his second season with the team. The Alouettes also fired their defensive coordinator and defensive backs coach, Barron Miles, on July 6, 2022, and he was replaced by Noel Thorpe, who returned for his third stint with the club.

== Offseason ==
=== CFL global draft ===
The 2022 CFL global draft took place on May 3, 2022. With the format being a snake draft, the Alouettes selected first in the odd-numbered rounds and ninth in the even-numbered rounds.

Round	Pick	Player	Position	University/Club Team	Nationality
1	1	Kingsley Jonathan	DE	Syracuse	Nigeria
2	18	Thomas Odukoya	TE	Eastern Michigan	Netherlands
3	19	Kirk Christodoulou	P	Pittsburgh	Australia

== CFL national draft ==
The 2022 CFL draft took place on May 3, 2022. The Alouettes had the first overall pick for the first time since 1972 following their trade of the fourth overall pick and the playing rights for Carter O'Donnell to the Edmonton Elks. The team also acquired the ninth overall selection from the Winnipeg Blue Bombers after trading Cameron Lawson. In total, the Alouettes had nine selections in the draft.

Round	Pick	Player	Position	School	Hometown
1	1	Tyrell Richards	LB	Syracuse	Brampton, ON
1	9	Tyson Philpot	WR	Calgary	Delta, BC
2	18	Rodeem Brown	OL	Alberta	Halifax, NS
3	24	Vincent Forbes-Mombleau	WR	Laval	Sainte-Marthe-sur-le-Lac, QC
4	33	Tysen-Otis Copeland	DB	Montreal	Montreal, QC
5	42	Ryth-Jean Giraud	RB	Montreal	Laval, QC
6	51	Peter Kozushka	OL	Alberta	Yorkton, SK
7	60	Yanis Chihat	LB	Laval	Quebec City, QC
8	69	Zach Lindley	LB	Western	Chatham, ON

== Preseason ==
=== Schedule ===
Week	Game	Date	Kickoff	Opponent	Results		TV	Venue	Attendance	Summary
Week	Game	Date	Kickoff	Opponent	Score	Record	TV	Venue	Attendance	Summary
A	1	Sat, May 28	7:00 p.m. EDT	at Hamilton Tiger-Cats	L 23–25	0–1	None	Tim Hortons Field	N/A	Recap
B	2	Fri, June 3	7:00 p.m. EDT	vs. Ottawa Redblacks	W 27–26	1–1	TSN/RDS	Molson Stadium	11,273	Recap

# Games played with blue uniforms.

== Regular season ==
=== Standings ===
East Division
Team	GP	W	L	T	Pts	PF	PA	Div	Stk	
Toronto Argonauts	18	11	7	0	22	443	415	7–3	L1	Details
Montreal Alouettes	18	9	9	0	18	471	466	5–5	W1	Details
Hamilton Tiger-Cats	18	8	10	0	16	421	473	5–5	W4	Details
Ottawa Redblacks	18	4	14	0	8	370	475	3–7	L3	Details

=== Schedule ===
Week	Game	Date	Kickoff	Opponent	Results		TV	Venue	Attendance	Summary
Week	Game	Date	Kickoff	Opponent	Score	Record	TV	Venue	Attendance	Summary
1	1	Thu, June 9	9:00 p.m. EDT	at Calgary Stampeders	L 27–30	0–1	TSN/RDS	McMahon Stadium	21,139	Recap
2	2	Thu, June 16	7:30 p.m. EDT	at Toronto Argonauts	L 19–20	0–2	TSN/RDS/ESPN2	BMO Field	12,498	Recap
3	3	Thu, Jun 23	7:30 p.m. EDT	vs. Saskatchewan Roughriders	W 37–13	1–2	TSN/RDS	Molson Stadium	16,027	Recap
4	4	Sat, July 2	7:00 p.m. EDT	at Saskatchewan Roughriders	L 20–41	1–3	TSN/RDS/ESPN2	Mosaic Stadium	27,717	Recap
5	Bye									
6	5	Thu, July 14	7:30 p.m. EDT	vs. Edmonton Elks	L 31–32	1–4	TSN/RDS/ESPN2	Molson Stadium	16,128	Recap
7	6	Thu, July 21	7:00 p.m. EDT	at Ottawa Redblacks	W 40–33	2–4	TSN/RDS	TD Place Stadium	21,537	Recap
8	7	Thu, Jul 28	7:30 p.m. EDT	at Hamilton Tiger-Cats	L 17–24	2–5	TSN/RDS	Tim Hortons Field	20,932	Recap
9	8	Thu, Aug 4	7:30 p.m. EDT	vs. Winnipeg Blue Bombers	L 24–38	2–6	TSN/RDS	Molson Stadium	17,093	Recap
10	9	Thu, Aug 11	8:30 p.m. EDT	at Winnipeg Blue Bombers	W 20–17 (OT)	3–6	TSN/RDS	IG Field	31,053	Recap
11	10	Sat, Aug 20	4:00 p.m. EDT	vs. Hamilton Tiger-Cats	W 29–28	4–6	TSN/RDS	Molson Stadium	21,024	Recap
12	Bye									
13	11	Fri, Sept 2	7:30 p.m. EDT	vs. Ottawa Redblacks	L 24–38	4–7	TSN/RDS	Molson Stadium	15,303	Recap
14	12	Fri, Sep 9	7:30 p.m. EDT	vs. BC Lions	W 31–10	5–7	TSN/RDS	Molson Stadium	15,511	Recap
15	Bye									
16	13	Fri, Sept 23	7:30 p.m. EDT	vs. Hamilton Tiger-Cats	W 23–16	6–7	TSN/RDS/ESPN2	Molson Stadium	17,008	Recap
17	14	Sat, Oct 1	4:00 p.m. EDT	at Edmonton Elks	W 25–18	7–7	TSN/RDS	Commonwealth Stadium	24,201	Recap
18	15	Mon, Oct 10	1:00 p.m. EDT	vs. Ottawa Redblacks	L 18–24	7–8	TSN/RDS/ESPN2	Molson Stadium	21,824	Recap
19	16	Fri, Oct 14	7:00 p.m. EDT	at Ottawa Redblacks	W 34–30	8–8	TSN/RDS	TD Place Stadium	18,147	Recap
20	17	Sat, Oct 22	4:00 p.m. EDT	vs. Toronto Argonauts	L 23–24	8–9	TSN/RDS	Molson Stadium	19,226	Recap
21	18	Sat, Oct 29	2:00 p.m. EDT	at Toronto Argonauts	W 38–33	9–9	TSN/RDS	BMO Field	13,155	Recap

# Games played with white uniforms.
# Games played with blue uniforms.

== Post-season ==
=== Schedule ===
Game	Date	Kickoff	Opponent	Results		TV	Venue	Attendance	Summary
Game	Date	Kickoff	Opponent	Score	Record	TV	Venue	Attendance	Summary
East Semi-Final	Sun, Nov 6	1:00 p.m. EST	vs. Hamilton Tiger-Cats	W 28–17	1–0	TSN/RDS	Molson Stadium	20,693	Recap
East Final	Sun, Nov 13	1:00 p.m. EST	at Toronto Argonauts	L 27–34	1–1	TSN/RDS	BMO Field	21,331	Recap

# Games played with white uniforms.
# Games played with blue uniforms.

== Roster ==
2022 Montreal Alouettes final roster
**Quarterbacks**: 17 Davis Alexander; 4 Dominique Davis; 7 Trevor Harris; **Running backs**: 20 Jeshrun Antwi; 25 Walter Fletcher; 34 Alexandre Gagné; 31 William Stanback; **Receivers**: 83 Régis Cibasu; 11 Kaion Julien-Grant; 87 Geno Lewis; 81 Tyson Philpot; 80 Cole Spieker; 9 Jake Wieneke; 30 Chandler Worthy	**Offensive linemen**: 66 David Brown C/T; 62 Nick Callender T; 60 Patrick Davis G/C; 53 Philippe Gagnon G; 68 Pier-Olivier Lestage G; 51 Kristian Matte G; 55 Landon Rice T; **Defensive linemen**: 99 Jamal Davis DE; 91 Vincent Desjardins DT; 98 Brock Gowanlock DE; 94 Mustafa Johnson DT; 44 Mike Moore DE/DT; 90 Almondo Sewell DT; 10 Nick Usher DE	**Linebackers**: 21 Chris Ackie; 26 Tyrice Beverette; 33 Keishawn Bierria; 49 Frédéric Chagnon; 0 Brian Harelimana; **Defensive backs**: 24 Marc-Antoine Dequoy; 45 Kenneth Durden; 41 Kerfalla Exumé; 8 Mike Jones; 18 Zach Lindley; 23 Nafees Lyon; 12 Najee Murray; 6 Adarius Pickett; 37 Wes Sutton	**Special teams**: 35 Pierre-Luc Caron LS; 15 David Côté K; 36 Joseph Zema P; **Practice roster**: 32 Treshaun Abrahams-Webster DB; 43 Nick Heninger DE; 85 Jon'Vea Johnson WR; 88 Kevin Kaya WR; 61 Jamar McGloster T; 65 Jakub Szott G; 72 Joel Whitford P	**Injured list**: 2 Micah Awe LB; 95 Thomas Costigan DE; 93 Jabari Ellis DT; 64 Sean Jamieson C; 82 Mike Jones WR; 1 Hergy Mayala WR; 5 Greg Reid DB; 42 Tyrell Richards LB; 54 Chris Schleuger T; 47 Ranthony Texada DB; 96 Michael Wakefield DT; 84 Reggie White Jr. SB; 16 Raheem Wilson DB; **Suspended list**: 29 Cameron Artis-Payne RB; 67 Brian Fineanganofo T; 68 Tyler Roemer T; 43 Ahmad Thomas LB
Italics indicate American player • **Bold** indicates Global player

== Coaching staff ==
Montreal Alouettes staff
Front office: Owner – S and S Sportsco (Gary Stern); President/CEO – Mario Cecchini; General Manager – Danny Maciocia; Senior Director of Football Operations – Éric Deslauriers; Director of Pro Personnel – Jean-Marc Edmé; Director of National Scouting – Pier-Yves Lavergne; Director of Player Personnel – Byron Archambault; Head Video Coordinator – Rico Morotti; Head coach: Head Coach – Danny Maciocia; Assistant Head Coach – André Bolduc; Offensive coaches: Offensive Coordinator – Vacant; Quarterbacks – Anthony Calvillo; Offensive Line – Luc Brodeur-Jourdain; Receivers – Michael Lionello; Running Backs – André Bolduc	Defensive coaches: Defensive Coordinator & Defensive Backs – Noel Thorpe; Linebackers – Byron Archambault; Defensive Line – Greg Quick; Defensive Assistant – David Deschamps; Special teams coaches: Special Teams Coordinator – Byron Archambault; Special Teams Assistant – David Deschamps; Staff: Equipment Manager – David Deschamps; Assistant Equipment Manager – Dominic Manno; Head Athletic Therapist – Tristan Castonguay; Assistant Athletic Therapist - Dillon Warren; → Coaching staff
