= 2022 Ottawa Redblacks season =

CFL team season

- General manager: Shawn Burke
- Head coach: Paul LaPolice (3–11), Bob Dyce (1–3)
- Home stadium: TD Place Stadium

Results
- Record: 4–14
- Division place: 4th, East
- Playoffs: Did not qualify
- Team MOP: Lorenzo Mauldin IV
- Team MODP: Lorenzo Mauldin IV
- Team MOC: Nate Behar
- Team MOOL: Jacob Ruby
- Team MOST: Louis-Philippe Bourassa
- Team MOR: Devonte Williams

Uniform
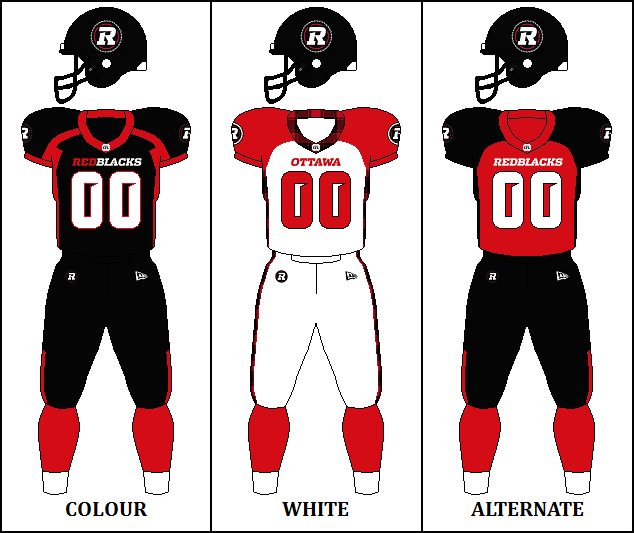

The 2022 Ottawa Redblacks season was the eighth season for the team in the Canadian Football League (CFL). The Redblacks were eliminated from playoff contention following their week 20 loss to the Hamilton Tiger-Cats on October 21, 2022.

The 2022 CFL season was the second season for Paul LaPolice as the team's head coach, but he was fired after leading the team to another 3–11 record. The team had also won just one home game out of 14 tries with LaPolice as head coach, including an 0–7 record in 2022. Bob Dyce, the team's special teams coordinator, was named the interim head coach on October 1, 2022.

This was Shawn Burke's first season as general manager, following the dismissal of Marcel Desjardins who had been in the role since 2013, the year prior to the Redblacks' inaugural season.

== Offseason ==
=== CFL global draft ===
The 2022 CFL global draft took place on May 3, 2022. With the format being a snake draft, the Redblacks selected eighth in the odd-numbered rounds and second in the even-numbered rounds.

Round	Pick	Player	Position	University/Club Team	Nationality
1	8	Héctor Zepeda	OL	Borregos Salvajes Monterrey	Mexico
2	11	Edris Jean Alphonse	DB	Laval	France
3	26	Gabriel Ballinas	K	Albany State	Mexico

== CFL national draft ==
The 2022 CFL draft took place on May 3, 2022. The Redblacks had nine selections in the eight-round draft, including a territorial selection in second round. The team had the second selection in each round of the draft after finishing second-last in the 2021 league standings.

Round	Pick	Player	Position	School	Hometown
1	2	Zach Pelehos	OL	Ottawa	Gananoque, ON
2	11	Cyrille Hogan-Saindon	OL	Laval	Quebec City, QC
2	20T	Jesse Luketa	LB	Penn State	Ottawa, ON
3	22	Keaton Bruggeling	WR	Carleton	St. Catharines, ON
4	31	Daniel Valente	DB	Western	London, ON
5	40	Woodly Appolon	LB	Tuskegee	Montreal, QC
6	49	Subomi Oyesoro	LB	Calgary	Calgary, AB
7	58	Connor Ross	TE	St. Francis Xavier	Coldbrook, NS
8	67	Luca Perrier	RB	Laval	Port-au-Prince, Haiti

== Preseason ==
=== Schedule ===
Week	Game	Date	Kickoff	Opponent	Results		TV	Venue	Attendance	Summary
Week	Game	Date	Kickoff	Opponent	Score	Record	TV	Venue	Attendance	Summary
A	1	Fri, May 27	7:30 p.m. EDT	vs. Toronto Argonauts	W 23–17	1–0	TSN	TD Place Stadium	N/A	Recap
B	2	Fri, June 3	7:00 p.m. EDT	at Montreal Alouettes	L 26–27	1–1	TSN/RDS	Molson Stadium	11,273	Recap

# Games played with white uniforms.

== Regular season ==
=== Standings ===
East Division
Team	GP	W	L	T	Pts	PF	PA	Div	Stk	
Toronto Argonauts	18	11	7	0	22	443	415	7–3	L1	Details
Montreal Alouettes	18	9	9	0	18	471	466	5–5	W1	Details
Hamilton Tiger-Cats	18	8	10	0	16	421	473	5–5	W4	Details
Ottawa Redblacks	18	4	14	0	8	370	475	3–7	L3	Details

=== Schedule ===
Week	Game	Date	Kickoff	Opponent	Results		TV	Venue	Attendance	Summary
Week	Game	Date	Kickoff	Opponent	Score	Record	TV	Venue	Attendance	Summary
1	1	Fri, June 10	8:30 p.m. EDT	at Winnipeg Blue Bombers	L 17–19	0–1	TSN	IG Field	26,002	Recap
2	2	Fri, June 17	7:30 p.m. EDT	vs. Winnipeg Blue Bombers	L 12–19	0–2	TSN/RDS/ESPN2	TD Place Stadium	22,185	Recap
3	Bye									
4	3	Thu, June 30	7:30 p.m. EDT	vs. BC Lions	L 31–34	0–3	TSN/RDS/ESPN2	TD Place Stadium	20,132	Recap
5	4	Fri, July 8	9:30 p.m. EDT	at Saskatchewan Roughriders	L 13–28	0–4	TSN/RDS/ESPNews	Mosaic Stadium	26,685	Recap
6	5	Sat, July 16	5:00 p.m. EDT	at Hamilton Tiger-Cats	L 23–25	0–5	TSN/RDS	Tim Hortons Field	20,411	Recap
7	6	Thu, July 21	7:00 p.m. EDT	vs. Montreal Alouettes	L 33–40	0–6	TSN/RDS	TD Place Stadium	21,537	Recap
8	7	Sun, July 31	5:00 p.m. EDT	at Toronto Argonauts	W 23–13	1–6	TSN/RDS2	BMO Field	10,277	Recap
9	8	Fri, Aug 5	7:30 p.m. EDT	vs. Calgary Stampeders	L 3–17	1–7	TSN/RDS2	TD Place Stadium	20,452	Recap
10	Bye									
11	9	Fri, Aug 19	7:00 p.m. EDT	vs. Edmonton Elks	L 12–30	1–8	TSN/RDS2	TD Place Stadium	19,382	Recap
12	10	Sat, Aug 27	7:00 p.m. EDT	at Edmonton Elks	W 25–18	2–8	TSN/RDS	Commonwealth Stadium	21,787	Recap
13	11	Fri, Sept 2	7:30 p.m. EDT	at Montreal Alouettes	W 38–24	3–8	TSN/RDS	Molson Stadium	15,303	Recap
14	12	Sat, Sept 10	2:00 p.m. EDT	vs. Toronto Argonauts	L 19–24	3–9	TSN/RDS2	TD Place Stadium	21,673	Recap
15	Bye									
16	13	Sat, Sept 24	7:00 p.m. EDT	vs. Toronto Argonauts	L 15–45	3–10	TSN/RDS2	TD Place Stadium	18,355	Recap
17	14	Fri, Sep 30	10:30 p.m. EDT	at BC Lions	L 19–34	3–11	TSN/ESPN2	BC Place	17,069	Recap
18	15	Mon, Oct 10	1:00 p.m. EDT	at Montreal Alouettes	W 24–18	4–11	TSN/RDS/ESPN2	Molson Stadium	21,824	Recap
19	16	Fri, Oct 14	7:00 p.m. EDT	vs. Montreal Alouettes	L 30–34	4–12	TSN/RDS	TD Place Stadium	18,147	Recap
20	17	Fri, Oct 21	7:00 p.m. EDT	at Hamilton Tiger-Cats	L 27–30	4–13	TSN/RDS2	Tim Hortons Field	24,062	Recap
21	18	Sat, Oct 29	5:00 p.m. EDT	vs. Hamilton Tiger-Cats	L 16–23	4–14	TSN/RDS	TD Place Stadium	19,708	Recap

# Games played with white uniforms.
# Games played with colour uniforms.
# Games played with alternate uniforms.

== Roster ==
2022 Ottawa Redblacks final roster
**Quarterbacks**: 7 Tyrie Adams; 19 Nick Arbuckle; 5 Caleb Evans; **Running backs**: 25 Brendan Gillanders; 45 Anthony Gosselin; **Receivers**: 1 Darvin Adams; 87 Keaton Bruggeling; 15 Ryan Davis; 89 Marco Dubois; 18 Justin Hardy; 84 R. J. Harris; 88 Shaq Johnson; 82 Siaosi Mariner	**Offensive linemen**: 64 Dino Boyd T; 63 Darius Ciraco C; 59 Cyrille Hogan-Saindon C/G; 57 Uzoma Osuji T; 52 Zack Pelehos G/T; 54 Jacob Ruby G; 67 Hunter Steward G; **Defensive linemen**: 58 Bryce Carter DE; 56 Alain Cimankinda DT; 97 Tre Hornbuckle DT/DE; 92 Will Kiely DT; 90 Cleyon Laing DT; 94 Lorenzo Mauldin DE; 99 Kene Onyeka DE; 98 Deshawn Stevens DE	**Linebackers**: 32 Adam Auclair; 44 Dan Basambombo; 36 Patrick Nelson; 49 Shaydon Philip; 43 Shaheed Salmon; 46 Tyron Vrede; 42 Avery Williams; **Defensive backs**: 20 Alonzo Addae; 27 Sherrod Baltimore; 35 Douglas Coleman; 37 Brandin Dandridge; 4 Money Hunter; 6 Antoine Pruneau; 34 Damon Webb	**Special teams**: 50 Louis-Philippe Bourassa LS; 13 Richie Leone P/K; 10 Lewis Ward K; **Practice roster**: 86 Quan Bray WR; 2 Dustin Crum QB; 96 Jake Hlava DE; 41 Edris Jean-Alphonse DB; 85 Anthony Mahoungou SB; 91 José Maltos K; 0 Breylin Smith QB; 68 Eric Starczala C; 30 Darius Williams DB; **Suspended list**: Connor Berglof G/C	**Injured list**: 23 Jaelon Acklin WR; 24 Hakeem Bailey DB; 80 Nate Behar SB; 22 Jackson Bennett RB; 93 Kwaku Boateng DE; 9 Davon Coleman DT; 33 Ty Cranston DB; 17 DeVonte Dedmon SB; 28 Frankie Griffin LB; 21 Justin Howell DB; 14 Abdul Kanneh DB; 3 Patrick Levels DB; 95 Praise Martin-Oguike DE; 8 Jeremiah Masoli QB; 29 William Powell RB; 55 Randy Richards T; 47 Nigel Romick DE; 83 Tevaun Smith WR; 31 Devonte Williams RB; 61 Ucambre Williams T
Italics indicate American player • **Bold** indicates Global player

== Coaching staff ==
Ottawa Redblacks staff
Front office: Owner – Ottawa Sports and Entertainment Group (OSEG); Chief executive officer – Mark Goudie; General manager – Shawn Burke; Assistant general manager – Jeremy Snyder; Director of pro personnel – Brendan Taman; Director of canadian scouting & football analytics – Chad Hudson; Pro/College Scout – Philippe Moreau; Video coordinator – Braun Gheller; Head coaches: Head coach – Bob Dyce; Offensive coaches: Offensive line – Paul Charbonneau; Receivers – Alex Suber; Quarterbacks – Will Arndt; Running backs – Fred Reid; Offensive consultant – Doug Malone	Defensive coaches: Defensive Coordinator & Linebackers – Mike Benevides; Defensive line – Mike Phair; Defensive backs – Patrick Bourgon; Defensive assistant – Paul Eddy Saint-Vilien; Special teams coaches: Special teams coordinator – Bob Dyce; Special teams assistant – Cory McDiarmid; Strength and conditioning: Strength and conditioning coordinator – Nick Mercuri; → Coaching staff
