= Joshua Archibald =

Joshua Archibald may refer to:

- Josh Archibald (born 1992), Canadian-born American ice hockey right winger
- Joshua Archibald (Canadian football) (born 1997), Canadian football defensive lineman
