= Jayden Dalke =

Canadian football player (1996–2026)

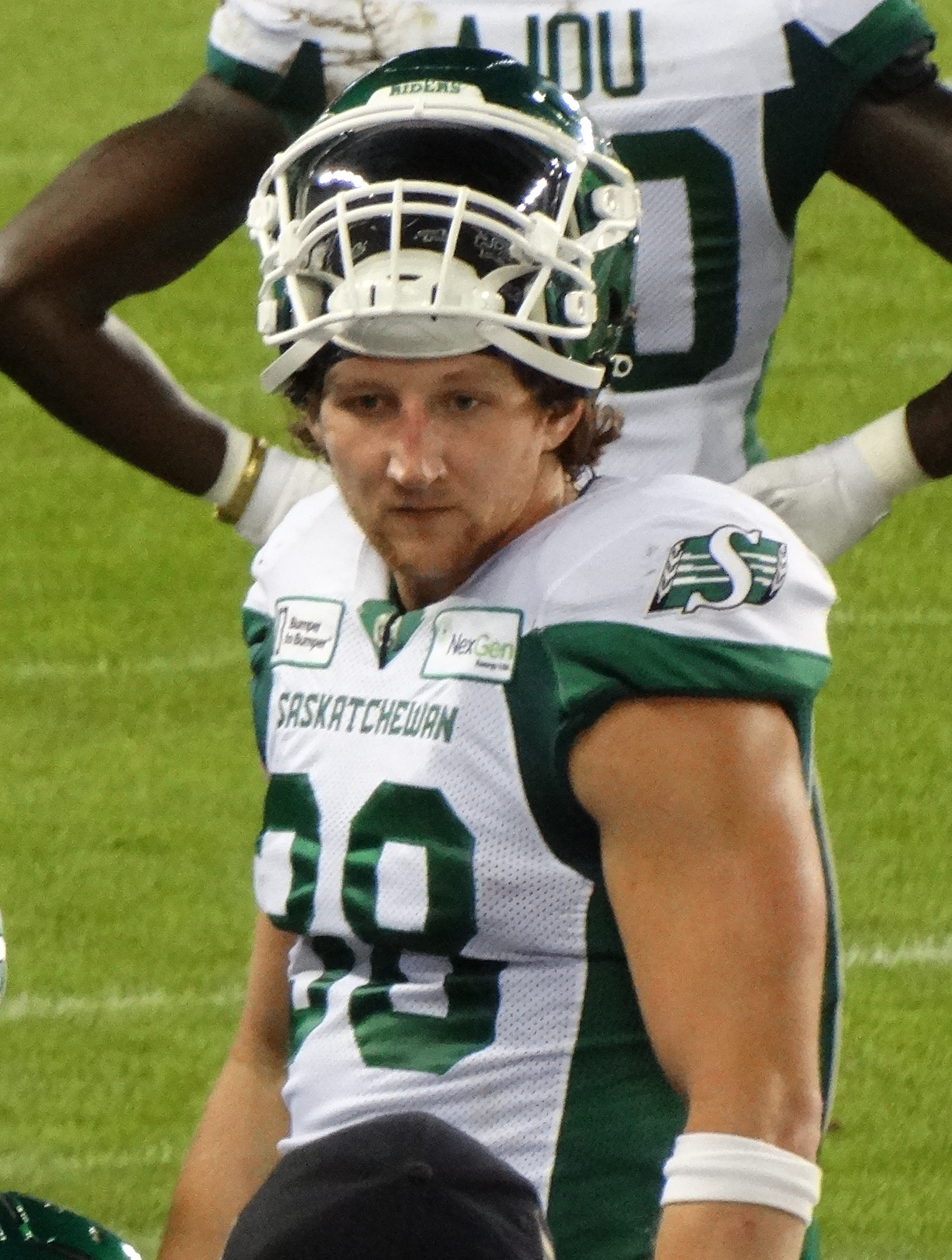
- Dalke with the Saskatchewan Roughriders in 2024

No. 38
- Positions: Safety, linebacker

Personal information
- Born: June 8, 1996; Leduc, Alberta, Canada
- Died: July 18, 2026 (aged 30); Lumsden, Saskatchewan, Canada
- Listed height: 6 ft 1 in (1.85 m)
- Listed weight: 200 lb (91 kg)

Career information
- High school: Leduc
- CJFL: Edmonton Wildcats
- University: Alberta
- CFL draft: 2022: 6th round, 54th overall pick

Career history
- 2022–2026: Saskatchewan Roughriders

Awards and highlights
- Grey Cup champion (2025); First-team All-Canadian (2019); Second-team All-Canadian (2021)
- Stats at CFL.ca

Jayden Dalke (June 8, 1996 – July 18, 2026) was a Canadian professional football player for the Saskatchewan Roughriders of the Canadian Football League (CFL). He played U Sports football for the Alberta Golden Bears.

== Early life ==
Dalke played high school football at Leduc Composite High School in Leduc, Alberta. He was not recruited by any university to play football due to his height of five feet and nine inches. After high school, Dalke spent time in work camps at Fort McMurray. He underwent a significant growth spurt, and in 2015, started playing for the Edmonton Wildcats of the Canadian Junior Football League. He played for the Wildcats for four years.

== University career ==
Dalke joined the Alberta Golden Bears in 2019. He played in nine games for the Golden Bears that year, recording 56 tackles, nine pass breakups, one forced fumble, one fumble recovery, and three interceptions, one of which was returned for a touchdown. Dalke was named a first-team All-Canadian for the 2019 season. The 2020 U Sports football season was cancelled due to the COVID-19 pandemic. He appeared in six games during the 2021 season, totaling 37 tackles and one pass breakup, earning second-team All-Canadian honors.

== Professional career ==
Pre-draft measurables
Height	Weight	40-yard dash	Vertical jump	Broad jump	Bench press
6 ft 1 in (1.85 m)	203 lb (92 kg)	4.86 s	31.0 in (0.79 m)	9 ft 8 3/8 in (2.96 m)	11 reps
All values from CFL Combine

Dalke was selected by the Saskatchewan Roughriders of the Canadian Football League (CFL) in the sixth round, with the 54th overall pick, of the 2022 CFL draft. He officially signed with the team on May 9, 2022. He dressed for all 18 games during his rookie season, recording 15 defensive tackles, 11 special teams tackles and two pass breakups. Dalke started 14 games during the 2023 season, accumulating 41 defensive tackles, three special teams tackles, one interception, two pass breakups and two forced fumbles. He was placed on injured reserve twice during the season. He was named to Pro Football Focus's CFL Honour Roll for Week 7 as a special teams selection. In Week 18, Dalke was fined by the CFL for a hit on Hamilton Tiger-Cats receiver Kiondré Smith. On April 24, 2024, Dalke was awarded the Leduc Achievement Award at a Leduc city council meeting.

Dalke dressed in 16 games, starting one, in 2024 and missed two games due to injury. Overall during the 2024 season, he posted 10 tackles on defense, four tackles on special teams, one sack, one forced fumble, and one pass breakup. He re-signed with the Roughriders on December 18, 2024. Dalke dressed in all 18 games during the 2025 season but did not start any while recording 13 special teams tackles and three defensive tackles. On November 16, 2025, Saskatchewan won the 112th Grey Cup against the Montreal Alouettes by a score of 25–17. Dalke re-signed with the Roughriders again on December 16, 2025.

Dalke dressed in two games in 2026 while missing three due to injury and serving as a team captain. He did not record any statistics during the 2026 season.

== Death ==
On July 18, 2026, Dalke died in a traffic collision near Lumsden, Saskatchewan, at the age of 30. The next day, a moment of silence was held at TD Place Stadium before the Winnipeg Blue Bombers and Ottawa Redblacks game. On July 20, it was reported that Dalke had been driving on the wrong side of a divided highway and that the driver of the other vehicle, Indian national Bhishma Rajyaguru, also died. Alcohol and cannabis were found in Dalke's vehicle. About 30 minutes prior to the wreck, he also allegedly left a gas station without paying.

On July 23, the Roughriders held a moment of silence for Dalke and Rajyaguru before their game against the Edmonton Elks. On their first punt of the game, Saskatchewan fielded only 11 players in honor of Dalke and drew a time count violation. The Elks declined the penalty.

On October 15, 2026, Royal Canadian Mounted Police announced the investigation into the collision was complete. The Saskatchewan Coroners Service said the toxicology report was protected by personal health information laws.

== See also ==
- List of gridiron football players who died during their careers
