= Daniel Kwamou =

Canadian gridiron football player (born 2000)

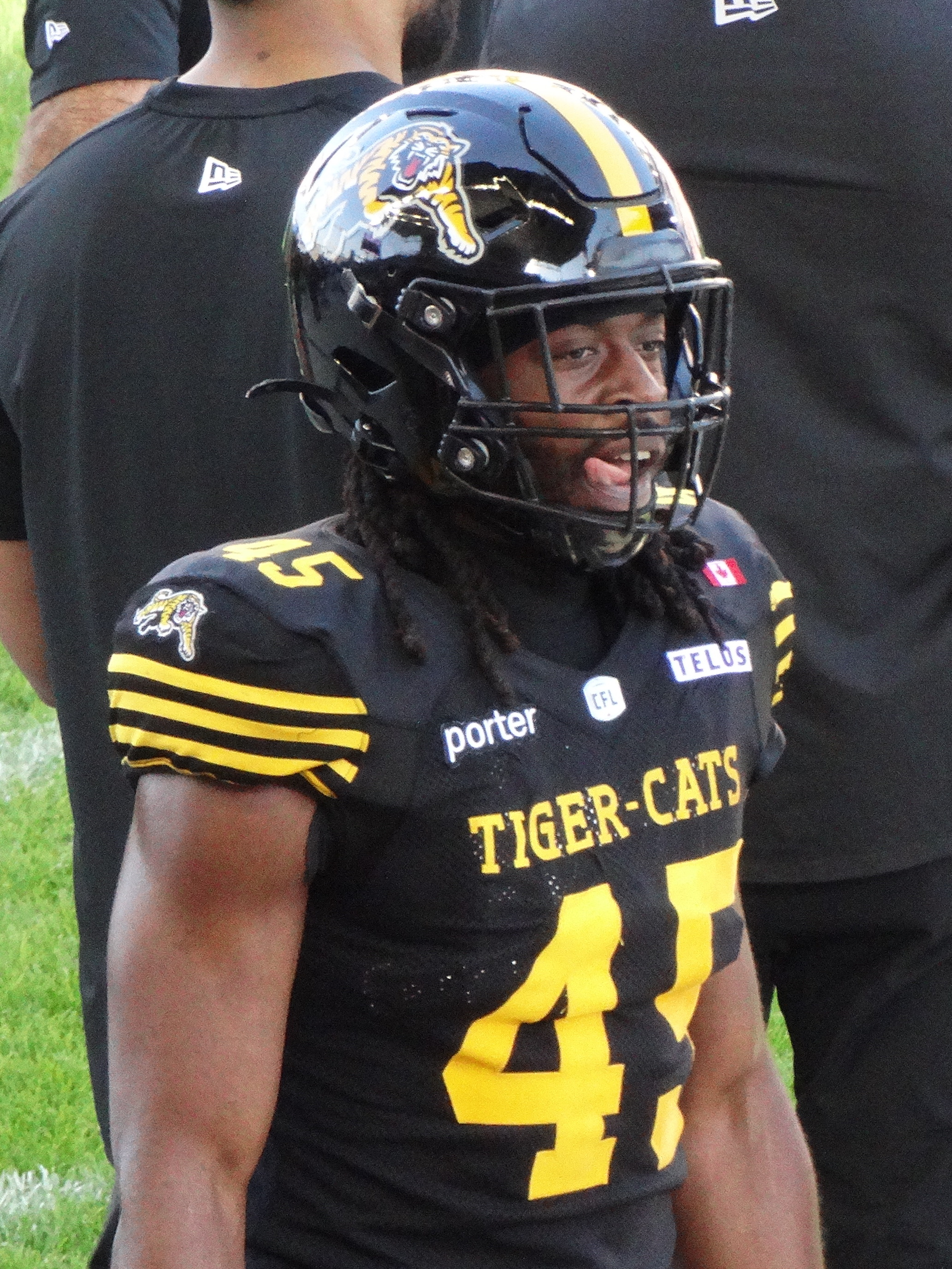
- Kwamou with the Hamilton Tiger-Cats in 2025

Profile
- Position: Linebacker

Personal information
- Born: April 27, 2000 (age 26); Calgary, Alberta, Canada
- Listed height: 6 ft 0 in (1.83 m)
- Listed weight: 224 lb (102 kg)

Career information
- High school: Notre Dame High
- University: UBC Thunderbirds
- CFL draft: 2022: 5th round, 44th overall pick

Career history
- 2023–2025: Toronto Argonauts
- 2025: Hamilton Tiger-Cats
- 2026: Ottawa Redblacks

Awards and highlights
- Grey Cup champion (2024)
- Stats at CFL.ca

Daniel Kwamou (born April 27, 2000) is a Canadian professional football linebacker. He most recently played for the Ottawa Redblacks of the Canadian Football League (CFL).

== University career ==
Kwamou played U Sports football for the UBC Thunderbirds from 2018 to 2022. He played in 25 regular season games where he recorded 61 solo tackles, 42 assisted tackles, 2.5 sacks, and one interception.

== Professional career ==
Pre-draft measurables
Height	Weight	Bench press
5 ft 11 5/8 in (1.82 m)	223 lb (101 kg)	16 reps
All values from CFL Combine

=== Toronto Argonauts ===
Kwamou was drafted in the fifth round, 44th overall, in the 2022 CFL draft by the Toronto Argonauts and signed with the team on May 10, 2022. However, he was released at the end of training camp and returned to UBC to complete his U Sports eligibility. He re-signed with the Argonauts at the end of the 2022 season on December 6, 2022.

Following training camp in 2023, Kwamou began the season on the practice roster, but made his professional debut on July 3, 2023, against the BC Lions. For the season, he played in nine regular season games where he recorded eight special teams tackles. In the 2024 season, Kwamou was on the injured list for the entire season, but when he became healthy, he was a scratch for the Argonauts' victory in the 111th Grey Cup championship over the Winnipeg Blue Bombers.

In 2025, Kwamou played in four of the team's first five games where he recorded two special teams tackles. He was released on July 15, 2025.

=== Hamilton Tiger-Cats ===
On July 23, 2025, it was announced that Kwamou had signed with the Hamilton Tiger-Cats. He played in seven regular season games where he had three special teams tackles. He ended the season on the practice roster and his contract expired on November 9, 2025.

=== Ottawa Redblacks ===
On August 25, 2026, Kwamou signed with the Ottawa Redblacks practice roster. He played in one game where he did not record a statistic and was released on September 7, 2026.
