= Deonta McMahon =

American gridiron football player (born 2000)

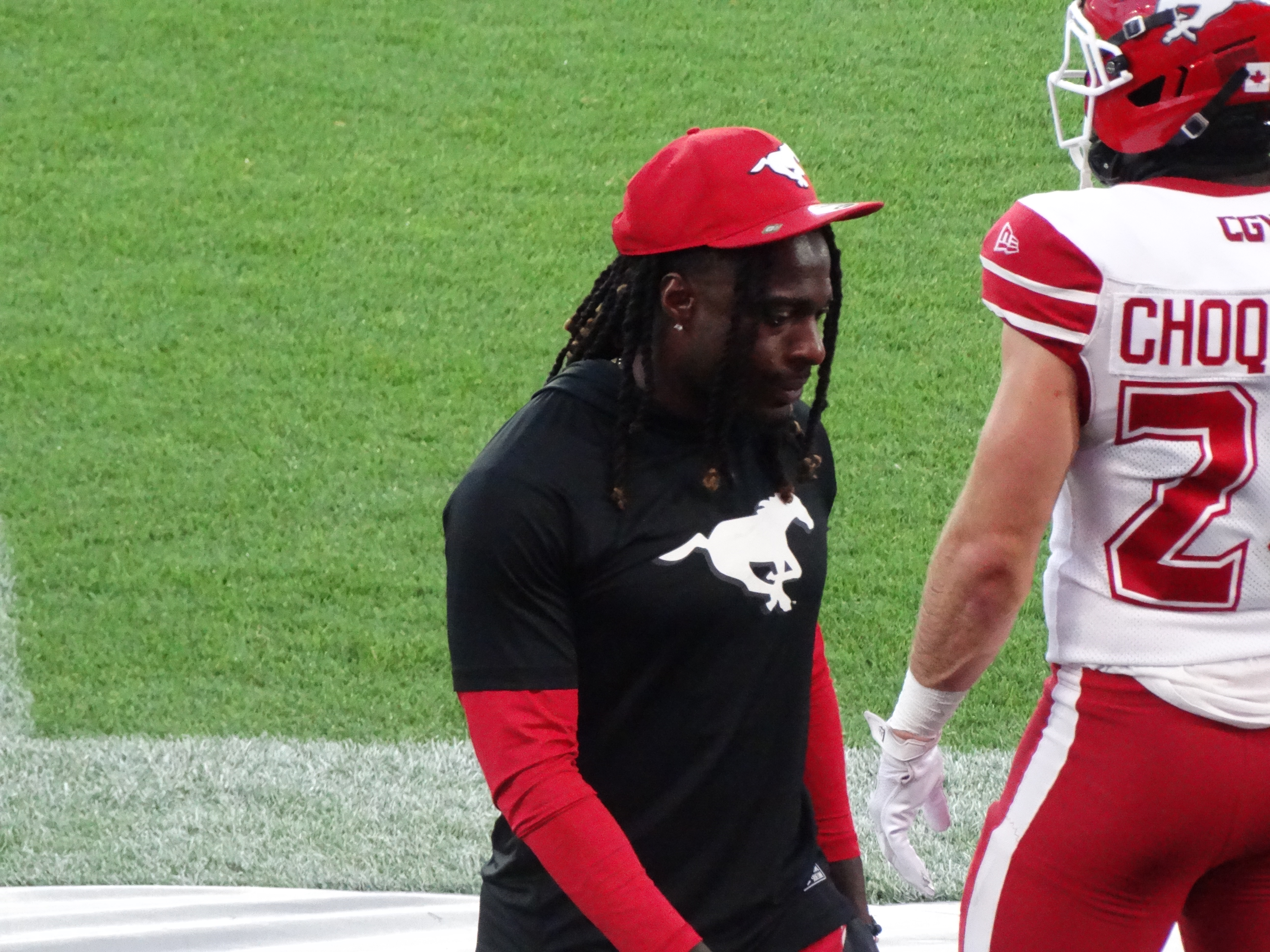
- McMahon with the Calgary Stampeders in 2026

No. 20 – Calgary Stampeders
- Position: Running back
- Roster status: Active
- CFL status: American

Personal information
- Born: March 7, 2000 (age 26); Frostproof, Florida, U.S.
- Listed height: 5 ft 8 in (1.73 m)
- Listed weight: 178 lb (81 kg)

Career information
- High school: Frostproof
- College: McNeese State Cowboys; Butte College

Career history
- 2023–2025: Toronto Argonauts
- 2026–present: Calgary Stampeders

Awards and highlights
- Grey Cup champion (2024)
- Stats at CFL.ca

Deonta McMahon (/diˈɑːnteɪ ˈmækməˌhɔːn/ dee-AWN-tay MAK-mə-HAWN; born March 7, 2000) is an American professional football running back for the Calgary Stampeders of the Canadian Football League (CFL). He is a Grey Cup champion after winning with the Toronto Argonauts in 2024.

== College career ==
McMahon first played college football for the Butte College Roadrunners in 2019. He then transferred to play for the McNeese State Cowboys from 2020 to 2022.

== Professional career ==
Pre-draft measurables
Height	Weight
5 ft 7 5/8 in (1.72 m)	185 lb (84 kg)
Values from Pro Day

=== Toronto Argonauts ===
McMahon signed with the Toronto Argonauts on May 3, 2023. Following training camp, he began the 2023 season on the practice roster, but made his professional debut on September 15, against the Montreal Alouettes, where he recorded two carries for 30 yards and one reception for two yards. Following injuries to fellow running backs A. J. Ouellette and Andrew Harris, McMahon earned his first career start on September 23, against the Hamilton Tiger-Cats. He finished the year having played in seven regular season games, starting in one, where he had 38 carries for 134 yards and three touchdowns along with 10 catches for 64 yards.

In 2024, McMahon was part of a regular rotation at running back with starter Ka'Deem Carey and Daniel Adeboboye. He played in all 18 regular season games where he had 48 carries for 288 yards and four touchdowns along with and 30 receptions for 237 yards and one touchdown. He also played in all three post-season games, including the 111th Grey Cup where he had two catches for 41 yards in the Argonauts' 41–24 victory over the Winnipeg Blue Bombers.

McMahon played in 14 games in 2025 where he had 42 rush attempts for 156 yards and one touchdown along with 18 receptions for 130 yards. He also had six punt returns for 39 yards and seven kickoff returns for 151 yards. He was released in the following off-season on January 29, 2026.

=== Calgary Stampeders ===
On February 2, 2026, it was announced that McMahon had signed with the Calgary Stampeders.
