= Noah Zerr =

Canadian gridiron football player (born 1998)

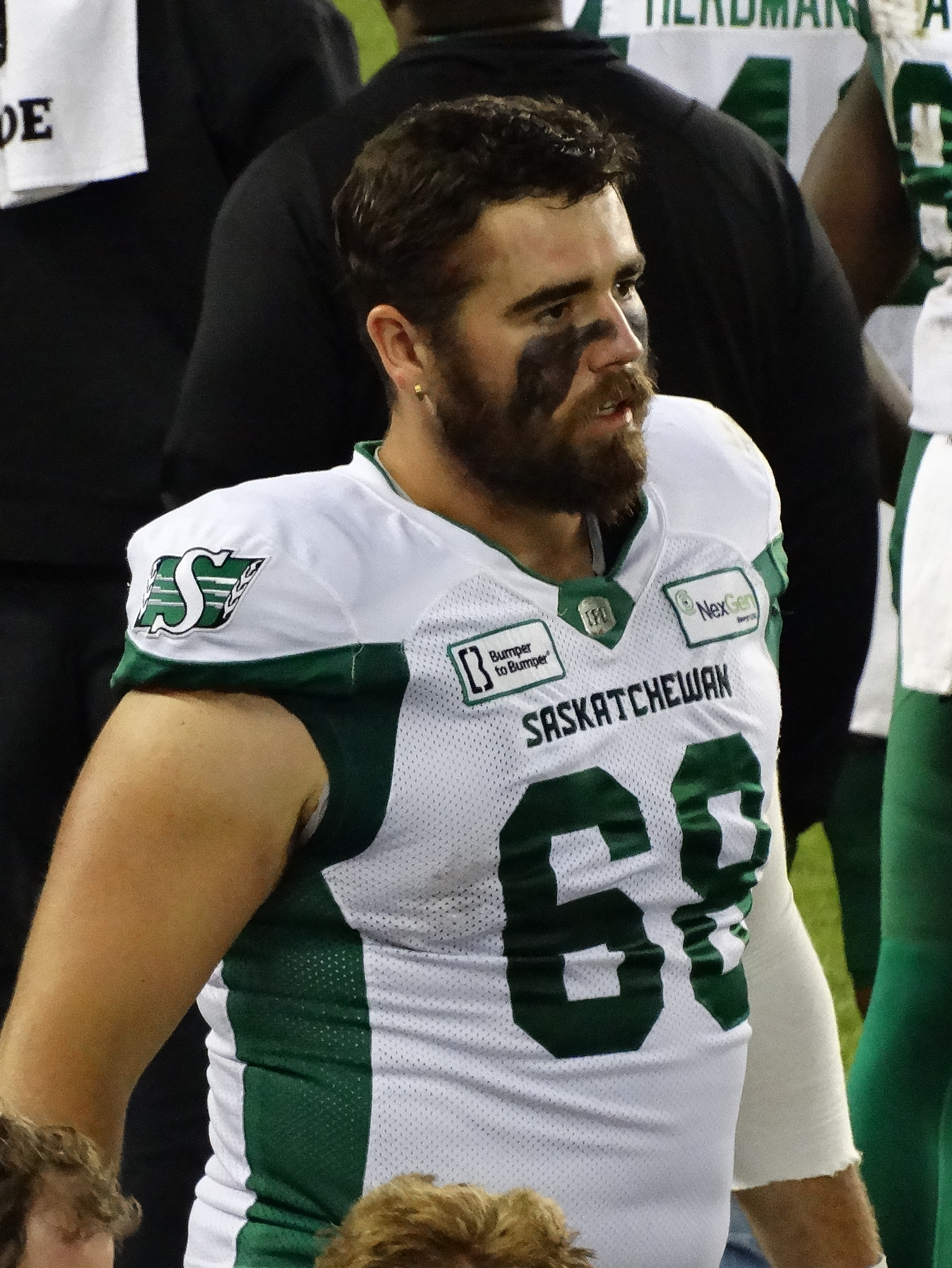
- Zerr with the Saskatchewan Roughriders in 2024

Profile
- Position: Offensive lineman

Personal information
- Born: July 20, 1998 (age 28); Langenburg, Saskatchewan, Canada
- Listed height: 6 ft 7 in (2.01 m)
- Listed weight: 330 lb (150 kg)

Career information
- University: Saskatchewan
- CFL draft: 2022: 2nd round, 12th overall pick

Career history
- 2022: BC Lions
- 2023: Hamilton Tiger-Cats
- 2024–2025: Saskatchewan Roughriders

Awards and highlights
- Grey Cup champion (2025); First-team All-Canadian (2021); Canada West All-Star (2021)
- Stats at CFL.ca

Noah Zerr (born July 20, 1998) is a Canadian professional football offensive lineman. He played U Sports football for the Saskatchewan Huskies. He has been a member of the BC Lions, Hamilton Tiger-Cats, and Saskatchewan Roughriders of the Canadian Football League (CFL).

== Early life ==
Zerr was born in Langenburg, Saskatchewan and attended Yorkton Regional High School in Yorkton, Saskatchewan.

== University career ==
Zerr played four seasons of U Sports football with the Saskatchewan Huskies. He was named a first team All-Canadian and Canada West All-Star in 2021.

== Professional career ==
Pre-draft measurables
Height	Weight	40-yard dash	20-yard shuttle	Three-cone drill	Vertical jump	Broad jump	Bench press
6 ft 6 1/2 in (1.99 m)	305 lb (138 kg)	5.79 s	5.06 s	8.42 s	26.5 in (0.67 m)	7 ft 10 1/8 in (2.39 m)	18 reps
All values from CFL Combine

=== BC Lions ===
Zerr was selected by the BC Lions of the Canadian Football League (CFL) in the second round, with the 12th overall pick, of the 2022 CFL draft. He officially signed with the team on May 19. He was moved between the active roster and injured reserve several times during the 2022 season. Overall, Zerr dressed in four games for the Lions. He was released on June 4, 2023.

=== Hamilton Tiger-Cats ===
Zerr was signed to the practice roster of the Hamilton Tiger-Cats on June 20, 2023. He was moved between the practice roster and active roster several times during the 2023 season, and dressed in three games for the Tiger-Cats. He was released on November 5, 2023.

=== Saskatchewan Roughriders ===
Zerr signed with the Saskatchewan Roughriders on December 22, 2023. He was placed on the 6-game injured list on June 7, 2024. He made his Roughrider debut in week 9 and dressed in ten regular season games in 2024. He was part of training camp cuts in 2025 and was released on May 14, 2025. However, he was re-signed six days later on May 20, 2025. He became a free agent after the 2025 season.
