= Zack Pelehos =

Canadian gridiron football player (born 1999)

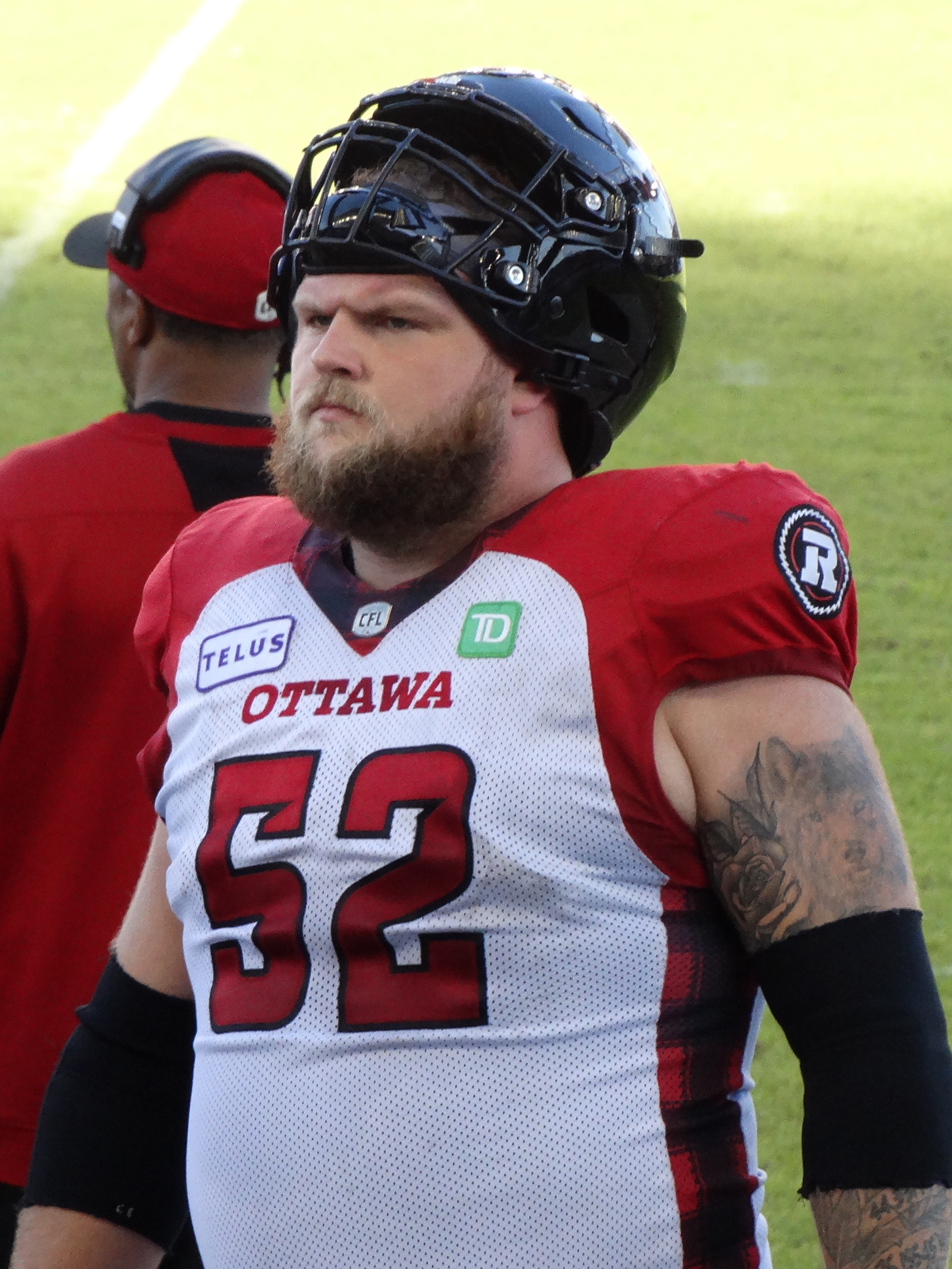
- Pelehos with the Ottawa Redblacks in 2024

No. 52 – Ottawa Redblacks
- Position: Offensive lineman
- Roster status: 6-game injured list
- CFL status: National

Personal information
- Born: July 12, 1999 (age 27); Gananoque, Ontario, Canada
- Listed height: 6 ft 5 in (1.96 m)
- Listed weight: 304 lb (138 kg)

Career information
- High school: Gananoque Secondary
- University: Ottawa
- CFL draft: 2022: 1st round, 2nd overall pick

Career history
- 2022–present: Ottawa Redblacks
- Stats at CFL.ca

Zack Pelehos (born July 12, 1999) is a Canadian professional football offensive lineman with the Ottawa Redblacks of the Canadian Football League (CFL).

== University career ==
Pelehos played U Sports football for the Ottawa Gee-Gees from 2018 to 2021. He did not play in 2019 after using a redshirt season and did not play in 2020 due to the cancellation of the 2020 U Sports football season. He returned to play in 2021 and played and started in 16 regular season games over two seasons.

== Professional career ==
Pre-draft measurables
Height	Weight	40-yard dash	20-yard shuttle	Three-cone drill	Vertical jump	Broad jump	Bench press
6 ft 5 3/8 in (1.97 m)	296 lb (134 kg)	5.28 s	4.84 s	7.93 s	28.5 in (0.72 m)	8 ft 9 5/8 in (2.68 m)	15 reps
All values from CFL Combine

Pelehos was ranked as the 15th best player in the Canadian Football League's Amateur Scouting Bureau final rankings for players eligible in the 2022 CFL draft. He was then drafted with the second overall pick, and first by players in U Sports, by the Ottawa Redblacks. He began the 2022 season on the injured list, but made his professional debut in week 2 on June 17, 2022, against the Winnipeg Blue Bombers, as a backup offensive lineman. He spent eight games on the injured list and played in ten games for the Redblacks during his rookie season.

Following training camp in 2023, Pelehos won a starting job and earned his first career start at right tackle on June 10, 2023, against the Montreal Alouettes. He had eventually lost his starting role to Dontae Bull in August, but reclaimed the starting position on October 14, 2023. He played in 14 regular season games in 2023.
