= Cyrille Hogan-Saindon =

Canadian gridiron football player (born 1997)

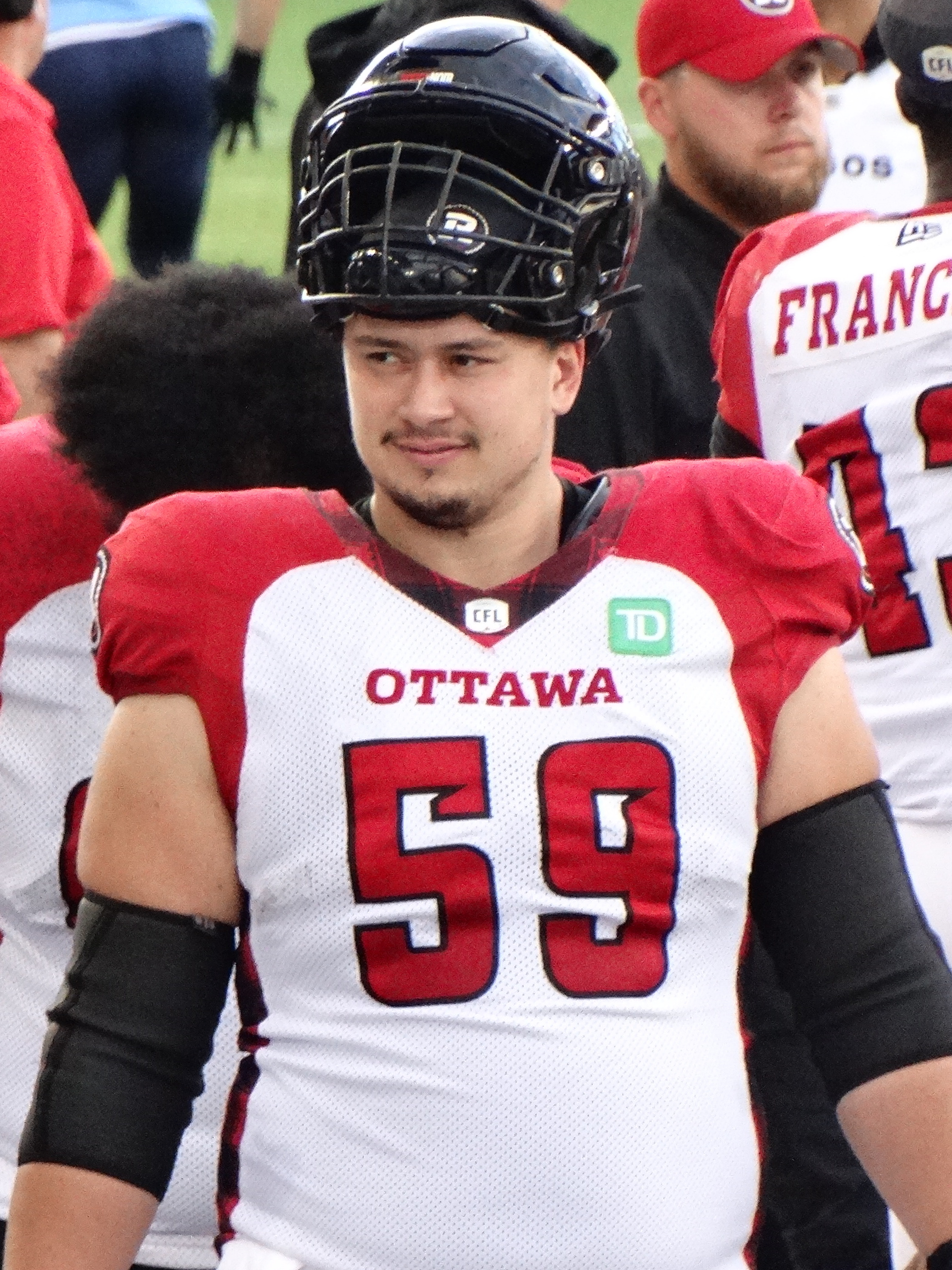
- Hogan-Saindon with the Ottawa Redblacks in 2023

No. 59 – Montreal Alouettes
- Position: Offensive lineman
- Roster status: Active
- CFL status: National

Personal information
- Born: August 6, 1997 (age 29); Quebec City, Quebec, Canada
- Listed height: 6 ft 4 in (1.93 m)
- Listed weight: 310 lb (141 kg)

Career information
- University: Laval
- CFL draft: 2022: 2nd round, 11th overall pick

Career history
- Ottawa Redblacks (2022–2024); Montreal Alouettes (2025–present)
- Stats at CFL.ca

Cyrille Hogan-Saindon (born August 6, 1997) is a Canadian professional football offensive lineman for the Montreal Alouettes of the Canadian Football League (CFL).

== University career ==
Hogan-Saindon played U Sports football for the Laval Rouge et Or from 2017 to 2021, but did not play in a game until 2021. As a member of the powerhouse program that had won a Vanier Cup in 2018, he was buried on the depth chart behind other teammates. As he was about to earn playing time in 2020, but the 2020 U Sports football season was instead cancelled due to the COVID-19 pandemic. Hogan-Saindon then not only played in his first game in August 2021, but also started the game at centre. He was named an RSEQ All-Star at the end of the 2021 season.

== Professional career ==
Pre-draft measurables
| Height | Weight | 40-yard dash | 20-yard shuttle | Three-cone drill | Vertical jump | Broad jump | Bench press |
|---|---|---|---|---|---|---|---|
| 6 ft 4 in (1.93 m) | 301 lb (137 kg) | 5.49 s | 4.81 s | 7.68 s | 27.5 in (0.70 m) | 8 ft 1 in (2.46 m) | 26 reps |
All values from CFL Combine

=== Ottawa Redblacks ===
Hogan-Saindon was ranked as the 18th best player in the Canadian Football League's Amateur Scouting Bureau final rankings for players eligible in the 2022 CFL draft. He was then drafted with the 11th overall pick, in the second round, by the Ottawa Redblacks, and signed with the team on May 10, 2022. Following training camp in 2022 season, Hogan-Saindon made the team's active roster and made his professional debut on June 10, 2022, against the Winnipeg Blue Bombers, as a backup offensive lineman. Four weeks later, he made his first career start on July 8, 2022, against the Saskatchewan Roughriders. He played in all 18 regular season games that season, starting in three.

In 2023, Hogan-Saindon earned a starting position following training camp and played and started in 18 regular season games. He also had his first career reception when he caught a deflected pass for three yards on July 28, 2023, against the Hamilton Tiger-Cats. In 2024, he played in nine regular season games. He became a free agent upon the expiry of his contract on February 11, 2025.

=== Montreal Alouettes ===
On February 11, 2025, it was announced that Hogan-Saindon had signed with the Montreal Alouettes.
