= Anthony Federico =

Canadian former gridiron football player (born 1997)

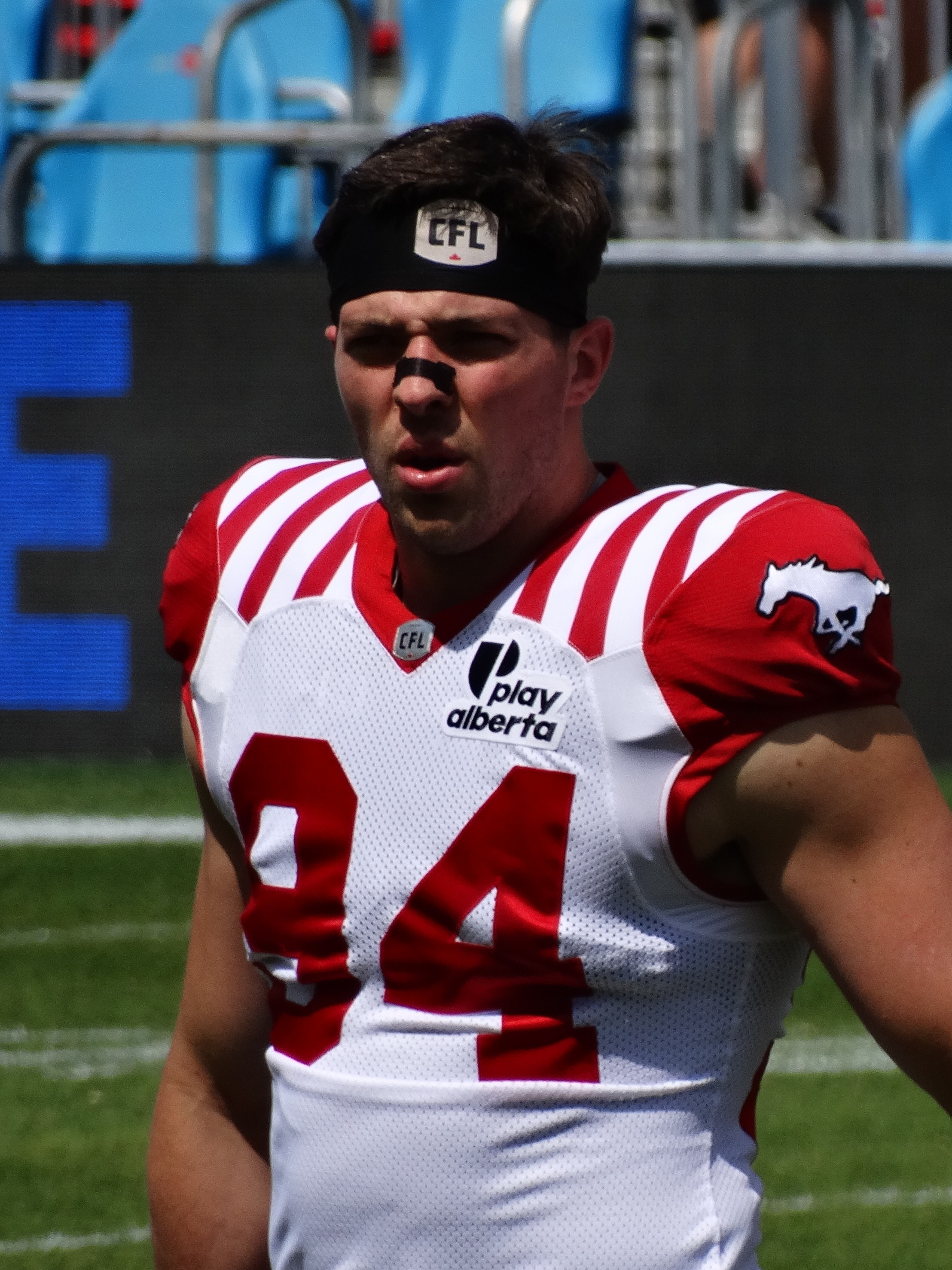
- Federico with the Calgary Stampeders in 2025

No. 94
- Position: Defensive end

Personal information
- Born: November 7, 1997 (age 29); Niagara Falls, Ontario, Canada
- Listed height: 6 ft 4 in (1.93 m)
- Listed weight: 250 lb (113 kg)

Career information
- High school: Saint Michael High
- CJFL: Hamilton Hurricanes
- University: Queen's
- CFL draft: 2022: 2nd round, 17th overall pick

Career history
- 2022–2023: Hamilton Tiger-Cats
- 2024: Montreal Alouettes
- 2024–2025: Calgary Stampeders
- Stats at CFL.ca

Anthony Federico (born November 7, 1997) is a Canadian former professional football defensive end.

== Junior career ==
Federico played for the Hamilton Hurricanes of the Canadian Junior Football League for two seasons after graduating from high school. While playing for the Hurricanes, he worked on his sports management diploma at Niagara College.

== University career ==
After using a redshirt season in 2017, Federico played U Sports football for the Queen's Gaels from 2018 to 2021. He played in 23 games where he recorded 87 total tackles, including 34.5 tackles for a loss, 20.5 sacks, and one pass breakup.

== Professional career ==
Pre-draft measurables
| Height | Weight | 40-yard dash | 20-yard shuttle | Three-cone drill | Vertical jump | Broad jump | Bench press |
|---|---|---|---|---|---|---|---|
| 6 ft 3 5/8 in (1.92 m) | 235 lb (107 kg) | 4.87 s | 4.30 s | 6.98 s | 33.5 in (0.85 m) | 9 ft 7 1/4 in (2.93 m) | 12 reps |
All values from CFL Combine

=== Hamilton Tiger-Cats ===
Federico was selected in the second round, 17th overall, by the Hamilton Tiger-Cats in the 2022 CFL draft and signed with the team on May 9, 2022. Following training camp in 2022, he began the season on the practice roster, but soon after made his professional debut on July 21, 2022, against the BC Lions where he had one special teams tackle. Federico played in ten regular season games in his rookie season where he had five special teams tackles. He also played in the team's East Semi-Final loss to the Montreal Alouettes.

In 2023, Federico made the team's opening day roster and played in the first 13 regular season games where he had five special teams tackles. He was on the injured list for the last five games of the season. He attended training camp with the team in 2024, but was part of the final cuts on June 1, 2024.

=== Montreal Alouettes ===
On July 9, 2024, it was announced that Federico had signed with the Montreal Alouettes. He played in two regular season games and was released from the practice roster on September 16, 2024.

=== Calgary Stampeders ===
On September 17, 2024, it was announced that Federico had signed with the Calgary Stampeders.

On May 2, 2026, Federico announced his retirement from professional football.
