= Jamar McGloster =

American gridiron football player (born 1995)

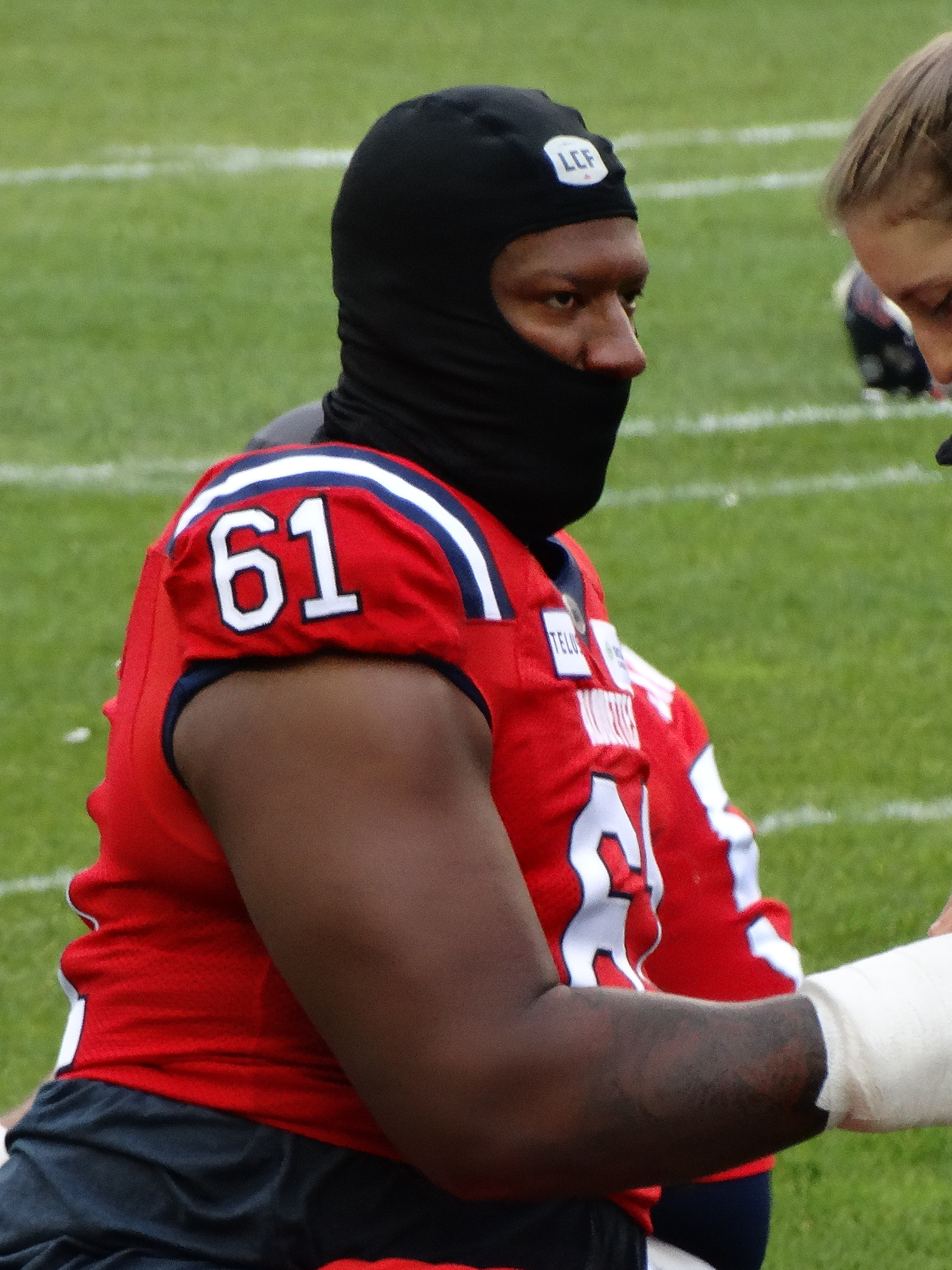
- McGloster with the Montreal Alouettes in 2023

Profile
- Position: Offensive tackle

Personal information
- Born: June 4, 1995 (age 31); Newark, New Jersey, U. S.
- Listed height: 6 ft 7 in (2.01 m)
- Listed weight: 308 lb (140 kg)

Career information
- High school: Saint Anthony
- College: Syracuse

Career history
- San Francisco 49ers (2018)*; Detroit Lions (2018)*; Los Angeles Chargers (2018)*; Oakland Raiders (2018)*; Winnipeg Blue Bombers (2019); Los Angeles Chargers (2019)*; Ottawa Redblacks (2020–2021); BC Lions (2022)*; Montreal Alouettes (2022–2025); Ottawa Redblacks (2026)
- * Offseason or practice squad member only

Awards and highlights
- Grey Cup champion (2023)
- Stats at Pro Football Reference
- Stats at CFL.ca

Jamar Daevon McGloster (born June 4, 1995) is an American professional football offensive tackle. He most recently played for the Ottawa Redblacks of the Canadian Football League (CFL).

== College career ==
After using a redshirt season in 2013, McGloster played college football for the Syracuse Orange from 2014 to 2017. He played in 30 games for the Orange and started in 27 of them.

== Professional career ==
=== San Francisco 49ers ===
McGloster signed as an undrafted free agent with the San Francisco 49ers on May 7, 2018. However, he was waived prior to the preseason on July 25, 2018.

=== Detroit Lions ===
On July 31, 2018, McGloster signed with the Detroit Lions. However, he was released among the final roster cuts on August 31, 2018.

=== Los Angeles Chargers (first stint) ===
McGloster signed a practice squad agreement with the Los Angeles Chargers on October 2, 2018. One week later, he was released on October 9, 2018.

=== Oakland Raiders ===
On October 30, 2018, McGloster signed with the Oakland Raiders to their practice squad. He remained on the practice squad and signed a futures contract for the 2019 season on January 2, 2019. However, he was released in the offseason on May 6, 2019.

=== Winnipeg Blue Bombers ===
McGloster signed with the Winnipeg Blue Bombers on May 25, 2019. He made the team's active roster, but was the reserve player for the first three weeks of the regular season. He was then moved to the Blue Bombers' practice roster in week 5 before being released.

=== Los Angeles Chargers (second stint) ===
On August 2, 2019, it was announced that McGloster had signed with the Chargers again. At the end of training camp, he was released with the final cuts on August 30, 2019.

=== Ottawa Redblacks ===
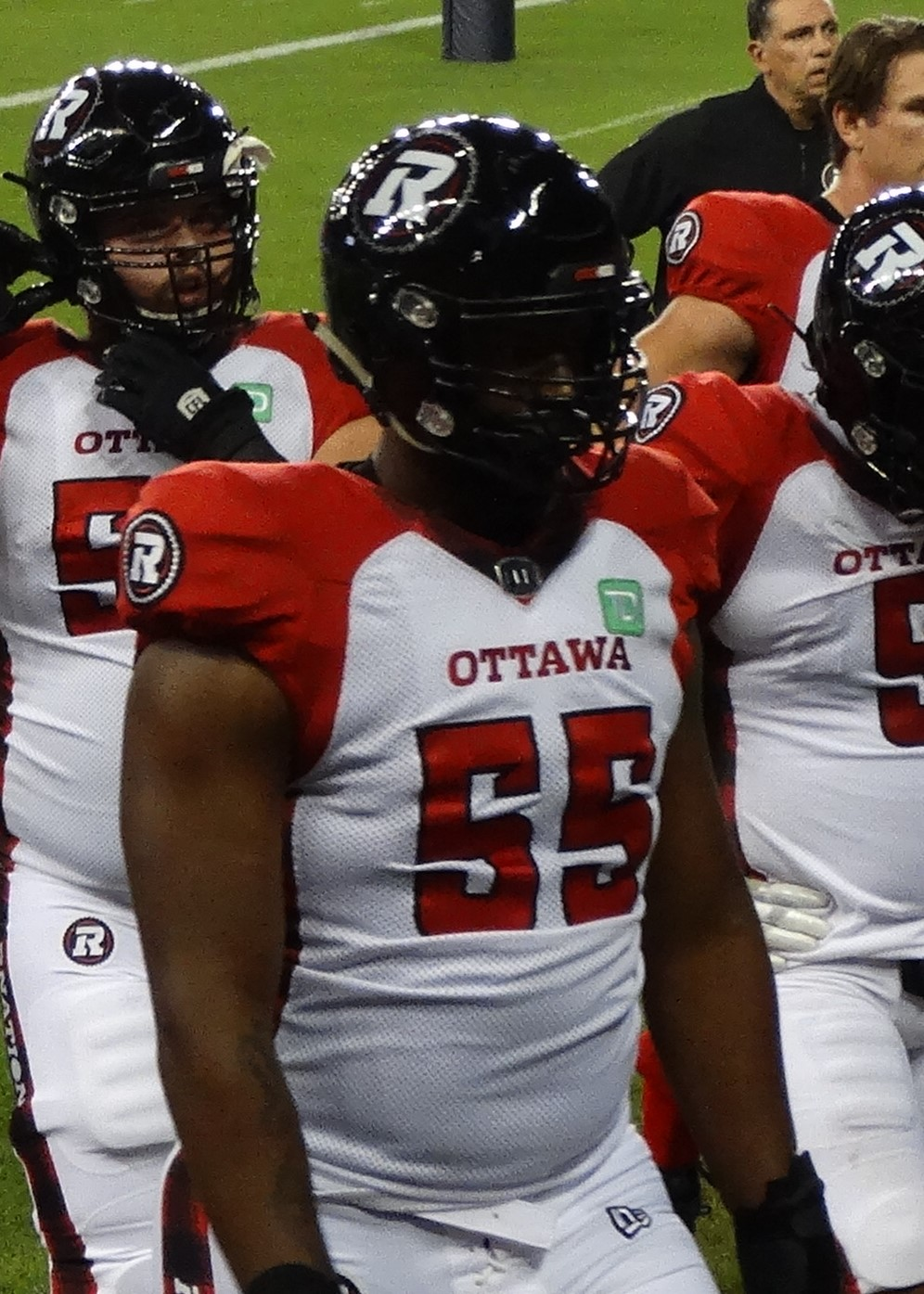
McGloster with the Ottawa Redblacks in 2021

McGloster signed with the Ottawa Redblacks on January 6, 2020. However, he did not play in 2020 due to the cancellation of the 2020 CFL season. He began the 2021 season on the practice roster, but made his long-awaited professional debut on September 11, 2021, against the BC Lions. He played and started in five regular season games in 2021, but sat out the last five games of the season due to injury.

=== BC Lions ===
On February 9, 2022, McGloster signed with the BC Lions. However, he was released with final training camp cuts on May 30, 2022.

=== Montreal Alouettes ===
On July 17, 2022, it was announced that McGloster had been signed by the Montreal Alouettes. He spent the 2022 season on the team's practice roster, but was retained for 2023. Following an injury to the incumbent right tackle, Landon Rice, McGloster started the week 6 game against the Calgary Stampeders on July 30, 2023. Rice returned from injury and McGloster was placed back on the practice roster, but he returned to play when Rice was re-injured. In total, McGloster played in 11 regular season games in 2023 and started in nine.

He became a free agent upon the expiry of his contract on February 2, 2026.

=== Ottawa Redblacks (second stint) ===
On August 3, 2026, McGloster signed with the Ottawa Redblacks. He was released on August 26.

== Personal life ==
McGloster was born in Newark, New Jersey to parents Horace McGloster and Yolanda Hickman; raised in Hillside, New Jersey, he played prep football at St. Anthony High School. He has two brothers and three sisters.
