= Nathan Cherry =

Canadian gridiron football player (born 1998)

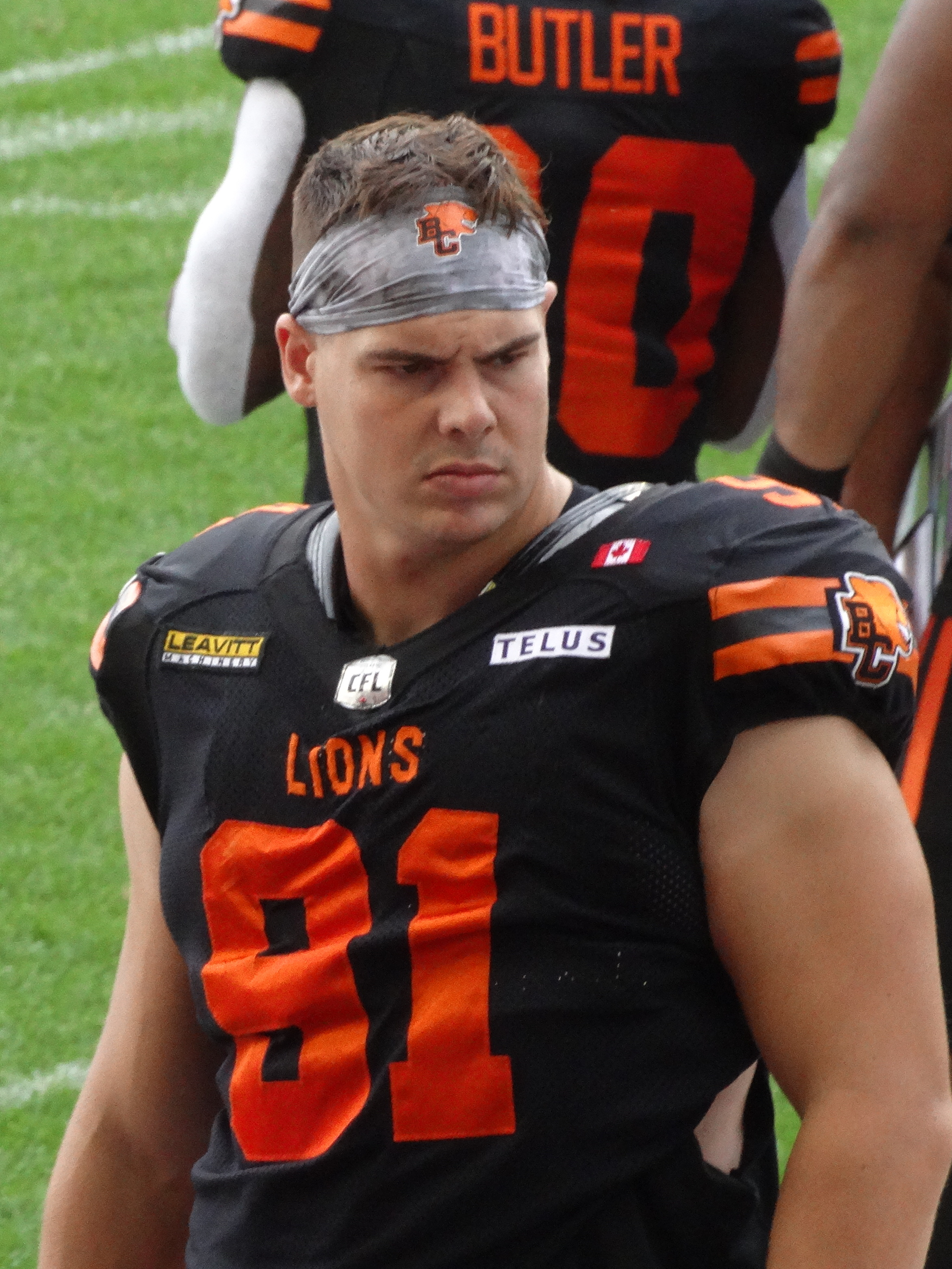
- Cherry with the BC Lions in 2025

No. 91 – BC Lions
- Position: Defensive lineman
- Roster status: Active
- CFL status: National

Personal information
- Born: August 19, 1998 (age 28); Saskatoon, Saskatchewan, Canada
- Listed height: 6 ft 1 in (1.85 m)
- Listed weight: 271 lb (123 kg)

Career information
- High school: Aden Bowman Collegiate
- University: Saskatchewan Huskies
- CFL draft: 2022: 1st round, 3rd overall pick

Career history
- 2022–present: BC Lions

Awards and highlights
- First-team All-Canadian (2021)
- Stats at CFL.ca

Nathan Cherry (born August 19, 1998) is a Canadian professional football defensive lineman for the BC Lions of the Canadian Football League (CFL).

== University career ==
Cherry played U Sports football for the Saskatchewan Huskies from 2016 to 2021. He played in 30 games where he had 37.5 total tackles, 10 sacks, and 12 tackles for a loss. He was named a U Sports First Team All-Canadian in 2021 after finishing third in U Sports with 5.5 sacks to go along with 13.5 total tackles in six games. He did not play in 2020 due to the cancellation of the 2020 U Sports football season and chose to defer his eligibility to the 2022 CFL draft.

== Professional career ==
Pre-draft measurables
Height	Weight	40-yard dash	20-yard shuttle	Three-cone drill	Vertical jump	Broad jump	Bench press
6 ft 1 3/8 in (1.86 m)	271 lb (123 kg)	4.96 s	4.63 s	7.64 s	33.0 in (0.84 m)	9 ft 4 1/4 in (2.85 m)	26 reps
All values from CFL Combine

Cherry was drafted in the first round, third overall, by the BC Lions in the 2022 CFL draft and signed with the team on May 11, 2022. He made the team's active roster following training camp and made his professional debut on June 11, 2022, against the Edmonton Elks. He made his first start on September 9, 2022, against the Montreal Alouettes. Cherry played in 17 regular season games in 2022, starting in seven, where he recorded seven defensive tackles, one sack, and one forced fumble. He also played in his first post-season game on November 6, 2022, against the Calgary Stampeders.

In 2023, Cherry made the team's opening day roster as a backup defensive lineman.

On December 22, 2025, Cherry re-signed with the Lions, on a two-year contract extension.

On September 24, 2026, Cherry was placed on the Lions' reserve roster after suffering a leg injury the previous week. He rejoined the active roster on October 16, 2026. On October 30, 2026, Cherry was placed on the Lions' 1-game injured list ahead of the Western Semi-Final and he remained there to end the 2026 CFL season.
