= Rodeem Brown =

Canadian gridiron football player (born 1999)

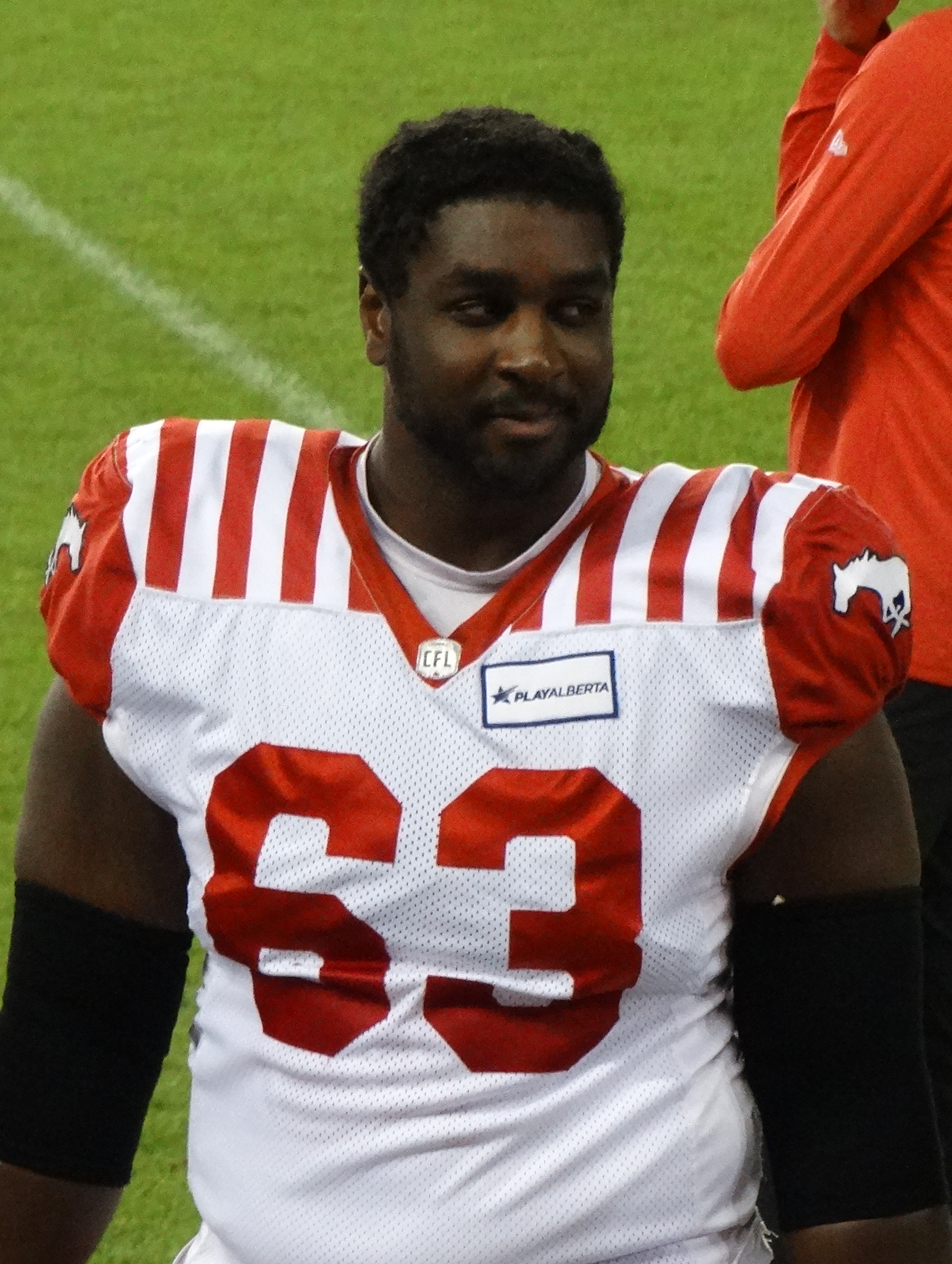
- Brown with the Calgary Stampeders in 2024

No. 63
- Position: Offensive lineman

Personal information
- Born: December 17, 1999 (age 26); Halifax, Nova Scotia, Canada
- Listed height: 6 ft 0 in (1.83 m)
- Listed weight: 289 lb (131 kg)

Career information
- High school: Centennial Collegiate
- University: Alberta
- CFL draft: 2022: 2nd round, 18th overall pick

Career history
- 2022: Montreal Alouettes*
- 2023: Montreal Alouettes*
- 2023–2025: Calgary Stampeders
- * Offseason or practice squad member only

Awards and highlights
- Second-team All-Canadian (2021)

Career CFL statistics as of 2025
- Games played: 27
- Stats at CFL.ca

Rodeem Brown (born December 17, 1999) is a Canadian professional football offensive lineman.

== University career ==
Brown played U Sports football for the Alberta Golden Bears from 2018 to 2022. He played in 32 games and was named a U Sports First Team All-Canadian in 2021.

== Professional career ==
Pre-draft measurables
Height	Weight	40-yard dash	20-yard shuttle	Three-cone drill	Vertical jump	Broad jump	Bench press
6 ft 0 5/8 in (1.84 m)	280 lb (127 kg)	5.30 s	4.90 s	7.82 s	27.5 in (0.70 m)	8 ft 7 3/8 in (2.63 m)	19 reps
All values from CFL Combine

=== Montreal Alouettes ===
Brown was drafted in the second round, 18th overall, by the Montreal Alouettes in the 2022 CFL draft and signed with the team on May 13, 2022. He played in two preseason games in 2022, but was released and returned to play for the Golden Bears. He re-signed with the Alouettes for the 2023 season and again dressed in two pre-season games, but was part of the final cuts on June 3, 2023.

=== Calgary Stampeders ===
On June 19, 2023, it was announced that Brown had signed with the Calgary Stampeders to a practice roster agreement. He made his professional debut on August 25, 2023, against the Toronto Argonauts. He played in two regular season games in 2023. In 2024, Brown played in 13 regular season games, starting in one.

On May 13, 2026, Brown was released by the Stampeders.
