= Daniel Adeboboye =

Canadian gridiron football player (born 1999)

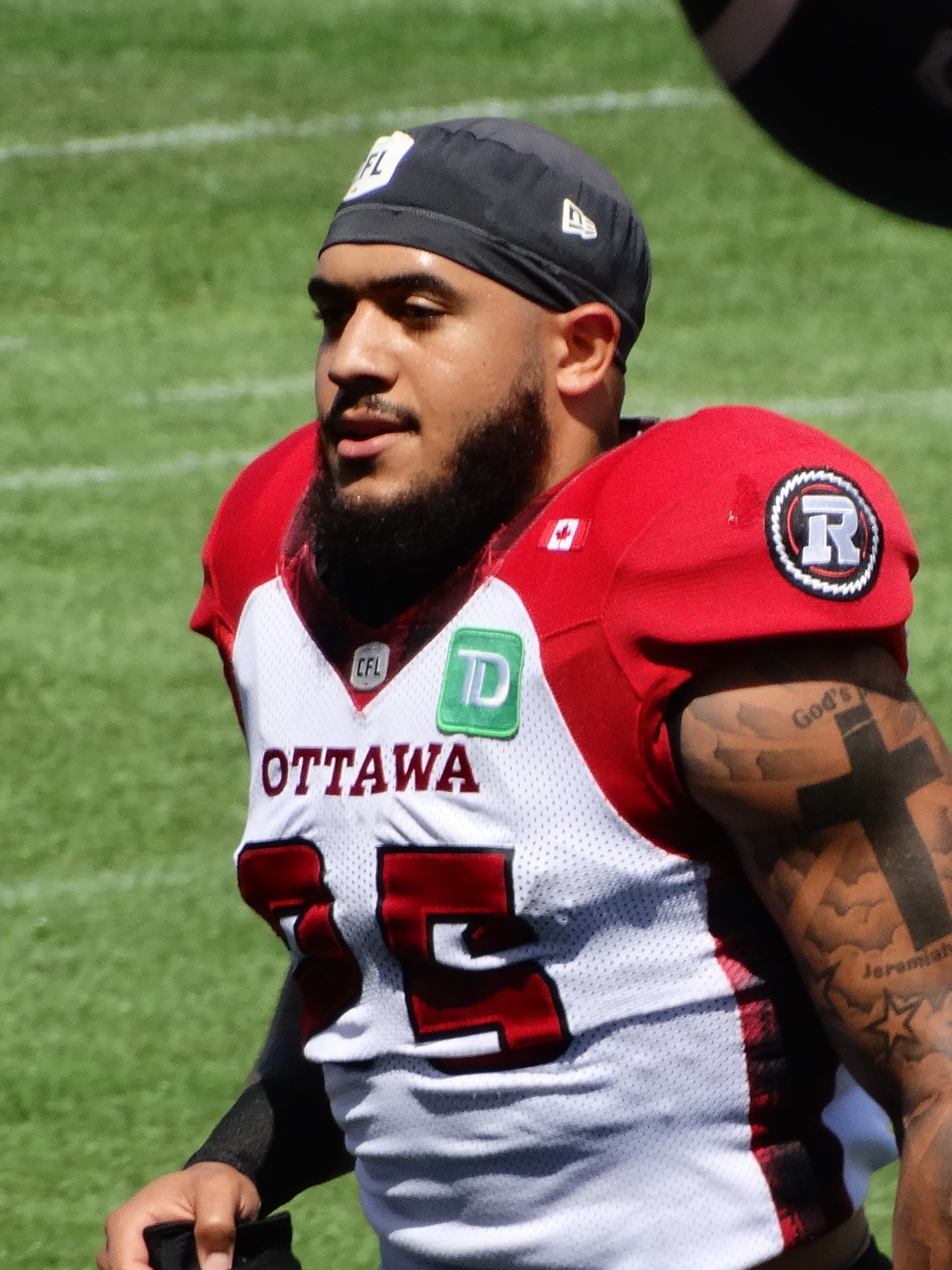
- Adeboboye with the Ottawa Redblacks in 2025

No. 25 – Ottawa Redblacks
- Position: Running back
- Roster status: Active
- CFL status: National

Personal information
- Born: May 12, 1999 (age 27); Mississauga, Ontario, Canada
- Listed height: 5 ft 8 in (1.73 m)
- Listed weight: 218 lb (99 kg)

Career information
- High school: The Hill School; Northern Secondary
- College: Bryant
- CFL draft: 2022: 2nd round, 15th overall pick

Career history
- Toronto Argonauts (2022–2024); Ottawa Redblacks (2025–present)

Awards and highlights
- 2× Grey Cup champion (2022, 2024)
- Stats at CFL.ca

Daniel Adeboboye (born May 12, 1999) is a Canadian professional football running back for the Ottawa Redblacks of the Canadian Football League (CFL).

== College career ==
Adeboboye played college football for the Bryant Bulldogs from 2018 to 2021. He played in 34 games where he had 1,816 rushing yards and 16 touchdowns along with 49 receptions for 264 yards and three touchdowns.

== Professional career ==
Pre-draft measurables
Height	Weight	40-yard dash	20-yard shuttle	Three-cone drill	Vertical jump	Broad jump	Bench press
5 ft 9 1/2 in (1.77 m)	218 lb (99 kg)	4.69 s	4.36 s	7.20 s	37.5 in (0.95 m)	10 ft 3 1/4 in (3.13 m)	28 reps
All values from CFL Combine

=== Toronto Argonauts ===
Adeboboye was ranked as the 12th best player in the Canadian Football League's Amateur Scouting Bureau final rankings for players eligible in the 2022 CFL draft. He was then drafted in the second round, 15th overall, in the 2022 draft by the Toronto Argonauts and signed with the team on May 10, 2022. Following training camp, he made the team's active roster as the backup running back to Andrew Harris and played in his first professional game on June 16, 2022, against the Montreal Alouettes, where he had three carries for ten yards. Following an injury to Harris, he had his first reception in a game, against the Hamilton Tiger-Cats, on August 12, 2022.

Adeboboye played in all 18 regular season games in 2022 where he had 15 carries for 72 yards, four receptions for 16 yards, and finished second on the team with 17 special teams tackles. He was the team's nominee for the CFL's Most Outstanding Special Teams player. He also played in both post-season games, including his first Grey Cup championship win in the 109th Grey Cup game.

In the 2023 season, Adeboboye recorded his first 100-yard rushing game on October 21, 2023, against the Saskatchewan Roughriders, when he had nine carries for 109 yards. He also scored his first touchdown in the same game when he scored on a five-yard run. In total, Adeboboye played in 17 regular season games, starting in two, where he had 41 rush attempts for 287 yards and one touchdown along with eight receptions for 71 yards and 13 special teams tackles. He did not play in the playoffs in 2023 due to injury.

In 2024, Adeboboye saw regular playing time at running back as part of a rotation with Ka'Deem Carey and Deonta McMahon. He played in all 18 regular season games where he had 63 carries for 244 yards and six catches for 40 yards. He also played in all three post-season games, including the 111th Grey Cup where he had one carry for two yards in the Argonauts' 41–24 victory over the Winnipeg Blue Bombers.

=== Ottawa Redblacks ===
On January 14, 2025, it was announced that Adeboboye had been traded to the Ottawa Redblacks in exchange for a conditional fifth-round pick in the 2026 CFL draft and a negotiation list player.

== Personal life ==
Adeboboye was born in Mississauga to parents Marian and Tai Adeboboye and grew up in Toronto. He has two brothers and a sister. He is of Nigerian descent through his father.
