= Enock Makonzo =

Canadian gridiron football player (born 1997)

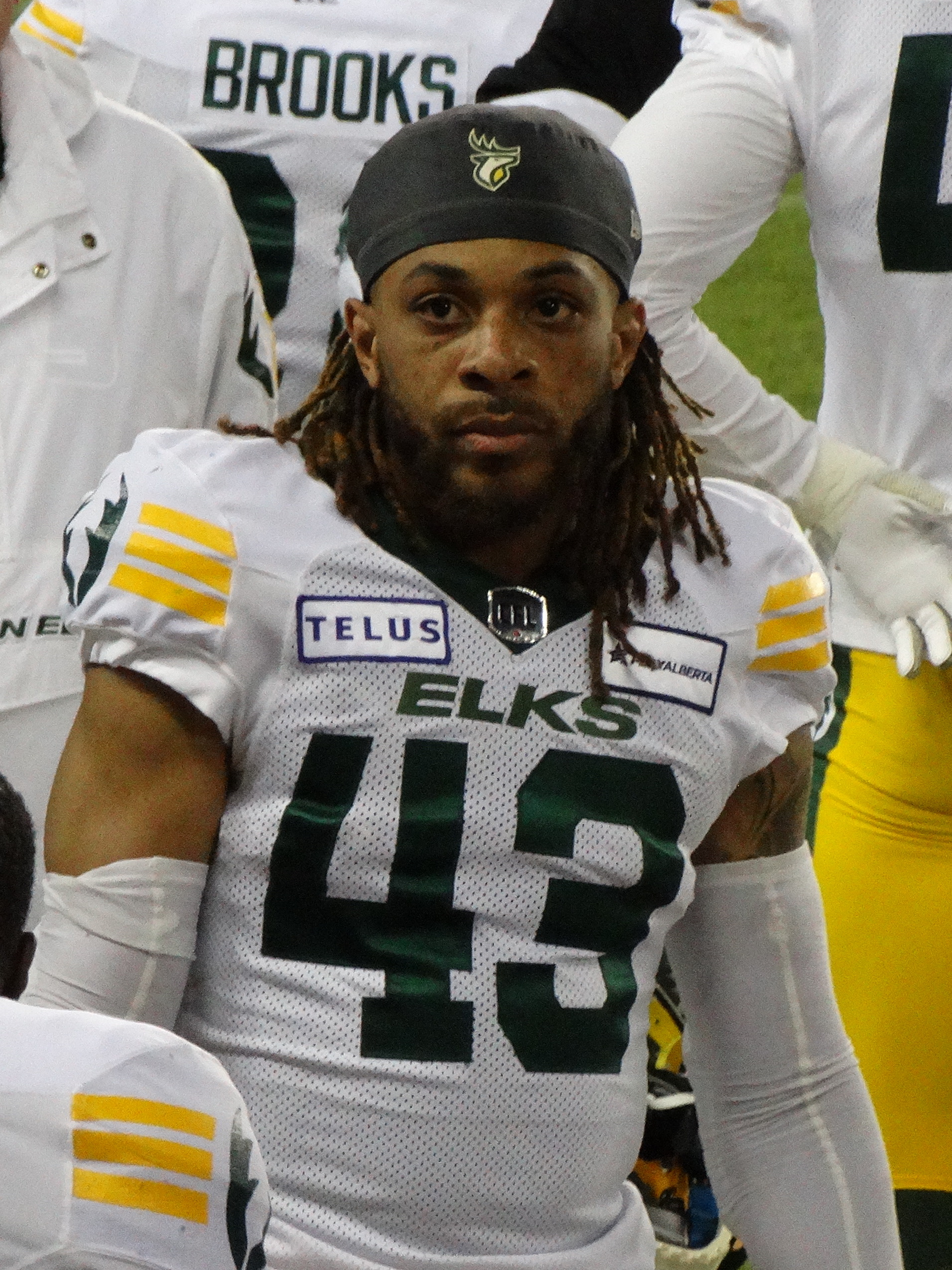
- Makonzo with the Edmonton Elks in 2023

No. 43
- Position: Linebacker

Personal information
- Born: May 1, 1997 (age 29); Lachine, Quebec, Canada
- Listed height: 5 ft 11 in (1.80 m)
- Listed weight: 195 lb (88 kg)

Career information
- High school: École secondaire Dalbé-Viau
- CEGEP: Cégep du Vieux Montréal
- College: New Mexico Military Institute; Coastal Carolina
- CFL draft: 2022: 1st round, 4th overall pick

Career history
- 2022–2023: Edmonton Elks
- 2024: Hamilton Tiger-Cats
- 2025: Winnipeg Blue Bombers
- 2026: Toronto Argonauts*
- * Offseason or practice squad member only

Career CFL statistics
- Games played: 22
- Tackles: 68
- Sacks: 2
- Forced fumbles: 2
- Stats at CFL.ca

Enock Makonzo (born May 1, 1997) is a Canadian former professional football linebacker who played in the Canadian Football League (CFL). He played college football at New Mexico Military Institute and Coastal Carolina and was selected with the fourth overall pick of the 2022 CFL draft by the Edmonton Elks.

== Early life and education ==
Makonzo was born to Congolese parents on May 1, 1997, in Lachine, Quebec. He started playing football in high-school at École secondaire Dalbé-Viau. After graduating he attended Cégep du Vieux Montréal and also was a member of Team Québec and Canada men's national football team. Although he received numerous offers from Canadian universities to play U Sports football, Makonzo decided to play in the United States at New Mexico Military Institute. He appeared in 18 games over two seasons, and posted a total of 105 tackles along with two sacks, with 71 tackles coming in his second year. After his graduation from the military school, he accepted an offer to play for the Coastal Carolina Chanticleers, over the UMass Minutemen and Southern Alabama Jaguars. He was the first Canadian player in Coastal Carolina's history.

In his second game with Coastal Carolina, against Kansas, Makonzo suffered a torn ACL that made him miss the rest of the 2019 season. He appeared in 12 games during the 2020 season, all but one as a starter, and was named third-team all-conference by Phil Steele after posting 76 tackles, 10.5 TFLs, two sacks and two forced fumbles. The following year, Makonzo recorded 71 tackles, 10.0 TFLs and a team-leading three forced fumbles on his way to being named first-team All-Sun Belt by Pro Football Focus (PFF). He was also named to the NCAA All-Canadian Team published by J. C. Abbott. He closed out his college career with a career-high 11 tackles in their Cure Bowl win and finished his stint with the school having totaled 150 tackles, 21.5 TFLs, two sacks and five forced fumbles. Although he had one year of eligibility remaining in 2022, Makonzo decided to try professional football.

== Professional career ==
=== Edmonton Elks ===
Makonzo was selected with the fourth overall pick of the 2022 CFL draft by the Edmonton Elks. Playing linebacker as a rookie, he totaled 57 tackles in 16 games (10 of which he started), tied for second on the team. He also posted two sacks, five TFLs and a forced fumble.

In 2023, Makonzo played in just five regular season games where he recorded 11 defensive tackles and one forced fumble. He was released shortly after the completion of the 2024 CFL draft on May 1, 2024.

=== Hamilton Tiger-Cats ===
On May 6, 2024, Makonzo was signed by the Hamilton Tiger-Cats. However, he spent the entire season on the injured list and did not dress in a game. He became a free agent upon the expiry of his contract on February 11, 2025.

=== Winnipeg Blue Bombers ===
On February 13, 2025, Makonzo signed with the Winnipeg Blue Bombers. He missed the entire 2025 season due to injury. His contract expired on February 10, 2026.

=== Toronto Argonauts ===
On February 18, 2026, it was announced that Makonzo had signed with the Toronto Argonauts. He retired on May 24, 2026.

== Personal life ==
Makonzo's brother, Ethan Makonzo, who played for the Montreal Carabins was selected with the 46th pick in the sixth round of the 2021 CFL draft by the Montreal Alouettes until his release and also played for a time with the Elks.
