= Keaton Bruggeling =

Canadian gridiron football player (born 1998)

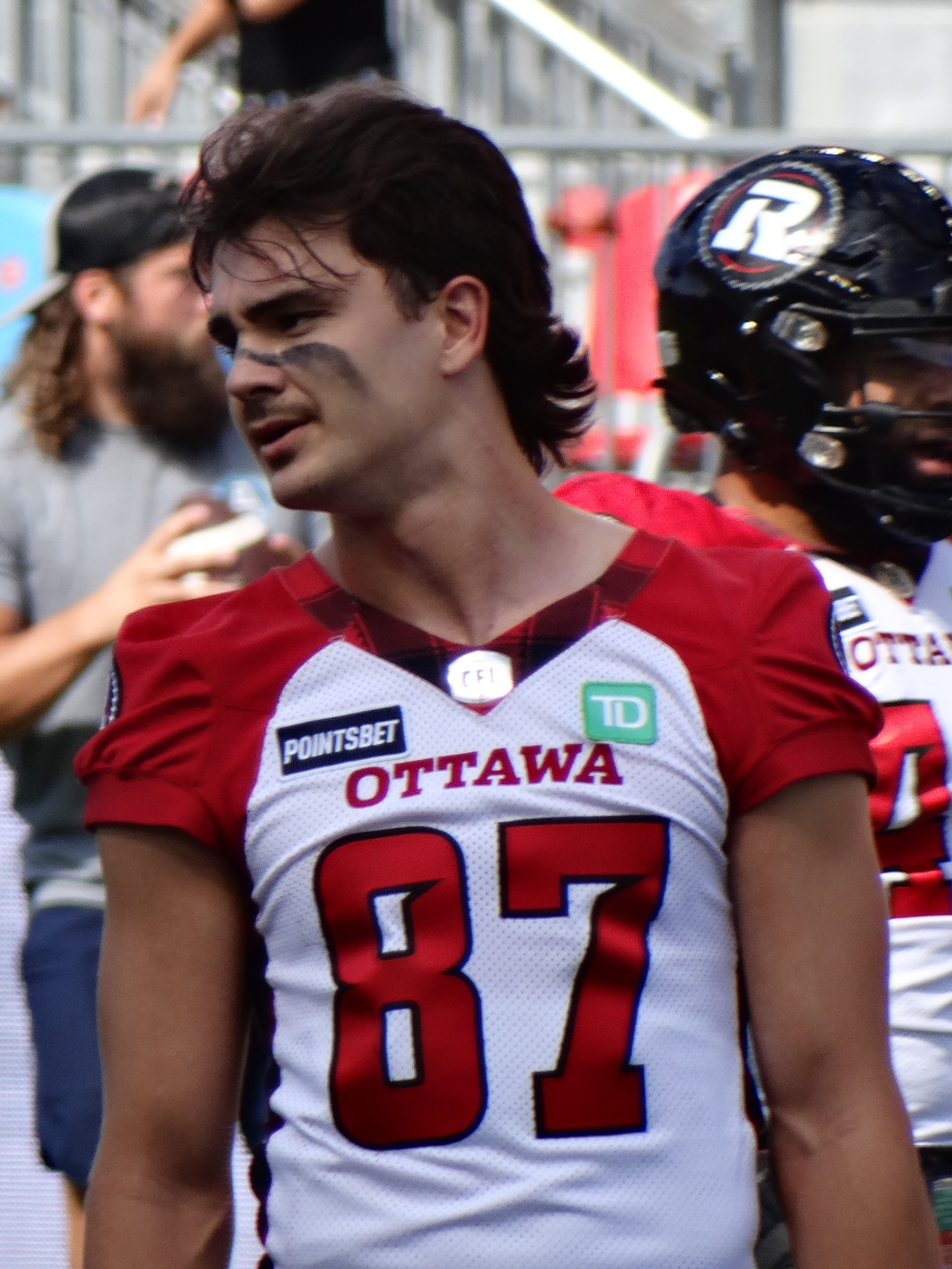
- Bruggeling with the Ottawa Redblacks in 2022

Profile
- Position: Wide receiver

Personal information
- Born: October 23, 1998 (age 28); St. Catharines, Ontario, Canada
- Listed height: 6 ft 3 in (1.91 m)
- Listed weight: 205 lb (93 kg)

Career information
- High school: Eden (St. Catharines, ON)
- University: Carleton
- CFL draft: 2022: 3rd round, 22nd overall pick

Career history
- 2022–2024: Ottawa Redblacks
- 2025: Hamilton Tiger-Cats
- Stats at CFL.ca

Keaton Bruggeling (born October 23, 1998) is a Canadian professional football wide receiver. He most recently played for the Hamilton Tiger-Cats of the Canadian Football League (CFL). He played U Sports football at Carleton.

== Early life ==
Bruggeling played high school football at Eden High School in St. Catharines, Ontario. He also played junior football for the Niagara Spears.

== University career ==
Bruggeling played U Sports football at Carleton. In 2021, he caught 17 passes for 225 yards and three touchdowns.

== Professional career ==
Pre-draft measurables
Height	Weight	40-yard dash	20-yard shuttle	Three-cone drill	Vertical jump	Broad jump	Bench press
6 ft 3 1/8 in (1.91 m)	212 lb (96 kg)	4.55 s	4.33 s	7.12 s	37.5 in (0.95 m)	10 ft 3 5/8 in (3.14 m)	8 reps
All values from CFL Combine

=== Ottawa Redblacks ===
Bruggeling was selected by the Ottawa Redblacks of the Canadian Football League (CFL) in the third round, with the 22nd overall pick, of the 2022 CFL draft. He signed with the team on May 9, 2022. He was moved between the practice roster and active roster several times during the 2022 season. Overall, Bruggeling dressed in eight games in 2022, recording five receptions for 44 yards. Like the previous year, he was moved between the practice roster and active roster several times during the 2023 season. Overall, he dressed for 10 games in 2023, catching one pass for 16 yards and a touchdown.

In 2024, Bruggeling played in 13 regular season games where he had two receptions for 23 yards. He became a free agent upon the expiry of his contract on February 11, 2025.

=== Hamilton Tiger-Cats ===
On February 14, 2025, Bruggeling signed with the Hamilton Tiger-Cats. He played in nine regular season games where he had seven receptions for 63 yards. He was released early in 2026 training camp on May 13, 2026.

== Bobsled career ==
Bruggeling is a bobsledder during the CFL offseason. He competed for Canada in the four-man bobsleigh event at the 2026 Winter Olympics.
