= Kiondré Smith =

Canadian gridiron football player (born 2000)

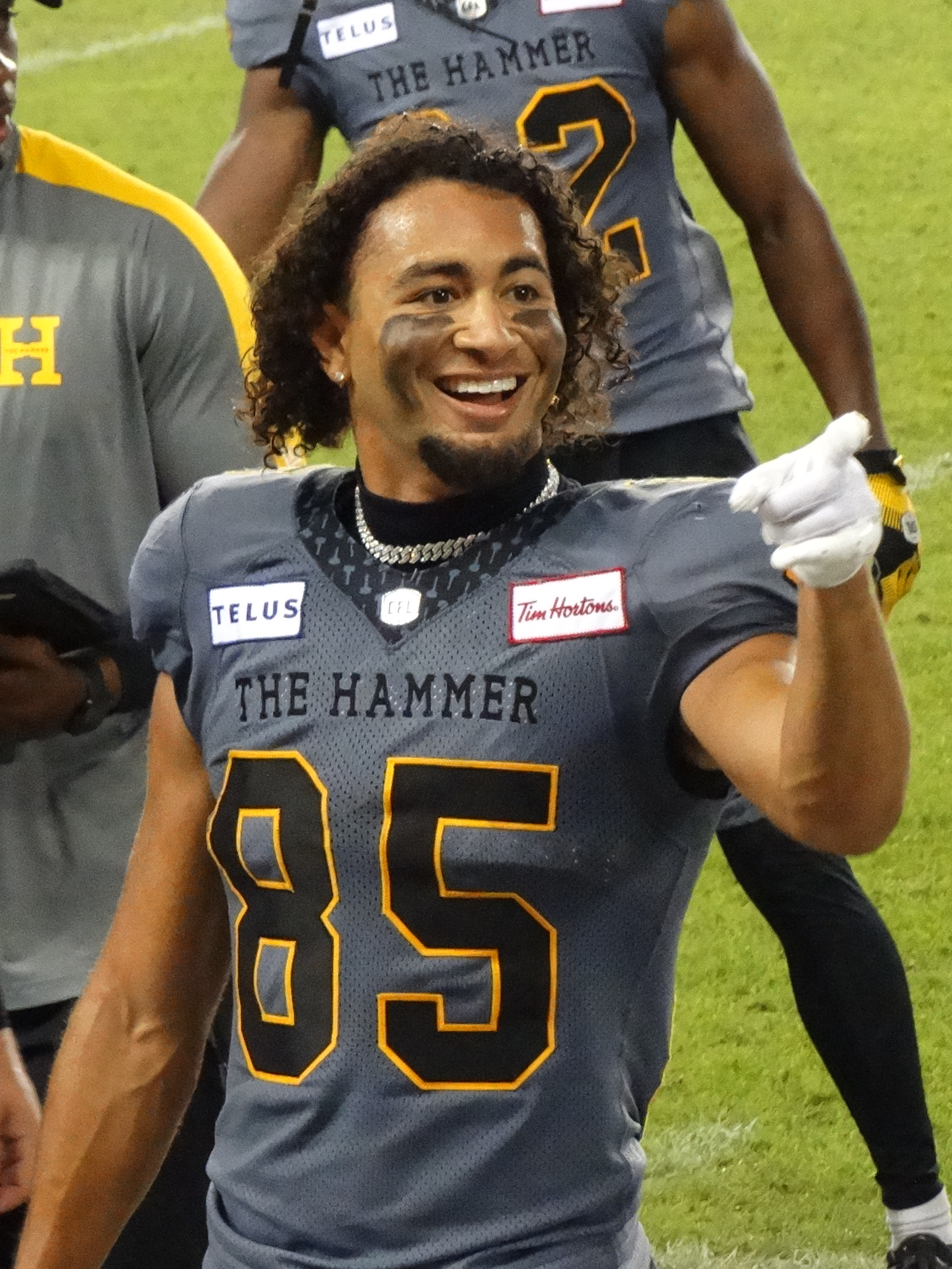
- Smith with the Hamilton Tiger-Cats in 2024

No. 85 – Hamilton Tiger-Cats
- Position: Wide receiver
- Roster status: Active
- CFL status: National

Personal information
- Born: January 3, 2000 (age 26); Scarborough, Ontario, Canada
- Listed height: 6 ft 1 in (1.85 m)
- Listed weight: 180 lb (82 kg)

Career information
- College: Guelph
- CFL draft: 2022: 4th round, 37th overall pick

Career history
- 2022–present: Hamilton Tiger-Cats

Awards and highlights
- CFL East All-Star (2025); First-team All-Canadian, returner (2021); Second-team All-Canadian, receiver (2021)
- Stats at CFL.ca

Kiondré Smith (born January 3, 2000) is a Canadian professional football wide receiver with the Hamilton Tiger-Cats of the Canadian Football League (CFL).

== University career ==
Smith played U Sports football for the Guelph Gryphons from 2018 to 2021. He played in 25 games where he recorded 50 receptions for 612 yards and five touchdowns, 45 kickoff returns for 822 yards, and 112 punt returns for 1,065 yards and one touchdown.

== Professional career ==
Pre-draft measurables
Height	Weight	40-yard dash	20-yard shuttle	Three-cone drill	Vertical jump	Broad jump	Bench press
6 ft 0 1/2 in (1.84 m)	192 lb (87 kg)	4.69 s	4.45 s	7.19 s	32.5 in (0.83 m)	9 ft 9 5/8 in (2.99 m)	4 reps
All values from CFL Combine

Smith was selected in the fourth round, 37th overall, by the Hamilton Tiger-Cats in the 2022 CFL draft and signed with the team on May 9, 2022. Following training camp in 2022, he made the team's active roster and made his professional debut on June 11, 2022, against the Saskatchewan Roughriders. He also became the first player born in the 21st century to have played for the Tiger-Cats. Smith recorded his first reception on July 28, 2022, against the Montreal Alouettes in week 8. He then made his first professional start at receiver on August 12, 2022, against the Toronto Argonauts where he had four receptions for 39 yards. On September 17, 2022, Smith scored his first touchdown on a 54-yard pass from Dane Evans in a victory against the Winnipeg Blue Bombers. He played in all 18 regular season games, starting in eight, where he had 17 catches for 247 yards and one touchdown and one two-point convert.

In 2023, Smith had a more expanded role on offense as he played in 18 regular season games, starting in 15, where he had 56 receptions for 701 yards. He also had his first 100-yard receiving game and set single-game career highs on September 23, 2023, when he recorded nine catches for 156 yards in the team's loss to the Argonauts. He also made his post-season debut in the 2023 East Semi-Final loss to the Alouettes where he had four catches for 31 yards.

== Personal life ==
Kiondré Smith is the son of Adrion Smith, who played in the CFL as a defensive back for 12 seasons.
