= Joshua Archibald (Canadian football) =

Canadian gridiron football player (born 1997)

- Archibald with the Montreal Alouettes in 2026

No. 97 – Montreal Alouettes
- Position: Defensive lineman
- Roster status: Active
- CFL status: National

Personal information
- Born: December 4, 1997 (age 28); Montreal, Quebec, Canada
- Listed height: 6 ft 3 in (1.91 m)
- Listed weight: 240 lb (109 kg)

Career information
- University: McGill
- CFL draft: 2022: 3rd round, 23rd overall pick

Career history
- 2022–2024: BC Lions
- 2025–present: Montreal Alouettes

Career CFL statistics as of 2026
- Games played: 73
- Defensive tackles: 40
- Spec. team tackles: 39
- Sacks: 6
- Interceptions: 1
- Forced fumbles: 3
- Stats at CFL.ca

Joshua Archibald (born December 4, 1997) is a Canadian professional football defensive lineman for the Montreal Alouettes of the Canadian Football League (CFL).

== University career ==
Archibald played U Sports football for the McGill Redbirds from 2017 to 2021. He played in 28 games where he had 66 combined tackles, 10.5 sacks, five forced fumbles, and two fumble recoveries. He did not play in 2020 due to the cancellation of the 2020 U Sports football season and chose to defer his eligibility to the 2022 CFL draft.

== Professional career ==
Pre-draft measurables
Height	Weight	40-yard dash	20-yard shuttle	Three-cone drill	Vertical jump	Broad jump	Bench press
6 ft 2 1/4 in (1.89 m)	246 lb (112 kg)	4.77 s	4.30 s	7.25 s	32.5 in (0.83 m)	9 ft 1 in (2.77 m)	22 reps
All values from CFL Combine

=== BC Lions ===
Archibald was drafted in the third round, 23rd overall, by the BC Lions in the 2022 CFL draft and signed with the team on May 11, 2022. Following training camp, he was placed on the team's practice roster, but was promoted to the active roster soon after and made his professional debut on July 21, 2022, against the Hamilton Tiger-Cats. Archibald played in 10 regular season games where he recorded one special teams tackle. He also played in his first post-season game on November 6, 2022, against the Calgary Stampeders.

In 2023, Archibald made the team's opening day roster as a backup defensive lineman. He became a free agent upon the expiry of his contract on February 11, 2025.

=== Montreal Alouettes ===
On February 11, 2025, it was announced that Archibald had signed with the Montreal Alouettes.
