= Woodly Appolon =

Canadian gridiron football player (born 1999)

- Appolon with the Edmonton Elks in 2023

No. 35 – BC Lions
- Position: Linebacker
- Roster status: Active
- CFL status: National

Personal information
- Born: July 26, 1996 (age 30); Montreal, Quebec, Canada
- Listed height: 6 ft 4 in (1.93 m)
- Listed weight: 220 lb (100 kg)

Career information
- High school: Collège Montmorency (Montreal, Quebec)
- College: Highland (2018); Butler (2019); Northern Illinois (2020); Tuskegee (2021–2022)
- CFL draft: 2022: 5th round, 40th overall pick

Career history
- Edmonton Elks (2023–2024); Ottawa Redblacks (2025)*; BC Lions (2025–present)
- * Offseason or practice squad member only
- Stats at CFL.ca

Woodly Appolon (born July 26, 1996) is a Canadian professional football linebacker for the BC Lions of the Canadian Football League (CFL).

== University career ==
Appolon played college football for the Highland Scotties in 2018, the Butler Grizzlies in 2019, the Northern Illinois Huskies in 2020, and the Tuskegee Golden Tigers from 2021 to 2022.

== Professional career ==
Appolon was selected by the Ottawa Redblacks in the fifth round, 40th overall, in the 2022 CFL draft, but returned to university for his last year of playing eligibility.

=== Edmonton Elks ===
On February 27, 2023, Appolon's playing rights were traded to the Edmonton Elks, where his twin brother, Wesly, was playing, in exchange for the 12th overall pick in the 2023 CFL draft. He signed with the Elks on April 20, 2023. He made the active roster following training camp in 2023 and made his professional debut on June 11, 2023, against the Saskatchewan Roughriders. He played in eight games that year where he recorded four special teams tackles.

In 2024, Appolon made the team's active roster following training camp and played in the team's first nine games where he recorded one special teams tackle. He was demoted to the practice roster on August 16, 2024, and was later released on September 12, 2024.

=== Ottawa Redblacks ===
Appolon remained unsigned in the 2025 offseason and was eventually signed to a practice roster agreement with the Ottawa Redblacks on September 2, 2025. He did not dress in a game and was later released on September 16, 2025.

=== BC Lions ===
On September 22, 2025, Appolon was signed by the BC Lions. He played in the last four games of the regular season where he had one special teams tackle.

Appolon made the team's active roster following training camp in 2026. On September 11, 2026, Appolon was placed on the Lions' 6-game injured list. He rejoined the active roster on October 30, 2026, ahead of the Western Semi-Final.
