= Tyrell Richards =

Canadian gridiron football player (born 1998)

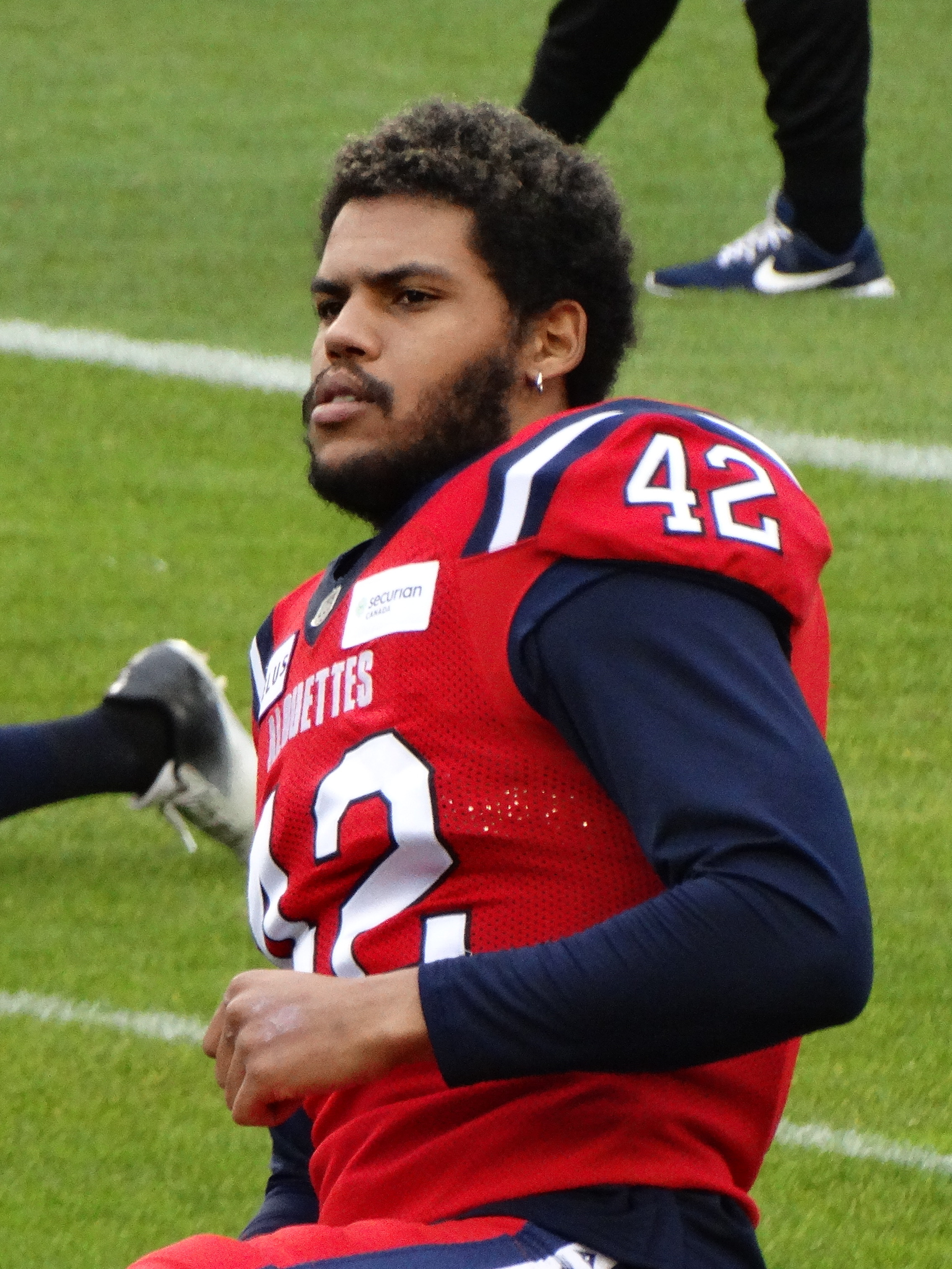
- Richards with the Montreal Alouettes in 2023

No. 42 – Montreal Alouettes
- Position: Linebacker
- Roster status: Active
- CFL status: National

Personal information
- Born: October 7, 1998 (age 28); Ottawa, Ontario, Canada
- Listed height: 6 ft 4 in (1.93 m)
- Listed weight: 242 lb (110 kg)

Career information
- High school: Clarkson Secondary (Mississauga, ON)
- College: Syracuse
- CFL draft: 2022: 1st round, 1st overall pick

Career history
- Montreal Alouettes (2022–present)

Awards and highlights
- Grey Cup champion (2023); CFL East All-Star (2025)

Career CFL statistics as of 2026
- Total tackles: 111
- Sacks: 2
- Forced fumbles: 3
- Fumble recoveries: 1
- Interceptions: 1
- Defensive touchdowns: 1
- Stats at CFL.ca

Tyrell Joseph Richards (born October 7, 1998) is a Canadian professional football linebacker for the Montreal Alouettes of the Canadian Football League (CFL). He was drafted first overall by the Alouettes in the 2022 CFL draft.

== College career ==
After using a redshirt year in 2017, Richards played college football for the Syracuse Orange from 2018 to 2020. He entered the transfer portal with the intention of moving to a different school, but was unable due to non-transferable school credits. He did not play in 2021 and instead trained and coached at his high school, Clarkson Secondary School.

== Professional career ==
Pre-draft measurables
Height	Weight	40-yard dash	20-yard shuttle	Three-cone drill	Vertical jump	Broad jump	Bench press
6 ft 3 1/2 in (1.92 m)	232 lb (105 kg)	4.60 s	4.25 s	7.01 s	37.0 in (0.94 m)	9 ft 10 7/8 in (3.02 m)	19 reps
All values from CFL Combine

Richards was ranked as the third best player in the Canadian Football League's Amateur Scouting Bureau final rankings for players eligible in the 2022 CFL draft. He was then drafted with the first overall pick in the draft after the Montreal Alouettes traded up in order to select him. On May 13, 2022, it was announced that Richards had signed his rookie contract with the Alouettes. He played in seven regular season games, starting in two, where he had five defensive tackles and four special teams tackles.

In 2023, he played in 11 regular season games, sitting out seven due to injury, and had ten defensive tackles, 11 special teams tackles, one interception, one forced fumble, and one fumble recovery.

== Personal life ==
Richards was born in Ottawa, Ontario, to parents Anik and Nick Richards. He has two sisters and he grew up in Brampton, Ontario.
