= Zach Lindley =

Canadian gridiron football player (born 1999)

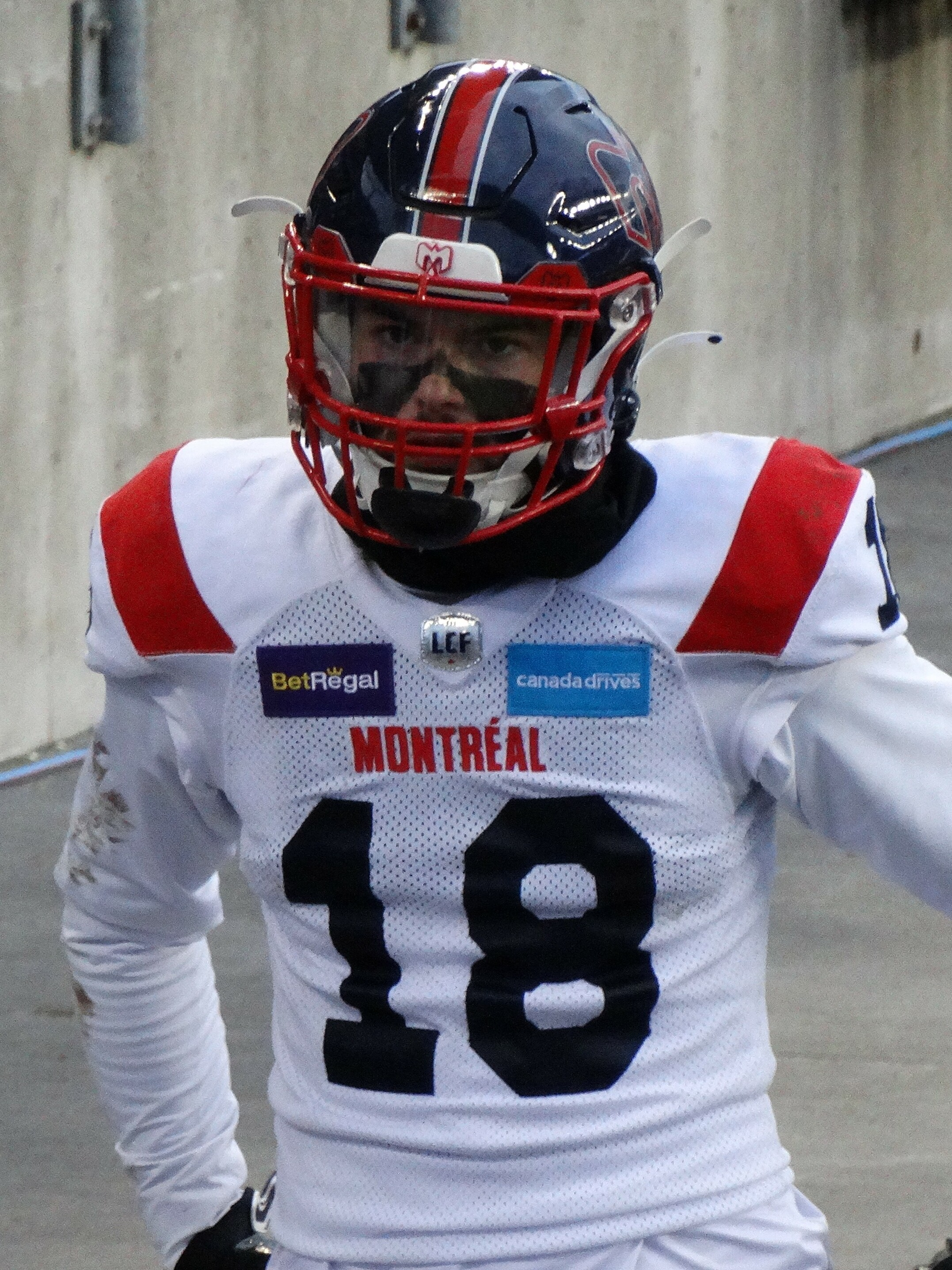
- Lindley with the Montreal Alouettes in 2022

No. 18
- Position: Defensive back

Personal information
- Born: November 9, 1999 (age 26); Chatham-Kent, Ontario, Canada
- Listed height: 5 ft 11 in (1.80 m)
- Listed weight: 190 lb (86 kg)

Career information
- University: Western
- CFL draft: 2022: 8th round, 69th overall pick

Career history
- 2022–2023: Montreal Alouettes

Awards and highlights
- Grey Cup champion (2023); Vanier Cup champion (2017)
- Stats at CFL.ca

Zach Lindley (born November 9, 1999) is a Canadian former professional football defensive back who played two seasons with the Montreal Alouettes of the Canadian Football League (CFL).

== University career ==
Lindley played U Sports football for the Western Mustangs from 2017 to 2021. He used a redshirt season in 2017 as the team won the 53rd Vanier Cup championship. He was also a member of the 2021 Vanier Cup championship team.

== Professional career ==
Lindley was drafted in the eighth round, 69th overall, by the Montreal Alouettes in the 2022 CFL draft and signed with the team on May 13, 2022. Following training camp, he began the season on the practice roster, but made his professional debut on July 2, 2022, against the Saskatchewan Roughriders where he had two special teams tackles. He played in 12 of the next 15 games, missing three due to injury, where he recorded one defensive tackle and 13 special teams tackles.

In 2023, Lindley played in 11 regular season games where he had one defensive tackle and nine special teams tackles. He was injured late in the season and did not dress in the Grey Cup game as the Alouettes defeated the Winnipeg Blue Bombers in the 110th Grey Cup championship. He announced his retirement on January 18, 2024.
