= 2022 CFL draft =

Canadian football draft

General information
- Sport: Canadian football
- Date: May 3, 2022
- Time: 8:00 pm EDT
- Location: Toronto
- Network: TSN/RDS

Overview
- 74 total selections in 8 rounds
- League: CFL
- Territorial pick: 2
- First selection: Tyrell Richards, LB, Montreal Alouettes
- Most selections (10): Edmonton Elks
- Fewest selections (6): Hamilton Tiger-Cats
- U Sports selections: 60
- NCAA selections: 14

The 2022 CFL national draft was a selection of national players by Canadian Football League (CFL) teams that took place on May 3, 2022, at 8:00 pm ET and was broadcast on TSN and RDS. 74 players were chosen from among eligible players from Canadian Universities across the country, as well as Canadian players playing in the NCAA.

The draft was broadcast live on TSN for the first two rounds. The TSN production was hosted by Farhan Lalji and featured the CFL on TSN panel which included Duane Forde, Davis Sanchez, Marshall Ferguson, and Dave Naylor. Randy Ambrosie, the CFL commissioner, was also present in the TSN studios in Toronto to announce the picks for the first two rounds.

== Available players ==
Due to U Sports cancelling all play in 2020, 132 eligible 2021 draftees exercised their right to defer their draft years to this year's draft. However, the league also permitted NCAA redshirt juniors to be selected in the 2021 draft to balance out the influx of players to this year's draft.

== Top prospects ==
Source: CFL Scouting Bureau rankings.

Final ranking	January ranking	September ranking	Player	Position	University	Hometown
1	–	–	John Metchie III	Wide receiver	Alabama	Brampton, ON
2	1	4	Jesse Luketa	Linebacker	Penn State	Ottawa, ON
3	4	2	Tyrell Richards	Linebacker	Syracuse	Brampton, ON
4	6	9	Tre Ford	Quarterback	Waterloo	Niagara Falls, ON
5	2	7	Jalen Philpot	Wide receiver	Calgary	Delta, BC
6	5	15	Tyson Philpot	Wide receiver	Calgary	Delta, BC
7	7	–	Deionte Knight	Defensive lineman	Western	Ajax, ON
8	3	6	Enock Makonzo	Defensive back	Coastal Carolina	Lachine, QC
9	9	12	Tyrell Ford	Defensive back	Waterloo	Niagara Falls, ON
10	10	20	Noah Zerr	Offensive lineman	Saskatchewan	Langenburg, SK
11	–	–	Samuel Emilus	Wide receiver	Louisiana Tech	Montreal, QC
12	–	–	Daniel Adeboboye	Running back	Bryant	Toronto, ON
13	–	–	Rodeem Brown	Offensive lineman	Alberta	Halifax, NS
14	8	13	Zack Fry	Offensive lineman	Western	London, ON
15	–	–	Zach Pelehos	Offensive lineman	Ottawa	Gananoque, ON
16	11	14	Peter Kozushka	Offensive lineman	Alberta	Yorkton, SK
17	15	–	Anthony Federico	Defensive lineman	Queen's	Niagara Falls, ON
18	–	–	Cyrille Hogan-Saindon	Offensive lineman	Laval	Quebec City, QC
19	–	–	Gregor MacKellar	Offensive lineman	St. Francis Xavier	Timberlea, NS
20	16	–	Nathan Cherry	Defensive lineman	Saskatchewan	Saskatoon, SK
–	12	19	Jayden Dalke	Defensive back	Alberta	Leduc, AB
–	13	18	Adam Machart	Running back	Saskatchewan	Saskatoon, SK
–	14	–	Josiah Schakel	Defensive back	Alberta	Sherwood Park, AB
–	17	–	Joshua Archibald	Defensive lineman	McGill	Montreal, QC
–	18	–	Nate Edwards	Defensive lineman	McMaster	Ancaster, ON
–	19	–	Zach Herzog	Defensive back	Hillsdale	Windsor, ON
–	20	16	Shaquille St-Lot	Defensive back	Maine	Montreal, QC
–	–	1	Dontae Bull	Offensive lineman	Fresno State	Victoria, BC
–	–	3	Sidy Sow	Offensive lineman	Eastern Michigan	Bromont, QC
–	–	5	Sydney Brown	Defensive back	Illinois	London, ON
–	–	8	Tavius Robinson	Defensive lineman	Mississippi	Guelph, ON
–	–	10	Jonathan Sutherland	Defensive back	Penn State	Ottawa, ON
–	–	11	Samuel Emilus	Wide receiver	Louisiana Tech	Montreal, QC
–	–	17	Lwal Uguak	Defensive lineman	Connecticut	Edmonton, AB

- Note: Dontae Bull, Sidy Sow, Sydney Brown, Tavius Robinson, Jonathan Sutherland, and Lwal Uguak deferred their draft years to 2023 in order to return for their senior years at school.

== Draft order ==
=== Round one ===
Pick #	CFL team	Player	Position	University
1	Montreal Alouettes (via Edmonton)	Tyrell Richards	LB	Syracuse
2	Ottawa Redblacks	Zach Pelehos	OL	Ottawa
3	BC Lions	Nathan Cherry	DL	Saskatchewan
4	Edmonton Elks (via Montreal)	Enock Makonzo	DB	Coastal Carolina
5	Calgary Stampeders	Jalen Philpot	WR	Calgary
6	Toronto Argonauts	Gregor MacKellar	OL	St. Francis Xavier
7	Saskatchewan Roughriders	Samuel Emilus	WR	Louisiana Tech
8	Edmonton Elks (via Hamilton)	Tre Ford	QB	Waterloo
9	Montreal Alouettes (via Winnipeg)	Tyson Philpot	WR	Calgary

=== Round two ===
Pick #	CFL team	Player	Position	University
10	Toronto Argonauts (via Edmonton)	Deionte Knight	DL	Western Ontario
11	Ottawa Redblacks	Cyrille Hogan-Saindon	OL	Laval
12	BC Lions	Noah Zerr	OL	Saskatchewan
13	Winnipeg Blue Bombers (via Montreal)	Tyrell Ford	DB	Waterloo
14	Calgary Stampeders	Josiah Schakel	DB	Alberta
15	Toronto Argonauts	Daniel Adeboboye	RB	Bryant
16	Saskatchewan Roughriders	Zack Fry	OL	Western Ontario
17	Hamilton Tiger-Cats	Anthony Federico	DL	Queen's
18	Montreal Alouettes (via Winnipeg)	Rodeem Brown	OL	Alberta
19T	Edmonton Elks	Jacob Plamondon	DL	Calgary
20T	Ottawa Redblacks	Jesse Luketa	LB	Penn State

=== Round three ===
Pick #	CFL team	Player	Position	University
21	Edmonton Elks	Marc-David Bien-Aime	OL	Fresno State
22	Ottawa Redblacks	Keaton Bruggeling	WR	Carleton
23	BC Lions	Joshua Archibald	DL	McGill
24	Montreal Alouettes	Vincent Forbes-Mombleau	WR	Laval
25	Calgary Stampeders	Demetri Royer	DB	Western Illinois
26	Toronto Argonauts	Enoch Penney-Laryea	DL	McMaster
27	Saskatchewan Roughriders	Diego Alatorre Montoya	OL	British Columbia
28	Edmonton Elks (via Hamilton)	Peter Adjey	LS	Queen's
29	BC Lions (via Winnipeg)	Ryder Varga	LB	Regina

=== Round four ===
Pick #	CFL team	Player	Position	University
30	Edmonton Elks	Gavin Cobb	WR	Manitoba
31	Ottawa Redblacks	Daniel Valente	DB	Western Ontario
32	BC Lions	Adrian Greene	DB	Saint Mary's
33	Montreal Alouettes	Tysen-Otis Copeland	DB	Montreal
34	Calgary Stampeders	Jacob Butler	OL	Queen's
35	Toronto Argonauts	Braydon Noll	OL	Wilfrid Laurier
36	Saskatchewan Roughriders	Tommy Bringi	LB	Wilfrid Laurier
37	Hamilton Tiger-Cats	Kiondre Smith	WR	Guelph
38	Winnipeg Blue Bombers	Cole Adamson	DL	Manitoba

=== Round five ===
Pick #	CFL team	Player	Position	University
39	Edmonton Elks	Wesly Appolon	LB	Tuskegee
40	Ottawa Redblacks	Woodly Appolon	LB	Tuskegee
41	BC Lions	Riley Pickett	DL	Saskatchewan
42	Montreal Alouettes	Ryth-Jean Giraud	RB	Montreal
43	Calgary Stampeders	Joel Braden	OL	Regina
44	Toronto Argonauts	Daniel Kwamou	LB	British Columbia
45	Saskatchewan Roughriders	Tristan Fleury	DB	McGill
46	Hamilton Tiger-Cats	Jared Beeksma	LB	Guelph
47	Winnipeg Blue Bombers	Chris Ciguineau	DB	Ottawa

=== Round six ===
Pick #	CFL team	Player	Position	University
48	Edmonton Elks	Jeremie Dominique	DB	Charleston
49	Ottawa Redblacks	Subomi Oyesoro	LB	Calgary
50	BC Lions	Frednick Eveillard	WR	Ottawa
51	Montreal Alouettes	Peter Kozushka	OL	Alberta
52	Calgary Stampeders	Rasheed Tucker	RB	Queen's
53	Toronto Argonauts	Eric Sutton	DB	Texas State
54	Saskatchewan Roughriders	Jayden Dalke	DE	Alberta
55	Hamilton Tiger-Cats	Khadeem Pierre	DB	Concordia
56	Winnipeg Blue Bombers	Jeremy Kapelanski	DL	Guelph

=== Round seven ===
Pick #	CFL team	Player	Position	University
57	Edmonton Elks	Jean-Paul Cimankinda	RB	Ottawa
58	Ottawa Redblacks	Connor Ross	TE	St. Francis Xavier
59	BC Lions	John Metchie III	WR	Alabama
60	Montreal Alouettes	Yanis Chihat	LB	Laval
61	Calgary Stampeders	Shaquille St-Lot	DB	Maine
62	Toronto Argonauts	Chase Arseneau	TE	McMaster
63	Saskatchewan Roughriders	Zach Herzog	DB	Hillsdale
64	Hamilton Tiger-Cats	Nicolas Guay	OL	Laval
65	Winnipeg Blue Bombers	Cedrick Lavigne	DB	Carleton

=== Round eight ===
Pick #	CFL team	Player	Position	University
66	Edmonton Elks	Nate Edwards	LB	McMaster
67	Ottawa Redblacks	Luca Perrier	RB	Laval
68	BC Lions	Adam Wallace	DL	Ottawa
69	Montreal Alouettes	Zach Lindley	LB	Western Ontario
70	Calgary Stampeders	Daniel Amoako	DB	York
71	Toronto Argonauts	Michael Pezzuto	DE	Ottawa
72	Saskatchewan Roughriders	Riley Boersma	WR	Regina
73	Hamilton Tiger-Cats	Jaxon Ciraolo-Brown	DB	British Columbia
74	Winnipeg Blue Bombers	Konner Burtenshaw	FB	Queen's

== Supplemental Draft ==
On May 5, two days after the draft, a supplemental draft was held, with the Edmonton Elks and Calgary Stampeders both forfeiting second round picks in the 2023 CFL draft to select J-Min Pelley and T. J. Rayam, respectively.

== Trades ==
In the explanations below, (D) denotes trades that took place during the draft, while (PD) indicates trades completed pre-draft.

=== Round one ===
- Edmonton ←→ Montreal (PD). Edmonton traded the first overall selection in this draft to Montreal in exchange for the fourth overall selection in this draft and the playing rights for Carter O'Donnell.
- Hamilton → Edmonton (PD). Hamilton traded the eighth overall selection in this draft, the 28th overall selection in this draft, and the ninth overall selection in the 2022 CFL global draft to Edmonton in exchange for Kyle Saxelid, Grant McDonald, and the second overall selection in the 2022 CFL global draft.
- Winnipeg → Montreal (PD). Winnipeg traded the ninth overall selection in this draft and the 18th overall selection in this draft to Montreal in exchange for Cameron Lawson and the 13th overall selection in this draft.

=== Round two ===
- Edmonton → Toronto (PD). Edmonton traded this selection and the rights to a negotiation list player (Chad Kelly) to Toronto in exchange for Nick Arbuckle. The selection would have been a third-round pick, but it was upgraded to a second-round pick when Arbuckle re-signed with the Edmonton Elks through the 2022 season.
- Winnipeg ←→ Montreal (PD). Winnipeg traded the 18th overall selection in this draft and the ninth overall selection in this draft to Montreal in exchange for Cameron Lawson and the 13th overall selection in this draft.

=== Round three ===
- Winnipeg → BC (PD). Winnipeg traded a conditional fourth-round selection to BC in exchange for Sergio Castillo. This selection was upgraded to a third-round pick and confirmed upon the release of the draft order.
- Hamilton → Edmonton (PD). Hamilton traded the 28th overall selection in this draft, the eighth overall selection in this draft, and the ninth overall selection in the 2022 CFL global draft to Edmonton in exchange for Kyle Saxelid, Grant McDonald, and the second overall selection in the 2022 CFL global draft.

== See also ==
- 2022 CFL global draft
