= List of Canadians in the National Football League =

== Active players ==
Player	Position	Team(s)	Birthplace	High school	College
Isaiah Adams	Guard	Arizona Cardinals (2024–present)	Ajax, ON	McLellan Catholic (ON)	Wilfrid Laurier Garden City CC Illinois
Elic Ayomanor	Wide receiver	Tennessee Titans (2025–present)	Medicine Hat, AB	Deerfield Academy (MA)	Stanford
Theo Benedet	Offensive lineman	Chicago Bears (2024–present)	Toronto, ON	Handsworth SS	UBC
Matthew Bergeron	Guard	Atlanta Falcons (2023–present)	Victoriaville, QC	Cegep Thetford (PQ)	Syracuse
Chase Brown	Running back	Cincinnati Bengals (2023–present)	London, ON	St. Stephen's (FL)	WMU, Illinois
Sydney Brown	Safety	Philadelphia Eagles (2023–present)	London, ON	St. Stephen's (FL)	Illinois
Neville Gallimore	Nose tackle	Dallas Cowboys (2020–2023); Miami Dolphins (2024); Los Angeles Rams (2024); Indianapolis Colts (2025–present)	Ottawa, ON	Canada Prep (ON)	Oklahoma
Michael Hoecht	Defensive end	Los Angeles Rams (2020–2025); Buffalo Bills (2025–present)	Oakville, ON	Oakwood (OH)	Brown
Jevon Holland	Safety	Miami Dolphins (2021–present); New York Giants (2025–present)	Coquitlam, BC	Bishop O'Dowd (CA)	Oregon
Chuba Hubbard	Running back	Carolina Panthers (2021–present)	Edmonton, AB	Bev Facey (AB)	OK State
Alaric Jackson	Offensive tackle	Los Angeles Rams (2021–present)	Windsor, ON	Renaissance (MI)	Iowa
Theo Johnson	Tight end	New York Giants (2024–present)	Winnipeg, MB	Holy Names (ON)	Penn State
Nikola Kalinic	Tight end	Indianapolis Colts (2022); Los Angeles Rams (2023–2024); Atlanta Falcons (2025–present)	Toronto, ON	Silverthorn (ON)	York
Deane Leonard	Cornerback	Los Angeles Chargers (2022–present)	Calgary, AB	Notre Dame (AB)	Calgary, Ole Miss
Giovanni Manu	Offensive lineman	Detroit Lions (2024–present)	Nuku'alofa, Tonga	Pitt Meadows (BC)	UBC
John Metchie	Wide receiver	Houston Texans (2022–2025) Philadelphia Eagles (2025) New York Jets (2025–present)	Taiwan	St. James (MD) Peddie (NJ)	Alabama
Amen Ogbongbemiga	Linebacker	Los Angeles Chargers (2021–2023); Chicago Bears (2024–present)	Lagos, Nigeria	Notre Dame (AB)	OK State
Josh Palmer	Wide receiver	Los Angeles Chargers (2021–2025); Buffalo Bills (2025–present)	Brampton, ON	St. Thomas Aquinas (FL)	Tennessee
Tavius Robinson	Linebacker	Baltimore Ravens (2023–present)	Guelph, ON	Guelph CVI (ON)	Guelph Ole Miss
Nathan Shepherd	Defensive tackle	New York Jets (2018–2022); New Orleans Saints (2023–present)	Ajax, ON	J Clarke Richardson (ON)	Simon Fraser Fort Hays State
Dakoda Shepley	Offensive tackle	San Francisco 49ers (2020–2021); Seattle Seahawks (2021); Dallas Cowboys (2022–present)	Windsor, ON	Holy Names (ON)	UBC
Sidy Sow	Guard	New England Patriots (2023–present)	Granby, QC	Champlain (PQ)	Eastern Michigan
Benjamin St-Juste	Cornerback	Washington Commanders (2021–2024); Los Angeles Chargers (2025–present)	Montreal, QC	Cegep Vieux Montreal (PQ)	Michigan Minnesota
Jared Wayne	Wide receiver	Houston Texans (2023–present)	Peterborough, ON	Clearwater Academy (FL)	Pittsburgh

== All time ==
This is a list of Canadians who have played at least one regular season game in the National Football League.

Player	Debut season	Final season	Birthplace
Vince Abbott	1987	1988	London, England
Mehdi Abdesmad	2016	2016	Montreal, Quebec
Isaiah Adams	2024	Present	Ajax, Ontario
Zenon Andrusyshyn	1978	1978	Günzburg, Germany
Eli Ankou	2017	Present	Ottawa, Ontario
Oshiomogho Atogwe	2005	2011	Windsor, Ontario
Antony Auclair	2017	2020	Notre-Dame-des-Pins, Quebec
Elic Ayomanor	2025	Present	Medicine Hat, Alberta
Wesley Bailey	2026	Present	Ottawa, Ontario
Ian Beckles	1990	1998	Montreal, Quebec
Brian Belway	1987	1987	Ottawa, Ontario
Theo Benedet	2025	Present	Toronto, Ontario
Mitch Berger	1994	2009	Kamloops, British Columbia
Matthew Bergeron	2023	Present	Victoriaville, Quebec
Tim Biakabutuka	1996	2001	Kinshasa, Congo
Christo Bilukidi	2012	2014	Angola
Brett Boyko	2017	2017	Saskatoon, Saskatchewan
Chase Brown	2023	Present	London, Ontario
Doug Brown	1998	1999	New Westminster, British Columbia
Sydney Brown	2023	Present	London, Ontario
Nate Burleson	2003	2013	Calgary, Alberta
Tevaughn Campbell	2019	Present	Scarborough, Ontario
Kerry Carter	2003	2004	Port of Spain, Trinidad and Tobago
Gene Ceppetelli	1968	1969	Sudbury, Ontario
Gordy Ceresino	1979	1979	Thunder Bay, Ontario
Stefan Charles	2013	2016	Oshawa, Ontario
Randy Chevrier	2001	2001	St. Leonard, Quebec
Steve Christie	1990	2004	Oakville, Ontario
Ken Clark	1979	1979	Southampton, England
Chase Claypool	2020	Present	Abbotsford, British Columbia
Colin Cole	2004	2015	Toronto, Ontario
Austin Collie	2009	2013	Hamilton, Ontario
Christian Covington	2015	2020	Vancouver, British Columbia
Bill Crawford	1960	1960	New Westminster, British Columbia
Tyrone Crawford	2012	2020	Windsor, Ontario
Justin Cross	1982	1986	Montreal, Quebec
Hec Cyre	1926	1928	Riviere Qui Barre, Alberta
J. P. Darche	2000	2008	Montreal, Quebec
Jason David	2004	2008	Edmonton, Alberta
Clifton Dawson	2007	2008	Scarborough, Ontario
Dahrran Diedrick	2004	2004	St. Anne's, Jamaica
Dean Dorsey	1988	1988	Toronto, Ontario
Paul Duhart	1944	1945	Montreal, Quebec
Laurent Duvernay-Tardif	2014	2021	Mont-Saint-Hilaire, Quebec
Hicham El-Mashtoub	1995	1996	Lebanon
Mohammed Elewonibi	1992	1995	Lagos, Nigeria
Daniel Federkeil	2006	2009	Medicine Hat, Alberta
Brian Forde	1988	1991	Montreal, Quebec
David Foucault	2014	2014	La Salle, Quebec
Orlando Franklin	2011	2017	Kingston, Jamaica
Brian Fryer	1976	1976	Edmonton, Alberta
Neville Gallimore	2020	Present	Ottawa, Ontario
Roy Gerela	1969	1979	Sarrail, Alberta
Sam Giguere	2009	2009	Sherbrooke, Quebec
Rick Goltz	1987	1987	Vancouver, British Columbia
Andrew Greene	1995	1998	Kingston, Jamaica
Cory Greenwood	2010	2012	Kingston, Ontario
Hal Griggs	1926	1926	Toronto, Ontario
Cecil Hare	1941	1946	Glenbush, Saskatchewan
Ray Hare	1940	1946	North Battleford, Saskatchewan
N'Keal Harry	2019	Present	Toronto, Ontario
Harald Hasselbach	1994	2000	Amsterdam, Netherlands
Kyle Hergel	2024	Present	Toronto, Ontario
Bill Hitchcock	1991	1994	Kirkland, Quebec
Michael Hoecht	2020	Present	Oakville, Ontario
Jevon Holland	2021	Present	Coquitlam, British Columbia
Bill Howell	1929	1929	Bath, Ontario
Chuba Hubbard	2021	Present	Edmonton, Alberta
Tommy Hughitt	1920	1924	Genoa, British Columbia
Ryan Hunter	2019	2019	North Bay, Ontario
Israel Idonije	2004	2013	Lagos, Nigeria
Hank Ilesic	1989	1989	Edmonton, Alberta
Alaric Jackson	2021	Present	Windsor, Ontario
Riall Johnson	2001	2003	White Rock, British Columbia
Teyo Johnson	2003	2005	White Rock, British Columbia
Theo Johnson	2024	Present	Winnipeg, Manitoba
Brett Jones	2016	2020	Weyburn, Saskatchewan
T. J. Jones	2015	2019	Winnipeg, Manitoba
Nick Kaczur	2005	2009	Brantford, Ontario
Nikola Kalinic	2022	2022	Toronto, Ontario
Tommy Kane	1988	1992	Montreal, Quebec
Alain Kashama	2004	2005	Democratic Republic of Congo
Jerry Kauric	1990	1990	Windsor, Ontario
Allan Kennedy	1981	1984	Vancouver, British Columbia
Markus Koch	1986	1991	Niedermarsberg, Germany
Mike Kostiuk	1941	1945	Krydor, Saskatchewan
Joe Krol	1945	1945	Hamilton, Ontario
Art Kuehn	1976	1983	Victoria, British Columbia
Mike Labinjo	2004	2005	Toronto, Ontario
L. P. Ladouceur	2005	2020	Montreal, Quebec
Les Lear	1944	1947	Grafton, North Dakota, United States
Deane Leonard	2022	Present	Calgary, Alberta
Jesse Luketa	2022	Present	Edmonton, Alberta
Buck MacDonald	1920	1921	Pictou, Nova Scotia
Corey Mace	2008	2009	Port Moody, British Columbia
Tony Mandarich	1989	1998	Oakville, Ontario
Vaughn Martin	2009	2013	Jamaica
Rueben Mayes	1986	1993	North Battleford, Saskatchewan
Tanner McLachlan	2024	Present	Lethbridge, Alberta
Russ McLeod	1934	1934	Cypress River, Manitoba
Rob Meier	2000	2008	Vancouver, British Columbia
John Metchie	2022	Present	Taiwan
Jim Mills	1983	1984	Vancouver, British Columbia
Mark Montreuil	1995	1997	Montreal, Quebec
Steve Morley	2005	2005	Halifax, Nova Scotia
Henoc Muamba	2014	2014	Kinshasa, Congo
Andy Mulumba	2013	2015	Luputa, Congo
Eddie Murray	1980	2000	Halifax, Nova Scotia
Bronko Nagurski	1930	1943	Rainy River, Ontario
Earl Nolan	1937	1938	Vancouver, British Columbia
Carter O'Donnell	2023	Present	Calgary, Alberta
Charlie O'Rourke	1942	1949	Montreal, Quebec
Jesse Palmer	2002	2003	Toronto, Ontario
Josh Palmer	2021	Present	Toronto, Ontario
Austin Pasztor	2012	2018	Langton, Ontario
Jerome Pathon	1998	2005	Cape Town, South Africa
Russ Peterson	1932	1932	Midale, Saskatchewan
Gary Pettigrew	1966	1974	Vancouver, British Columbia
Ed Philion	1994	1995	Windsor, Ontario
Harry Robertson	1922	1922	Chambly, Quebec
Tavius Robinson	2023	Present	Guelph, Ontario
Brett Romberg	2006	2011	Windsor, Ontario
Bill Rooney	1923	1929	Hull, Quebec
Joe Rooney	1923	1928	Saskatoon, Saskatchewan
Ed Ryan	1948	1948	Banff, Alberta
Jon Ryan	2006	2017	Regina, Saskatchewan
Mark Rypien	1988	2001	Calgary, Alberta
Davis Sanchez	2001	2002	Vancouver, British Columbia
O.J. Santiago	1997	2003	Whitby, Ontario
Mike Schad	1987	1993	Trenton, Ontario
Chris Schultz	1983	1985	Hamilton, Ontario
Nathan Shepherd	2018	Present	Ajax, Ontario
Dakoda Shepley	2020	Present	Windsor, Ontario
Frank Skinner	1922	1922	Montreal, Quebec
Tevaun Smith	2016	2016	Toronto, Ontario
Sidy Sow	2023	Present	Granby, Quebec
Dave Sparenberg	1987	1987	Talbotville, Ontario
Jeff Spek	1986	1986	Calgary, Alberta
Benjamin St-Juste	2021	Present	Montreal, Quebec
Wayne Stewart	1969	1974	Cochrane, Alberta
Frank Stojack	1935	1936	Wycliffe, British Columbia
Cecil Sturgeon	1941	1941	Carnduff, Saskatchewan
Lyle Sturgeon	1937	1937	Carnduff, Saskatchewan
Shaun Suisham	2005	2014	Wallaceburg, Ontario
Ian Sunter	1976	1980	Dundee, Scotland
Ryan Thelwell	1998	1998	Montego Bay, Jamaica
Tim Tindale	1995	1997	London, Ontario
Brent Urban	2014	Present	Mississauga, Ontario
John Urschel	2014	2016	Winnipeg, Manitoba
Mike Vanderjagt	1998	2006	Oakville, Ontario
Fred Vant Hull	1942	1942	Winnipeg, Manitoba
Tyler Varga	2015	2015	Stockholm, Sweden
Luiji Vilain	2022	Present	Ottawa, Ontario
Danny Watkins	2011	2013	Kelowna, British Columbia
Joe Watt	1947	1949	Montreal, Quebec
Arnie Weinmeister	1948	1953	Rhein, Saskatchewan
Jamaal Westerman	2009	2013	Brooklyn, New York, United States
Lloyd Wickett	1943	1946	Ontario
Ted Williams	1942	1944	Bay Bulls, Newfoundland and Labrador
Tyrone Williams	1993	1993	Halifax, Nova Scotia
Luke Willson	2013	2020	Windsor, Ontario
Klaus Wilmsmeyer	1992	1998	Mississauga, Ontario
Perce Wilson	1920	1920	Lifford, Ontario
Phil Yeboah-Kodie	1996	1996	Ghana
Glen Young	1995	1996	Scarborough, Ontario
Jim Young	1965	1966	Hamilton, Ontario

== See also ==
- List of Canadian NASCAR drivers
- List of Canadians in the National Basketball Association
- List of Major League Baseball players from Canada
