= 2024 BC Lions season =

CFL team season

- General manager: Rick Campbell; Neil McEvoy
- President: Duane Vienneau
- Head coach: Rick Campbell
- Home stadium: BC Place Stadium

Results
- Record: 9–9
- Division place: 3rd, West
- Playoffs: Lost West Semi-Final
- Team MOP: Justin McInnis
- Team MODP: Garry Peters
- Team MOC: Justin McInnis
- Team MOOL: Jarell Broxton
- Team MOST: Sean Whyte
- Team MOR: Ayinde Eley

Uniform
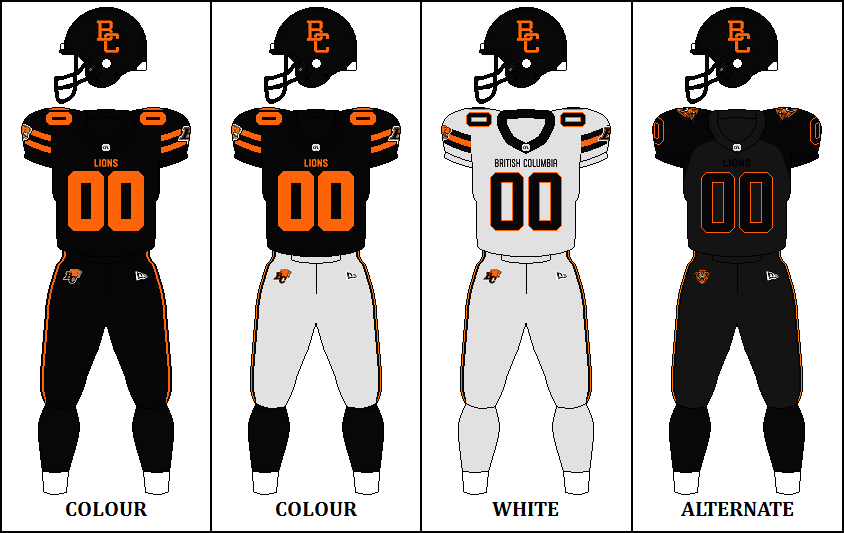

The 2024 BC Lions season was the 66th season for the team in the Canadian Football League (CFL) and their 70th overall. The Lions qualified for the playoffs for the third straight year in week 18 following their win over the Calgary Stampeders and Saskatchewan's the next day. However, the team lost the West Semi-Final to the Roughriders.

The 2024 CFL season was the fourth season with Rick Campbell as the team's head coach and the third season with Campbell and Neil McEvoy as co-general managers.

The BC Lions drew an average home attendance of 26,883 in 2024.

== Offseason ==
=== CFL global draft ===
The 2024 CFL global draft took place on April 30, 2024. The Lions had two picks in the draft, selecting sixth in each round.

Round	Pick	Player	Position	Club/School	Nationality
1	6	Carl Meyer	K	Jacksonville Sharks	South Africa
2	15	Tory Taylor	P	Iowa	Australia

== CFL national draft ==
The 2024 CFL draft took place on April 30, 2024. The Lions had nine selections in the eight-round draft. Not including traded picks, the team selected sixth in each round of the draft after finishing second in the 2023 league standings of teams that did not qualify for the 110th Grey Cup game.

Round	Pick	Player	Position	School	Hometown
1	6	George Una	OL	Windsor	Toronto, ON
2	15	Theo Benedet	OL	British Columbia	North Vancouver, BC
2	19	Ezechiel Tieide	WR	Concordia	Lachine, QC
3	26	Cristophe Beaulieu	DB	Laval	Blainville, QC
5	44	Kail Dava	DL	Tennessee Tech	Mississauga, ON
6	53	Terrence Ganyi	LB	Maine	Montreal, QC
7	62	Dawson Marchant	DB	Northwestern Oklahoma State	Vancouver, BC
8	71	Theo Johnson	TE	Pennsylvania State	Windsor, ON

== Preseason ==
=== Schedule ===
Week	Game	Date	Kickoff	Opponent	Results		TV	Venue	Attendance	Summary
Week	Game	Date	Kickoff	Opponent	Score	Record	TV	Venue	Attendance	Summary
A	Bye									
B	1	Sat, May 25	1:00 p.m. PDT	at Calgary Stampeders	L 6–30	0–1	CFL+	McMahon Stadium	17,060	Recap
C	2	Fri, May 31	7:00 p.m. PDT	vs. Edmonton Elks	W 26–9	1–1	TSN	BC Place	N/A	Recap

# Games played with blackout uniforms.
# Games played with fog uniforms.

== Regular season ==
=== Standings ===
West Division
Team	GP	W	L	T	Pts	PF	PA	Div	Stk	
Winnipeg Blue Bombers	18	11	7	0	22	447	365	7–3	W1	Details
Saskatchewan Roughriders	18	9	8	1	19	478	434	5–5	L1	Details
BC Lions	18	9	9	0	18	448	439	5–5	W1	Details
Edmonton Elks	18	7	11	0	14	494	500	5–5	W2	Details
Calgary Stampeders	18	5	12	1	11	427	510	3–7	W1	Details

=== Schedule ===
On November 29, 2023, the Lions announced that they would be the host team for a neutral site game that was played at Royal Athletic Park in Victoria on August 31, 2024, against the Ottawa Redblacks.

Week	Game	Date	Kickoff	Opponent	Results		TV	Venue	Attendance	Summary
Week	Game	Date	Kickoff	Opponent	Score	Record	TV	Venue	Attendance	Summary
1	1	Sun, June 9	4:00 p.m. PDT	at Toronto Argonauts	L 27–35	0–1	TSN/CBSSN	BMO Field	12,767	Recap
2	2	Sat, June 15	4:00 p.m. PDT	vs. Calgary Stampeders	W 26–17	1–1	TSN/RDS2/CBSSN	BC Place	53,788	Recap
3	3	Fri, June 21	5:30 p.m. PDT	at Winnipeg Blue Bombers	W 26–24	2–1	TSN/RDS	Princess Auto Stadium	31,210	Recap
4	4	Thu, June 27	7:00 p.m. PDT	vs. Edmonton Elks	W 24–21	3–1	TSN	BC Place	19,016	Recap
5	5	Sun, July 7	4:00 p.m. PDT	at Hamilton Tiger-Cats	W 44–28	4–1	TSN/CBSSN	Tim Hortons Field	20,210	Recap
6	6	Sat, July 13	4:00 p.m. PDT	vs. Saskatchewan Roughriders	W 35–20	5–1	TSN/CBSSN	BC Place	30,803	Recap
7	7	Sun, July 21	4:00 p.m. PDT	at Calgary Stampeders	L 24–25	5–2	TSN/CBSSN	McMahon Stadium	20,057	Recap
8	Bye									
9	8	Thu, Aug 1	5:30 p.m. PDT	at Winnipeg Blue Bombers	L 0–25	5–3	TSN/RDS	Princess Auto Stadium	31,859	Recap
10	9	Sun, Aug 11	4:00 p.m. PDT	at Edmonton Elks	L 16–33	5–4	TSN/CBSSN	Commonwealth Stadium	18,447	Recap
11	10	Sun, Aug 18	4:00 p.m. PDT	vs. Winnipeg Blue Bombers	L 11–20	5–5	TSN/RDS2/CBSSN	BC Place	30,803	Recap
12	11	Sat, Aug 24	4:00 p.m. PDT	at Ottawa Redblacks	L 27–34	5–6	TSN/RDS2	TD Place Stadium	19,761	Recap
13	12	Sat, Aug 31	4:00 p.m. PDT	Ottawa Redblacks	W 38–12	6–6	TSN/RDS2	Royal Athletic Park	14,727	Recap
14	13	Fri, Sept 6	4:30 p.m. PDT	at Montreal Alouettes	W 37–23	7–6	TSN/RDS/CBSSN	Molson Stadium	23,035	Recap
15	14	Fri, Sept 13	7:00 p.m. PDT	vs. Toronto Argonauts	L 17–33	7–7	TSN/CBSSN	BC Place	20,683	Recap
16	Bye									
17	15	Fri, Sept 27	7:30 p.m. PDT	vs. Hamilton Tiger-Cats	L 29–32 (2OT)	7–8	TSN	BC Place	22,583	Recap
18	16	Fri, Oct 4	7:00 p.m. PDT	vs. Calgary Stampeders	W 32–15	8–8	TSN	BC Place	21,108	Recap
19	17	Sat, Oct 12	4:00 p.m. PDT	at Saskatchewan Roughriders	L 8–39	8–9	TSN	Mosaic Stadium	28,683	Recap
20	18	Sat, Oct 19	4:00 p.m. PDT	vs. Montreal Alouettes	W 27–3	9–9	TSN/RDS	BC Place	28,436	Recap
21	Bye									

# Games played with blackout uniforms.
# Games played with fog uniforms.
# Games played with gunmetal uniforms.

== Post-season ==
=== Schedule ===
Game	Date	Kickoff	Opponent	Results		TV	Venue	Attendance	Summary
Game	Date	Kickoff	Opponent	Score	Record	TV	Venue	Attendance	Summary
West Semi-Final	Sat, Nov 2	3:30 p.m. PST	at Saskatchewan Roughriders	L 19–28	0–1	TSN/RDS	Mosaic Stadium	26,125	Recap

# Games played with fog uniforms.

== Roster ==
2024 BC Lions final roster
**Quarterbacks**: 3 Vernon Adams; 7 Chase Brice; 12 Nathan Rourke; **Running backs**: 25 Jeshrun Antwi; 34 David Mackie; 45 Riley Pickett; 31 William Stanback; **Receivers**: 83 Stanley Berryhill; 86 Jevon Cottoy; 19 Ayden Eberhardt; 4 Keon Hatcher; 13 Alexander Hollins; 18 Justin McInnis; 87 Terry Williams	**Offensive linemen**: 69 Jarell Broxton T; 65 Sukh Chungh G; 51 Michael Couture C; 54 Andrew Peirson C/G; 59 Kent Perkins T; 64 Kory Woodruff G; **Defensive linemen**: 94 Joshua Archibald DE; 92 Josh Banks DT; 90 Mathieu Betts DE; 56 Christian Covington DT; 49 Tibo Debaillie DT; 40 Pete Robertson DE; 99 Jonah Tavai DT; 0 Sione Teuhema DE	**Linebackers**: 41 Ace Eley; 43 Terrence Ganyi; 44 Isaiah Guzylak-Messam; 46 Ben Hladik; 32 Maxime Rouyer; 48 Ryder Varga; **Defensive backs**: 29 Cristophe Beaulieu; 8 Jalon Edwards-Cooper; 23 Adrian Greene; 21 Ronald Kent; 6 T. J. Lee; 1 Garry Peters; 24 Patrice Rene; 33 Emmanuel Rugamba	**Special teams**: 11 Stefan Flintoft P/K; 48 Kyle Nelson LS; 10 Sean Whyte K; **Practice roster**: 88 Jared Bernhardt WR; 36 Tyler Coyle DB; 79 Juliano Falaniko DE; 71 Carl Meyer P/K; 27 Jordan Perryman DB; 74 Kieran Poissant SB; 26 Charlie Ringland DB; 42 Mike Smith LB; 28 Jordan Terrell RB; 80 Ezechiel Tieide SB; 35 Amechi Uzodinma DB	**Injured list**: 98 Francis Bemiy DT; 91 Nathan Cherry DT; 17 Ciante Evans DB; 66 David Knevel G/T; 20 Bo Lokombo LB; 95 Marcus Moore DT; 62 Tyler Packer G; 57 Chris Schleuger G/T; 61 George Una G; 2 Josh Woods LB; **Suspended**: 27 Damarea Crockett RB; 19 Jake Harty WR
Italics indicate American player • **Bold** indicates Global player

== Coaching staff ==
BC Lions staff
Front Office and Support Staff: Owner – Amar Doman; President and CEO – Rick LeLacheur; Vice President, Business – George Chayka; Chief Operating Officer – Duane Vienneau; General Manager – Neil McEvoy; Director of Football Operations – Neil McEvoy; Assistant General Manager and Director of Player Personnel – Ryan Rigmaiden; Director of Canadian Scouting & CFL Draft Coordinator – Rob Ralph; Video Coordinator – Derek Oswalt; Head Athletic Therapist – Tristan Sandhu; Equipment Manager – Aaron Yeung	Head Coaches: Head Coach/Co-General Manager – Rick Campbell; Assistant Head Coach/Defensive Coordinator – Ryan Phillips; Offensive Coaches: Offensive Coordinator – Jordan Maksymic; Receivers – Jason Tucker; Offensive Line – Kelly Bates; Running Backs – Trysten Dyce; Defensive Coaches: Defensive Line – John Bowman; Linebackers – Travis Brown; Assistant Defensive Backs – Tanya Henderson; Special Teams Coaches: Special Teams Coordinator – Mike Benevides; Special Teams Assistant – Derek Oswalt; → Coaching staff
