= List of Canadians in the NBA =

This is a list of basketball players from Canada who have played in the National Basketball Association (NBA).

== Active players ==
- Nickeil Alexander-Walker
  - New Orleans Pelicans (2019–2022)
  - Utah Jazz (2022–2023)
  - Minnesota Timberwolves (2023–2025)
  - Atlanta Hawks (2025–present)
- RJ Barrett
  - New York Knicks (2019–2023)
  - Toronto Raptors (2023–present)
- Dillon Brooks
  - Memphis Grizzlies (2017–2023)
  - Houston Rockets (2023–2025)
  - Phoenix Suns (2025–present)
- Luguentz Dort
  - Oklahoma City Thunder (2019–2026)
  - Atlanta Hawks (2026–present)
- Zach Edey
  - Memphis Grizzlies (2024–present)
- Kyshawn George
  - Washington Wizards (2024–present)
- Shai Gilgeous-Alexander
  - Los Angeles Clippers (2018–2019)
  - Oklahoma City Thunder (2019–present)
- Trey Lyles
  - Utah Jazz (2015–2017)
  - Denver Nuggets (2017–2019)
  - San Antonio Spurs (2019–2021)
  - Detroit Pistons (2021–2022)
  - Sacramento Kings (2022–2025)
  - Minnesota Timberwolves (2026–present)
- Bennedict Mathurin
  - Indiana Pacers (2022–2026)
  - Los Angeles Clippers (2026)
  - New Orleans Pelicans (2026–present)
- Leonard Miller
  - Minnesota Timberwolves (2023–2026)
  - Chicago Bulls (2026–present)
- Jamal Murray
  - Denver Nuggets (2016–present)
- Andrew Nembhard
  - Indiana Pacers (2022–present)
- Ryan Nembhard
  - Dallas Mavericks (2025–2026)
  - Denver Nuggets (2026–present)
- Olivier-Maxence Prosper
  - Dallas Mavericks (2023–2025)
  - Memphis Grizzlies (2025–present)
- Will Riley
  - Washington Wizards (2025–present)
- Emanuel Sharp
  - Sacramento Kings (2026-present)
- Shaedon Sharpe
  - Portland Trail Blazers (2022–present)
- Andrew Wiggins
  - Minnesota Timberwolves (2014–2020)
  - Golden State Warriors (2020–2025)
  - Miami Heat (2025–present)

== Awards and honors ==
Hall of Famers

- Bob Houbregs, 1987
- Steve Nash, 2018

Most Valuable Player

- Steve Nash, 2 times, 2005–2006
- Shai Gilgeous-Alexander, 2 times, 2025-2026

All-NBA Team

- Steve Nash, First Team 3 times (2005–2007), Second Team 2 times (2008, 2010), Third Team 2 times (2002–2003)
- Shai Gilgeous-Alexander, First Team 4 times, (2023–2026)
- Jamal Murray, Third Team 1 time, 2026

First overall draft pick

- Anthony Bennett (Cleveland Cavaliers, UNLV, 2013)
- Andrew Wiggins (Cleveland Cavaliers, Kansas, 2014)

Rookie of the Year Award

- Andrew Wiggins (Minnesota Timberwolves, 2015)

Defensive Player of the Year

None

Most Improved Player

- Nickeil Alexander-Walker (Atlanta Hawks, 2026)

Sixth Man of the Year

None

All-Rookie Team

- Rick Fox, Second Team, 1992
- Tristan Thompson, Second Team, 2012
- Kelly Olynyk, Second Team, 2014
- Andrew Wiggins, First Team, 2015
- Jamal Murray, Second Team, 2017
- Shai Gilgeous-Alexander, Second Team, 2019
- Brandon Clarke, First Team, 2020
- Bennedict Mathurin, First Team, 2023

NBA Champions

- Mike Smrek, 2 times, 1987–1988
- Bill Wennington, 3 times, 1996–1998
- Rick Fox, 3 times, 2000–2002
- Joel Anthony, 2 times, 2012–2013
- Cory Joseph, 1 time, 2014
- Tristan Thompson, 1 time, 2016
- Chris Boucher, 2 times, 2018–2019
- Andrew Wiggins, 1 time, 2022
- Jamal Murray, 1 time, 2023
- Oshae Brissett, 1 time, 2024
- Shai Gilgeous-Alexander, 1 time, 2025
- Luguentz Dort, 1 time, 2025

NBA Finals MVP

Shai Gilgeous-Alexander, 1 time, 2025

NBA Citizenship Award

- Steve Nash, 2007
- Samuel Dalembert, 2010

NBA Sportsmanship Award

None

Teammate of the Year

None

== All-Star selection ==
- Steve Nash, 8 times, 2002–2003, 2005–2008, 2010, 2012
- Shai Gilgeous-Alexander, 4 times, 2023-2026
- Jamaal Magloire, 2004
- Jamal Murray, 2026
- Andrew Wiggins, 2022

== Players ==
This is an alphabetical list of 72 basketball players from Canada who have played in the National Basketball Association since 1946. Players listed in bold are currently on NBA rosters.

== A ==
- Kyle Alexander
- **Nickeil Alexander-Walker**
- Joel Anthony

== B ==
- Norm Baker
- Dalano Banton
- **RJ Barrett**
- Anthony Bennett
- Sim Bhullar
- Hank Biasatti
- Khem Birch
- Chris Boucher
- Ignas Brazdeikis
- Oshae Brissett
- **Dillon Brooks**

== C ==
- Brandon Clarke
- Ron Crevier

== D ==
- Samuel Dalembert
- Nate Darling
- **Luguentz Dort**

== E ==
- **Zach Edey**
- Tyler Ennis

== F ==
- Rick Fox

== G ==
- **Kyshawn George**
- **Shai Gilgeous-Alexander**
- Stewart Granger

== H ==
- Lars Hansen
- Bob Houbregs
- Caleb Houstan

== J ==
- Cory Joseph
- Kris Joseph

== K ==
- Mfiondu Kabengele

== L ==
- A. J. Lawson
- **Trey Lyles**

== M ==
- Todd MacCulloch
- Jamaal Magloire
- Karim Mané
- **Bennedict Mathurin**
- Emanuel Miller
- **Leonard Miller**
- Naz Mitrou-Long
- Mychal Mulder
- **Jamal Murray**

== N ==
- Steve Nash
- **Andrew Nembhard**
- **Ryan Nembhard**
- Andrew Nicholson

== O ==
- Kelly Olynyk
- Eugene Omoruyi

== P ==
- Kevin Pangos
- Dwight Powell
- Joshua Primo
- **Olivier-Maxence Prosper**

== R ==
- Xavier Rathan-Mayes
- Andy Rautins
- Leo Rautins
- **Will Riley**
- Jackson Rowe

== S ==
- Robert Sacre
- **Emanuel Sharp**
- **Shaedon Sharpe**
- Marial Shayok
- Mike Smrek
- Gino Sovran
- Nik Stauskas

== T ==
- Jahmyl Telfort
- Tristan Thompson

== V ==
- Ernie Vandeweghe

== W ==
- Bill Wennington
- **Andrew Wiggins**
- Lindell Wigginton
- Kyle Wiltjer

== Z ==
- Jim Zoet

== See also ==
- List of foreign NBA players
- List of Canadian NASCAR drivers
- List of Canadians in the National Football League
- List of Major League Baseball players from Canada
