= Kyle Saxelid =

American gridiron football player (born 1995)

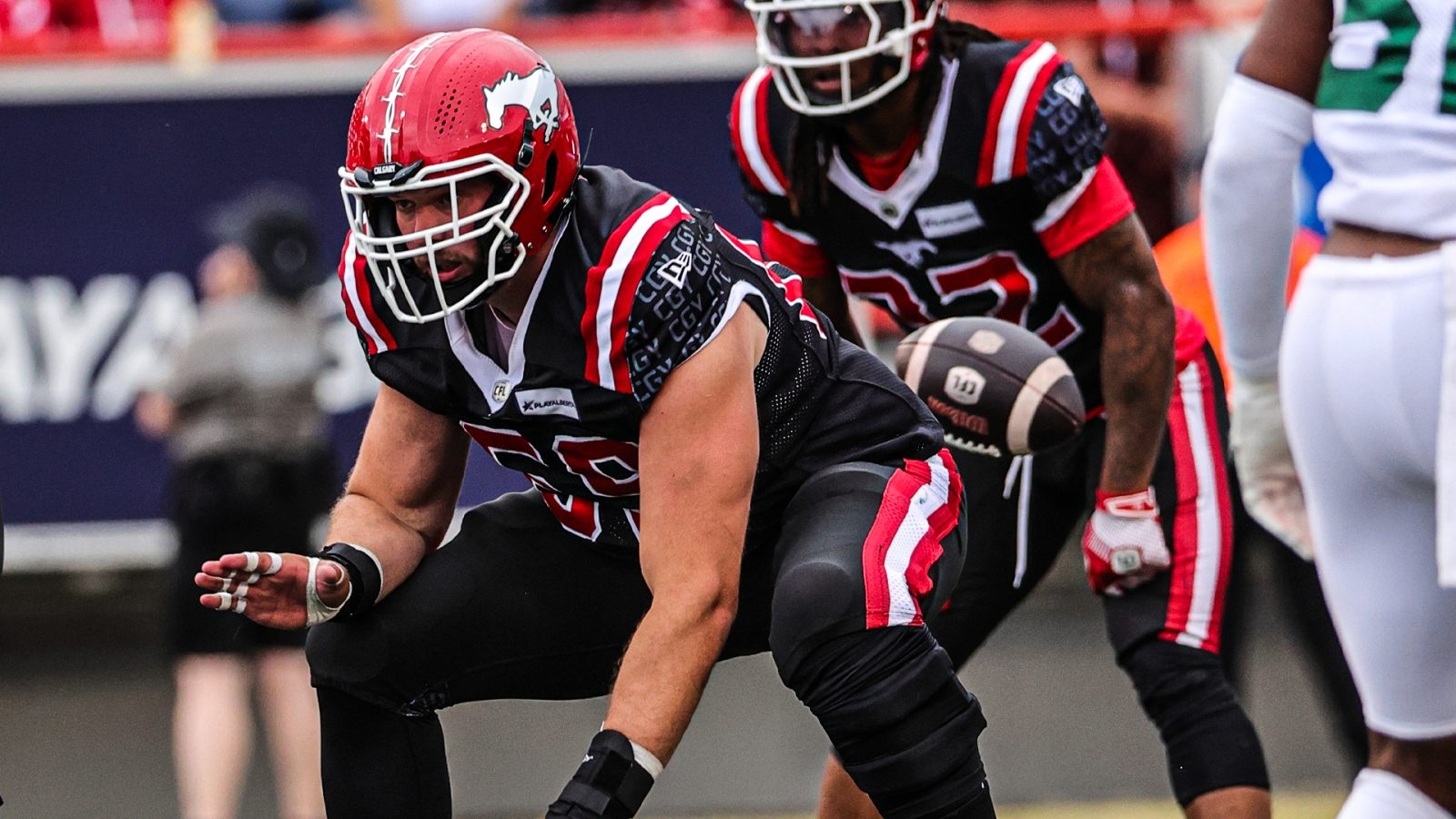
- Saxelid with the Calgary Stampeders in 2025

No. 69
- Position: Offensive lineman

Personal information
- Born: April 13, 1995 (age 31); Elk Grove, California, U.S.
- Listed height: 6 ft 8 in (2.03 m)
- Listed weight: 290 lb (132 kg)

Career information
- High school: Cosumnes Oaks High School
- College: UNLV
- CFL draft: 2019: 2nd round, 12th overall pick

Career history
- 2018: Nebraska Danger
- 2019: Cedar Rapids River Kings*
- 2019–2021: Edmonton Eskimos / Elks
- 2022–2023: Hamilton Tiger-Cats
- 2024–2025: Calgary Stampeders
- * Offseason or practice squad member only
- Stats at CFL.ca

Kyle Erickson Saxelid (born April 13, 1995) is a Canadian-American former professional football offensive lineman. He played for the Calgary Stampeders of the Canadian Football League (CFL). He is currently the offensive line coach and run game coordinator for the Nojima Sagamihara Rise semi-professional football team of the Japanese X-League.

== College career ==
Saxelid played for the University of Nevada Las Vegas, graduating in 2017 with a degree in Business. He played in 48 consecutive games for the Rebels, starting the last 42. He was named preseason Fourth Team All-MW by Athlon his Junior and Senior seasons. Saxelid earned three Academic All-Mountain West Conference honors and was nominated for a spot on the 2016 AFCA Good Works Team.

== Professional career ==
Pre-draft measurables
Height	Weight	40-yard dash	20-yard shuttle	Three-cone drill	Vertical jump	Broad jump	Bench press
6 ft 7 in (2.01 m)	299 lb (136 kg)	5.33 s	4.77 s	7.85 s	29.5 in (0.75 m)	9 ft 2 1/8 in (2.80 m)	20 reps
All values from CFL Combine

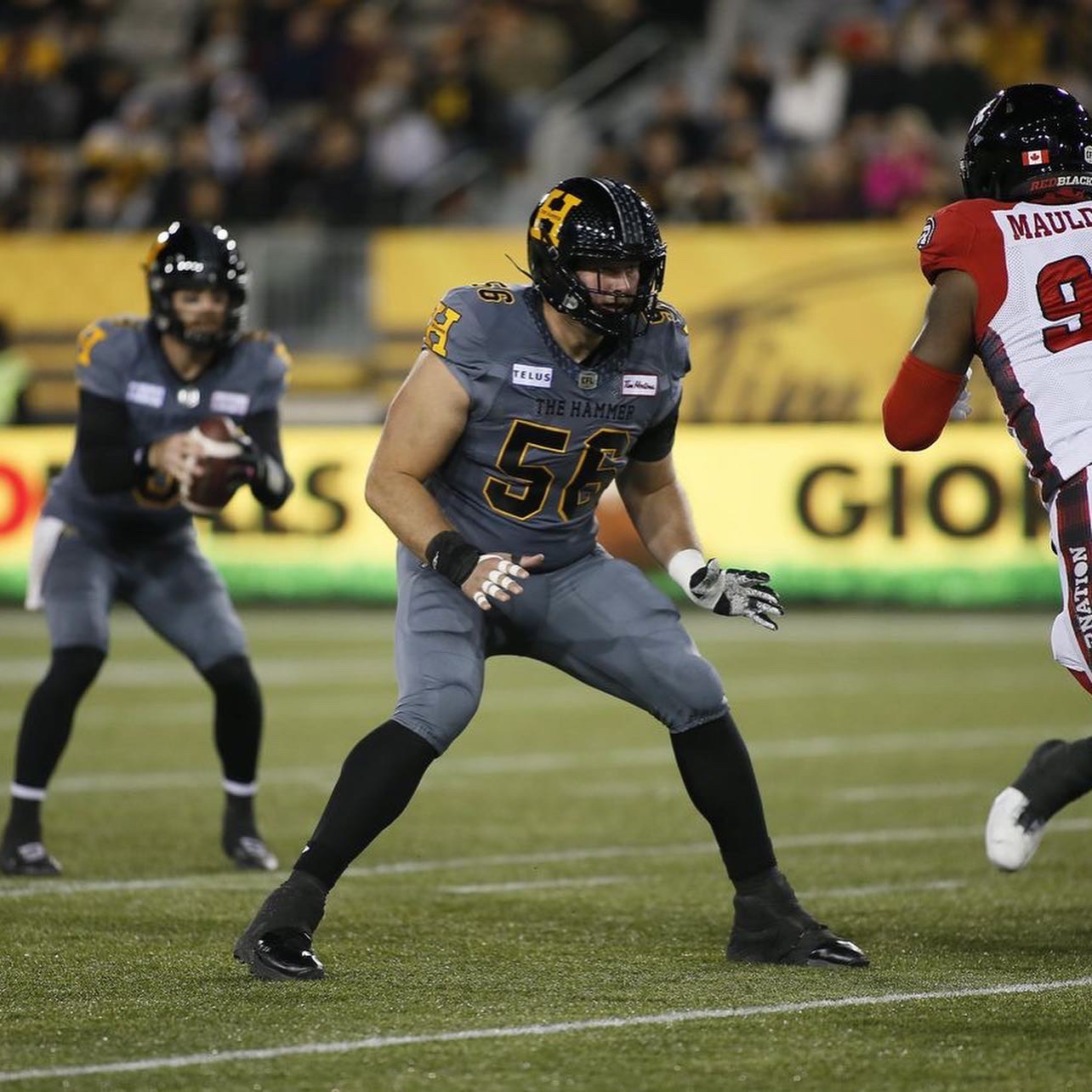
Saxelid with the Hamilton Tiger-Cats in 2023

=== Indoor Football League ===
Saxelid began his professional football career in 2018 playing for the Nebraska Danger of the Indoor Football League The following year, he signed with the Cedar Rapids River Kings of the same league, playing with fellow UNLV teammate Kurt Palandech.

=== Edmonton Eskimos / Elks ===
In May 2019, Saxelid was drafted in the second round (12th overall) of the 2019 CFL draft by the Edmonton Eskimos. He participated in all 18 games in his rookie season, starting a total of six games over the season (one at right guard, five at left tackle), including the Eastern Conference Final. He did not play in 2020 due to the cancellation of the 2020 CFL season. He played in 11 regular season games in 2021.

=== Hamilton Tiger-Cats ===
On May 2, 2022, Saxelid was traded to the Hamilton Tiger-Cats along with Grant McDonald and the second overall selection in the 2022 CFL global draft in exchange for the eighth and 28th overall selections in the 2022 CFL National Draft and the ninth overall selection in the 2022 CFL Global Draft. He was limited by injuries and played in just ten games over two seasons. He became a free agent upon the expiry of his contract on February 13, 2024.

=== Calgary Stampeders ===
On May 1, 2024, it was announced that Saxelid had signed with the Calgary Stampeders.

== Personal life ==
Saxelid is a Canadian citizen due to his mother being born in New Brunswick.
