= Marcus Moore (gridiron football) =

American football player (born 1997)

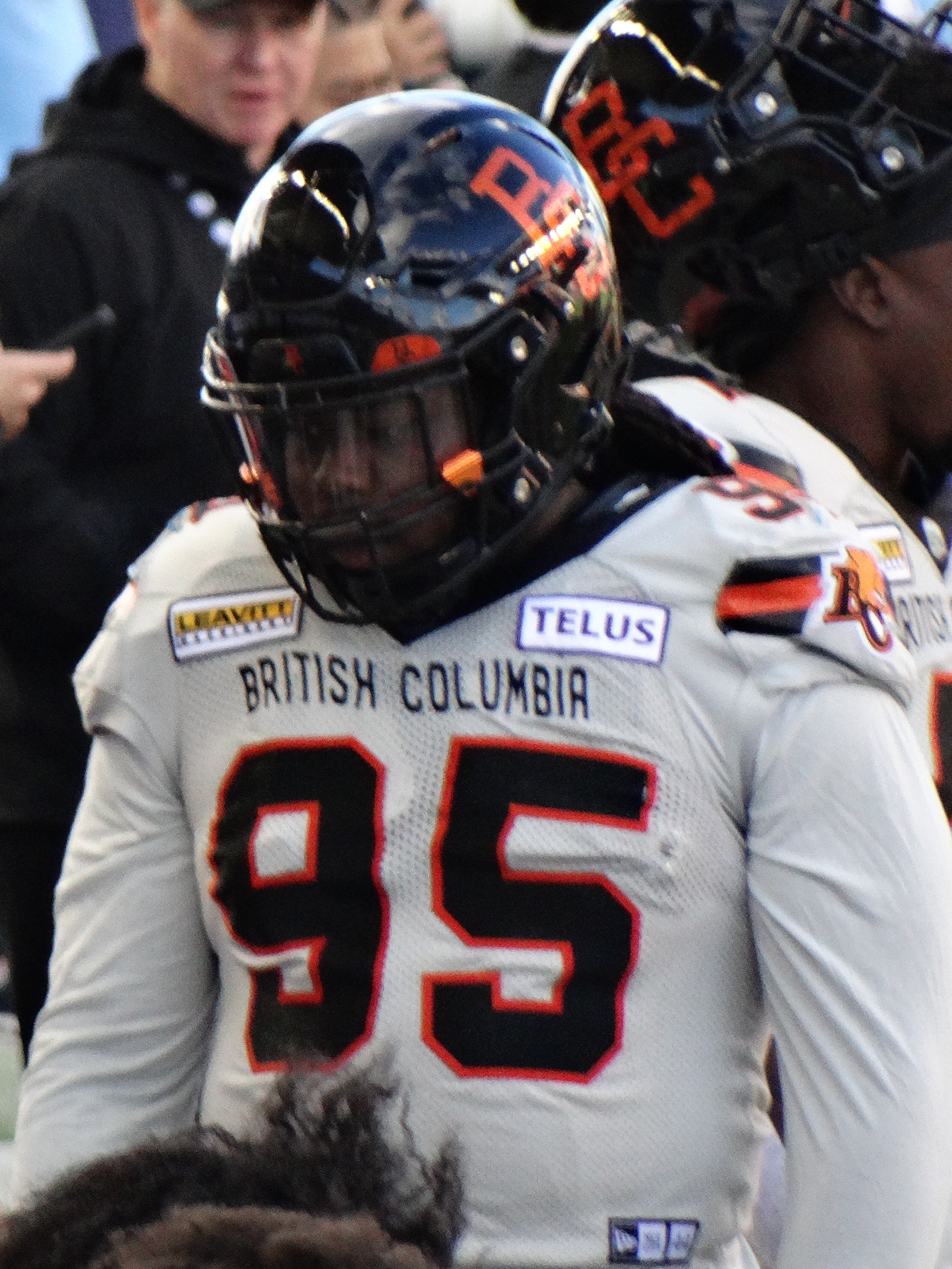
- Moore with the BC Lions in 2024

Profile
- Position: Defensive lineman

Personal information
- Born: September 7, 1997 (age 29); Pasadena, California, U.S.
- Listed height: 6 ft 2 in (1.88 m)
- Listed weight: 281 lb (127 kg)

Career information
- High school: Crespi Carmelite High
- College: California, Los Angeles; Utah State

Career history
- 2022–2026: BC Lions
- Stats at CFL.ca

Marcus Moore (born September 7, 1997) is an American professional football defensive lineman who is currently a free agent.

== College career ==
After using a redshirt season in 2016, Moore played college football for the UCLA Bruins from 2017 to 2018. He played in 17 games where he had 23 total tackles and one sack. He then transferred to Utah State University where he played for the Aggies beginning with the 2020 season. In 19 games with the Aggies, he had 65 total tackles and three sacks.

== Professional career ==
On September 15, 2022, Moore signed a practice roster agreement with the BC Lions. He did not play in 2022, but returned to the Lions in 2023. Following training camp, he began the year on the practice roster, but made his professional debut on August 3, 2023, against the Winnipeg Blue Bombers, where he had one defensive tackle and one interception. He played in the next game against the Calgary Stampeders, but soon after returned to the practice roster. He played in two regular season games in 2023, but played in the West Final where he recorded three defensive tackles in the loss to the Blue Bombers.

In 2024, Moore made the team's active roster following training camp and recorded his first sack in the season opener against the Toronto Argonauts.

On June 6, 2025, Moore was placed on the Lions' 1-game injured list to start the 2025 CFL season. He rejoined the active roster on June 26, 2025. On July 19, 2025, Moore was again placed on the Lions' 1-game injured list. He rejoined the active roster on September 4, 2025. On September 18, 2025, Moore was placed on the Lions' 1-game injured list for a third time, where he spent the remainder of the 2025 CFL season. He was released on April 2, 2026.

== Personal life ==
Moore was born to Christina Moore and has two brothers.
