= Patrice Rene =

Canadian gridiron football player (born 1997)

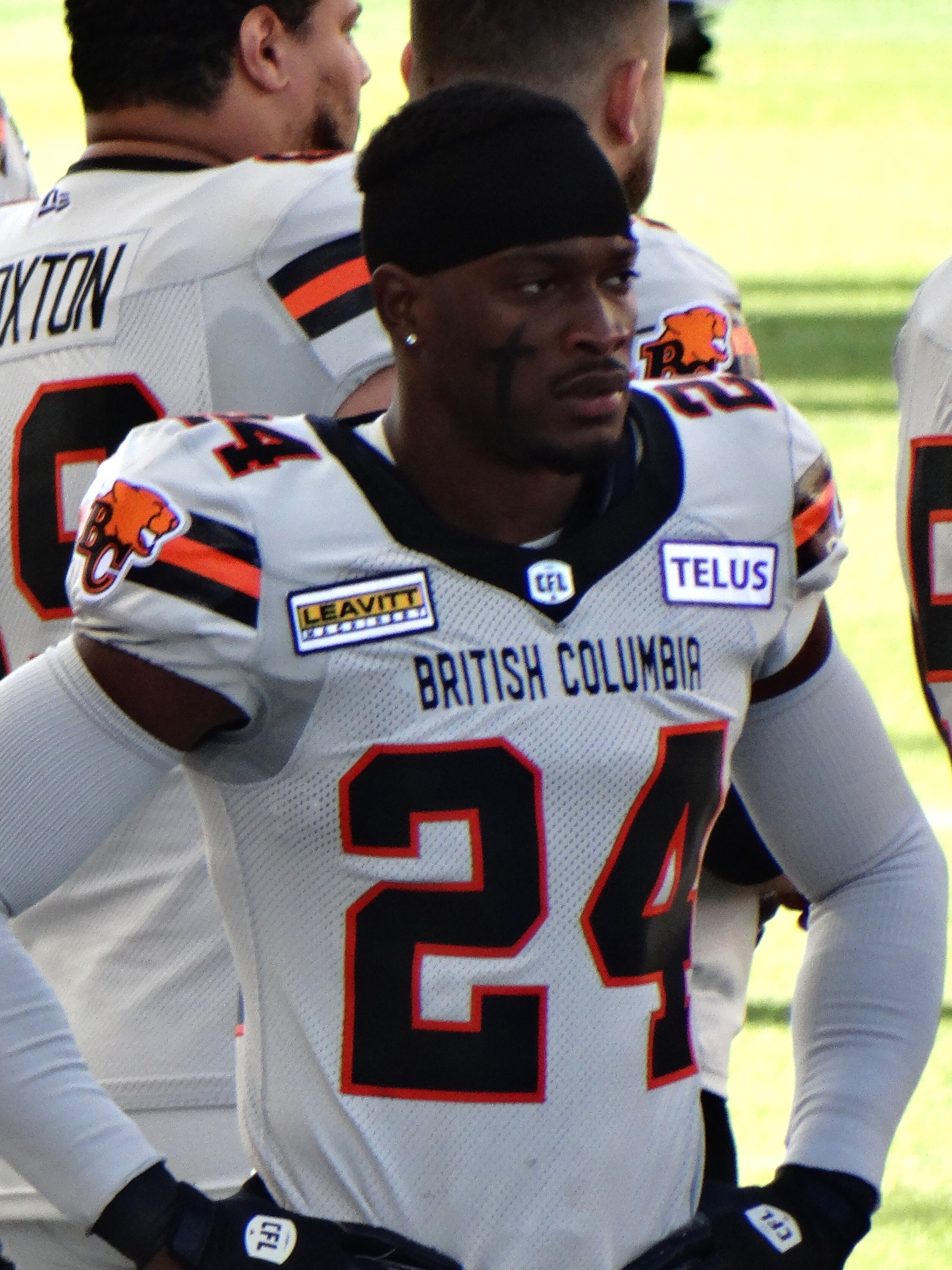
- Rene with the BC Lions in 2024

No. 24 – BC Lions
- Position: Defensive back
- Roster status: Active
- CFL status: National

Personal information
- Born: November 19, 1997 (age 28); Port-au-Prince, Haiti
- Listed height: 6 ft 2 in (1.88 m)
- Listed weight: 205 lb (93 kg)

Career information
- High school: Episcopal High
- College: Rutgers; North Carolina (2016–2020)
- CFL draft: 2021: 3rd round, 21st overall pick

Career history
- 2022: Winnipeg Blue Bombers
- 2023–present: BC Lions
- Stats at CFL.ca

Patrice Rene (born November 19, 1997) is a Haitian professional Canadian football defensive back for the BC Lions of the Canadian Football League (CFL).

== Early life ==
Rene was born in Port-au-Prince, Haiti, to parents Marie and Pierre and has three brothers and one sister. His family later moved to Ottawa, Ontario, where he grew up. Rene played his high school football at Episcopal High School in Alexandria, Virginia where he played for head coach Panos Voulgaris.

== College career ==
Rene originally committed to playing for the Rutgers Scarlet Knights in 2016, but changed to the University of North Carolina at Chapel Hill after Rutgers underwent a coaching change prior to his arrival. He played college football for the Tar Heels from 2016 to 2020, while using a redshirt season in 2019 due to an ACL injury. He played in 45 games, starting in 26, where he had 103 total tackles, two interceptions, and one forced fumble.

After finishing his degree, Rene transferred to Rutgers University, as he originally intended, to complete a master's degree. While playing for the Scarlet Knights, he dressed in five games and recorded eight tackles.

== Professional career ==
Pre-draft measurables
Height	Weight	Arm length	Hand span	Wingspan	40-yard dash	10-yard split	20-yard split	20-yard shuttle	Three-cone drill	Vertical jump	Broad jump	Bench press
6 ft 2 1/8 in (1.88 m)	202 lb (92 kg)	33 5/8 in (0.85 m)	9 1/8 in (0.23 m)	6 ft 6 5/8 in (2.00 m)	4.73 s	1.68 s	2.74 s	4.21 s	6.93 s	29.0 in (0.74 m)	10 ft 1 in (3.07 m)	10 reps
All values from Pro Day

=== Winnipeg Blue Bombers ===
Rene was drafted in the third round, 21st overall, by the Winnipeg Blue Bombers in the 2021 CFL draft. However, he completed his college eligibility that year and signed with the team for the following season on May 4, 2022. Following training camp in 2022, he began the season on the team's practice roster. He then made his professional debut in Week 12, on August 25, 2022, against the Calgary Stampeders, but was injured on a kickoff and was out for the remainder of the season. He was later released shortly after the end of the season on December 2, 2022.

=== BC Lions ===
On May 5, 2023, Rene signed with the BC Lions. He made the team's opening day active roster in 2023, primarily playing on special teams. He played in 16 regular season games where he recorded 12 special teams tackles. Rene earned a starting defensive role for BC in 2024, and recorded his first career sack on Edmonton Elks quarterback McLeod Bethel-Thompson on June 27, 2024. In 17 regular season games, Rene recorded 36 defensive tackles and 14 special teams tackles. On October 11, 2024, Rene was placed on the Lions' disabled list. He rejoined the active roster on October 11, 2024. On December 28, 2024, Rene signed a two-year contract extension with BC. On June 26, 2026, Rene was placed on the Lions' 1-game injured list. He rejoined the active roster on July 3, 2026. On July 16, 2026, Rene was again placed on the Lions' 1-game injured list. He rejoined the active roster on July 24, 2026. On July 30, 2026, Rene was, for a third time, placed on the Lions' 1-game injured list. He rejoined the active roster on August 7, 2026. On October 30, 2026, Rene was placed on the Lions' 1-game injured list ahead of the Western Semi-Final and he remained there to end the 2026 CFL season.
