= 2021 CFL draft =

Canadian football draft

General information
- Sport: Canadian football
- Date: May 4, 2021
- Time: 7:00 pm EDT
- Location: Toronto
- Network: TSN/RDS

Overview
- 54 total selections in 6 rounds
- League: CFL
- First selection: Jake Burt, TE, Hamilton Tiger-Cats
- Most selections (7): Hamilton Tiger-Cats; Toronto Argonauts
- Fewest selections (5): Montreal Alouettes; BC Lions
- U Sports selections: 31
- NCAA selections: 23

The 2021 CFL national draft was a selection of national players by Canadian Football League teams that took place at May 4, 2021 at 7:00 pm ET and was broadcast on TSN and RDS. 54 players were chosen from among eligible players from Canadian universities across the country, as well as Canadian players playing in the NCAA. Unlike previous drafts, where the selection order was determined by the previous year's standings, this year's draft order was determined by a random draw.

The draft was broadcast live on TSN for the first two rounds. Due to the COVID-19 pandemic, some commentators broadcast from remote locations as opposed to in-studio. The TSN production was hosted by Rod Smith and featured the CFL on TSN panel which included Farhan Lalji, Duane Forde, and Davis Sanchez. Randy Ambrosie, the CFL commissioner, was in the TSN studios in Toronto to announce the picks for the first two rounds.

== Format changes ==
Due to the cancellation of the 2020 CFL season as a result of the COVID-19 pandemic in Canada, the 2021 CFL draft underwent several changes. Since there was no previous season and standings, the draft order was a random draw with all nine teams having the same odds of being drawn. Every even-numbered round is in the reverse order of the odd-numbered rounds to balance the randomness of the draft order. The number of rounds in the draft decreased from eight to six due to the large number of rookies that will be present in camps (those from the 2020 CFL draft class). To accommodate that change, and due to U Sports and some NCAA programs not playing in 2020, eligible 2021 draftees were able to defer their draft years to 2022. Following the November 30, 2020 deadline, 132 U Sports players opted out of the 2021 Draft, which substantially reduced the available players this year. This led to speculation that NCAA redshirt juniors could be included in the draft to add more talent available this year which would also balance out the massive influx of players in 2022. This was confirmed when the league released the winter player rankings on January 20, 2021.

Further to those changes, there will be no territorial selections in 2021, after featuring them in the previous two drafts.

Unrelated to COVID-19 changes, beginning with this year's draft, any American or Global player that played football for a minimum of three years at a U Sports institution and graduated with a degree at that institution would qualify as a national player and be eligible for this year's draft.

== Top prospects ==
Source: CFL Scouting Bureau rankings.

Spring ranking	Winter ranking	Fall ranking	Player	Position	University	Hometown
1	2	4	Josh Palmer	Receiver	Tennessee	Brampton, ON
2	1	1	Alaric Jackson	Offensive lineman	Iowa	Windsor, ON
3	5	–	Jevon Holland	Defensive back	Oregon	Coquitlam, BC
4	4	2	Amen Ogbongbemiga	Linebacker	Oklahoma State	Calgary, AB
5	3	–	Chuba Hubbard	Running back	Oklahoma State	Sherwood Park, AB
6	11	–	Benjamin St-Juste	Defensive back	Minnesota	Montreal, QC
7	10	11	Pier-Olivier Lestage	Offensive lineman	Montreal	Saint-Eustache, QC
8	8	6	Sage Doxtater	Offensive lineman	New Mexico State	Welland, ON
9	15	–	Mohamed Diallo	Defensive lineman	Central Michigan	Toronto, ON
10	17	13	Deane Leonard	Defensive back	Mississippi	Calgary, AB
11	13	8	Patrice Rene	Defensive back	North Carolina	Ottawa, ON
12	7	5	Liam Dobson	Offensive lineman	Maine	Ottawa, ON
13	9	7	Daniel Joseph	Defensive lineman	North Carolina State	Toronto, ON
14	12	10	Alonzo Addae	Defensive back	West Virginia	Pickering, ON
15	6	3	Terrell Jana	Receiver	Virginia	Vancouver, BC
16	–	17	Bruno Labelle	Tight end	Cincinnati	Montreal, QC
17	19	14	Nelson Lokombo	Defensive back	Saskatchewan	Abbotsford, BC
18	16	12	Logan Bandy	Offensive lineman	Calgary	Calgary, AB
19	20	–	Bryce Bell	Offensive lineman	Wilfrid Laurier	Waterloo, ON
20	14	9	Deshawn Stevens	Linebacker	Maine	Toronto, ON
–	18	15	Luiji Vilain	Defensive lineman	Michigan	Ottawa, ON
–	–	16	Ben Hladik	Linebacker	British Columbia	Vernon, BC
–	–	18	Tyris Lebeau	Linebacker	Massachusetts	Montreal, QC
–	–	19	Grant McDonald	Linebacker	Calgary	Tsawwassen, BC
–	–	20	Nick Cross	Linebacker	British Columbia	Regina, SK

== Draft order ==
=== Round one ===
Pick #	CFL team	Player	Position	University
1	Hamilton Tiger-Cats	Jake Burt	TE	Boston College
2	Saskatchewan Roughriders	Nelson Lokombo	DB	Saskatchewan
3	Winnipeg Blue Bombers	Liam Dobson	OL	Texas State
4	BC Lions	Daniel Joseph	DL	North Carolina State
5	Edmonton Football Team	Cole Nelson	DL	Alberta
6	Ottawa Redblacks	Deshawn Stevens	LB	Maine
7	Toronto Argonauts	Peter Nicastro	OL	Calgary
8	Calgary Stampeders	Amen Ogbongbemiga	LB	Oklahoma State
9	Hamilton Tiger-Cats (via Montreal)	Nick Cross	LB	British Columbia

=== Round two ===
Pick #	CFL team	Player	Position	University
10	Montreal Alouettes	Pier-Olivier Lestage	OL	Montreal
11	Calgary Stampeders	Bryce Bell	OL	Wilfrid Laurier
12	Toronto Argonauts	Sage Doxtater	OL	New Mexico State
13	Ottawa Redblacks	Alonzo Addae	DB	West Virginia
14	Edmonton Football Team	Grant McDonald	LB	Calgary
15	BC Lions	Alaric Jackson	OL	Iowa
16	Winnipeg Blue Bombers	Redha Kramdi	DB	Montreal
17	Saskatchewan Roughriders	Terrell Jana	WR	Virginia
18	Hamilton Tiger-Cats	Deane Leonard	DB	Mississippi

=== Round three ===
Pick #	CFL team	Player	Position	University
19	Hamilton Tiger-Cats	Mohamed Diallo	DL	Central Michigan
20	Saskatchewan Roughriders	Bruno Labelle	TE	Cincinnati
21	Winnipeg Blue Bombers	Patrice Rene	DB	North Carolina
22	BC Lions	Ben Hladik	LB	British Columbia
23	Edmonton Football Team	Deonte Glover	RB	Shepherd
24	Ottawa Redblacks	Connor Berglof	OL	Saskatchewan
25	Toronto Argonauts	Luiji Vilain	DL	Michigan
26	Calgary Stampeders	Charlie Moore	LB	Calgary
27	Montreal Alouettes	Chris Fournier	OL	Lehigh

=== Round four ===
Pick #	CFL team	Player	Position	University
28	Montreal Alouettes	Patrick Davis	OL	Syracuse
29	Calgary Stampeders	Elliot Graham	LB	British Columbia
30	Toronto Argonauts	Tommy Nield	WR	McMaster
31	Ottawa Redblacks	Jake Julien	K/P	Eastern Michigan
32	Edmonton Football Team	Dominic Johnson	WR	Buffalo
33	Toronto Argonauts (via BC)	Trevor Hoyte	LB	Carleton
34	Winnipeg Blue Bombers	Robbie Lowes	LB	Regina
35	Saskatchewan Roughriders	Alain Cimankinda	DL	Guelph
36	Hamilton Tiger-Cats	Jarek Richards	LB	Saint Mary's

=== Round five ===
Pick #	CFL team	Player	Position	University
37	Hamilton Tiger-Cats	Felix Garand-Gauthier	FB	Laval
38	Saskatchewan Roughriders	Logan Bandy	OL	Calgary
39	Winnipeg Blue Bombers	Kyle Borsa	RB	Regina
40	BC Lions	Alfred Green	DL	Wilfrid Laurier
41	Edmonton Football Team	Peter Kourtis	OL	Saint Mary's
42	Ottawa Redblacks	Keegan Markgraf	LS	Utah
43	Calgary Stampeders (via Toronto)	Chuba Hubbard	RB	Oklahoma State
44	Calgary Stampeders	Luther Hakunavanhu	WR	York
45	Montreal Alouettes	David Côté	K	Laval

=== Round six ===
Pick #	CFL team	Player	Position	University
46	Montreal Alouettes	Ethan Makonzo	DB	Montreal
47	Toronto Argonauts (via Calgary)	Joshua Hagerty	DB	Saskatchewan
48	Winnipeg Blue Bombers (via Toronto)	Shae Weekes	DB	Manitoba
49	Ottawa Redblacks	Matthew Derks	OL	Delaware State
50	Edmonton Football Team	Kenan Clarke	DB	Cornell
51	BC Lions	Tyler Packer	OL	Calgary
52	Toronto Argonauts (via Winnipeg)	Benjamin St-Juste	DB	Minnesota
53	Saskatchewan Roughriders	Matt Watson	DB	Mount Allison
54	Hamilton Tiger-Cats	Myles Manalo	LB	Western

== Trades ==
In the explanations below, (D) denotes trades that took place during the draft, while (PD) indicates trades completed pre-draft.

=== Round one ===
- Montreal → Hamilton (PD). Montreal traded this selection, Jamaal Westerman, Chris Williams, and a first-round pick in the 2020 CFL draft to Hamilton in exchange for Johnny Manziel, Tony Washington, and Landon Rice.

=== Round four ===
- BC → Toronto (PD). BC traded this selection and Davon Coleman to Toronto in exchange for Shawn Lemon.

=== Round five ===
- Toronto → Calgary (PD). Toronto traded this selection and a third-round pick in the 2021 CFL global draft to Calgary in exchange for a sixth-round pick in this year's draft, a fourth-round pick in the 2021 CFL global draft, and the rights to Eric Rogers, Cordarro Law, and Robertson Daniel.

=== Round six ===
- Winnipeg ←→ Toronto (PD). Winnipeg traded the 52nd overall selection and the playing rights to Cody Speller to Toronto in exchange for the 48th overall selection.
- Calgary → Toronto (PD). Calgary traded this selection, a fourth-round pick in the 2021 CFL global draft, and the rights to Eric Rogers, Cordarro Law, and Robertson Daniel to Toronto in exchange for a fifth-round pick in this year's draft and a third-round pick in the 2021 CFL global draft.
