= Tyler Packer =

Canadian gridiron football player (born 1999)

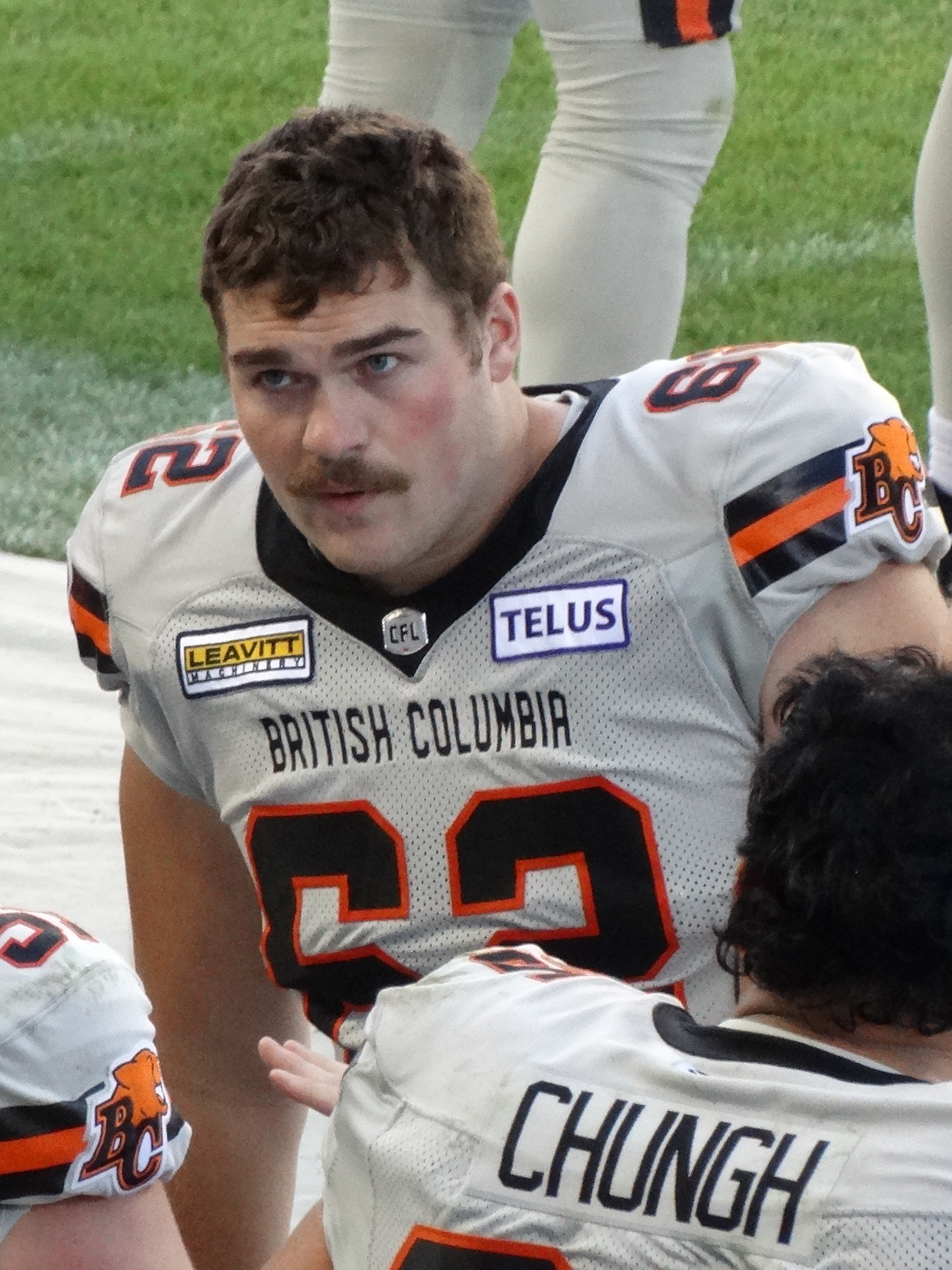
- Packer with the BC Lions in 2024

Profile
- Position: Offensive lineman

Personal information
- Born: July 13, 1999 (age 27); Calgary, Alberta, Canada
- Listed height: 6 ft 6 in (1.98 m)
- Listed weight: 300 lb (136 kg)

Career information
- High school: Notre Dame High
- College: Calgary
- CFL draft: 2021: 6th round, 51st overall pick

Career history
- 2021: BC Lions*
- 2022–2025: BC Lions
- 2026: Calgary Stampeders
- * Offseason or practice squad member only

Awards and highlights
- Vanier Cup champion (2019)
- Stats at CFL.ca

Tyler Packer (born July 13, 1999) is a Canadian professional football offensive lineman.

== University career ==
Packer played U Sports football for the Calgary Dinos from 2017 to 2021. He started at right tackle in the Dinos' 55th Vanier Cup victory over the Montreal Carabins in 2019. He did not play in 2020 due to the cancellation of the 2020 U Sports football season.

== Professional career ==
Pre-draft measurables
| Height | Weight | 40-yard dash | 20-yard shuttle | Three-cone drill | Broad jump | Bench press |
|---|---|---|---|---|---|---|
| 6 ft 6 1/2 in (1.99 m) | 302.5 lb (137 kg) | 5.60 s | 4.60 s | 7.66 s | 8 ft 5 in (2.57 m) | 27 reps |
All values from CFL Combine

=== BC Lions ===
Packer was selected in the sixth round, 51st overall, by the BC Lions in the 2021 CFL draft and signed with the team on May 21, 2021. However, he was released at the end of training camp on July 29, 2021, and returned to the Dinos. After completing his U Sports eligibility, Packer re-signed with the Lions on December 14, 2021.

In 2022, Packer began the season on the practice roster following training camp. He then made his professional debut on September 17, 2021, against the Calgary Stampeders in his hometown in his old university stadium at McMahon. He played in two regular season games, both against the Stampeders, as a backup offensive lineman in 2022 while spending the rest of the season on the practice roster. He re-signed with the Lions on November 28, 2022.

In the 2023 season, Packer spent most of the year on the practice roster, but dressed for one regular season game in September. He signed again with the Lions on November 22, 2023.

Following training camp in 2024, Packer made the team's opening day roster as a backup offensive lineman. After starting centre Michael Couture suffered an injury, Packer made his first professional start in the season's second game on June 15, 2024, against the Stampeders. He played in 13 regular season games, starting in 12, while sitting out the rest while on the injured list.

On June 6, 2025, Packer was placed on the Lions' 1-game injured list to start the 2025 CFL season. He rejoined the active roster on June 10, 2025. On July 4, 2025, Packer was placed on the Lions' 6-game injured list, where he spent the remainder of the 2025 CFL season.

On April 14, 2026, Packer was released by the Lions.

=== Calgary Stampeders ===
On October 7, 2026, it was announced that Packer had signed with the Calgary Stampeders. He was released at the end of the season.
