= Ben Hladik =

Canadian gridiron football player (born 1999)

- Hladik with the BC Lions in 2026

No. 46 – BC Lions
- Position: Linebacker
- Roster status: Active
- CFL status: National

Personal information
- Born: March 8, 1999 (age 27); Vernon, British Columbia, Canada
- Listed height: 6 ft 4 in (1.93 m)
- Listed weight: 235 lb (107 kg)

Career information
- High school: Vernon Secondary (BC)
- University: British Columbia
- CFL draft: 2021: 3rd round, 22nd overall pick

Career history
- BC Lions (2021–present)

Awards and highlights
- First-team All-Canadian (2018); Second-team All-Canadian (2019)
- Stats at CFL.ca

Ben Hladik (born March 8, 1999) is a Canadian professional football linebacker for the BC Lions of the Canadian Football League (CFL).

== University career ==
Hladik played U Sports football for the UBC Thunderbirds from 2017 to 2019. He played in 28 games where he had 189 total tackles, 6.5 sacks, two forced fumbles, seven fumble recoveries, and one interception that he returned 50 yards for a touchdown. He was named a U Sports First Team All-Canadian in 2018 and a Second Team All-Canadian in 2019 and served as the team's defensive captain in both years. He did not play in 2020 due to the cancellation of the 2020 U Sports football season but remained eligible for the 2021 CFL draft.

== Professional career ==
After not playing in 2020, Hladik was ranked as the 16th best prospect in the Canadian Football League's Amateur Scouting Bureau fall rankings for players eligible in the 2021 CFL draft. He did not appear in the winter or spring rankings, but was still projected to be a high draft pick. Hladik was drafted in the third round, 22nd overall, by the BC Lions in the 2021 draft and signed with the team on May 21, 2021.

He made the team's active roster following training camp and made his professional debut on August 6, 2021, against the Saskatchewan Roughriders. He recorded his first tackles against the Ottawa Redblacks on September 11, 2021, where he had two defensive tackles and two special teams tackles. He played in all 14 regular season games in 2021 where he had two defensive tackles and six special teams tackles.

In 2022, Hladik again made the team's opening day roster and earned more playing time on defense after mostly playing on special teams during his rookie season. Following an injury to Boseko Lokombo, Hladik made his first professional start at linebacker on July 21, 2022, where he had six defensive tackles. He later recorded his first career interception on August 6, 2022, against the Edmonton Elks, after picking off Taylor Cornelius. Due to his strong play, Hladik continued to start at linebacker following Lokombo's return to the active roster. He played in all 18 regular season games in 2022, starting in 13, where he recorded 59 defensive tackles, six special teams tackles, four pass knockdowns, two sacks, two interceptions, one forced fumble, and one fumble recovery.

On February 6, 2024, the Lions announced that Hladik had signed a two-year contract extension with the team.

On June 26, 2024, Hladik was placed on the Lions' 1-game injured list. He rejoined the active roster on July 6, 2024. On August 6, 2024, Hladik was again placed on the Lions' 1-game injured list. On September 5, Hladik was moved to the Lions' 6-game injured list. He rejoined the active roster on September 26, 2024.

On January 19, 2026, Hladik re-signed with the Lions, on a two-year contract extension.

On July 3, 2026, Hladik was placed on the Lions' 1-game injured list. He rejoined the active roster on July 16, 2026. On July 24, 2026, Hladik was placed on the Lions' 6-game injured list. He rejoined the active roster on September 11, 2026.

== Personal life ==
Hladik and his wife, Kailyn, were married in April 2020. Hladik's father, Scott, and grandfather, Frank, played high school football in Alberta while his brothers, Bradley and Andy, played football in Vernon.
