= Sage Doxtater =

Canadian gridiron football player (born 1998)

- Doxtater with the Montreal Alouettes in 2026

No. 65 – Montreal Alouettes
- Position: Offensive lineman
- Roster status: Active
- CFL status: National

Personal information
- Born: October 20, 1998 (age 28); Ontario, Canada
- Listed height: 6 ft 7 in (2.01 m)
- Listed weight: 343 lb (156 kg)

Career information
- High school: Canada Prep (St. Catharines, Ontario)
- College: New Mexico State
- NFL draft: 2022: undrafted
- CFL draft: 2021: 2nd round, 12th overall pick

Career history
- New Orleans Saints (2022)*; Arizona Cardinals (2022)*; New Orleans Saints (2022)*; Houston Roughnecks (2023); St. Louis Battlehawks (2024); Toronto Argonauts (2024–2025); Montreal Alouettes (2026–present)
- * Offseason or practice squad member only

Awards and highlights
- Grey Cup champion (2024)
- Stats at Pro Football Reference
- Stats at CFL.ca

Sage Doxtater (born October 20, 1998) is a Canadian professional football offensive lineman for the Montreal Alouettes of the Canadian Football League (CFL). He played college football at New Mexico State.

== Early life ==
Sage Doxtater was born on October 20, 1998. He is a native of the Oneida Nation of the Thames. His father was fatally stabbed before Doxtater was born. Doxtater was raised by his single mother, and grew up in Glencoe, Ontario. He played minor football with a team in London, Ontario, as his high school did not have a football team. He then enrolled at Canada Prep Academy in St. Catharines, and played a full American football schedule.

== College career ==
Doxtater played college football for the New Mexico State Aggies of New Mexico State University from 2016 to 2021. As a true freshman in 2016, he started the first nine games of the season at left tackle before missing the final three games due to injury. He was named to the 2016 Sun Belt All-Newcomer Team. He appeared in 12 games, starting 11, in 2017. Doxtater started all 12 games during the 2018 season. He missed the first half of his 2019 senior season due to injury before returning to play in four games (three starts). Doxtater was granted a redshirt for the 2019 season. The 2020 season was postponed to spring 2021 due to the COVID-19 pandemic. He played in one of the Aggies' two games during the spring 2021 season. Doxtater was granted another year of eligibility due to the pandemic. He was selected by the Toronto Argonauts in the second round, with the 12th overall pick, of the 2021 CFL draft. He finished his college career by playing in 12 games during the fall 2021 season as a team captain. He majored in sociology in college.

== Professional career ==
Pre-draft measurables
Height	Weight	Arm length	Hand span	Wingspan	40-yard dash	10-yard split	20-yard split	20-yard shuttle	Three-cone drill	Vertical jump	Broad jump	Bench press
6 ft 6 1/4 in (1.99 m)	317 lb (144 kg)	33 3/4 in (0.86 m)	9 3/8 in (0.24 m)	6 ft 11 1/4 in (2.11 m)	5.40 s	1.86 s	3.03 s	4.99 s	8.17 s	28.0 in (0.71 m)	8 ft 5 in (2.57 m)	27 reps
All values from Pro Day

At New Mexico State's pro day, he posted 27 bench press reps, a 28-inch vertical jump, an 8.5 foot broad jump, and a 5.38 split in the 40-yard dash. Doxtater signed with the New Orleans Saints on May 13, 2022, after going undrafted in the 2022 NFL draft. He was waived/injured on August 18 with an elbow injury, and placed on injured reserve the next day. He was released with an injury settlement on August 23, 2022.

Doxtater was signed to the practice squad of the Arizona Cardinals on October 16, 2022. He was released on November 1, re-signed to the practice squad on November 9, and released again on November 15, 2022.

Doxtater was signed to the Saints' practice squad on January 4, 2023. He became a free agent after the 2022–23 season.

Doxtater then started five games for the Houston Roughnecks of the XFL in 2023 while also missing five games due to injury.

Doxtater signed with the St. Louis Battlehawks of the United Football League (UFL) on January 22, 2024. However, he suffered a season-ending hand injury in training camp, and was placed on injured reserve on March 10, 2024. After his injury, he quit his vegetarian diet and started eating meat.

Doxtater was signed to the Toronto Argonauts' practice roster on October 5, 2024. He remained on the practice roster as Toronto won the 111th Grey Cup against the Winnipeg Blue Bombers on November 17, 2024, by a score of 41–24. Doxtater re-signed with Toronto on December 2, 2024. Doxtater was released on March 9, 2026.

On March 25, 2026, Doxtater signed with the Montreal Alouettes.
