= Pier-Olivier Lestage =

Canadian gridiron football player (born 1997)

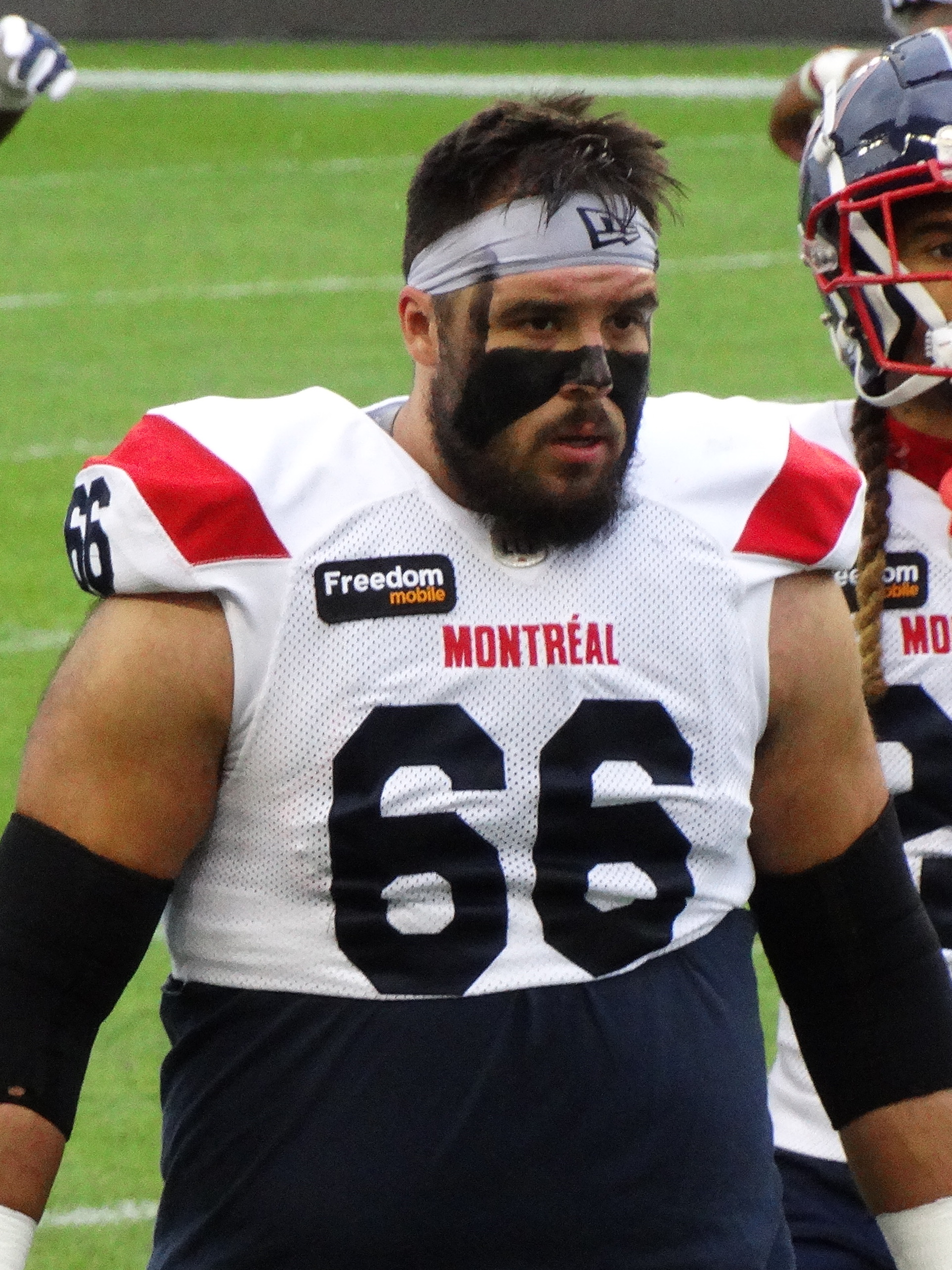
- Lestage with the Montreal Alouettes in 2024

No. 66 – Montreal Alouettes
- Position: Offensive lineman
- Roster status: Active
- CFL status: National

Personal information
- Born: August 4, 1997 (age 29); Saint-Eustache, Quebec, Canada
- Listed height: 6 ft 3 in (1.91 m)
- Listed weight: 305 lb (138 kg)

Career information
- CEGEP: Saint-Jean-sur-Richelieu
- University: Montreal
- CFL draft: 2021: 2nd round, 10th overall pick

Career history
- Seattle Seahawks (2021)*; Montreal Alouettes (2022–present)
- * Offseason or practice squad member only

Awards and highlights
- Grey Cup champion (2023); 2× CFL East All-Star (2025, 2026)
- Stats at Pro Football Reference
- Stats at CFL.ca

Pier-Olivier Lestage (born August 4, 1997) is a Canadian professional football offensive lineman for the Montreal Alouettes of the Canadian Football League (CFL).

== University career ==
Lestage played U Sports football for the Montreal Carabins from 2017 to 2019. He was a U Sports Second Team All-Canadian in 2019. He did not play in 2020 due to the cancellation of the 2020 U Sports football season.

== Professional career ==
Pre-draft measurables
| Height | Weight | Arm length | Hand span | Wingspan |
|---|---|---|---|---|
| 6 ft 3 1/8 in (1.91 m) | 312 lb (142 kg) | 33 in (0.84 m) | 9 5/8 in (0.24 m) | 6 ft 6 1/2 in (1.99 m) |
All values from Pro Day

=== Seattle Seahawks ===
Lestage was signed as an undrafted free agent by the Seattle Seahawks on May 1, 2021. He spent the 2021 season on the team's practice roster and was released on June 22, 2022.

=== Montreal Alouettes ===
Lestage had been drafted in the second round, tenth overall, by the Montreal Alouettes in the 2021 CFL draft. After exhausting his National Football League opportunities, he signed with the Alouettes on July 31, 2022. He soon after made his professional debut on August 4, 2022, against the Winnipeg Blue Bombers as a backup offensive lineman. Lestage then made his first career start on September 23, 2023, against the Hamilton Tiger-Cats. He played in 11 regular season games in 2022 and started the final six games of the season.

In 2023, Lestage won a starting job in training camp and started 17 games during the regular season, while missing one game in July due to injury. However, he suffered a knee injury near the end of the season and did not play in any post-season games that year and was on the injured list when the Alouettes won the 110th Grey Cup. For his strong play in 2023, Lestage was the Alouettes' nominee for the CFL's Most Outstanding Offensive Lineman Award.
