= Mohamed Diallo (Canadian football) =

Canadian football player (born 1997)

No. 26
- Position: Defensive tackle

Personal information
- Born: October 10, 1997 (age 29); Toronto, Ontario, Canada
- Listed height: 6 ft 5 in (1.96 m)
- Listed weight: 305 lb (138 kg)

Career information
- High school: Eastern Commerce (Toronto, ON)
- College: Arizona Western College; Texas A&M; Central Michigan; Arizona
- CFL draft: 2021: 3rd round, 19th overall pick

Career history
- 2022–2023: Hamilton Tiger-Cats

Awards and highlights
- First-team All-MAC (2020)
- Stats at CFL.ca

Mohamed Diallo (born October 10, 1997) is a Canadian former professional football defensive tackle who played for the Hamilton Tiger-Cats of the Canadian Football League (CFL). He played college football at Arizona Western College, Texas A&M, Central Michigan and Arizona.

== Early life ==
Diallo attended Eastern Commerce Collegiate Institute in Toronto but did not play football.

== College career ==
Diallo played college football at Arizona Western College from 2016 to 2017, recording career totals of 30 tackles, two sacks, one forced fumble and one fumble recovery.

Diallo transferred to play Texas A&M in 2018, appearing in one game.

Diallo transferred to play at Central Michigan from 2019 to 2020. He played in six games, starting four, in 2019 and totaled seven tackles. He appeared in four games, all starts, in the COVID-19 shortened 2020 season, accumulating 19 tackles, three sacks, one forced fumble and one fumble recovery, earning first team All-Mid-American Conference (MAC) honors.

Diallo transferred to Arizona in 2021. He played in 11 games, starting six, in 2021, recording 35 tackles and 4.5 sacks.

== Professional career ==
Diallo was selected by the Hamilton Tiger-Cats of the Canadian Football League (CFL) in the third round, with the 19th overall pick, of the 2021 CFL draft. He signed with the team on June 1, 2022. He was placed on, and activated from, injured reserve several times during the 2022 season. Overall, Diallo dressed in 16 games, starting two, for the Tiger-Cats in 2022, totaling eight tackles on defense and one sack. Like the previous season, he was placed on, and activated from, injured reserve several times in 2023. Overall, he dressed for 11 games, starting six, in 2023, recording nine tackles on defense and one sack. Diallo was released on May 12, 2024.
