= Bryce Bell =

Canadian gridiron football player (born 1998)

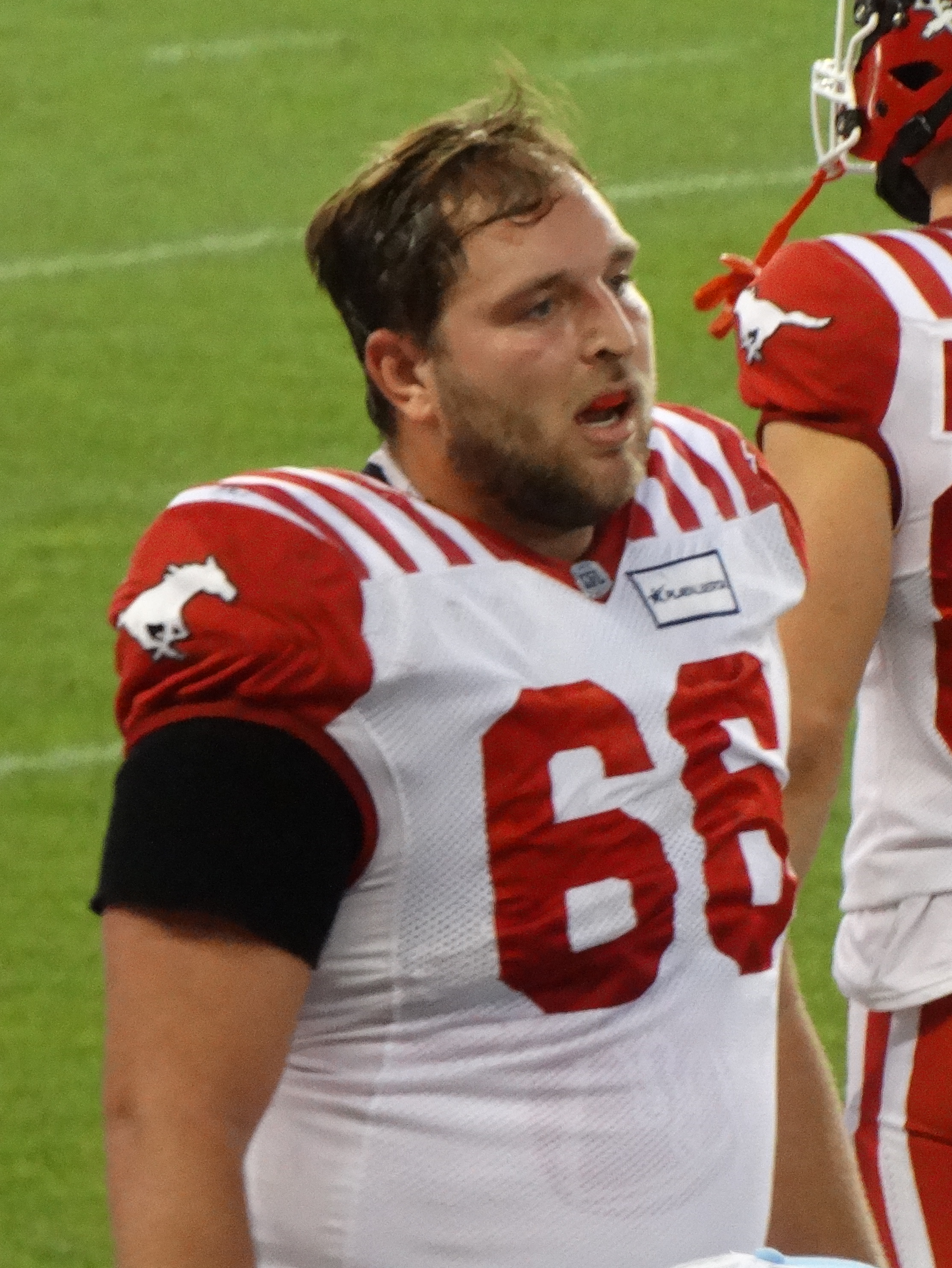
- Bell with the Calgary Stampeders in 2024

No. 66 – Calgary Stampeders
- Position: Offensive lineman
- Roster status: Active
- CFL status: National

Personal information
- Born: April 3, 1998 (age 28); Waterloo, Ontario, Canada
- Listed height: 6 ft 4 in (1.93 m)
- Listed weight: 304 lb (138 kg)

Career information
- High school: Sir John A. Macdonald Secondary
- University: Wilfrid Laurier
- CFL draft: 2021: 2nd round, 11th overall pick

Career history
- 2021–present: Calgary Stampeders
- Stats at CFL.ca

Bryce Bell (born April 3, 1998) is a Canadian professional football offensive lineman for the Calgary Stampeders of the Canadian Football League (CFL).

== University career ==
Bell played U Sports football for the Wilfrid Laurier Golden Hawks from 2016 to 2019. He was part of the 2016 Yates Cup championship team and played in 26 regular season games for the program over four seasons. He did not play in 2020 due to the cancellation of the 2020 U Sports football season.

== Professional career ==
Pre-draft measurables
Height	Weight	40-yard dash	20-yard shuttle	Three-cone drill	Broad jump	Bench press
6 ft 3 5/8 in (1.92 m)	295 lb (134 kg)	5.56 s	4.70 s	8.06 s	8 ft 9 1/2 in (2.68 m)	16 reps
All values from CFL Combine

Bell was drafted in the second round, 11th overall, by the Calgary Stampeders in the 2021 CFL draft and signed with the team on May 18, 2021. He made the team's active roster following training camp and made his professional debut on August 7, 2021, against the Toronto Argonauts. He played in 13 out of 14 regular season games in 2021 where he had three starts at right tackle and one at left tackle. Bell also played in the team's West Semi-Final loss to the Saskatchewan Roughriders.

In 2022, Bell began the season as a backup offensive lineman, but became a starter at centre in the team's seventh game of the season following an injury to Sean McEwen.

== Personal life ==
Bell was born to parents Karen and Greg Bell and has two sisters, Hilary and Kathleen.
