= Grant McDonald (Canadian football) =

Canadian football player (born 1999)

No. 33, 29
- Position: Linebacker

Personal information
- Born: July 14, 1999 (age 27); Tsawwassen, British Columbia, Canada
- Listed height: 6 ft 4 in (1.93 m)
- Listed weight: 220 lb (100 kg)

Career information
- High school: South Delta (Tsawwassen)
- College: Maine (2017); Calgary (2018–2019)
- CFL draft: 2021: 2nd round, 14th overall pick

Career history
- 2021: Edmonton Elks
- 2022: Hamilton Tiger-Cats

Awards and highlights
- All-Canadian First Team (Canada Football Chat) (2016); Hardy Cup champion (2019); Vanier Cup champion (2019)
- Stats at CFL.ca

Grant McDonald (born July 14, 1999) is a Canadian former professional football linebacker who played for the Edmonton Elks and Hamilton Tiger-Cats of the Canadian Football League (CFL). He was drafted by the Elks with the 14th overall selection in the 2021 CFL draft. From 2018 to 2019, he played U Sports football for the University of Calgary Dinos, where he was a Vanier Cup champion in 2019. Prior to transferring to Calgary in 2018, he attended and played one season for the University of Maine Black Bears of the Colonial Athletic Association (CAA) in the NCAA Division I Football Championship Subdivision (FCS) in 2017.

== Early life ==
McDonald began playing football at age 9 for the Delta Rams in his hometown of Tsawwassen, British Columbia. He also played lacrosse growing up.

In high school, he attended and played football for the South Delta Secondary School Sun Devils in Tsawwassen. At South Delta, he was a two-way standout player, playing both offense and defense at running back and linebacker, respectively. He was regarded as one of the most dominant players in the highest level Canadian high school league of the British Columbia Secondary Schools Football Association (BCSSFA) in which he played, according to Bleacher Report.

In 2014, as a 10th grader, he led South Delta to a division championship, including scoring two touchdowns in title game and being named the AAA Provincial Championship game MVP.

In 2015, as a junior linebacker and running back, he led the BCSSFA Division AAA in tackles (103) and yards per carry (9.2), and ranked second in rushing yards (1,217) in 11 games played. He also recorded an interception on defense and scored 16 touchdowns on offensive.

In 2016, as a junior, he struggled with an ankle injury, which forced him to miss several games. He returned to the field to help the Sun Devils reach the provincial semifinals. His junior performance earned him 2016 Canada Football Chat All-Canadians First Team honors. He was honored as the South Delta Secondary Sportsperson of the Year and the 2017 Young Athlete of the Year.

As a college football recruit, he was the No. 9 overall high school prospect and No. 1 linebacker in Canada, per Canada Football Chat. He committed to attend and play college football at the University of Maine over offers from British Columbia, Calgary, Regina, Western, Manitoba, Buffalo, and North Dakota.

== College career ==
=== 2017 (Maine) ===
McDonald entered his freshman season for the Maine Black Bears as a tight end, a new position at which he had never played previously. During the Black Bears' 2017 season, he appeared in nine games with the majority of his playing time coming on special teams, where he recorded seven tackles and a forced fumble.

=== 2018 (Calgary) ===
Following his freshman season at Maine, McDonald transferred to the University of Calgary in Alberta, where joined his older brother, Jack, a wide receiver, on the Dinos football team in the Canada West Conference. He has cited to the opportunity to play with Jack as a driving factor in his decision to transfer to Calgary.

In 2018, McDonald helped the Dinos achieve an undefeated 8–0 regular season and advance to the Hardy Cup. In his Calgary debut against Regina, he recorded eight tackles and 0.5 tackle for loss. In one of his best performances of the season, he recorded four tackles, two tackles for loss, and two sacks in Calgary's 34–16 win against Manitoba.

In his first career playoff game, he recorded a team-high nine tackles in the Dino's Canada West semifinal victory over Manitoba. The following week, in the Hardy Cup, he made eight tackles, including seven solo tackles, in Calgary's loss to Saskatchewan.

He finished the 2018 season leading his team in both tackles (54) and solo tackles (38). He also recorded 6.5 tackles for loss, two sacks, and one forced fumble.

=== 2019 (Calgary) ===
After going 6–2 in the regular season, the Dinos won four playoff games en route to becoming Vanier Cup champions after their victory over the Montreal Carabins.

On November 2, 2019, McDonald recorded a career-high 13 tackles (12 solo), as well as one tackle for loss and one sack in Calgary's 47–46 victory over Manitoba in the Canada West Playoffs semifinals. The following week, he led his team in tackles (11) for the second consecutive game and again recorded one tackle for loss and one sack in the Dino's 29–4 win over Saskatchewan to earn the Hardy Cup title and advance to the Mitchell Bowl.

He made seven tackles (six solo) and scored the Dino's lone second half touchdown on a 2-yard reception in Calgary's 30–17 victory over McMaster in the U Sports Mitchell Bowl, earning defensive MVP and helping the Dinos advance to the 55th Vanier Cup championship game against Montreal.

In the Vanier Cup, he led the Dinos with 11 tackles (five solo), as well as a pass breakup, in Calgary's 27–13 victory over Montreal. The win earned Calgary its fifth ever Vanier Cup title and its first since 1995.

He finished the 2019 season as the Dinos' leading tackler by a wide margin with 88 tackles, including 65 solo tackles, (second-highest Calgary tackler registered 52 tackles) and tied for the team lead in both tackles for loss (8) and sacks (4.5).

McDonald did not play football in 2020 after the season was cancelled due to the COVID-19 pandemic. He finished his collegiate career with 149 tackles (109 solo), 14.5 tackles for loss, 6.5 sacks, two forced fumbles, and one interception. He was invited to the 2021 College Gridiron Showcase held in Fort Worth, Texas in January 2021.

== Professional career ==
Pre-draft measurables
Height	Weight	40-yard dash	20-yard shuttle	Three-cone drill	Broad jump	Bench press
6 ft 3 5/8 in (1.92 m)	231.8 lb (105 kg)	4.56 s	4.46 s	7.56 s	9 ft 3 3/8 in (2.83 m)	17 reps
All values from CFL Combine

=== Edmonton Elks ===
McDonald was the No. 13 draft prospect entering the 2021 CFL draft, per 3DownNation. In the draft, the Edmonton Elks selected him with the 14th overall (Round 2, Pick 5) pick.

As a rookie, he appeared in 14 games for the Elks. In his professional football and CFL debut, he registered his best game of his rookie campaign, making four tackles on special teams against the Ottawa Redblacks. As a rookie, he made 16 special teams tackles on the season and led the Elks in special teams tackles.

=== Hamilton Tiger-Cats ===
On May 2, 2022, McDonald was traded to the Hamilton Tiger-Cats along with Kyle Saxelid and the second overall selection in the 2022 CFL global draft in exchange for the eighth and 28th overall selections in the 2022 CFL National Draft and the ninth overall selection in the 2022 CFL Global Draft. He played in all 18 regular season games during the 2022 season and contributed with eight special teams tackles.

After two seasons of professional football McDonald announced his retirement with the intention of pursuing a career as a fire fighter in his home province of British Columbia.

== Career statistics ==
=== CFL ===
Season	Team	GP	DT	STT	Sck	Int	FF	FR	TD
2021	EDM	14	0	16	0	0	0	0	0
2022	HAM	18	0	8	0	0	0	0	0
Total		32	0	24	0	0	0	0	0

=== College ===
Season	Team	G	Tot	Solo	TFL	Sack	INT	PD	FF	FR
2017	Maine	9	7	6	0	0	0	0	1	0
2018	Calgary	9	54	38	6.5	2.0	0	0	1	0
2019	Calgary	11	88	65	8.0	4.5	1	2	0	0
Total		29	149	109	14.5	6.5	1	2	2	0

== Personal life ==
McDonald's father, Bruce, played CIAU football at the University of British Columbia, where he was a starting defensive back for five seasons, and was also drafted in the CFL. McDonald's younger brother, Ben, enrolled at the University of Calgary in 2020, where he is now a quarterback on the Dinos football team. At Calgary, he majored in Arts.
