= Wycliffe, British Columbia =

Human settlement in British Columbia, Canada

Coordinates: 49°35′52.4″N 115°52′04.4″W

Wycliffe is a small community in British Columbia, Canada. It is located between Cranbrook and Kimberley on the Kimberley Highway.

== Notable residents ==
- Frank Stojack, National Football League player
- Dustin Nielson, TSN Radio Host, Sports Broadcaster
