= Luiji Vilain =

Canadian gridiron football player (born 1998)

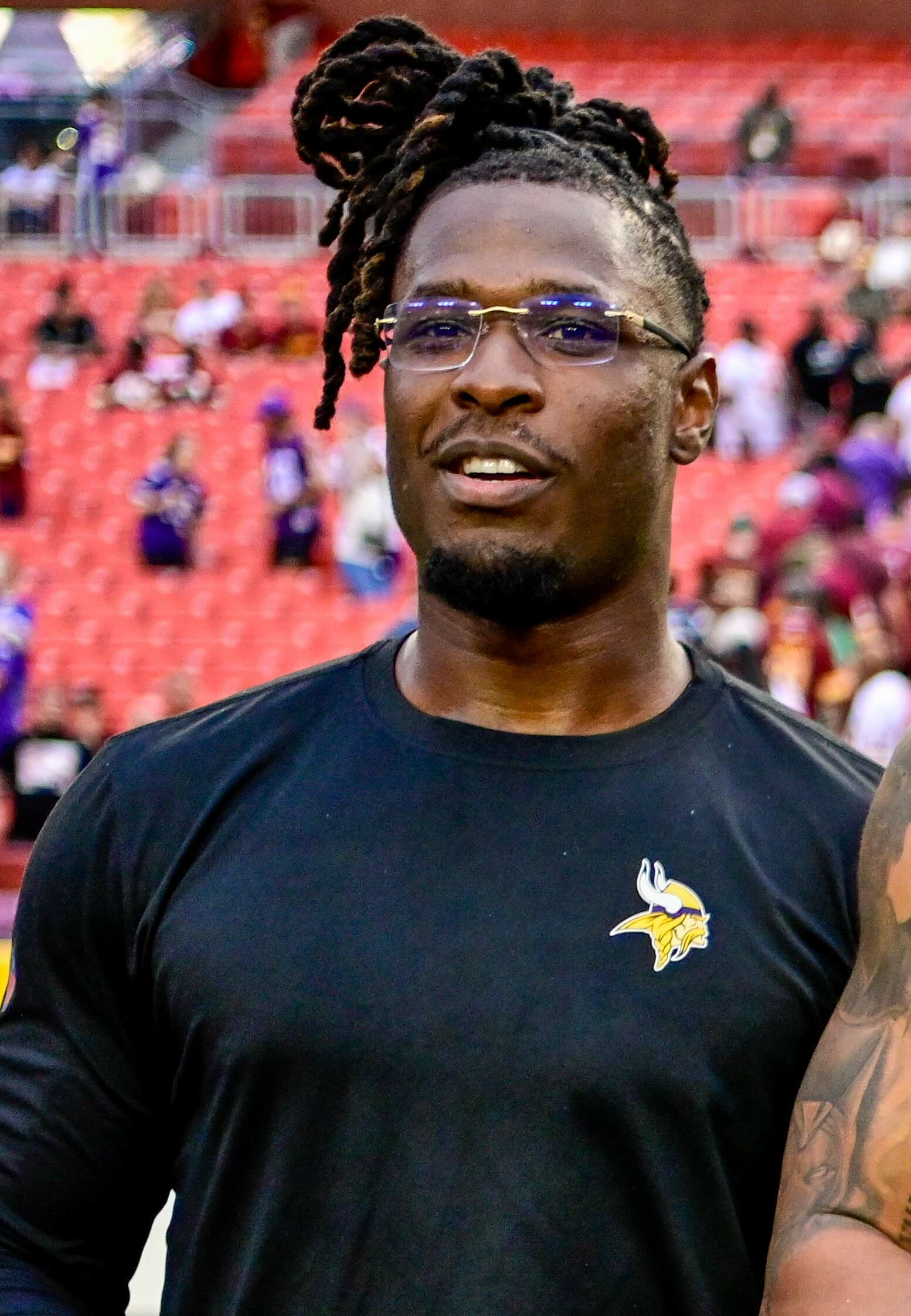
- Vilain with the Vikings in 2022

Ottawa Redblacks
- Position: Defensive end
- Roster status: Active
- CFL status: National

Personal information
- Born: March 10, 1998 (age 28); Ottawa, Ontario, Canada
- Listed height: 6 ft 4 in (1.93 m)
- Listed weight: 255 lb (116 kg)

Career information
- High school: Episcopal (Alexandria, Virginia, U.S.)
- College: Michigan (2017–2020); Wake Forest (2021)
- NFL draft: 2022: undrafted
- CFL draft: 2021: 3rd round, 25th overall pick

Career history
- Minnesota Vikings (2022–2023); Carolina Panthers (2023); Cleveland Browns (2024)*; Dallas Cowboys (2024–2025)*; Ottawa Redblacks (2026–present)
- * Offseason or practice squad member only

Career NFL statistics
- Total tackles: 4
- Stats at Pro Football Reference
- Stats at CFL.ca

Luiji Vilain (born March 10, 1998) is a Canadian professional football defensive end for the Ottawa Redblacks of the Canadian Football League (CFL). He played college football for the Michigan Wolverines and Wake Forest Demon Deacons. He was signed by the Minnesota Vikings as an undrafted free agent in 2022.

== Early life ==
Vilain was born on March 10, 1998, in Ottawa, Ontario. He attended Episcopal High School in Virginia, where he played for head coach Panos Voulgaris. As a junior, he recorded 60 tackles, 15.5 tackles-for-loss, 4.5 sacks, three forced fumbles and one recovered, earning second-team All-USA Virginia by USA Today and first-team All-IAC. As a senior, Vilain made 45 tackles and eight sacks as well as a fumble recovered in the end zone for a touchdown. He was named first-team All-USA by USA Today, first-team All-Met by The Washington Post, and first-team All-IAC. He was invited to the Under Armour All-America Game and was a PrepStar Top 359 All-American player. Scout.com ranked him the top defensive end in Virginia and a four-star recruit. He was a four-star prospect according to ESPN, and was named the second-best player in Virginia, as well as the 102nd best nationally.

== College career ==
Vilain committed to the University of Michigan after graduating from Episcopal High School. In his first two seasons (2017, freshman; 2018, sophomore), he did not see any game action. He was an Academic All-Big Ten Conference selection in 2018. Prior to his junior year, Vilain moved from Toronto to the United States. As a junior in 2019, he played in seven games as a defensive lineman and made seven tackles, one tackle-for-loss, one sack, and one forced fumble, earning his first varsity letter. As a senior in the 2020 season, Vilain appeared in five games, recording four tackles for a second varsity letter.

In 2021, Vilain announced his intention to transfer. He transferred to Wake Forest for his fifth season, being given an extra year of eligibility due to the COVID-19 pandemic. In May, he was drafted in the third round (25th overall) of the Canadian Football League (CFL) Draft by the Toronto Argonauts, but chose to remain in college.

As a fifth-year senior with Wake Forest in 2021, Vilain recorded a team-leading 9.0 sacks while also making 10.0 tackles-for-loss. He was one of three Wake Forest players to have double-digit tackles-for-loss and had a streak of four consecutive games with a sack.

== Professional career ==
Pre-draft measurables
Height	Weight	Arm length	Hand span	Wingspan	40-yard dash	10-yard split	20-yard split	20-yard shuttle	Three-cone drill	Vertical jump	Broad jump	Bench press
6 ft 3 5/8 in (1.92 m)	255 lb (116 kg)	34 in (0.86 m)	10 7/8 in (0.28 m)	6 ft 8 1/2 in (2.04 m)	4.81 s	1.57 s	2.69 s	4.35 s	7.01 s	35.0 in (0.89 m)	9 ft 10 in (3.00 m)	20 reps
All values from Pro Day

Vilain was drafted in the third round, 25th overall, by the Toronto Argonauts in the 2021 CFL draft, although he did not sign with the team as he had one year of college playing eligibility remaining.

=== Minnesota Vikings ===
After going unselected in the 2022 NFL draft, Vilain was signed as an undrafted free agent by the Minnesota Vikings. Kwity Paye, an All-Rookie defensive lineman with the Indianapolis Colts, who was roommates with Vilain at Michigan, said "I think the Vikings got a big steal getting him in free agency. He's just that type of player where I feel he didn't get his fair chance at Michigan, but he’s going to definitely maximize his opportunity and give the Vikings everything he has. He's an extremely gifted athlete." After having a solid training camp and impressing in preseason with a fumble return and interception, he made the Vikings' final roster. Vilain only appeared in three games for Minnesota in 2022, totaling four tackles. He was waived on August 29, 2023, and signed to the practice squad the next day.

=== Carolina Panthers ===
On October 24, 2023, Vilain was signed by the Carolina Panthers off the Vikings practice squad. He was placed on injured reserve on November 7.

On August 27, 2024, Vilain was waived by the Panthers.

=== Cleveland Browns ===
On September 11, 2024, Vilain was signed to the Cleveland Browns' practice squad, and released two weeks later.

=== Dallas Cowboys ===
On October 9, 2024, Vilain was signed to the Dallas Cowboys' practice squad. He signed a reserve/future contract with Dallas on January 6, 2025. On July 22, Vilain was released by the Cowboys.

=== Ottawa Redblacks ===
On April 21, 2026, Vilain's CFL playing rights were traded from the Toronto Argonauts to the Ottawa Redblacks as he had cited a desire to play in his hometown. On April 27, the Redblacks announced that he had signed a three-year contract with the team.
