= Terrence Ganyi =

Canadian gridiron football player (born 1999)

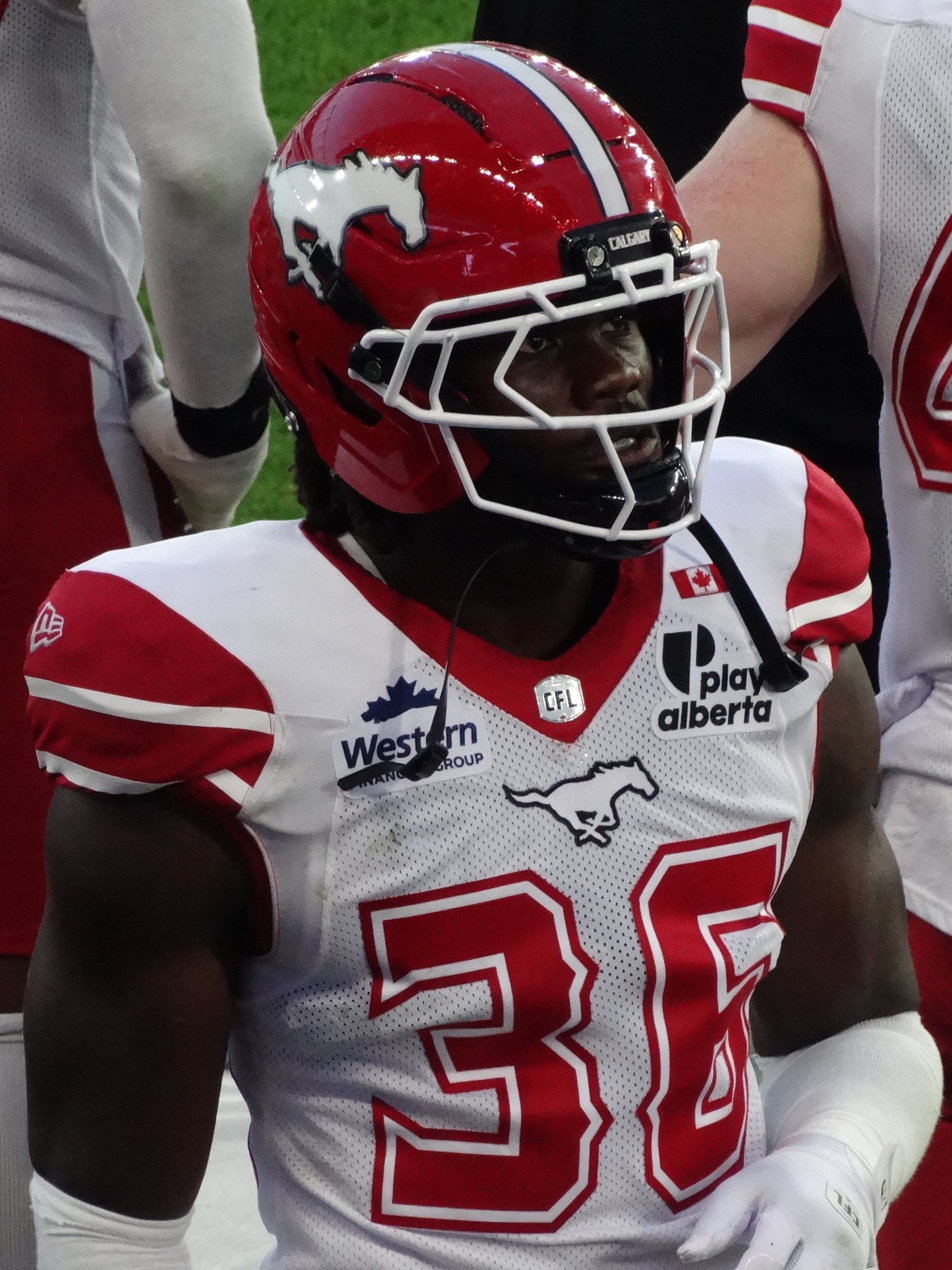
- Ganyi with the Calgary Stampeders in 2026

No. 36 – Calgary Stampeders
- Position: Linebacker
- Roster status: Active
- CFL status: National

Personal information
- Born: 16 March 1999 (age 27); Montreal, Quebec, Canada
- Listed height: 6 ft 0 in (1.83 m)
- Listed weight: 218 lb (99 kg)

Career information
- High school: Dalbé-Viau (Lachine, Quebec)
- College: UConn (2018–2021); Maine (2022–2023)
- CFL draft: 2024: 6th round, 53rd overall pick

Career history
- BC Lions (2024–2026); Calgary Stampeders (2026–present)
- Stats at CFL.ca

Terrence Ganyi (born 16 March 1999) is a Canadian professional football linebacker for the Calgary Stampeders of the Canadian Football League (CFL). He played college football for the UConn Huskies and the Maine Black Bears.

== College career ==
Ganyi played college football for the UConn Huskies from 2018 to 2021 and the Maine Black Bears from 2022 to 2023. He played in 11 games for the Huskies and finished with 13 tackles and returned a kickoff for five yards. Ganyi transferred to Maine where he dressed in 11 games across his final two years, making 12 tackles, including 0.5 tackles for loss.

== Professional career ==
Pre-draft measurables
Height	Weight	Arm length	Hand span	Wingspan	40-yard dash	20-yard shuttle	Three-cone drill	Vertical jump	Broad jump	Bench press
6 ft 0 1/8 in (1.83 m)	218 lb (99 kg)	31 in (0.79 m)	9 5/8 in (0.24 m)	6 ft 6 1/4 in (1.99 m)	4.88 s	4.38 s	7.07 s	29.5 in (0.75 m)	9 ft 3.5 in (2.83 m)	10 reps
All values from CFL Combine

=== BC Lions ===
Ganyi was selected in the sixth round with the 53rd pick of the 2024 CFL draft by the BC Lions and signed with the team on May 7. In 2024, he appeared in 17 games, making seven special teams tackles.

On June 18, 2026, Ganyi was assigned to the Lions' practice roster. On June 25, 2026, Ganyi was released by the Lions.

=== Calgary Stampeders ===
On June 29, 2026, Ganyi signed with the Calgary Stampeders.
