= Benjamin St-Juste =

Canadian gridiron football player (born 1997)

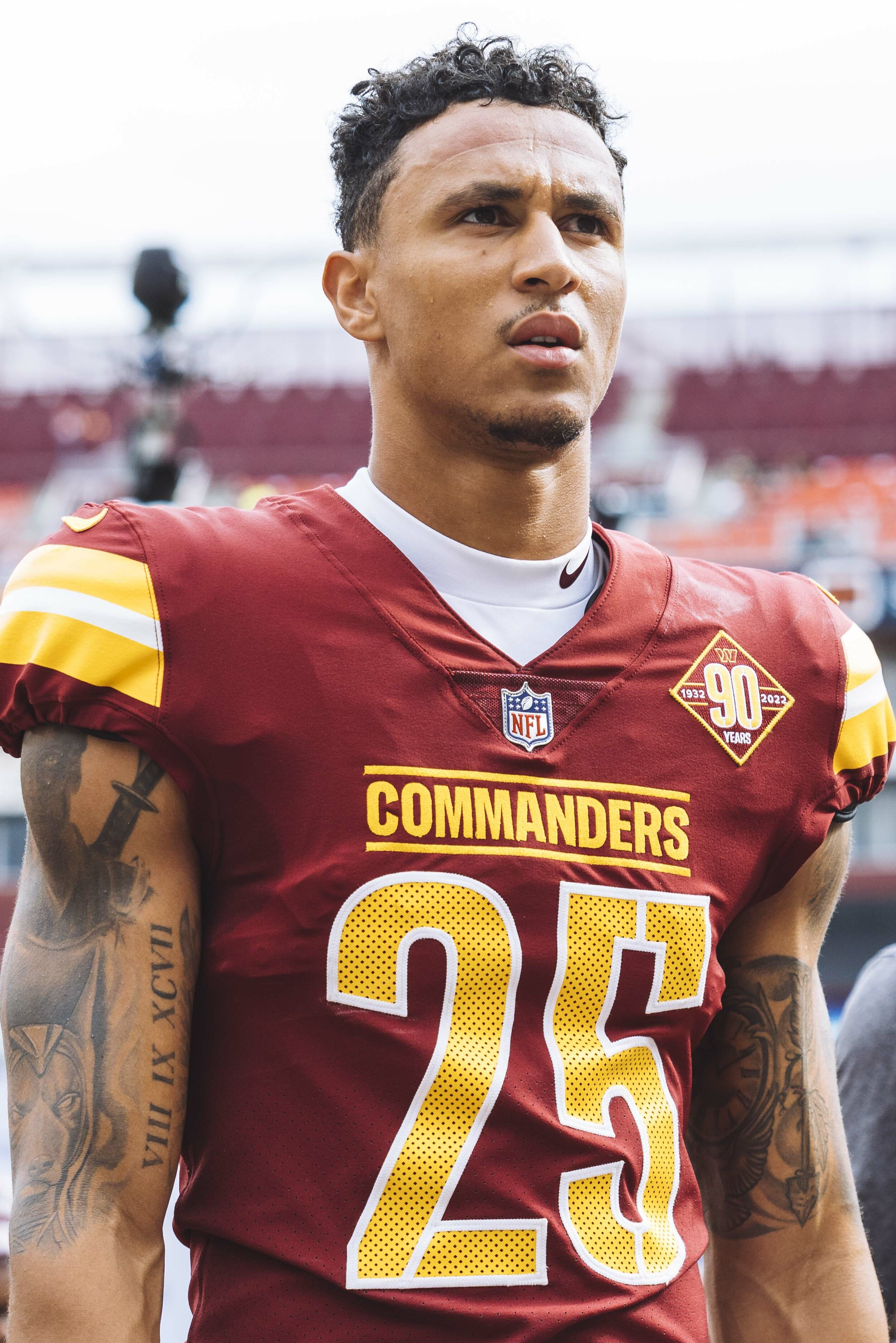
- St-Juste with the Washington Commanders in 2022

No. 21 – Green Bay Packers
- Position: Cornerback
- Roster status: Active

Personal information
- Born: September 8, 1997 (age 29); Montreal, Quebec, Canada
- Listed height: 6 ft 3 in (1.91 m)
- Listed weight: 200 lb (91 kg)

Career information
- High school: Cégep du Vieux Montréal (Montreal)
- College: Michigan (2017–2018); Minnesota (2019–2020)
- NFL draft: 2021: 3rd round, 74th overall pick
- CFL draft: 2021: 6th round, 52nd overall pick

Career history
- Washington Football Team / Commanders (2021–2024); Los Angeles Chargers (2025); Green Bay Packers (2026–present)

Career NFL statistics as of Week 10, 2026
- Tackles: 245
- Sacks: 3
- Forced fumbles: 4
- Fumble recoveries: 1
- Pass deflections: 41
- Interceptions: 2
- Stats at Pro Football Reference

Benjamin St-Juste (/seɪntˈdʒuːst/ saint-JOOST; born September 8, 1997) is a Canadian professional football cornerback for the Green Bay Packers of the National Football League (NFL). A native of Montreal, he played college football for the Michigan Wolverines and Minnesota Golden Gophers prior to being selected by Washington Football Team in the third round of the 2021 NFL draft.

== Early life ==
St-Juste was born on September 8, 1997, in Montreal, Canada, to a Haitian father and French-Canadian mother. He grew up speaking French and Haitian Creole before learning English at Cégep du Vieux Montréal. St-Juste played ice hockey as a youth, later taking an interest in American football because of his father Wilbert, who was a member of the 1989 Miami Hurricanes football team but broke his leg in preseason camp.

== College career ==
St-Juste attended various college football camps in the United States in the mid-2010s, and was offered a scholarship to play for the Michigan Wolverines under Jim Harbaugh. He played in 12 games for the Wolverines as a freshman in 2017, but redshirted as a sophomore the following year due to a hamstring injury. He graduated from Michigan in two years with a bachelor's degree in sports management and transferred to the University of Minnesota as a graduate student in 2019. St-Juste played in 18 games and had 59 tackles in two years for the Minnesota Golden Gophers before finishing his collegiate career. He was invited to the 2021 Senior Bowl, where he recorded a tackle.

== Professional career ==
Pre-draft measurables
Height	Weight	Arm length	Hand span	Wingspan	40-yard dash	10-yard split	20-yard split	20-yard shuttle	Three-cone drill	Vertical jump	Broad jump	Bench press
6 ft 3 1/4 in (1.91 m)	202 lb (92 kg)	32 5/8 in (0.83 m)	9 3/8 in (0.24 m)	6 ft 6 5/8 in (2.00 m)	4.52 s	1.57 s	2.65 s	4.01 s	6.63 s	34.5 in (0.88 m)	9 ft 11 in (3.02 m)	11 reps
All values from Pro Day

=== Washington Football Team / Commanders ===
St-Juste was selected by the Washington Football Team in the third round (74th overall) of the 2021 NFL draft, in which they took St-Juste with one of the two picks they acquired in a trade that sent Trent Williams to the San Francisco 49ers. He was also selected by the Toronto Argonauts in the sixth round (52nd overall) of the 2021 CFL draft shortly after. St-Juste signed his four-year rookie contract with Washington on May 13, 2021. He made his NFL debut in the opening game against the Los Angeles Chargers, where he recorded four tackles, but also allowed six catches in a 20–16 loss. He was placed on injured reserve in December 2021 due to lingering issues from a concussion.

St-Juste moved from outside corner to the slot for the 2022 season. He was moved back to outside corner following the benching of William Jackson III in Week 5. With 35 seconds remaining and the Chicago Bears on fourth and goal, St-Juste made a key stop pushing wide receiver Darnell Mooney, who caught the pass, out of the endzone before Mooney's feet landed on the field and sealed the Commanders' 12-7 victory. In Week 9 against the Minnesota Vikings, he deflected a touchdown pass attempt from Kirk Cousins which cornerback Danny Johnson intercepted. The following week's victory over the then-undefeated Philadelphia Eagles, St-Juste forced wide receiver Quez Watkins, after catching a 50-yard pass, to fumble the ball allowing safety Darrick Forrest to recover it. On January 6, 2023, he was placed on injured reserve.

He played in all 17 regular season games (with 14 starts) and recorded 71 tackles, seven pass deflections, one forced fumble, and one fumble recovery.

=== Los Angeles Chargers ===
On March 12, 2025, St-Juste signed a one-year contract with the Los Angeles Chargers.

On October 12, 2025, Benjamin recorded his first interception as a Charger in a 29–27 win against the Miami Dolphins.

Benjamin St-Juste appeared in 16 games for the Los Angeles Chargers in 2025, making two starts while recording seven pass deflections and one interception.

According to Pro Football Focus (PFF), he finished the season as the NFL’s highest-graded cornerback in zone coverage (90.1), while also posting strong marks in overall coverage (77.1) and total defense (76.3). He missed just one tackle all year and contributed heavily on special teams with a career-high 296 snaps, capping off an impressive and efficient campaign.

=== Green Bay Packers ===
On March 12, 2026, St-Juste signed a two-year, $10 million contract with the Green Bay Packers.

== NFL career statistics ==
Legend
**Bold**	Career high

=== Regular season ===
Year	Team	Games		Tackles					Interceptions						Fumbles				
Year	Team	GP	GS	Cmb	Solo	Ast	Sck	TFL	Int	Yds	Avg	Lng	TD	PD	FF	Fum	FR	Yds	TD
2021	WAS	9	3	26	20	6	0.0	1	0	0	0.0	0	0	3	0	0	0	0	0
2022	WAS	12	12	42	34	8	**2.0**	**2**	0	0	0.0	0	0	7	1	0	0	0	0
2023	WAS	16	**16**	67	52	**15**	1.0	1	**1**	0	0.0	0	0	**17**	**2**	0	0	0	0
2024	WAS	**17**	14	**71**	**56**	**15**	0.0	0	0	0	0.0	0	0	7	1	0	**1**	0	0
2025	LAC	16	2	37	22	**15**	0.0	0	**1**	0	0.0	0	0	7	0	0	0	0	0
Career		70	47	243	184	59	3.0	4	2	0	0.0	0	0	41	4	0	1	0	0

=== Postseason ===
Year	Team	Games		Tackles					Interceptions						Fumbles				
Year	Team	GP	GS	Cmb	Solo	Ast	Sck	TFL	Int	Yds	Avg	Lng	TD	PD	FF	Fum	FR	Yds	TD
2024	WAS	**3**	0	**2**	**2**	0	0.0	0	0	0	0.0	0	0	0	0	0	0	0	0
2025	LAC	1	0	1	0	**1**	0.0	0	0	0	0.0	0	0	0	0	0	0	0	0
Career		4	0	3	2	1	0.0	0	0	0	0.0	0	0	0	0	0	0	0	0
