= Alaric Jackson =

Canadian-American football player (born 1998)

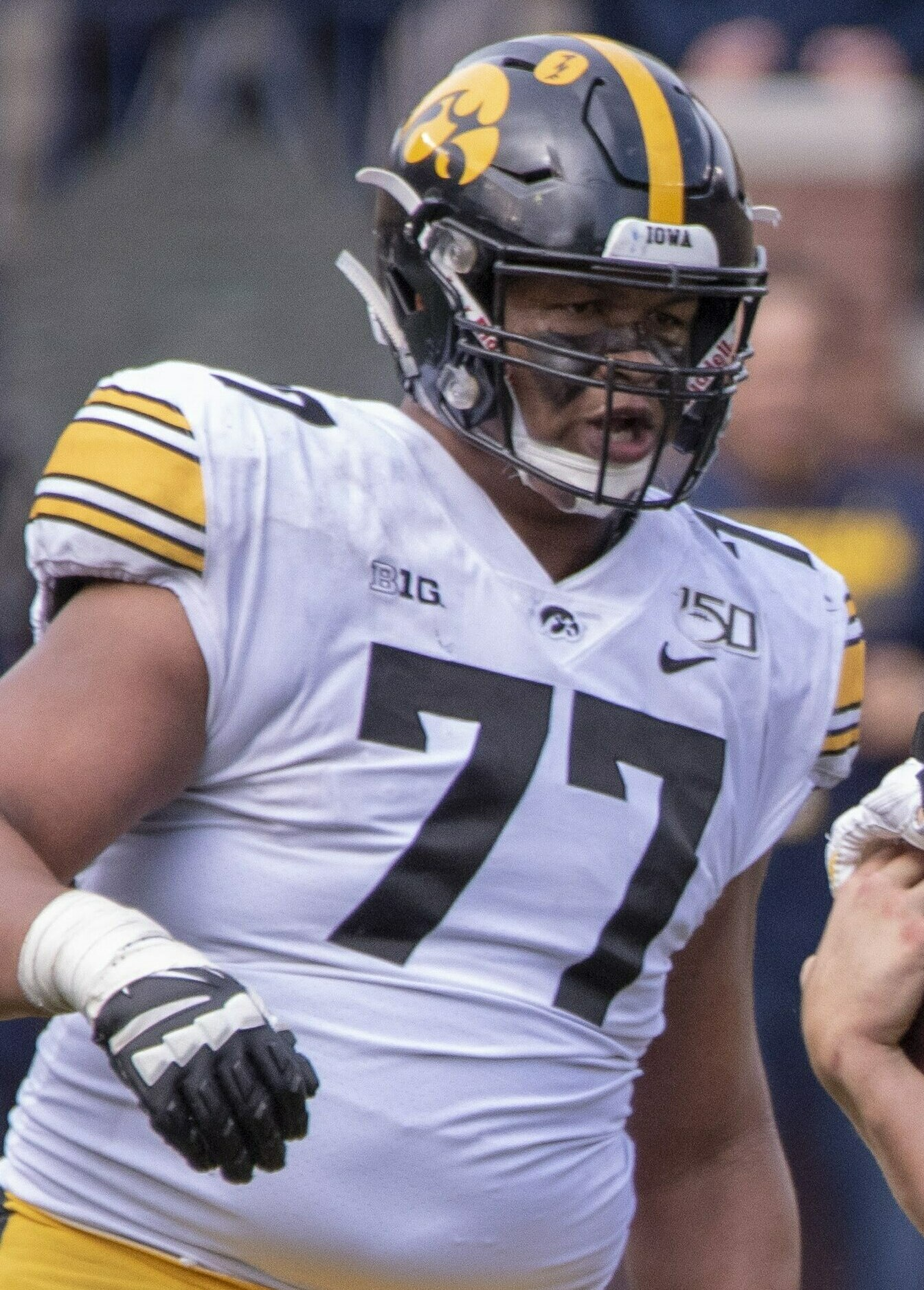
- Jackson with the Iowa Hawkeyes in 2019

No. 77 – Los Angeles Rams
- Position: Offensive tackle
- Roster status: Active

Personal information
- Born: July 14, 1998 (age 28); Windsor, Ontario, Canada
- Listed height: 6 ft 7 in (2.01 m)
- Listed weight: 338 lb (153 kg)

Career information
- High school: Renaissance (Detroit, Michigan, U.S.)
- College: Iowa (2016–2020)
- NFL draft: 2021: undrafted
- CFL draft: 2021: 2nd round, 15th overall pick

Career history
- Los Angeles Rams (2021–present)

Awards and highlights
- Super Bowl champion (LVI); AFCA Second-team All-American (2020); First-team All-Big Ten (2020); Second-team All-Big Ten (2018); Third-team All-Big Ten (2019)

Career NFL statistics as of Week 1, 2026
- Games played: 58
- Games started: 52
- Stats at Pro Football Reference

Alaric Jackson (born July 14, 1998) is a Canadian and American professional football offensive tackle for the Los Angeles Rams of the National Football League (NFL). He played college football for the Iowa Hawkeyes.

== Early life ==
Jackson was born in Windsor, Ontario and spent summers in Detroit, Michigan near the areas of West Seven Mile and Schafer with his father, Al Sr., before moving to Detroit, Michigan, and holds dual Canadian-American citizenship. He attended Renaissance High School, where he originally played basketball and did not start playing football until his junior year. Jackson committed to play college football at Iowa over offers from Iowa State, Nebraska, and Michigan State.

== College career ==
Jackson redshirted his true freshman season. He started every regular season game for Iowa at left tackle during his redshirt freshman season and was named to the Big Ten Conference All-Freshman team and a freshman All-American by the Football Writers Association of America. Jackson missed the season opener of his sophomore season after being suspended for violating team rules, but started the final 12 games of the season and was named second-team All-Big Ten. He missed three games due to injury as a redshirt junior and was named third-team All-Big Ten at the end of the season. As a redshirt senior, Jackson was named first-team All-Big Ten and a second-team All-American by the American Football Coaches Association after starting all eight of Iowa's games in the team's COVID-19-shortened 2020 season.

== Professional career ==
Pre-draft measurables
Height	Weight	Arm length	Hand span	Wingspan	40-yard dash	10-yard split	20-yard split	20-yard shuttle	Three-cone drill	Vertical jump	Broad jump	Bench press
6 ft 5 1/2 in (1.97 m)	321 lb (146 kg)	33 7/8 in (0.86 m)	9 1/4 in (0.23 m)	6 ft 10 3/8 in (2.09 m)	5.40 s	1.87 s	3.14 s	4.92 s	7.69 s	25.0 in (0.64 m)	8 ft 7 in (2.62 m)	20 reps
All values from Pro Day

Jackson signed with the Los Angeles Rams as an undrafted free agent on May 3, 2021. He made the Rams' 53-man roster out of training camp. Jackson made his NFL debut on October 31, 2021, playing nine snaps on offense in the fourth quarter of a 38–22 win over the Houston Texans. Jackson won Super Bowl LVI when the Rams defeated the Cincinnati Bengals 23–20.

Jackson entered the 2022 season as a backup offensive lineman. He was named the starting right guard in Week 3 for four games, then moved to left tackle for two games due to injuries. He was diagnosed with blood clots and was placed on season-ending injured reserve on November 16, 2022.

Jackson was suspended the first two games of the 2024 season for violating the league's personal conduct policy.

On February 28, 2025, Jackson and the Rams agreed on a three-year, $57 million contract extension.

On October 12, 2026, Jackson was spotted throwing a punch against Buffalo Bills linebacker Bradley Chubb after the game ended. The next day, the NFL suspended Jackson two games. Jackson appealed, and his suspension was reduced to one game.

== Legal issues ==
In November 2025, Jackson was named in a civil lawsuit filed in Los Angeles Superior Court by a woman who alleged he recorded her without her consent during sex and refused to delete the video despite her requests. The plaintiff claimed Jackson recorded her without her consent in May 2024, reported the incident to the NFL, and that the league subsequently suspended him for two games under its personal conduct policy for an undisclosed violation later linked to the suit’s allegations. Jackson and his representatives have declined detailed public comment due to ongoing legal proceedings. The lawsuit would eventually be moved to federal court, where it was dismissed on April 10, 2026.

On June 8, 2026, Jackson was arrested on suspicion of felony domestic battery. On June 9, he would be booked after being charged with felony domestic violence, and was the same day released on a $50,000 bond.

== Personal life ==
He has one child with Elizabeth James.
