= Frank Stojack =

American politician

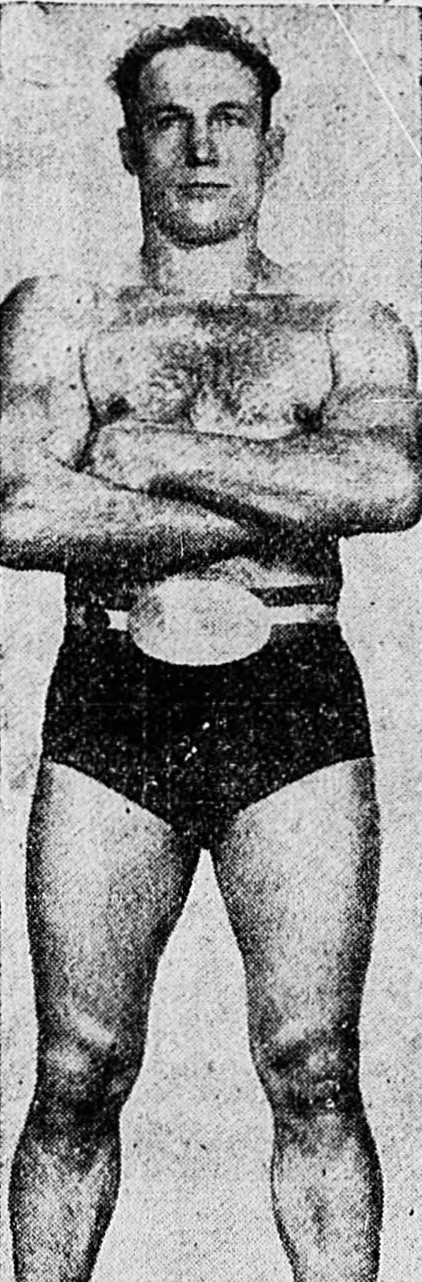
- Stojack as a wrestler

No. 19
- Position: Guard

Personal information
- Born: February 11, 1912; Wycliffe, British Columbia, Canada
- Died: August 30, 1987 (aged 75); Tacoma, Washington, U.S.
- Listed height: 5 ft 10 in (1.78 m)
- Listed weight: 194 lb (88 kg)

Career information
- High school: Lincoln (Tacoma, WA)
- College: Washington State

Career history
- Brooklyn Dodgers (1935–1936)

Career statistics
- Games played: 23
- Starts: 7
- Stats at Pro Football Reference

Frank Nickolas "Toughie" Stojack (February 11, 1912 – August 30, 1987) was a Canadian-born National Football League (NFL) player and professional wrestler. He moved to Tacoma, Washington, as a child, and considered that his home town.

== Biography ==
=== Football career ===
Stojack as a rookie with the Brooklyn Dodgers of the NFL in 1935.

After graduating from Washington State, Stojack signed with the Brooklyn Dodgers of the National Football League, for whom he played guard for two seasons, 1935 and 1936. He also played in the CFL and in 1940 for the Boeing Aero Mechanics semi pro football team. During the course of his playing career he earned the nickname "Toughie" for never having been injured on the field.

=== Wrestling career ===
Stojack became a professional wrestler early in 1935. His signature move was the airplane spin. In 1947 he won the first of four Pacific Coast Junior Heavyweight Championships. In the 1950s he was the light heavyweight champion of the world, defeating Gypsy Joe in Spokane, Washington, on April 10, 1953, and holding it until November 30, 1957, when he was stripped of the belt by the NWA. He continued to defend the belt for another year.

=== Political career ===
He was elected to the Tacoma City Council in 1953, but continued to wrestle even after his election. At the end of his term on the Tacoma City Council, he ran for, and was elected, Pierce County Sheriff. He served as sheriff until 1962.

=== Death and legacy ===
Stojack died on August 30, 1987, from Alzheimer's disease. He was 75 years old at the time of his death. When he died, he left over $300,000 from his estate to the Boys & Girls Clubs of America.

During his time in Pacific Northwest Wrestling Stojack held the NWA World Light Heavyweight Championship title 1 time.

== See also ==
- List of gridiron football players who became professional wrestlers
