= Deane Leonard =

Canadian gridiron football player (born 1999)

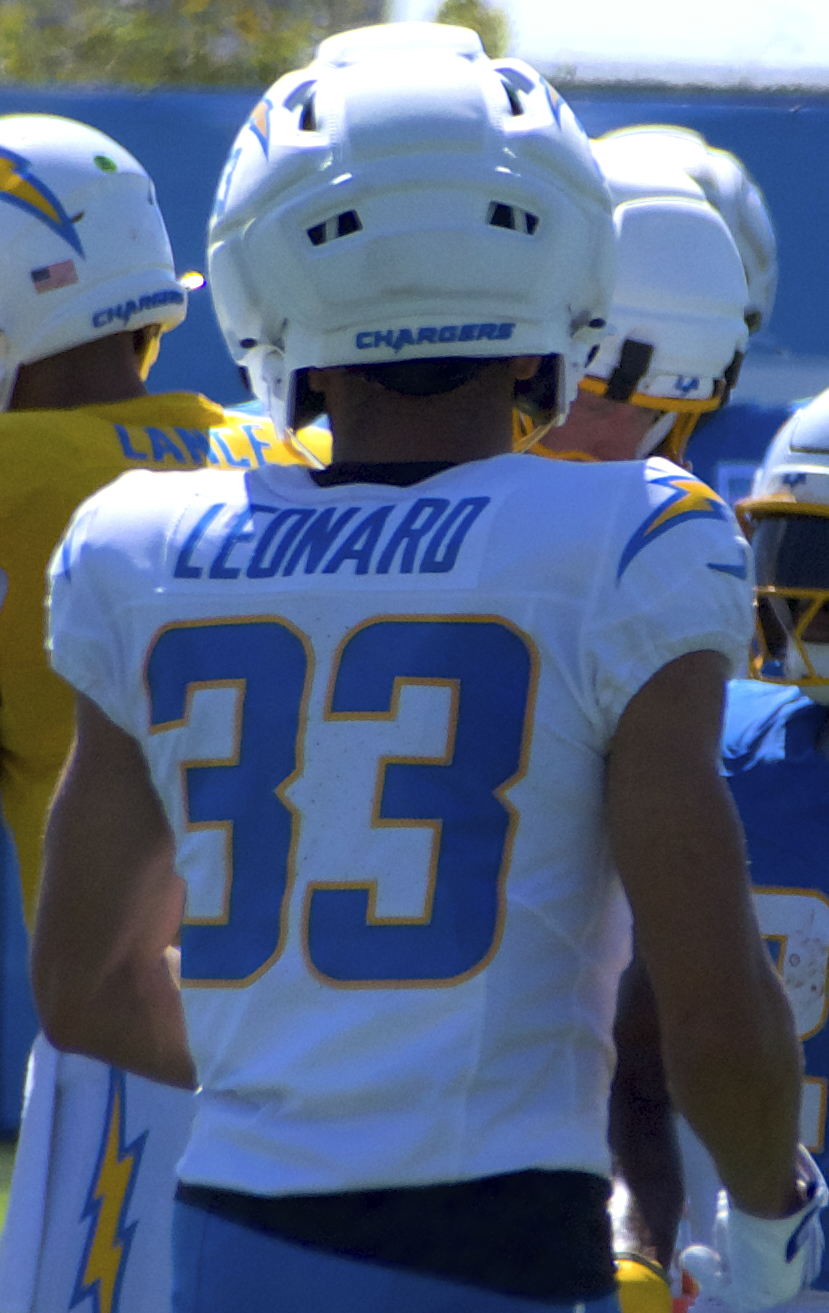
- Leonard with the Los Angeles Chargers in 2026

No. 33 – Los Angeles Chargers
- Position: Cornerback
- Roster status: Active

Personal information
- Born: November 20, 1999 (age 26); Calgary, Alberta, Canada
- Listed height: 6 ft 0 in (1.83 m)
- Listed weight: 195 lb (88 kg)

Career information
- High school: Notre Dame (Calgary)
- College: Ole Miss (2020–2021)
- University: Calgary (2017–2019)
- NFL draft: 2022: 7th round, 236th overall pick
- CFL draft: 2021: 2nd round, 18th overall pick

Career history
- Los Angeles Chargers (2022–present)

Awards and highlights
- Vanier Cup champion (2019)

Career NFL statistics as of Week 5, 2026
- Total tackles: 55
- Forced fumbles: 2
- Fumble recoveries: 1
- Pass deflections: 6
- Stats at Pro Football Reference

Deane Joseph Leonard (born November 20, 1999) is a Canadian professional football cornerback for the Los Angeles Chargers in the National Football League (NFL). He played college football for the Calgary Dinos before transferring to the Ole Miss Rebels.

== Professional career ==
Pre-draft measurables
Height	Weight	Arm length	Hand span	Wingspan	40-yard dash	10-yard split	20-yard split	20-yard shuttle	Three-cone drill	Vertical jump	Broad jump	Bench press
6 ft 0 5/8 in (1.84 m)	194 lb (88 kg)	30 1/2 in (0.77 m)	8 1/4 in (0.21 m)	6 ft 2 3/4 in (1.90 m)	4.39 s	1.51 s	2.55 s	4.25 s	7.15 s	33.0 in (0.84 m)	9 ft 11 in (3.02 m)	14 reps
All values from Pro Day

Leonard was selected in the seventh round (236th overall) in the 2022 NFL draft by the Los Angeles Chargers. He was also previously drafted in the second round (18th overall) in the 2021 CFL draft by the Hamilton Tiger-Cats. As a rookie, he appeared in all 17 games, mainly in a special teams role. In the 2023 season, his role on the defense expanded. He finished with 28 total tackles (22 solo), three passes defended, and one forced fumble in 11 games and three starts. In the 2024 season, he appeared in ten games, contributing on defense and special teams.

On August 26, 2025, Leonard was placed on injured reserve due to a leg injury, requiring him to miss at least the first four games of the season. He was activated on November 8, ahead of the team's Week 10 matchup against the Pittsburgh Steelers.

On March 11, 2026, Leonard re-signed with the Chargers on a one-year, $2 million contract.
