= 2022 Edmonton Elks season =

CFL team season

- General manager: Chris Jones
- President: Victor Cui
- Head coach: Chris Jones
- Home stadium: Commonwealth Stadium

Results
- Record: 4–14
- Division place: 5th, West
- Playoffs: Did not qualify
- Team MOP: Kenny Lawler
- Team MODP: Jake Ceresna
- Team MOC: Adam Konar
- Team MOOL: Mark Korte
- Team MOST: Christian Saulsberry
- Team MOR: Kevin Brown

Uniform
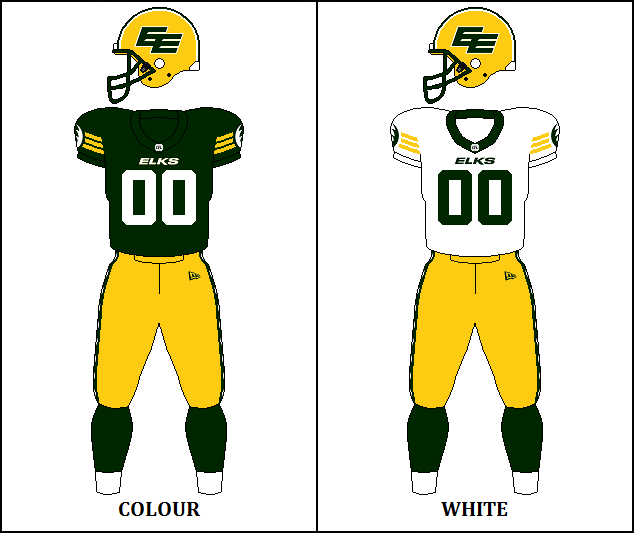

The 2022 Edmonton Elks season was the 64th season for the team in the Canadian Football League (CFL) and their 73rd overall. The Elks improved upon their league-worst 3–11 record from 2021, but were eliminated from playoff qualification on October 8 following a loss to the Winnipeg Blue Bombers. The Elks set a dubious record for most consecutive home losses when they lost for the 15th straight time at home on October 1, surpassing the Ottawa Rough Riders and their 17 game home losing streak from 1987 to 1988. The team finished winless at home for the second straight season and extended their CFL record to 17 consecutive home losses.

The team's 2022 season was the first under general manager Chris Jones. It was also the third season overall for Edmonton with Jones as head coach, with Jones having coached the team to its most recent title in 2015. The team's previous head coach, general manager, and president, Jaime Elizondo, Brock Sunderland, and Chris Presson, respectively, were fired following the 2021 season.

The club discontinued the use of the antler helmet logo it adopted the previous season alongside its name change to Elks, and replaced it with a version of the traditional "EE" logo it used while playing under its former nickname, the Eskimos.

== Offseason ==
=== CFL global draft ===
The 2022 CFL global draft took place on May 3. The Elks had three selections in the snake draft.

Round	Pick	Player	Position	University/Club Team	Nationality
1	9	Ben Griffiths	P	Southern California	Australia
2	17	Rafael Gaglianone	K	Wisconsin	Brazil
3	20	Corliss Waitman	P	South Alabama	Belgium

== CFL national draft ==
The 2022 CFL draft took place on May 3. The Elks had the first overall pick, but traded down to the fourth selection following a trade with the Montreal Alouettes for the playing rights for Carter O'Donnell. The team acquired additional first and third round selections after trading Kyle Saxelid and Grant McDonald to the Hamilton Tiger-Cats. The Elks also traded a second-round pick to the Toronto Argonauts in exchange for Nick Arbuckle. The team had ten selections in the eight-round draft due to being awarded a territorial selection in the second round.

Round	Pick	Player	Position	University team	Hometown
1	4	Enock Makonzo	DB	Coastal Carolina	Lachine, QC
1	8	Tre Ford	QB	Waterloo	Niagara Falls, ON
2	19T	Jacob Plamondon	DL	Calgary	Red Deer, AB
3	21	Marc-David Bien-Aime	OL	Fresno State	Montreal, QC
3	28	Peter Adjey	LS	Queen's	Toronto, ON
4	30	Gavin Cobb	WR	Manitoba	Victoria, BC
5	39	Wesly Appolon	LB	Tuskegee	Montreal, QC
6	48	Jeremie Dominique	DB	Charleston	Montreal, QC
7	57	Jean-Paul Cimankinda	RB	Ottawa	Ottawa, ON
8	66	Nate Edwards	LB	McMaster	Ancaster, ON

== Preseason ==
Week	Game	Date	Kickoff	Opponent	Results		TV	Venue	Attendance	Summary
Week	Game	Date	Kickoff	Opponent	Score	Record	TV	Venue	Attendance	Summary
A	1	Fri, May 27	6:30 p.m. MDT	at Winnipeg Blue Bombers	W 30–20	1–0	None	IG Field	20,518	Recap
B	2	Fri, Jun 3	7:00 p.m. MDT	vs. Calgary Stampeders	L 7–37	1–1	None	Commonwealth Stadium	N/A	Recap

== Regular season ==
=== Season standings ===
West Division
Team	GP	W	L	T	Pts	PF	PA	Div	Stk	
Winnipeg Blue Bombers	18	15	3	0	30	538	370	10–1	W1	Details
BC Lions	18	12	6	0	24	525	405	8–4	L1	Details
Calgary Stampeders	18	12	6	0	24	533	373	7–5	W2	Details
Saskatchewan Roughriders	18	6	12	0	12	370	440	3–8	L7	Details
Edmonton Elks	18	4	14	0	8	354	599	1–11	L4	Details

=== Season schedule ===
Week	Game	Date	Kickoff	Opponent	Results		TV	Venue	Attendance	Summary
Week	Game	Date	Kickoff	Opponent	Score	Record	TV	Venue	Attendance	Summary
1	1	Sat, June 11	8:00 p.m. MDT	at BC Lions	L 15–59	0–1	TSN	BC Place	34,082	Recap
2	2	Sat, June 18	7:30 p.m. MDT	vs. Saskatchewan Roughriders	L 16–26	0–2	TSN/ESPNews	Commonwealth Stadium	23,121	Recap
3	3	Sat, June 25	5:00 p.m. MDT	at Calgary Stampeders	L 23–30	0–3	TSN	McMahon Stadium	22,739	Recap
4	4	Fri, July 1	5:30 p.m. MDT	at Hamilton Tiger-Cats	W 29–25	1–3	TSN	Tim Hortons Field	20,233	Recap
5	5	Thu, July 7	7:00 p.m. MDT	vs. Calgary Stampeders	L 6–49	1–4	TSN/RDS	Commonwealth Stadium	21,023	Recap
6	6	Thu, July 14	5:30 p.m. MDT	at Montreal Alouettes	W 32–31	2–4	TSN/RDS/ESPN2	Molson Stadium	16,128	Recap
7	7	Fri, July 22	7:00 p.m. MDT	vs. Winnipeg Blue Bombers	L 24–10	2–5	TSN/ESPN2	Commonwealth Stadium	22,716	Recap
8	Bye									
9	8	Sat, Aug 6	8:00 p.m. MDT	at BC Lions	L 14–46	2–6	TSN/ESPN2	BC Place	16,342	Recap
10	9	Sat, Aug 13	8:00 p.m. MDT	vs. Saskatchewan Roughriders	L 23–34	2–7	TSN	Commonwealth Stadium	25,351	Recap
11	10	Fri, Aug 19	5:00 p.m. MDT	at Ottawa Redblacks	W 30–12	3–7	TSN/RDS2	TD Place Stadium	19,382	Recap
12	11	Sat, Aug 27	5:00 p.m. MDT	vs. Ottawa Redblacks	L 18–25	3–8	TSN/RDS	Commonwealth Stadium	21,787	Recap
13	12	Mon, Sept 5	2:30 p.m. MDT	at Calgary Stampeders	L 18–26	3–9	TSN	McMahon Stadium	30,479	Recap
14	13	Sat, Sept 10	6:00 p.m. MDT	vs. Calgary Stampeders	L 28–56	3–10	TSN/RDS2	Commonwealth Stadium	26,946	Recap
15	14	Fri, Sept 16	7:30 p.m. MDT	at Saskatchewan Roughriders	W 26–24	4–10	TSN	Mosaic Stadium	27,000	Recap
16	Bye									
17	15	Sat, Oct 1	2:00 p.m. MDT	vs. Montreal Alouettes	L 18–25	4–11	TSN/RDS	Commonwealth Stadium	24,201	Recap
18	16	Sat, Oct 8	5:00 p.m. MDT	at Winnipeg Blue Bombers	L 11–48	4–12	TSN/RDS	IG Field	27,159	Recap
19	17	Sat, Oct 15	5:00 p.m. MDT	vs. Toronto Argonauts	L 23–28	4–13	TSN	Commonwealth Stadium	25,723	Recap
20	18	Fri, Oct 21	7:30 p.m. MDT	vs. BC Lions	L 14–31	4–14	TSN	Commonwealth Stadium	23,212	Recap
21	Bye									

== Roster ==
2022 Edmonton Elks final roster
**Quarterbacks**: 35 Michael Beaudry; 2 Tre Ford; **Running backs**: 4 Kevin Brown; 27 Tanner Green; 34 Ante Milanovic-Litre; **Receivers**: 84 Emmanuel Arceneaux; 81 Nih-Jer Jackson; 10 Kai Locksley QB; 17 Dillon Mitchell; 80 Llevi Noel; 18 Chris Osei-Kusi; 25 Christian Saulsberry; 83 Danny Vandervoort; 87 Derel Walker	**Offensive linemen**: 68 David Foucault G/T; 60 Andrew Garnett T; 67 Jesse Gibbon G; 63 Jaylan Guthrie G; 64 Tomas Jack-Kurdyla G; 65 Mark Korte C/G; 61 Steven Nielsen T; **Defensive linemen**: 94 Jake Ceresna DT; 95 Avery Ellis DE; 74 Makana Henry DT; 92 Ese Mrabure DE; 96 J-Min Pelley DT; 99 Christian Rector DT; 19 Matthew Thomas DE	**Linebackers**: 29 Mike Dubuisson; 39 Tony Jones; 38 Adam Konar; 40 Deon Lacey; 13 Jordan Reaves; 31 Malik Tyne; **Defensive backs**: 37 Treston Decoud; 23 Jeremie Dominique; 6 Ed Gainey; 28 Jamie Harry; 20 Scott Hutter; 43 Enock Makonzo; 5 Donovan Olumba; 24 Jeff Richards	**Special teams**: 47 Peter Adjey LS; 14 Sergio Castillo K; 12 Jon Ryan P; **Practice roster**: 26 Rafael Gaglianone K; 75 Malik Harris DE; 16 Greg Hutchins K; 88 Lucky Jackson WR; 9 Raphael Leonard DB; 41 Ryan Meskell K; 55 Cole Nelson T; 3 Rashaun Simonise WR; 56 Samuel Thomassin G; **Suspended list**: Curtis Akins LB; Derrick Baity DB; Marc-David Bien-Aime G; Nicholas Summach T; Wihan van der Riet K; Michael Walker WR	**Injured list**: 0 Tobi Antigha LB; 48 Wesly Appolon LB; 50 Tim Bonner DE; 8 Duron Carter DB; 85 Gavin Cobb WR; 15 Taylor Cornelius QB; 90 Kony Ealy DT; 82 Vincent Forbes-Mombleau WR; 36 Aaron Grymes DB; 62 Martez Ivey T; 89 Kenny Lawler WR; 77 Keisean Lucier-South DE; 7 Jalin Marshall WR; 49 Mark McLaurin DB; 45 Nyles Morgan LB; 91 Jacob Plamondon DE; 93 Daniel Ross DT; 42 Brady Sheldon LB; 58 Tony Washington T; 7 Tre Watson LB; 32 James Wilder Jr. RB
Italics indicate American player • **Bold** indicates Global player

== Coaching staff ==
Edmonton Elks staff
Front office: President and ceo – Victor Cui; General manager – Chris Jones; Assistant general manager – Geroy Simon; Assistant general manager – Bobby Merritt; Director of football operations – Kris Hagerman; Director of us scouting – Sammy Gahagan; Assistant director of football operations – Nick Pelletier; Head video coordinator – Mike Woytowich; Head coach: Head coach – Chris Jones; Offensive coaches: Offensive coordinator – Stephen McAdoo; Pass game coordinator and quarterbacks – Jarious Jackson; Run game coordinator and receivers – Markus Howell; Offensive line – Anthony Vitale	Defensive coaches: Defensive coordinator – Chris Jones; Defensive line – Demetrious Maxie; Linebackers – Cam Robinson; Defensive backs – Brandon Isaac; Special teams coaches: Special teams coordinator – Merritt Bowden; Special teams assistant – Mike Scheper; Strength and conditioning: Strength and conditioning coach – Tyrone Robinson; → Coaching staff
