= 2023 Edmonton Elks season =

CFL team season

- General manager: Chris Jones
- President: Victor Cui; Rick LeLacheur (interim)
- Head coach: Chris Jones
- Home stadium: Commonwealth Stadium

Results
- Record: 4–14
- Division place: 5th, West
- Playoffs: Did not qualify
- Team MOP: Tre Ford
- Team MODP: Jake Ceresna
- Team MOC: Tre Ford
- Team MOOL: Martez Ivey
- Team MOST: Scott Hutter
- Team MOR: Kai Gray

Uniform
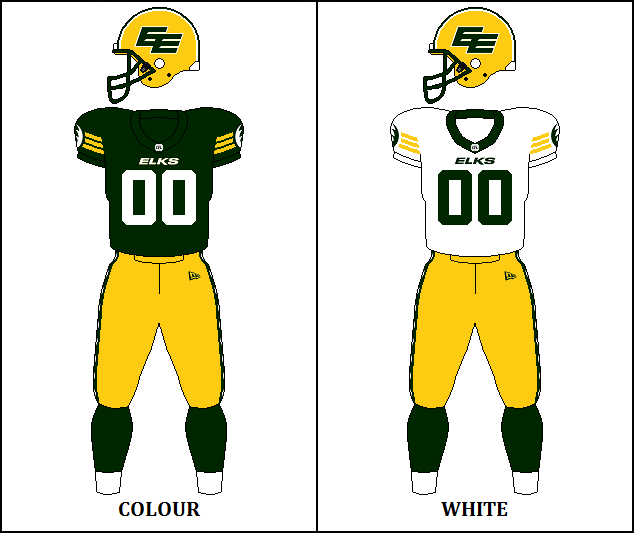

The 2023 Edmonton Elks season was the 65th season for the team in the Canadian Football League (CFL) and their 74th overall. After an 0–9 start to the season, the Elks were mathematically eliminated from playoff contention following their week 18 loss to the Toronto Argonauts.

The team's 2023 season was the second under the second tenure of head coach and general manager, Chris Jones.

The Elks struggled on the field and started the season 0–7 for the first time in franchise history. The only other Edmonton-based senior football team to start a season 0–7 was the 1938 Edmonton Eskimos who went winless in the then-eight-game Western Interprovincial Football Union season. The Elks also set the record for the longest home losing streak in North American professional sports, previously held by the 1953 St. Louis Browns, having lost 21 consecutive games at Commonwealth Stadium in a slump dating to the 2019 season. They also matched a team record for consecutive losses both home and away, at 13, which ended with a week 11 win in Hamilton. After 1,415 days, the team won a home game on August 27 against the Ottawa Redblacks, ending the home-losing streak at 22 games.

== Offseason ==
=== CFL global draft ===
The 2023 CFL global draft took place on May 2. The Elks had the second selection in each round.

Round	Pick	Player	Position	Club/School	Nationality
1	2	Dean Faithfull	K	Colorado State-Pueblo	(United Kingdom) Great Britain
2	11	Kilian Zierer	OL	Auburn	Germany

== CFL national draft ==
The 2023 CFL draft took place on May 2. The Elks had nine selections in the eight-round draft, including a territorial selection. The team acquired additional selections in the second and third rounds, but also forfeited a second-round pick after drafting J-Min Pelley in the 2022 Supplemental Draft.

Round	Pick	Player	Position	University team	Hometown
1	2	Michael Brodrique	LB	Montreal	Sainte-Marthe-sur-le-Lac, QC
2	18T	Jacob Taylor	LB	Alberta	Beaumont, AB
3	20	Phillip Grohovac	OL	Western Ontario	Victoria, BC
3	23	Luke Burton-Krahn	DB	British Columbia	Victoria, BC
4	28	Noah Curtis	DL	Keiser	West Palm Beach, FL
5	38	Bertrand Beaulieu	RB	Montreal	Châteauguay, QC
6	50	Spencer Masterson	OL	Guelph	Richmond Hill, ON
7	56	Bruno Legace	DE	Montreal	Montreal, QC
8	65	Derek Best	RB	Western Ontario	Surrey, BC

== Preseason ==
Week	Game	Date	Kickoff	Opponent	Results		TV	Venue	Attendance	Summary
Week	Game	Date	Kickoff	Opponent	Score	Record	TV	Venue	Attendance	Summary
A	1	Mon, May 22	2:00 p.m. MDT	at Calgary Stampeders	L 24–29	0–1	None	McMahon Stadium	17,942	Recap
B	2	Sat, May 27	2:00 p.m. MDT	vs. Winnipeg Blue Bombers	L 23–25	0–2	None	Commonwealth Stadium	N/A	Recap
C	Bye									

== Regular season ==
=== Standings ===
West Division
Team	GP	W	L	T	Pts	PF	PA	Div	Stk	
Winnipeg Blue Bombers	18	14	4	0	28	594	377	10–2	W4	Details
BC Lions	18	12	6	0	24	495	439	8–4	L1	Details
Calgary Stampeders	18	6	12	0	12	412	471	4–7	L1	Details
Saskatchewan Roughriders	18	6	12	0	12	387	551	5–7	L7	Details
Edmonton Elks	18	4	14	0	8	367	517	2–9	L4	Details

=== Schedule ===
Week	Game	Date	Kickoff	Opponent	Results		TV	Venue	Attendance	Summary
Week	Game	Date	Kickoff	Opponent	Score	Record	TV	Venue	Attendance	Summary
1	1	Sun, June 11	5:00 p.m. MDT	vs. Saskatchewan Roughriders	L 13–17	0–1	TSN	Commonwealth Stadium	32,233	Recap
2	2	Sat, June 17	5:00 p.m. MDT	at BC Lions	L 0–22	0–2	TSN/CBSSN	BC Place	33,103	Recap
3	3	Sun, June 25	5:00 p.m. MDT	vs. Toronto Argonauts	L 31–43	0–3	TSN	Commonwealth Stadium	20,817	Recap
4	4	Fri, June 30	5:30 p.m. MDT	at Ottawa Redblacks	L 7–26	0–4	TSN/RDS	TD Place Stadium	18,145	Recap
5	5	Thu, July 6	7:00 p.m. MDT	at Saskatchewan Roughriders	L 11–12	0–5	TSN/CBSSN	Mosaic Stadium	27,197	Recap
6	6	Thu, July 13	7:00 p.m. MDT	vs. Hamilton Tiger-Cats	L 29–37	0–6	TSN/CBSSN	Commonwealth Stadium	21,173	Recap
7	7	Thu, July 20	6:30 p.m. MDT	at Winnipeg Blue Bombers	L 14–28	0–7	TSN	IG Field	28,512	Recap
8	8	Sat, July 29	5:00 p.m. MDT	vs. BC Lions	L 0–27	0–8	TSN/CBSSN	Commonwealth Stadium	24,613	Recap
9	Bye									
10	9	Thu, Aug 10	7:00 p.m. MDT	vs. Winnipeg Blue Bombers	L 29–38	0–9	TSN/CBSSN	Commonwealth Stadium	19,921	Recap
11	10	Thu, Aug 17	5:30 p.m. MDT	at Hamilton Tiger-Cats	W 24–10	1–9	TSN/RDS2/CBSSN	Tim Hortons Field	20,912	Recap
12	11	Sun, Aug 27	5:00 p.m. MDT	vs. Ottawa Redblacks	W 30–20	2–9	TSN/RDS/CBSSN	Commonwealth Stadium	23,825	Recap
13	12	Mon, Sept 4	5:00 p.m. MDT	at Calgary Stampeders	L 31–35	2–10	TSN/CBSSN	McMahon Stadium	26,741	Recap
14	13	Sat, Sept 9	5:00 p.m. MDT	vs. Calgary Stampeders	W 25–23	3–10	TSN/RDS2	Commonwealth Stadium	32,422	Recap
15	14	Fri, Sept 15	7:30 p.m. MDT	at Saskatchewan Roughriders	W 36–27	4–10	TSN	Mosaic Stadium	25,304	Recap
16	15	Fri, Sept 22	7:30 p.m. MDT	vs. BC Lions	L 29–37	4–11	TSN	Commonwealth Stadium	25,144	Recap
17	Bye									
18	16	Fri, Oct 6	5:00 p.m. MDT	at Toronto Argonauts	L 12–35	4–12	TSN/RDS2/CBSSN	BMO Field	14,246	Recap
19	17	Sat, Oct 14	2:00 p.m. MDT	vs. Montreal Alouettes	L 21–35	4–13	TSN/RDS	Commonwealth Stadium	22,822	Recap
20	18	Sat, Oct 21	5:00 p.m. MDT	at Winnipeg Blue Bombers	L 25–45	4–14	TSN	IG Field	32,343	Recap
21	Bye									

== Roster ==
2023 Edmonton Elks final roster
**Quarterbacks**: 15 Taylor Cornelius; 12 Jarret Doege; 2 Tre Ford; **Running backs**: 22 Shannon Brooks; 4 Kevin Brown; 27 Tanner Green; **Receivers**: 81 Deontez Alexander; 84 Emmanuel Arceneaux; 85 Gavin Cobb; 82 Vincent Forbes-Mombleau; 87 Geno Lewis; 17 Dillon Mitchell; 3 Kyran Moore	**Offensive linemen**: 69 Brett Boyko T; 68 David Foucault G; 62 Martez Ivey T; 64 Tomas Jack-Kurdyla G; 65 Mark Korte C; 58 Josiah St. John T/G; **Defensive linemen**: 95 Sam Acheampong DT/DE; 41 Elliott Brown DE; 52 Luke Burton-Krahn DE; 94 Jake Ceresna DE/DT; 99 Olivier Charles-Pierre DT; 92 Noah Curtis DT; 6 A.C. Leonard DE; 91 Jacob Plamondon DE; 93 Daniel Ross DT	**Linebackers**: 44 Michael Brodrique; 39 Tony Jones; 38 Adam Konar; 45 Nyles Morgan; 13 Jordan Reaves; 40 Josiah Schakel; **Defensive backs**: 24 Darrius Bratton; 32 Marloshawn Franklin; 11 Ed Gainey; 29 Kai Gray; 20 Scott Hutter; 5 Donovan Olumba; 0 Loucheiz Purifoy; 13 Jake Taylor; **Special teams**: 47 Peter Adjey LS; 18 Dean Faithfull K; 9 Jake Julien P	**Practice roster**: 59 Phillip Grohovac C/G; **Injured list**: 48 Wesly Appolon LB; 33 Woodly Appolon LB; 23 Jeremie Dominique DB; 7 Steven Dunbar SB; 36 Aaron Grymes DB; 26 Marcus Lewis DB; 43 Enock Makonzo DB; 55 Cole Nelson DT; 96 J-Min Pelley DT; 63 Samuel Thomassin G; **Suspended list**: -- Toryque Bateman T; -- Marc-David Bien-Aime G; 90 Kony Ealy DE; -- Tony Gray T; -- Ye'Majesty Sanders T; -- Nicholas Summach T
Italics indicate American player • **Bold** indicates Global player

== Coaching staff ==
Edmonton Elks staff
Front Office: President and CEO – Rick LeLacheur (Interim); General Manager – Chris Jones; Assistant General Manager – Geroy Simon; Assistant General Manager – Bobby Merritt; Director of Football Operations – Kris Hagerman; Director of US Scouting – Sammy Gahagan; Assistant Director of Football Operations – Nick Pelletier; Head Video Coordinator – Mike Woytowich; Head Coach: Head Coach – Chris Jones; Offensive coaches: Offensive Coordinator and Quarterbacks – Jarious Jackson; Run Game Coordinator and Receivers – Markus Howell; Offensive Line – Stephen Sorrells; Running backs – Jordan Linnen	Defensive coaches: Defensive Coordinator – Chris Jones; Defensive Line – Demetrious Maxie; Linebackers – Cam Robinson; Defensive Backs – Brandon Isaac; Advisor – Stephen McAdoo; Special teams coach: Special Teams Coordinator - Mike Scheper; Special Teams Assistant - Michael Daniels; Strength and Conditioning: Strength and Conditioning Coach – Erin Craig; → Coaching staff
