= Noah Curtis =

Noah Curtis may refer to:

- Noah Curtis (Canadian football) (born 1998), American–Canadian gridiron football player
- Noah Curtis (film character), a character from the film 2012.
