= Jacob Plamondon =

Canadian gridiron football player (born 1998)

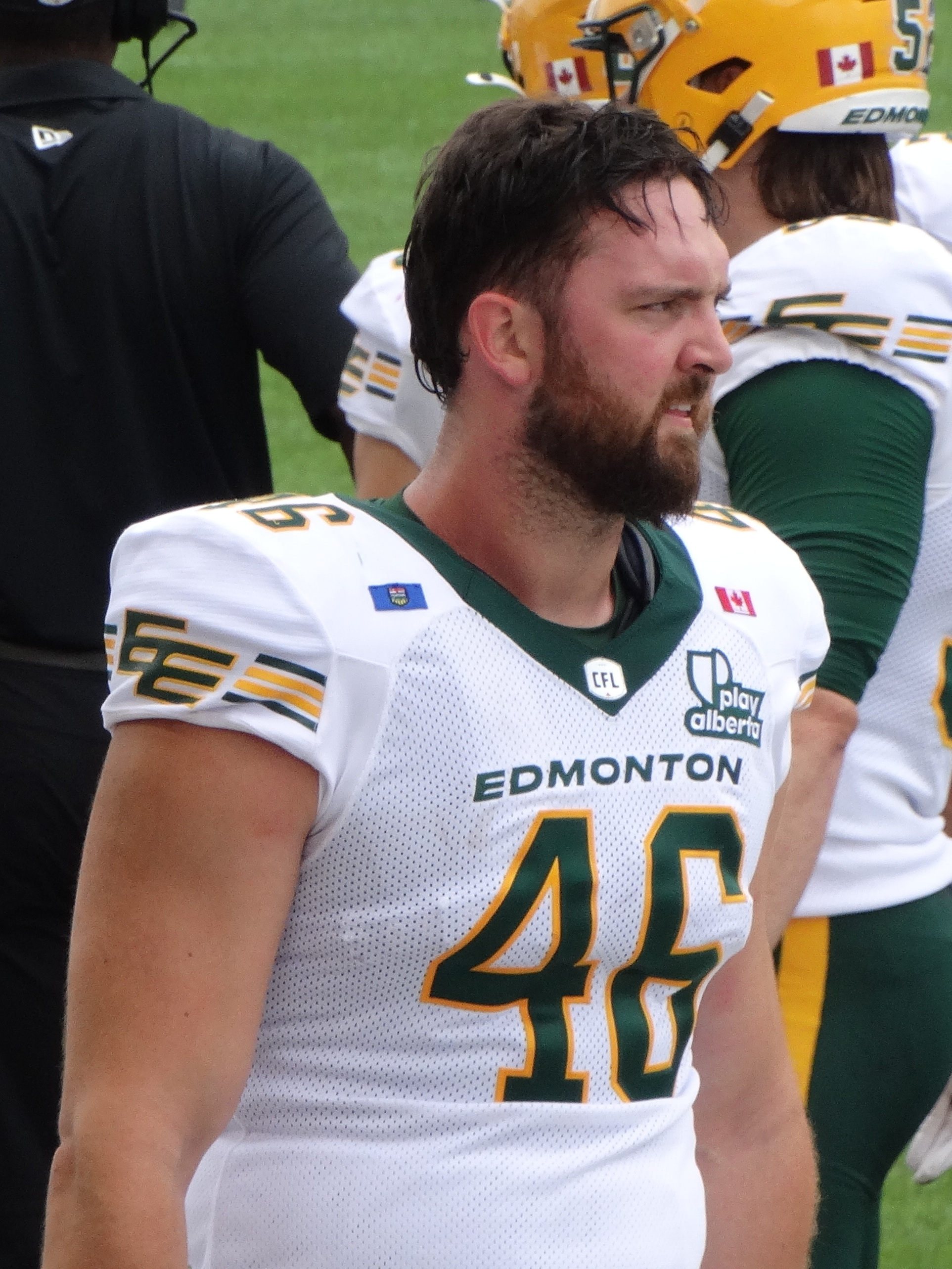
- Plamondon with the Edmonton Elks in 2025

No. 46 – Edmonton Elks
- Positions: Fullback, Defensive lineman
- Roster status: 6-game injured list
- CFL status: National

Personal information
- Born: November 6, 1998 (age 28); Red Deer, Alberta, Canada
- Listed height: 6 ft 3 in (1.91 m)
- Listed weight: 225 lb (102 kg)

Career information
- University: Calgary
- CFL draft: 2022: 2nd round, 19th overall pick

Career history
- 2022–present: Edmonton Elks

Awards and highlights
- Grey Cup champion (2026); Vanier Cup champion (2019)
- Stats at CFL.ca

Jacob Plamondon (born November 6, 1998) is a Canadian professional football fullback and defensive lineman for the Edmonton Elks of the Canadian Football League (CFL).

== University career ==
Plamondon played U Sports football for the Calgary Dinos from 2017 to 2021. He played in 27 games where he had 39 tackles and six sacks. In 2019, he was a member of the 55th Vanier Cup championship team.

== Professional career ==
Pre-draft measurables
| Height | Weight | 40-yard dash | 20-yard shuttle | Three-cone drill | Vertical jump | Broad jump | Bench press |
|---|---|---|---|---|---|---|---|
| 6 ft 3 1/8 in (1.91 m) | 238 lb (108 kg) | 4.93 s | 4.33 s | 6.98 s | 32.0 in (0.81 m) | 9 ft 9 in (2.97 m) | 13 reps |
All values from CFL Combine

Plamondon was drafted in the second round, 19th overall, by the Edmonton Elks in the 2022 CFL draft and signed with the team on May 11, 2022. He began the 2022 season on the suspended list, but made his debut in week 3 on June 25, 2022, against the Calgary Stampeders at McMahon Stadium, where he played for the Dinos. He played in 14 regular season games in his rookie year where he recorded two special teams tackles.

In 2023, Plamondon played in all 18 regular season games, where he had eight special teams tackles.
