= Cole Nelson =

Canadian gridiron football player (born 1997)

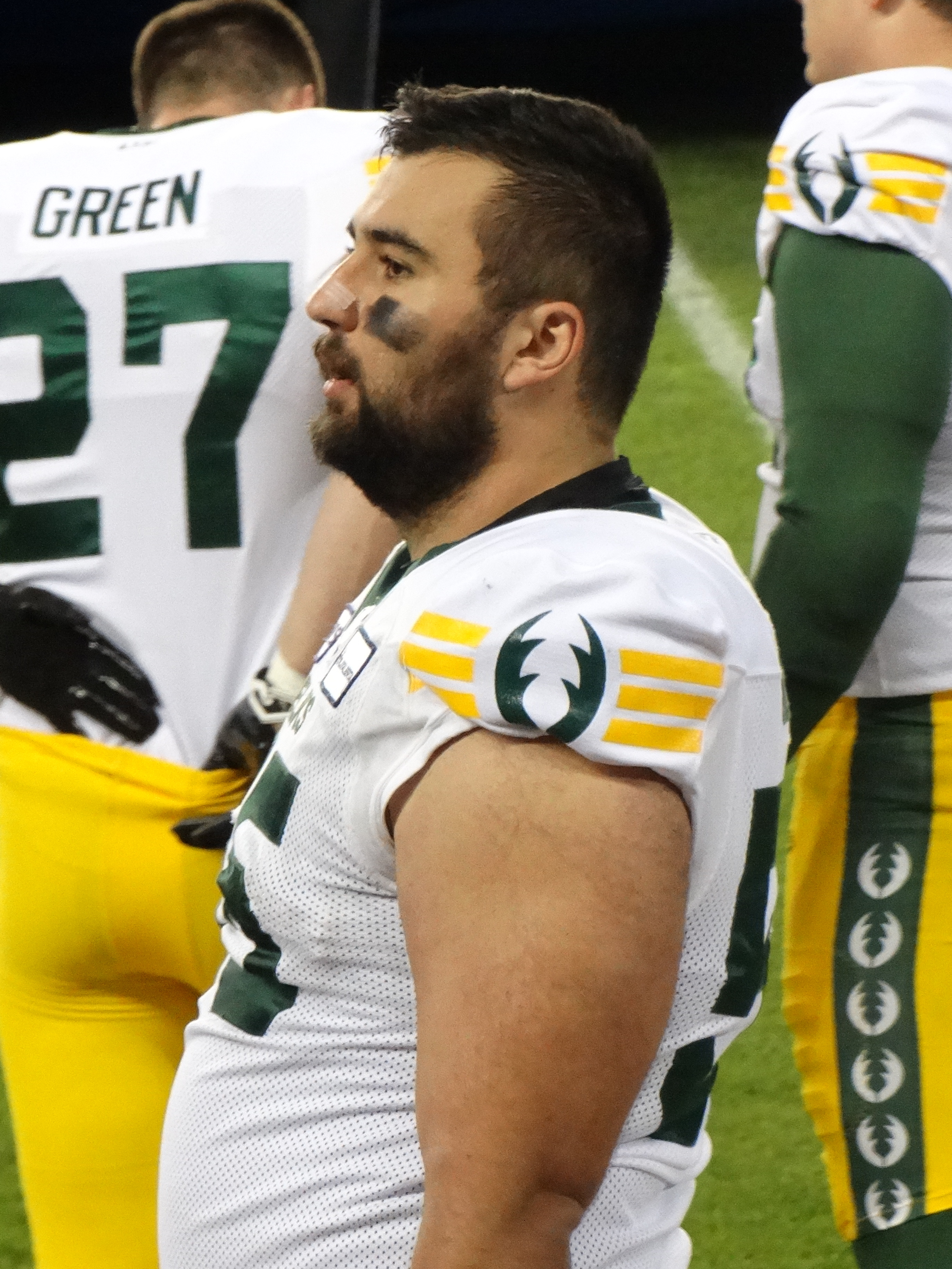
- Nelson with the Edmonton Elks in 2023

Profile
- Positions: Offensive lineman, defensive lineman

Personal information
- Born: March 12, 1997 (age 29); Ponoka, Alberta, Canada
- Listed height: 6 ft 6 in (1.98 m)
- Listed weight: 312 lb (142 kg)

Career information
- High school: Lacombe Composite
- University: Alberta
- CFL draft: 2021: 1st round, 5th overall pick

Career history
- 2021–2023: Edmonton Elks
- Stats at CFL.ca

Cole Nelson (born March 12, 1997) is a Canadian professional football offensive lineman and defensive lineman. He previously played for the Edmonton Elks of the Canadian Football League (CFL).

== University career ==
Nelson played U Sports football for the Alberta Golden Bears from 2016 to 2020 as a defensive lineman. He played in 17 games where he had 21 total tackles, one sack, and one fumble recovery.

== Professional career ==
Pre-draft measurables
Height	Weight	40-yard dash	20-yard shuttle	Three-cone drill	Broad jump	Bench press
6 ft 5 7/8 in (1.98 m)	311.8 lb (141 kg)	4.96 s	4.76 s	7.60 s	9 ft 0 5/8 in (2.76 m)	25 reps
All values from CFL Combine

Nelson was drafted in the first round, fifth overall, by the Edmonton Elks in the 2021 CFL draft and signed with the team on June 23, 2021. He began the year on the injured list, but made his professional debut in week 3, on August 19, 2021, against the BC Lions. He played in nine games in 2021 where he had three defensive tackles.

In 2022, Nelson spent the majority of the season on the practice roster and converted to the offensive line. He dressed in one regular season game as a backup defensive lineman. At the end of the season, he signed a one-year contract extension on November 2, 2022. In 2023, Nelson played in 10 regular season games, including eight starts at defensive tackle, where he had 10 defensive tackles. On January 5, 2024, it was announced that he had signed a two-year extension with the Elks. However, he was released prior to training camp on May 12, 2024.
