= Chris Jones (gridiron football coach) =

American gridiron football coach (born 1967)

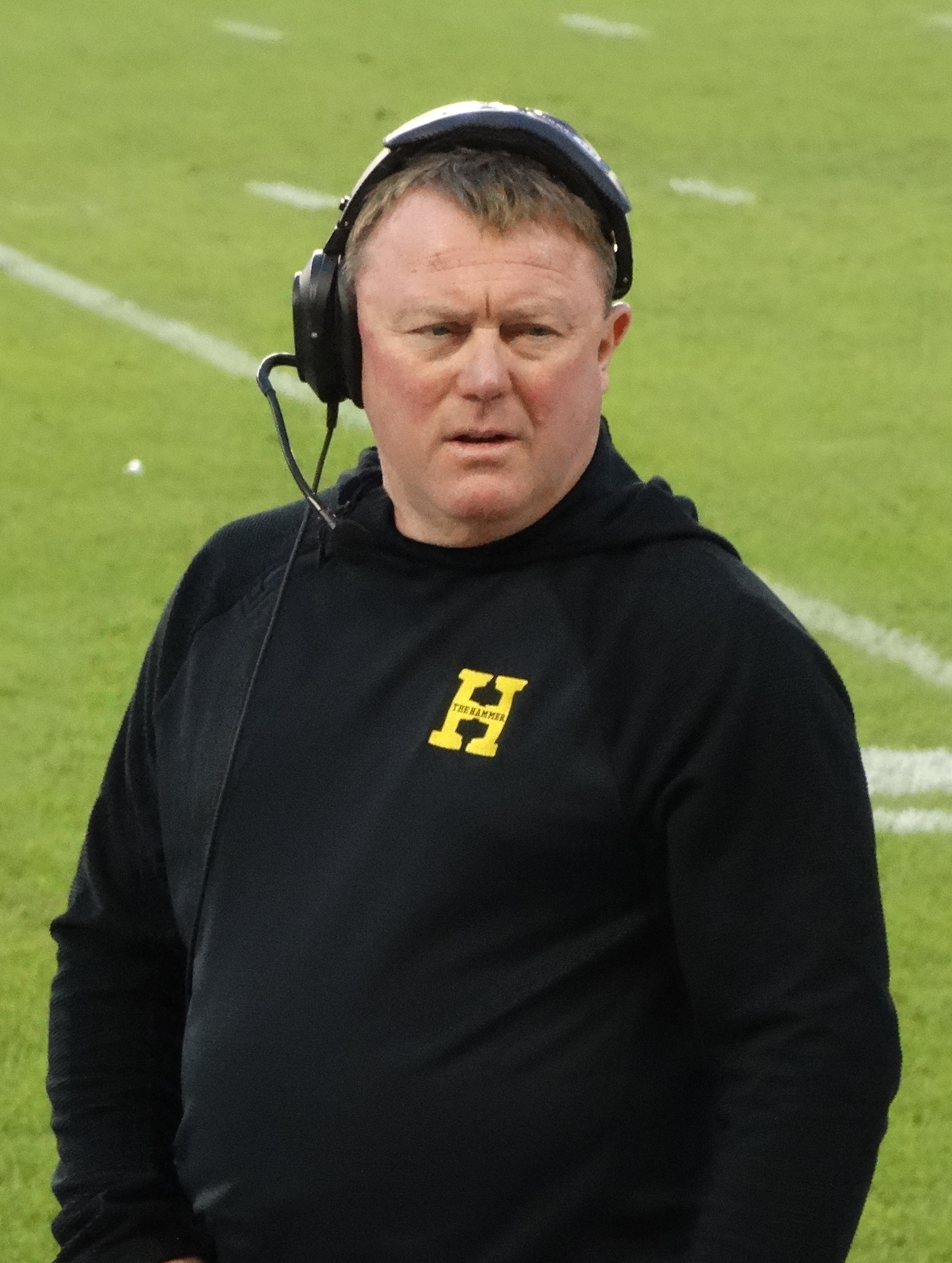
- Jones with the Hamilton Tiger-Cats in 2024

Louisiana–Monroe Warhawks
- Title: Pass game coordinator & safeties coach

Personal information
- Born: September 25, 1967 (age 59); South Pittsburg, Tennessee, U.S.
- Listed height: 5 ft 11 in (1.80 m)

Career information
- College: Chattanooga

Career history
- North Jackson HS (AL) (1993–1994) Assistant coach; Tennessee Tech (1995-1996) Graduate assistant; Alabama (1997) Graduate assistant; UT Martin (1998) Defensive line coach; Tennessee Tech (1999–2001) Defensive line coach / Recruiting coordinator; Montreal Alouettes (2002) Defensive line coach; Montreal Alouettes (2003–2007) Defensive coordinator; Calgary Stampeders (2008–2010) Defensive coordinator; Calgary Stampeders (2010–2011) Def. coord. / Asst. head coach / Asst. Director of Player Personnel; Toronto Argonauts (2012–2013) Def. coord. / Asst. head coach / Asst. general manager; Edmonton Eskimos (2014–2015) Head coach; Saskatchewan Roughriders (2016–2018) Head coach / General manager; Cleveland Browns (2019) Defensive asst. coach; South Pittsburg HS (TN) (2021) Head coach; Toronto Argonauts (2021) Defensive consultant; Edmonton Elks (2022–2024) Head coach / General manager; Hamilton Tiger-Cats (2024) Senior defensive consultant; North Carolina (2025) Senior Associate Director of Player Personnel; Louisiana–Monroe (2026–present) Safeties / pass game coordinator

Awards and highlights
- 4× Grey Cup champion (2002, 2008, 2012, 2015); CFL Coach of the Year (2018)

Chris Jones (born September 25, 1967) is an American football coach. He was previously the head coach and general manager of the Saskatchewan Roughriders and Edmonton Eskimos/Elks. Jones previously served as the defensive coordinator for the Montreal Alouettes, Calgary Stampeders and Toronto Argonauts before becoming a head coach. Jones won four Grey Cup titles with four teams between 2002 and 2015.

== College career ==
Born in South Pittsburg, Tennessee, Jones played college football for the University of Tennessee at Chattanooga as a walk-on, and received little playing time. Instead, he began focusing on a coaching career.

== Coaching career ==
=== NCAA career ===
Jones began his coaching career at North Jackson High School in Stevenson, Alabama, helping the team win a state championship in 1993. He began coaching NCAA football at Tennessee Tech University in 1995, where he served as a graduate assistant under head coach Jim Ragland. After serving one season as a graduate assistant at the University of Alabama, he joined the University of Tennessee at Martin coaching staff as a defensive line coach in 1998. He returned to Tennessee Tech in 1999 as a defensive line coach and recruiting coordinator.

=== Early CFL career ===
Jones moved to the CFL in 2002, after being an assistant coach for Arena League Las Vegas in the spring and summer, after being named the new defensive line coach of the Montreal Alouettes helping Montreal win the 90th Grey Cup. He remained there until 2007. In 2008, he was named defensive coordinator of the Calgary Stampeders, which won the 96th Grey Cup, and was promoted to Assistant Coach in 2010. He later joined the Toronto Argonauts as Defensive Coordinator and was part of the team that won the 100th Grey Cup.

=== Edmonton Eskimos ===
Jones was named head coach of the Edmonton Eskimos in November 2013. After a 12-6 2014 season, he was nominated for CFL Coach of the Year. Jones' Eskimos were victorious over the Ottawa Redblacks in the 103rd Grey Cup game. Following the season the divisional rival Saskatchewan Roughriders were given permission by GM Ed Hervey to entering into negotiations to fill their vacant head coaching position.

=== Saskatchewan Roughriders ===
On December 7, 2015, a mere week after winning the 2015 Grey Cup, it was announced that Jones would be the new general manager and head coach of the Saskatchewan Roughriders. After a disappointing 3–15 season in 2015 Jones took over in 2016 and things got off to a poor start, as the team won only one of their first 11 games. However, down the stretch they won four of the remaining seven games to finish with a record of 5–13. 2017 saw the Riders return to being a competitive team, as the club qualified for the playoffs for the first time since 2014. After defeating the Ottawa Redblacks in a crossover playoff game the Riders were bested by the Toronto Argonauts who went on to win the 105th Grey Cup. Following the season the Riders extended Jones' contract through the 2019 CFL season. Jones and the Riders continued to improve in the 2018 season, accumulating 12 wins, but in the playoffs they were defeated by the Winnipeg Blue Bombers. On January 8, 2019, Jones and the Riders agreed to a new two-year contract extension.

=== Cleveland Browns ===
On January 15, 2019, one week after signing a contract extension with the Roughriders, Jones resigned from the Roughriders to take a two-year contract with the Cleveland Browns as their Senior Defensive Specialist. After one season, Jones was removed from the coaching staff with the hire of new head coach Kevin Stefanski and placed in an office position for the 2020 season.

=== South Pittsburg High School ===
In April 2021, Jones was named the head coach of his high school Alma Mater, the South Pittsburg Pirates in Marion County, Tennessee. He notably ended the school's nearly century-old rivalry game with neighboring Marion County High School for the 2021 and 2022 seasons, in part due to suspicions that a Marion County fan turned South Pittsburg in for recruiting violations during the 2020 season, resulting in South Pittsburg being placed on probation. Jones resigned from the position on September 13 after coaching only one game, a win against Sequatchie County High School, in order to return to a defensive position with the Toronto Argonauts.

=== Toronto Argonauts ===
On September 21, 2021, the Toronto Argonauts announced they had hired Chris Jones as a defensive consultant.

=== Edmonton Elks ===
Two months after being hired by Toronto, on December 21, 2021, it was announced that Jones had returned to Edmonton to become the head coach and general manager of the renamed Edmonton Elks. After a disappointing 2022 season in which the team won only four games and lost 14 the Elks lost their first six games of the 2023 season. With Jones on the hot-seat Elks president Victor Cui reaffirmed his belief in Jones, and commented that any change to head coaching/general manager would impact the team's ops cap in future years. The team lost three more games, beating the previous record for most consecutive winless games at the start of a season of seven. The team began the season with nine straight losses and tied the team's all-time record for losing streaks with 13 consecutive losses. The team finished 4–14 for the second year in a row.

With the team losing its first five games of the 2024 season, Jones was fired on July 15, 2024.

=== Hamilton Tiger-Cats ===
On August 19, 2024, it was announced that Jones had been hired as the senior defensive consultant and would assume defensive play-calling duties for the Hamilton Tiger-Cats, replacing the dismissed Mark Washington who had been the team's defensive coordinator.

=== North Carolina Tar Heels ===
In January 2025, Jones was hired in an assistant administrative role for the North Carolina football program under head coach Bill Belichick.

== Personal life ==
Jones has a son from his first marriage and two daughters with his second wife.

== CFL head coaching record ==
Team	Year	Regular season					Postseason		
Team	Year	Won	Lost	Ties	Win %	Finish	Won	Lost	Result
EDM	2014	12	6	0	.666	2nd in West Division	1	1	Lost in West Final
EDM	2015	14	4	0	.778	1st in West Division	2	0	Won 103rd Grey Cup
SSK	2016	5	13	0	.278	5th in West Division	–	–	Failed to qualify
SSK	2017	10	8	0	.556	4th in West Division	1	1	Lost in East Final
SSK	2018	12	6	0	.667	2nd in West Division	0	1	Lost in West Semi–Final
EDM	2022	4	14	0	.222	5th in West Division	–	–	Failed to qualify
EDM	2023	4	14	0	.222	5th in West Division	–	–	Failed to qualify
EDM	2024	0	5	0	.000	5th in West Division	–	–	Fired
Total		61	70	0	.466	1 Division; Championship	4	3	1 Grey Cup
