= Scott Hutter =

Canadian gridiron football player (born 1997)

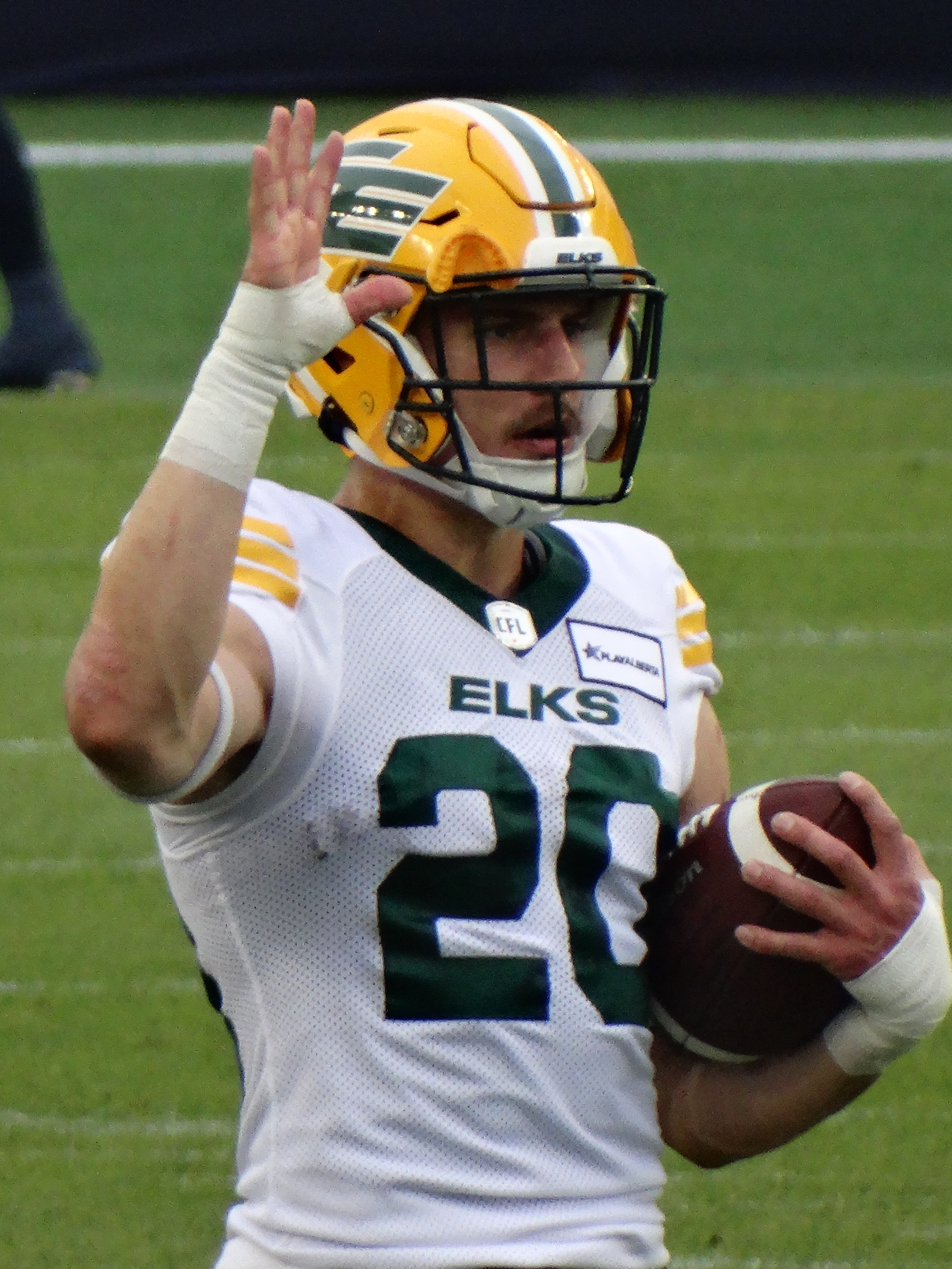
- Hutter with the Edmonton Elks in 2024

Ottawa Redblacks
- Position: Defensive back
- Roster status: Active
- CFL status: National

Personal information
- Born: August 11, 1997 (age 29); London, Ontario, Canada
- Listed height: 6 ft 0 in (1.83 m)
- Listed weight: 195 lb (88 kg)

Career information
- University: Wilfrid Laurier
- CFL draft: 2019: 6th round, 50th overall pick

Career history
- Edmonton Elks (2019–2024); Montreal Alouettes (2025); Ottawa Redblacks (2026–present)
- Stats at CFL.ca

Scott Hutter (born August 11, 1997) is a Canadian professional football defensive back for the Ottawa Redblacks of the Canadian Football League (CFL). He played U Sports football for Wilfrid Laurier. Hutter was drafted by the Edmonton Elks in the sixth round of the 2019 CFL draft.

== University career ==
Scott played four seasons of U Sports football at Wilfrid Laurier for the Golden Hawks (2015–18). In his final season of collegiate football, he was named an OUA Second-Team All-Star. In total he played in 130 games accumulating 135.5 tackles, 6.5 quarterback sacks, 13 pass knockdowns, and 11 interceptions.

== Professional career ==
=== Edmonton Elks ===
After being drafted 50th overall in the sixth round by the Edmonton Elks, Hutter spent his first two seasons primarily playing on special teams. In those first two seasons, he played in a total of 15 games and contributed with 16 special teams tackles. Starting in 2022, he began to feature more regularly on the defensive side of the ball. On October 14, 2022, Hutter and the Elks agreed to a two-year contract extension. He finished the season having played in all 18 regular season games, starting in 13, where he had 57 defensive tackles, nine special teams tackles, five pass knockdowns, one forced fumble, and two fumble recoveries.

In 2023, Hutter reverted to playing more as a backup as he played in 16 regular season games, starting in one, where he had four defensive tackles, 17 special teams tackles, and one pass knockdown. In the 2024 season, he played in just six games where he had four special teams tackles. He became a free agent upon the expiry of his contract on February 11, 2025.

=== Montreal Alouettes ===
On June 9, 2025, it was announced that Hutter had been signed by the Montreal Alouettes. He became a free agent upon the expiry of his contract on February 10, 2026.

=== Ottawa Redblacks ===
On February 10, 2026, it was announced that Hutter had signed with the Ottawa Redblacks.
