= J-Min Pelley =

Canadian gridiron football player (born 1998)

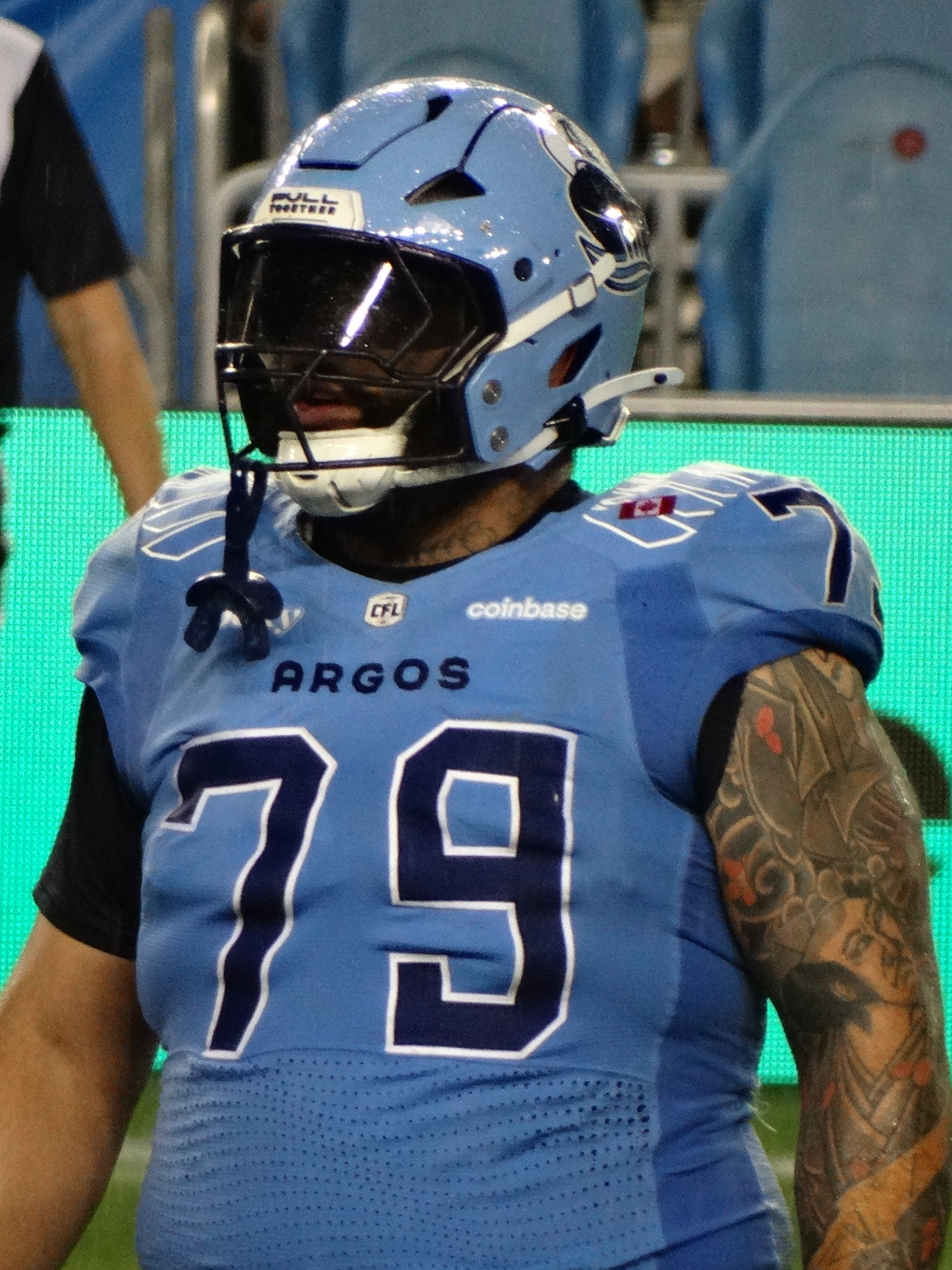
- Pelley with the Toronto Argonauts in 2025

Profile
- Position: Defensive lineman

Personal information
- Born: March 23, 1998 (age 28); Calgary, Alberta, Canada
- Listed height: 6 ft 5 in (1.96 m)
- Listed weight: 330 lb (150 kg)

Career information
- CJFL: Okanagan Sun
- University: Calgary
- CFL draft: 2022

Career history
- 2022–2024: Edmonton Elks
- 2025: Toronto Argonauts
- Stats at CFL.ca

J-Min Pelley (born March 23, 1998) is a Canadian professional football defensive lineman. He most recently played for the Toronto Argonauts of the Canadian Football League (CFL). He played U Sports football for the Calgary Dinos.

== Amateur career ==
Pelley received "Athlete of the Year" honours with his Bishop McNally High School, playing football, rugby, basketball, and track.

Pelley played with his University team the Calgary Dinos in 2019 and 2020. Before signing with Calgary he received offers from multiple universities. Pelley said he wanted to play for his hometown, and that he wanted to play with the Dinos specifically because he watched them when he was younger. He won the 55th Vanier Cup with them in 2019, while making 2 sacks in the championship game. He was also selected to the second all Canadian team on defense in the same year.

Pelley played with the Okanagan Sun in 2018 and earned conference all star status. He also played with Football Canada on the 2016 junior national team.

== Professional career ==
=== Edmonton Elks ===
The Edmonton Elks drafted Pelley in the 2022 CFL Supplemental Draft. Pelley was not eligible until the 2023 Draft but was granted special inclusion by Randy Ambrosie, the CFL Commissioner. Pelley was rated highly as a prospect, and was considered to have been a top three pick if he was eligible. When talking about Pelley being an option for the 2022 Supplemental draft, Jeff Hamilton of the Winnipeg Free Press said Pelley's availability to Edmonton (along with their expected first overall pick) would give them a clear advantage. Hamilton also discussed that Pelley may have been made available due to him having aged out of junior football, and having to wait a year before the 2023 CFL draft may have caused issues with Pelleys raising children.

Before the first home game of the 2022 season, promoting Commonwealth Stadium's clear bag policy, Pelley was involved in an ad for the Elks branded clear bags. In it, he pours out a can of baked beans into the bag, before taking a handful and eating them. This ad earned him the nickname "Big Bean Guy."

In an interview about the Battle of Alberta, Pelley talked about the switch from Calgary to Edmonton. Having formerly played for the Calgary Dinos, who share McMahon Stadium with the Calgary Stampeders of the CFL, he noted how it felt confusing going to the visitors locker-room after years of playing for Calgary. In his rookie year, in 2022, Pelley appeared in 16 games and recorded 11 defensive tackles.

In January 2023, Pelley declared for the 2023 NFL draft, but was not selected. He remained with the Elks where he played in nine regular season games in 2023 and recorded eight defensive tackles. In 2024, he played in 11 regular season games and had six defensive tackles. On February 12, 2025, it was announced that Pelley had been released by the Elks.

=== Toronto Argonauts ===
On June 23, 2025, it was announced that Pelley had signed with the Toronto Argonauts. He played in 15 games in 2025 where he had 12 defensive tackles and two sacks. He became a free agent upon the expiry of his contract on February 10, 2026.

== Playing style ==
Pelley is known for his ability to push through opponents, allowing him to have taken position as running back for a touchdown with the Dinos. He is also known for his ability to create pressure that causes opponents to rethink their strategy when playing against him.

Edmonton Elks defensive line coach Demetrious Maxie described Pelly as "One of a Kind" as well as quick, athletic, bright, and explosive.
