= Jeremie Dominique =

Canadian gridiron football player (born 1997)

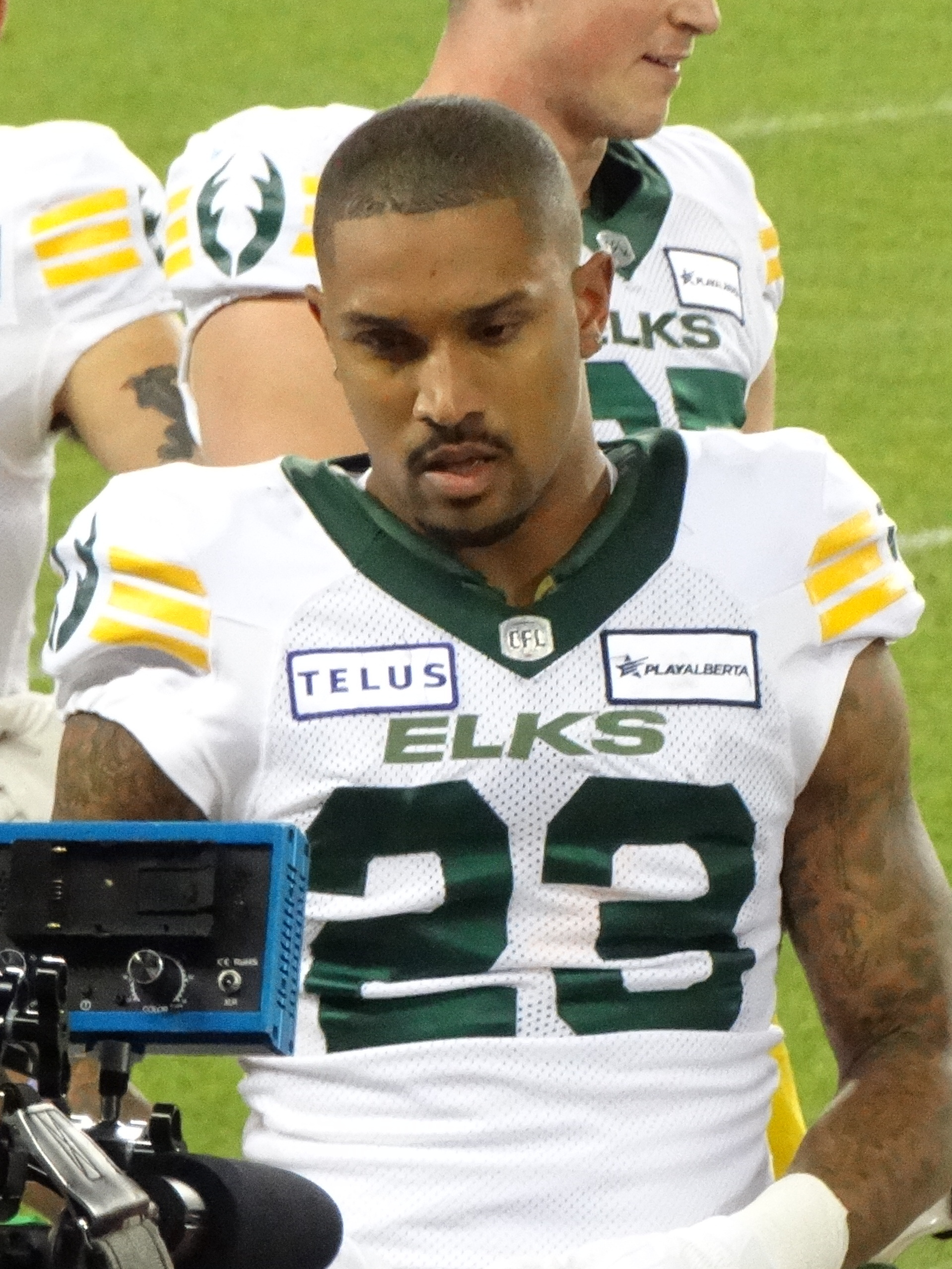
- Dominique with the Edmonton Elks in 2023

Profile
- Position: Defensive back

Personal information
- Born: July 9, 1997 (age 29); Montreal, Quebec, Canada
- Listed height: 6 ft 1 in (1.85 m)
- Listed weight: 202 lb (92 kg)

Career information
- CEGEP: Cégep du Vieux Montréal
- College: Charleston
- CFL draft: 2022: 6th round, 48th overall pick

Career history
- 2022–2024: Edmonton Elks
- Stats at CFL.ca

Jeremie Dominique (born July 9, 1997) is a Canadian professional football defensive back.

== College career ==
Dominique first played college football for the Hawaii Rainbow Warriors in 2017, where he played in seven games as a backup defensive back and had four tackles. In 2018, he had a severe ankle injury, but played in six games, sparingly, despite the injury. After undergoing foot surgery, he transferred to the University of North Dakota in order to be closer to his family home in Montreal. However, he did not play for the North Dakota Fighting Hawks as his ankle healed in 2019. Instead, Dominique entered the NCAA transfer portal in early 2020 with the intention of playing for an FBS program. Unfortunately, the COVID-19 pandemic caused many programs to cancel their seasons and he received no substantial offers.

With the lack of NCAA Division I opportunities, Dominique transferred to the University of Charleston to play for Golden Eagles for their 2020–21 spring season, where he played in three games. In the 2021 season, he played in ten games where he had 40 total tackles, two sacks, and three pass deflections.

== Professional career ==
Dominique was drafted in the second round, 19th overall, by the Edmonton Elks in the 2022 CFL draft and signed with the team on May 11, 2022. Following training camp in 2022, he made the team's active roster and made his professional debut on June 11, 2022, against the BC Lions. He played in 15 regular season games in his rookie year where he recorded three defensive tackles, six special teams tackles, two forced fumbles, and one fumble recovery.

In 2023, Dominique played in 14 regular season games where he had seven special teams tackles. He was released shortly after the completion of the 2024 CFL draft on May 1, 2024. However, following several injuries to special teams players, the Elks re-signed Dominique on August 13, 2024.
