= Kai Gray =

American gridiron football player (born 1997)

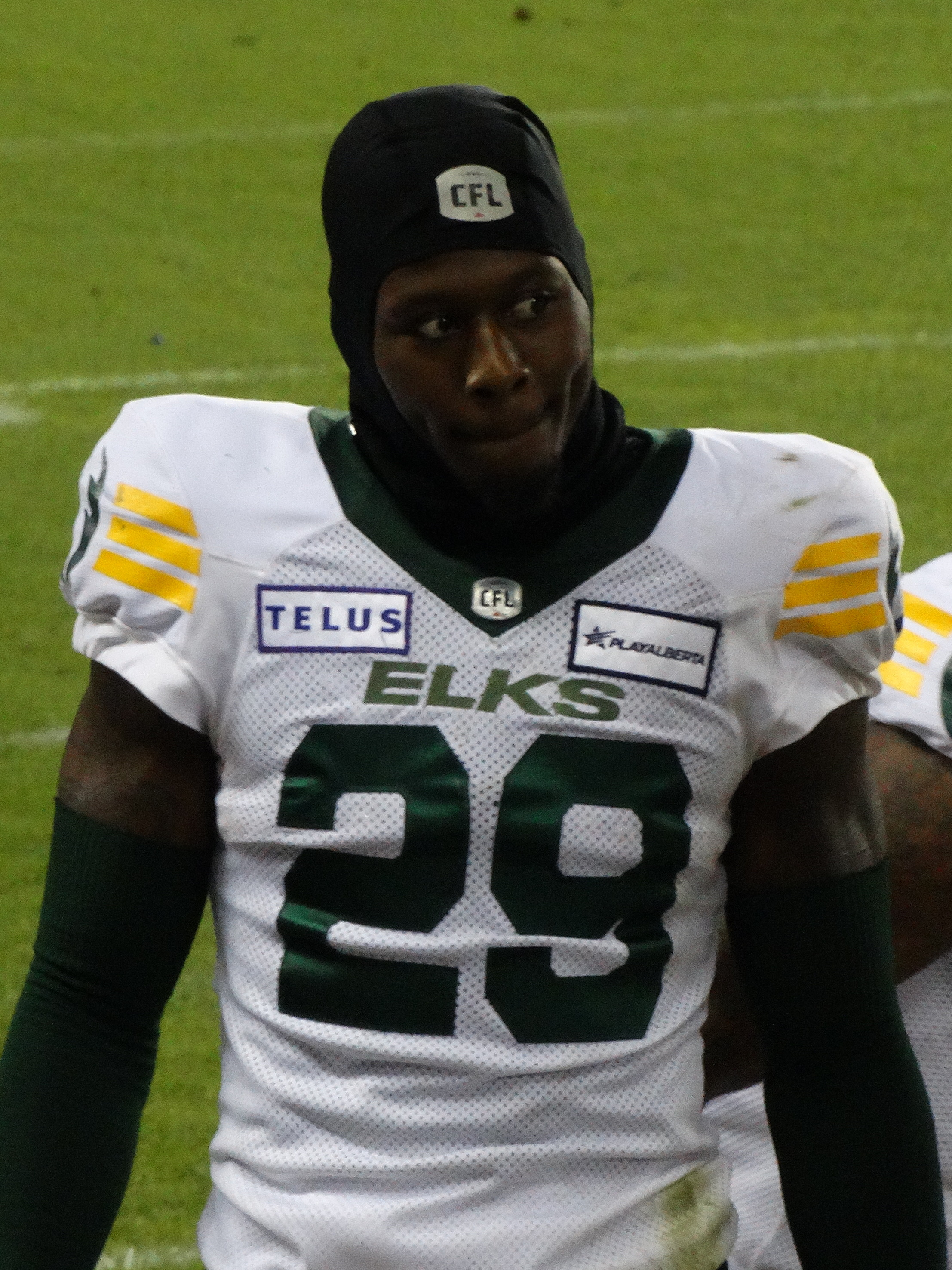
- Gray with the Edmonton Elks in 2023

No. 17 – DC Defenders
- Position: Defensive back
- Roster status: Active

Personal information
- Born: August 15, 1997 (age 29); Newark, New Jersey, U.S.
- Listed height: 6 ft 1 in (1.85 m)
- Listed weight: 215 lb (98 kg)

Career information
- High school: St. Peter's Prep (Jersey City, NJ)
- College: Rutgers (2016–2017); Sam Houston State (2019–2021); Lincoln (PA) (2022)

Career history
- 2023–2024: Edmonton Elks
- 2026–present: DC Defenders

Awards and highlights
- Jackie Parker Trophy (2023)
- Stats at CFL.ca

Kai Gray (born August 15, 1997) is an American professional football defensive back for the DC Defenders of the United Football League (UFL). He previously played for the Edmonton Elks of the Canadian Football League (CFL).

== College career ==
Gray first played college football for the Rutgers Scarlet Knights from 2016 to 2017. He played in 20 games, with four starts, where he had 73 tackles and three interceptions. Gray did not play in 2018 after being involved in a credit card fraud scheme, although the charges were eventually expunged from his record.

Gray then transferred to Sam Houston State University in 2019 to play for the Bearkats where he played in 11 games and had 31 tackles, one interception, and one forced fumble. He transferred again to Tabor College, but did not play in a football game there. In 2022, he transferred to Lincoln University and played for the Lions where he played in eight games and had 82 tackles, four forced fumbles, and seven pass deflections.

== Professional career ==
Pre-draft measurables
Height	Weight
6 ft 0 1/2 in (1.84 m)	208 lb (94 kg)
Values from Pro Day

=== Edmonton Elks ===
On January 9, 2023, it was announced that Gray had signed with the Edmonton Elks. He earned a starting position at cornerback following training camp and played in his first professional game on June 11, 2023, against the Saskatchewan Roughriders. In his debut, he recorded four defensive tackles and also had his first career interception as he picked off a pass thrown by Trevor Harris in the eventual loss to the Roughriders. Gray continued to establish himself as a starter and recorded a career-high eight defensive tackles in the Labour Day Classic against the Calgary Stampeders. On September 22, 2023, he intercepted a pass thrown by BC Lions quarterback Vernon Adams and returned the ball 56 yards to score the first touchdown of his professional career.

Gray finished the 2023 season having played in all 18 games where he recorded 54 defensive tackles, two special teams tackles, two interceptions, and one touchdown. At season's end, he was named the West Division nominee for the CFL's Most Outstanding Rookie Award.

=== DC Defenders ===
On January 22, 2026, Gray signed with the DC Defenders of the United Football League (UFL).
