= Phillip Grohovac =

Canadian gridiron football player (born 2000)

Profile
- Position: Offensive lineman

Personal information
- Born: July 16, 2000 (age 26); Victoria, British Columbia, Canada
- Listed height: 6 ft 4 in (1.93 m)
- Listed weight: 305 lb (138 kg)

Career information
- University: Western
- CFL draft: 2023: 3rd round, 20th overall pick

Career history
- 2023–present: Edmonton Elks

Awards and highlights
- Vanier Cup champion (2017)
- Stats at CFL.ca

Phillip Grohovac (born July 16, 2000) is a Canadian professional football offensive lineman.

== University career ==
Grohovac played U Sports football for the Western Mustangs from 2018 to 2022 where he played in 23 games. He won a Vanier Cup championship in 2017 after the Mustangs defeated the Laval Rouge et Or in the 53rd Vanier Cup.

== Professional career ==
Pre-draft measurables
Height	Weight	40-yard dash	20-yard shuttle	Three-cone drill	Vertical jump	Broad jump	Bench press
6 ft 4 3/8 in (1.94 m)	314 lb (142 kg)	5.39 s	4.94 s	8.28 s	24.5 in (0.62 m)	7 ft 10 in (2.39 m)	26 reps
All values from CFL Combine

Grohovac was drafted in the third round, 20th overall, by the Edmonton Elks in the 2023 CFL draft and signed with the team on May 8, 2023. Following training camp in 2023, he made the team's active roster and made his professional debut on June 11, 2023, against the Saskatchewan Roughriders. He dressed in seven regular season games in his rookie year and made his first career start on July 7, 2023, also against the Roughriders.

In 2024, Grohovac played in 11 regular season games as he also played three games at fullback. The Elks released Grohovac on September 8, 2025.
