= Peter Adjey =

Canadian gridiron football player (born 1999)

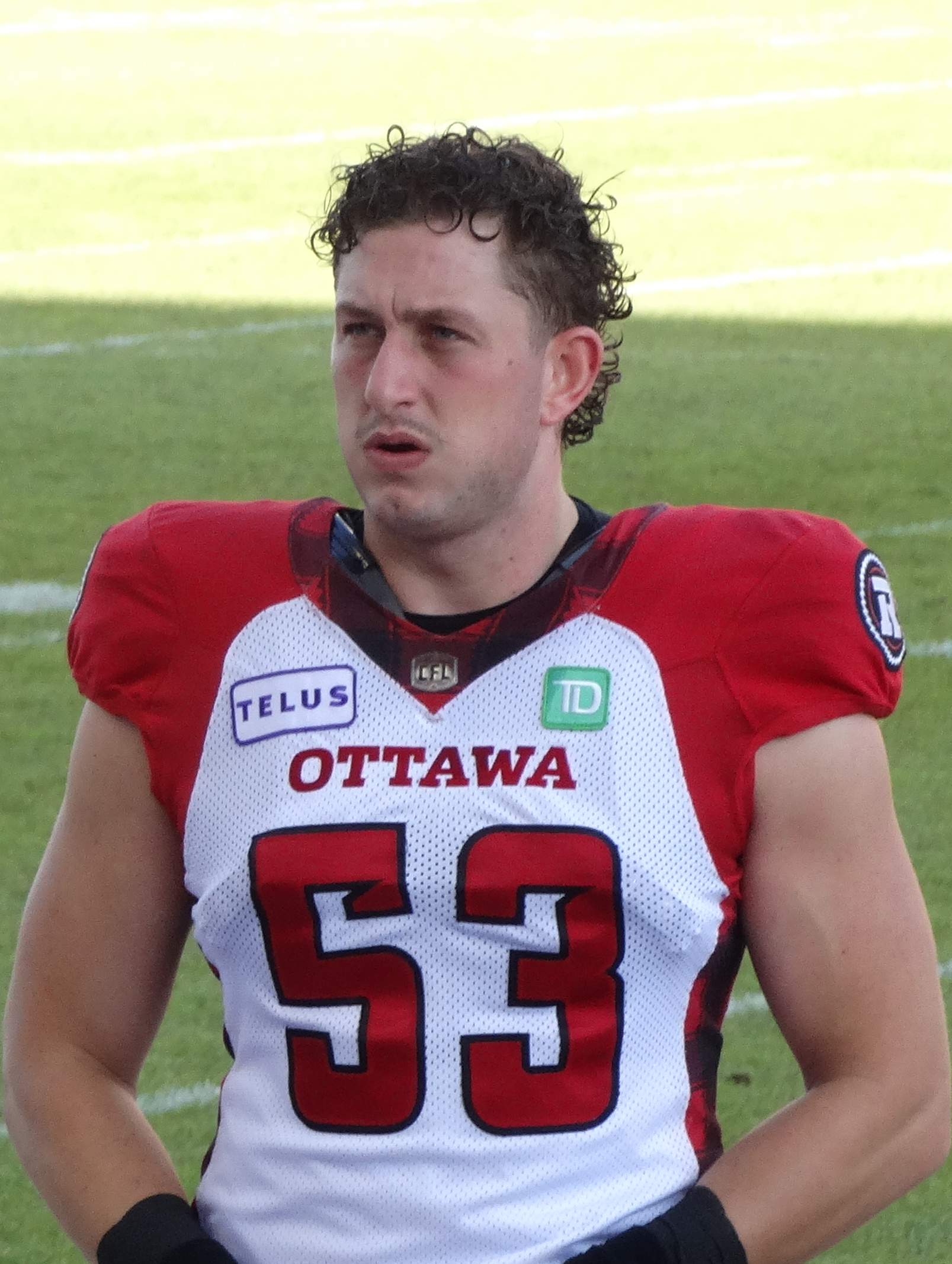
- Adjey with the Ottawa Redblacks in 2024

No. 53 – Ottawa Redblacks
- Position: Long snapper
- Roster status: 6-game injured list
- CFL status: National

Personal information
- Born: June 20, 1999 (age 27); Santa Barbara, California, USA
- Listed height: 6 ft 3 in (1.91 m)
- Listed weight: 240 lb (109 kg)

Career information
- High school: Leaside High
- University: Queen's
- CFL draft: 2022: 3rd round, 28th overall pick

Career history
- 2022–2023: Edmonton Elks
- 2024–present: Ottawa Redblacks
- Stats at CFL.ca

Peter Adjey (born June 20, 1999) is a Canadian professional football long snapper for the Ottawa Redblacks of the Canadian Football League (CFL).

== University career ==
Adjey played U Sports football for the Queen's Gaels from 2018 to 2021.

== Professional career ==
=== Edmonton Elks ===
Adjey was drafted in the third round, 28th overall, by the Edmonton Elks in the 2022 CFL draft and signed with the team on May 11, 2022. He won the long snapper job following training camp and made his professional debut on June 11, 2022, against the BC Lions. He played in all 18 regular season games in 2022 where he had three special teams tackles and one fumble recovery.

In 2023, Adjey again played in all 18 regular season games and recorded two special teams tackles.

=== Ottawa Redblacks ===
On May 1, 2024, Adjey was traded to the Ottawa Redblacks in exchange for a third-round pick in the 2025 CFL draft. In October 2024, Adjey was signed to a two-year contract extension.
