= Chris Osei-Kusi =

Canadian gridiron football player (born 1997)

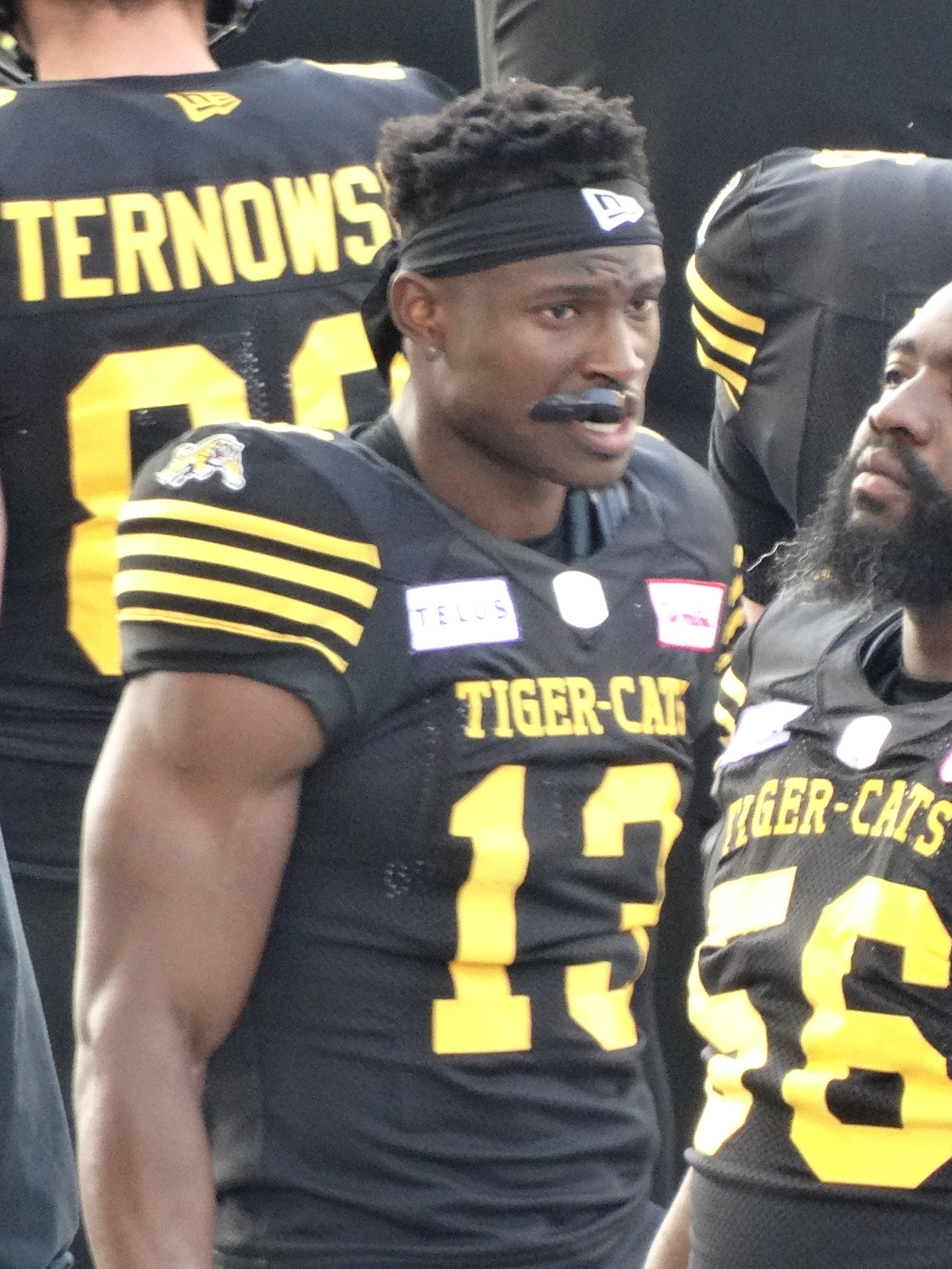
- Osei-Kusi with the Hamilton Tiger-Cats in 2023

Profile
- Position: Wide receiver

Personal information
- Born: September 22, 1997 (age 29); Brampton, Ontario, Canada
- Listed height: 6 ft 2 in (1.88 m)
- Listed weight: 200 lb (91 kg)

Career information
- High school: Cardinal Ambrozic
- University: Windsor; Queen's
- CFL draft: 2019: 4th round, 30th overall pick

Career history
- 2019–2021: Montreal Alouettes*
- 2021–2022: Edmonton Elks
- 2023: Hamilton Tiger-Cats
- * Offseason or practice squad member only
- Stats at CFL.ca

Chris Osei-Kusi born September 22, 1997, is a Canadian professional football wide receiver.

== University career ==
Osei-Kusi played U Sports football for the Queen's Gaels from 2015 to 2018. He played in 28 games where he had 126 receptions for 1,862 yards and eight receiving touchdowns, while also scoring a rushing touchdown, and a punt return touchdown.

He participated in the CFL National Combine, in 2019, and earned a combine all-star honours by running a 4.47 40-yard dash, which was the fastest among all the combine participants, and put up 19 reps on the bench press, which was the highest among all receivers. Following this stellar combine, Osei-Kusi was invited to the Cleveland Browns mini-camp. He was 1 of 8 Canadians to be invited to an NFL mini-camp this year.

He then transferred to the University of Windsor in 2019, to complete his law degree, and played for the Lancers where he appeared in seven games and recorded 34 receptions for 560 yards and two touchdowns.

== Professional career ==
Pre-draft measurables
Height	Weight	40-yard dash	20-yard shuttle	Three-cone drill	Vertical jump	Broad jump	Bench press
6 ft 0 3/8 in (1.84 m)	192 lb (87 kg)	4.47 s	4.31 s	7.19 s	35.5 in (0.90 m)	9 ft 7 7/8 in (2.94 m)	19 reps
All values from CFL Combine

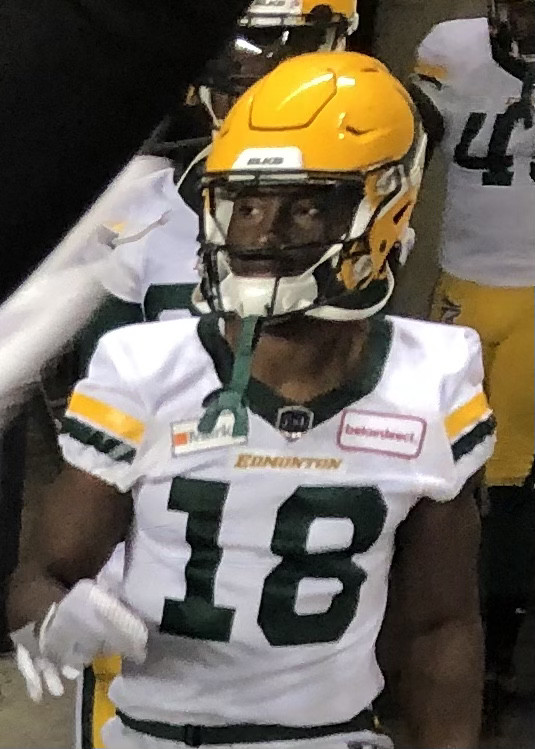
Osei-Kusi with the Edmonton Elks in 2021

=== Montreal Alouettes ===
Osei-Kusi was selected in the fourth round, 30th overall, by the Montreal Alouettes in the 2019 CFL draft. He attended training camp in 2019 and played in both pre-season games, but he returned to school and completed his U Sports eligibility. He re-signed with the team for a two-year contract on January 15, 2020, but did not play in 2020 due to the cancellation of the 2020 CFL season.

In 2021, Osei-Kusi began the season on the practice roster, but was released on September 13, 2021.

=== Edmonton Elks ===
On September 21, 2021, Osei-Kusi signed with the Edmonton Elks. He played in his first professional game on October 29, 2021, against the Hamilton Tiger-Cats. He played in five regular season games where he had one special teams tackle.

In 2022, he made the team's opening day roster and played in 17 games, starting in four, where he had six catches for 79 yards and six special teams tackles. He became a free agent upon the expiry of his contract on February 14, 2023.

=== Hamilton Tiger-Cats ===
On February 17, 2023, it was announced that Osei-Kusi had signed with the Hamilton Tiger-Cats. He began the season on the active roster, but was moved to the practice roster in week 4. He returned to the active roster for the team's 15th game of the season and started the last three regular season games of 2023. Osei-Kusi played in seven regular season games, starting in four, where he had three receptions for 13 yards. He became a free agent after that season.
