= Gavin Cobb =

Canadian gridiron football player (born 1998)

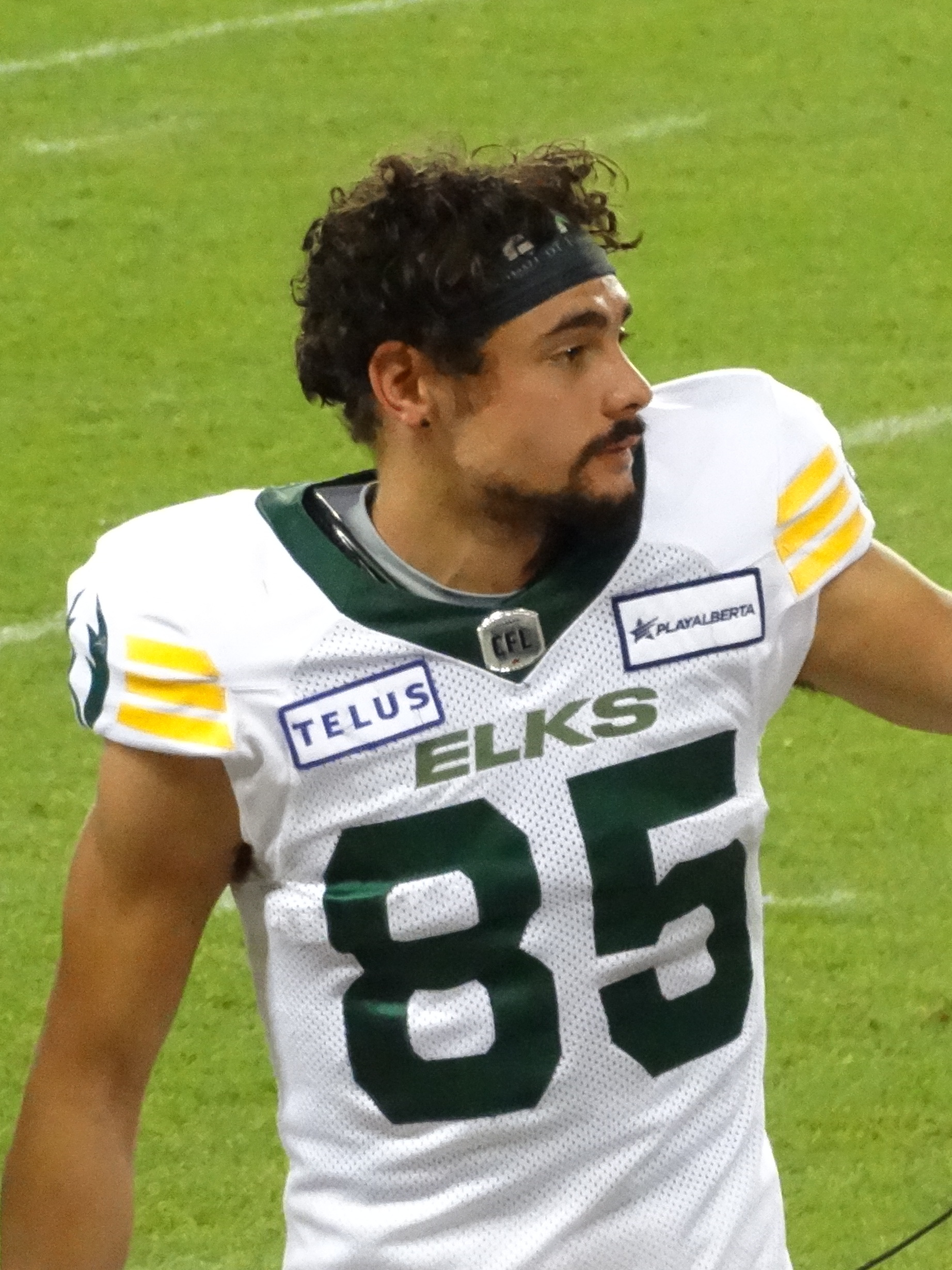
- Cobb with the Edmonton Elks in 2023

No. 82 – Winnipeg Blue Bombers
- Position: Wide receiver
- Roster status: Active
- CFL status: National

Personal information
- Born: January 22, 1998 (age 28); Victoria, British Columbia, Canada
- Listed height: 5 ft 10 in (1.78 m)
- Listed weight: 179 lb (81 kg)

Career information
- High school: Mount Douglas Secondary
- College: Simon Fraser
- University: Manitoba
- CFL draft: 2022: 4th round, 30th overall pick

Career history
- Edmonton Elks (2022–2024); Winnipeg Blue Bombers (2025–present)

Career CFL statistics as of 2026
- Receptions: 41
- Receiving yards: 504
- Receiving touchdowns: 2
- Stats at CFL.ca

Gavin Cobb (born January 22, 1998) is a Canadian professional football wide receiver for the Winnipeg Blue Bombers of the Canadian Football League (CFL).

== University career ==
Cobb first played NCAA football for the Simon Fraser Clan from 2016 to 2019, while using a redshirt season in 2018. He then transferred to the University of Manitoba, where he would be able to finish his degree faster, playing for the Bisons of U Sports football. However, Cobb did not play in 2020 due to the cancelled 2020 U Sports football season. In 2021, he played in six regular season games and two post-season games where he had 27 receptions for 340 yards and five touchdowns.

== Professional career ==
Pre-draft measurables
Height	Weight	40-yard dash	20-yard shuttle	Three-cone drill	Vertical jump	Broad jump	Bench press
5 ft 9 3/8 in (1.76 m)	170 lb (77 kg)	4.53 s	4.24 s	6.97 s	40.5 in (1.03 m)	10 ft 9 7/8 in (3.30 m)	3 reps
All values from CFL Combine

=== Edmonton Elks ===
Cobb was drafted in the fifth round, 30th overall, by the Edmonton Elks in the 2022 CFL draft and signed with the team on May 11, 2022. However, he suffered a severe ankle injury in the second pre-season game of 2022 and was on the injured list for the entire regular season.

Following training camp in 2023, Cobb made the team's active roster and played in his first professional game on June 11, 2023, against the Saskatchewan Roughriders. He later earned his first start on July 29, 2023, against the BC Lions. On October 6, 2023, against the Toronto Argonauts, Cobb scored his first career touchdown on a 16-yard pass from Tre Ford. He finished the season having played in all 18 regular season games where he recorded 11 receptions for 214 yards and one touchdown, six punt returns for 51 yards, and 11 kickoff returns for 260 yards.

In 2024, Cobb played in 11 regular season games where he had seven receptions for 94 yards and one touchdown. He became a free agent upon the expiry of his contract on February 11, 2025.

=== Winnipeg Blue Bombers ===
On February 11, 2025, it was announced that Cobb had signed again with the Winnipeg Blue Bombers.
