= Vincent Forbes-Mombleau =

Canadian gridiron football player (born 1998)

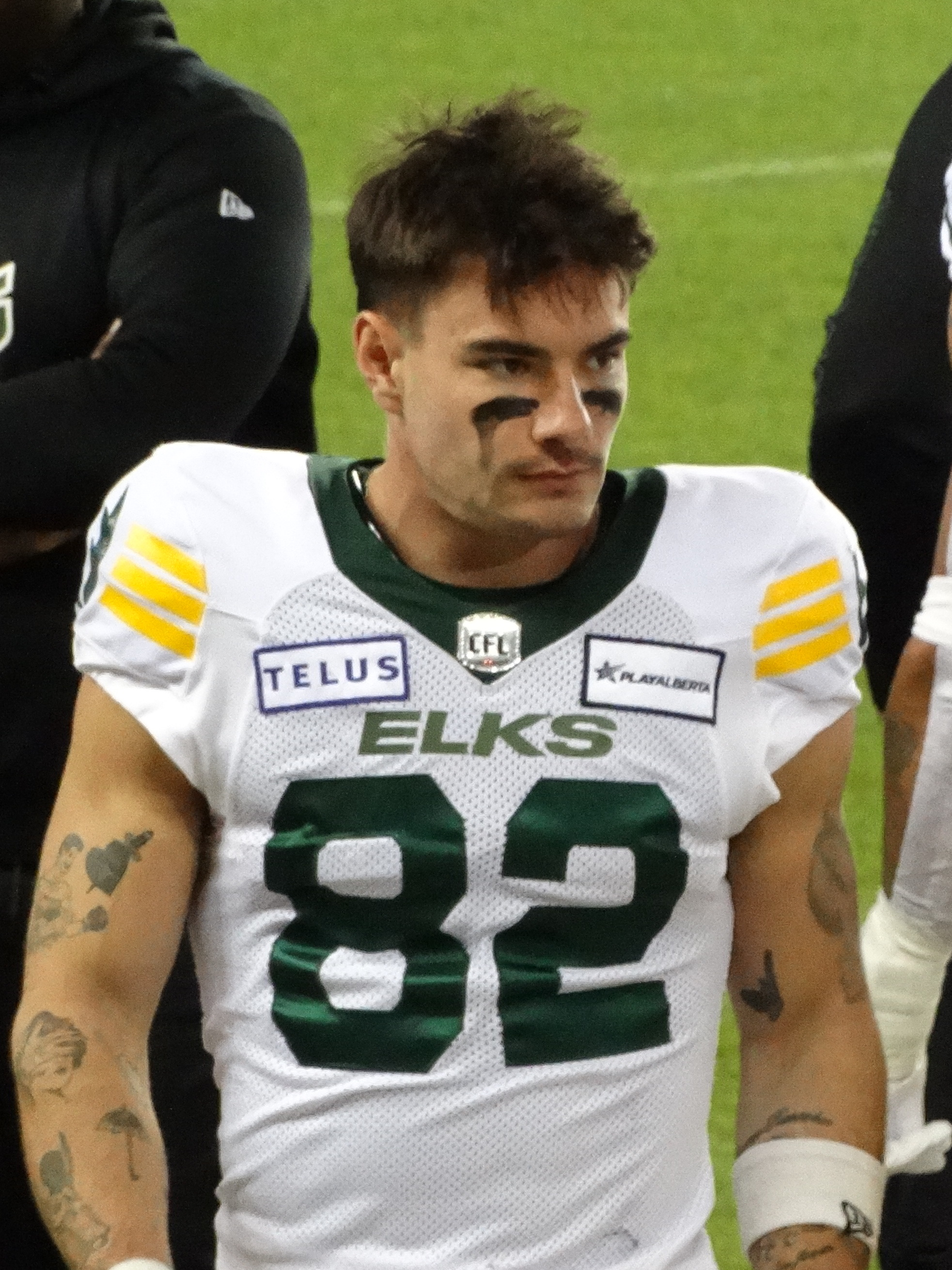
- Forbes-Mombleau with the Edmonton Elks in 2023

Profile
- Position: Wide receiver

Personal information
- Born: July 29, 1998 (age 28); Quebec City, Quebec, Canada
- Listed height: 5 ft 9 in (1.75 m)
- Listed weight: 190 lb (86 kg)

Career information
- University: Laval
- CFL draft: 2024: 3rd round, 24th overall pick

Career history
- 2022: Montreal Alouettes*
- 2022–2024: Edmonton Elks
- * Offseason or practice squad member only

Awards and highlights
- Vanier Cup champion (2018)
- Stats at CFL.ca

Vincent Forbes-Mombleau (born July 29, 1998) is a Canadian professional football wide receiver.

== University career ==
Forbes-Mombleau played U Sports football for the Laval Rouge et Or from 2018 to 2021. He was named the RSEQ Rookie of the Year in 2018, capping off the season with a victory in the 54th Vanier Cup game.

== Professional career ==
Pre-draft measurables
Height	Weight	Bench press
5 ft 9 1/2 in (1.77 m)	193 lb (88 kg)	22 reps
All values from CFL Combine

=== Montreal Alouettes ===
Forbes-Mombleau was drafted in the third round, 24th overall, by the Montreal Alouettes in the 2022 CFL draft and signed with the team on May 13, 2022. However, following training camp, he was released with the final cuts.

=== Edmonton Elks ===
On July 18, 2022, it was announced that Forbes-Mombleau had signed a practice roster agreement with the Edmonton Elks. After five games on the practice roster, he made his professional debut, and first career start, on September 5, 2022, against the Calgary Stampeders in the Labour Day Classic, where he had two receptions for 26 yards. He played and started in four regular season games in 2022 where he recorded five receptions for 92 yards.

Following training camp in 2023, Forbes-Mombleau made the team's active roster on opening day. On June 25, 2023, against the Toronto Argonauts, he scored his first career touchdown on a two-yard pass from Jarret Doege with 2:38 left to play. He also had the first multi-touchdown game of his career in the same game, as he scored an 84-yard touchdown with six seconds left to play in the 43–31 loss to the Argonauts. He finished the year having played in all 18 regular season games where he recorded 15 receptions for 203 yards and two touchdowns.
