= Wihan van der Riet =

South African player of Canadian football

Profile
- Position: Kicker

Personal information
- Born: August 29, 1989 (age 37); South Africa
- Listed height: 6 ft 1 in (1.85 m)
- Listed weight: 220 lb (100 kg)

Career history
- Saskatchewan Roughriders (2021)*; Edmonton Elks (2022)*
- * Offseason or practice squad member only
- Stats at CFL.ca

Wihan "Rocketfoot" van der Riet (born August 29, 1989) is a South African professional Canadian football placekicker.

== Biography ==
Wihan van der Riet was born on August 29, 1989, in South Africa. In 2013, van der Riet posted a video of him making field goals which got the attention of former National Football League (NFL) player Michael Husted. Husted later invited him to a kicking camp in San Diego. While in San Diego, he worked out with their football team, the Chargers. When he returned to South Africa, he received workout invitations from the Green Bay Packers of the National Football League (NFL) and three indoor football teams: the Chicago Eagles, Nebraska Danger, and Albany Empire. He couldn't accept the offers due to a work visa issue and then shifted to coaching rather than playing. He founded the "Rocketfoot Kicking Academy", a training establishment for youth kickers, shortly afterwards. In 2019, he worked out with the BC Lions of the Canadian Football League but did not sign. In 2020, he claimed to be able to kick field goals as long as 80 meters. In April 2021, he signed his first contract as a member of the Saskatchewan Roughriders of the Canadian Football League (CFL). He was released on June 18, 2021. In February 2022, van der Riet was signed by the Edmonton Elks. He was placed on the reserve/suspended list on May 15, 2022. He was released on July 19, 2023.
