= Christian Saulsberry =

American gridiron football player (1997–2022)

No. 25
- Positions: Return specialist, wide receiver

Personal information
- Born: December 12, 1997; Southaven, Mississippi, U.S.
- Died: December 17, 2022 (aged 25); Walls, Mississippi, U.S.
- Listed height: 5 ft 8 in (1.73 m)
- Listed weight: 188 lb (85 kg)

Career information
- High school: Southaven High School; Northpoint Christian School
- College: Itawamba CC; West Alabama

Career history
- 2021: FCF Beasts
- 2022: Edmonton Elks

Career CFL statistics
- Return yards: 948
- Receptions: 1
- Receiving yards: 17
- Stats at CFL.ca

Christian Saulsberry (December 12, 1997 – December 17, 2022) was an American football return specialist and wide receiver who played one season in the Canadian Football League (CFL) for the Edmonton Elks. He played college football at Itawamba CC and West Alabama; he also had a stint playing with the FCF Beasts. Saulsberry was murdered in December 2022, while still under contract with Edmonton.

== Early life and education ==
Saulsberry was born December 12, 1997, in Southaven, Mississippi. He attended Southaven High School during his freshman and sophomore years before transferring to Northpoint Christian School as a junior. He played baseball and football; he was a defensive back and running back in football. As a senior Saulsberry was a team captain and ran for 1,390 yards, scoring 19 combined rushing and receiving touchdowns; he led his team to 13 consecutive wins and the state championship where they lost 50–20. He received many honors for his senior performance, including selection to the AutoZone Liberty Bowl, first-team all-state, all-district, and TSSAA Division II Offensive Player of the Year among others. Saulsberry played for two years at Northpoint Christian with 2,606 rushing yards and 34 touchdowns.

Saulsberry was a two-star recruit and joined Itawamba Community College in 2016 after graduating from Northpoint Christian. He played two seasons there, recording 55 catches for 658 yards and two touchdowns, being named MACJC first-team all-state in 2017. After graduating from Itawamba CC, Saulsberry joined Division II West Alabama for his final two seasons. He was named All-Gulf South Conference (GSC) as a junior after compiling 52 catches for 644 yards and four scores while also recording 29 kick returns for 838 yards and one touchdown, totaling a team-leading 1,484 all-purpose yards. As a senior, he again received the honor after posting 580 receiving yards and three touchdowns, with an additional 614 return yards for 1,223 total yards. Saulsberry ended his time at West Alabama with 1,224 receiving yards and seven touchdowns while appearing in 23 games.

== Professional career ==
Saulsberry was eligible for the 2020 NFL draft but was not selected. After not being on any team in the 2020 season, he was selected with the top pick by the Beasts in the Fan Controlled Football (FCF) draft. He was one of the players they franchise tagged. He scored a touchdown in the Beasts' game against the Zappers.

In May 2022, Saulsberry was signed by the Edmonton Elks of the Canadian Football League (CFL). In two preseason games, he recorded six kick returns for 172 yards, four rushes for nine yards and two catches for 18 yards. Although released following training camp, he was re-signed to the practice roster in August. He made his debut against the Ottawa Redblacks on August 27, eventually became the team's main return specialist, and by October was one of the top five players in the league for punt return average with 11.6 yards per return.

In a game against the Winnipeg Blue Bombers, Saulsberry recorded 175 kick return yards, the tenth most in a single game in team history, and with an additional 30 punt return yards became the first Edmonton player in nearly a decade with over 200 return yards in one game. By his sixth game, despite missing a large chunk of the season, he was ranked seventh in the league in kick return yards and tenth in punt return yards. He also averaged 85.7 kick return yards-per-game by that time by leading all of the CFL. Saulsberry finished the season having appeared in eight games, and recorded 948 total return yards, one reception for 17 yards, and one rush for seven yards. His longest return was 51 yards on a missed field goal return. He was named the Elks' most outstanding special teams player for the 2022 season.

== Death ==
Saulsberry was shot at a party in Walls, Mississippi which is part of the Memphis metropolitan area, on December 17, 2022, five days after his 25th birthday. He died while en route to the hospital. The shooter, 24-year-old Mark McDaniel, was arrested later that day. In November 2024, McDaniel was convicted of second degree murder after a three-day trial. The following month, he was sentenced to 20 years in prison plus five years of post-release supervision.

== See also ==
- List of gridiron football players who died during their careers
