= Noah Curtis (Canadian football) =

American–Canadian gridiron football player (born 1998)

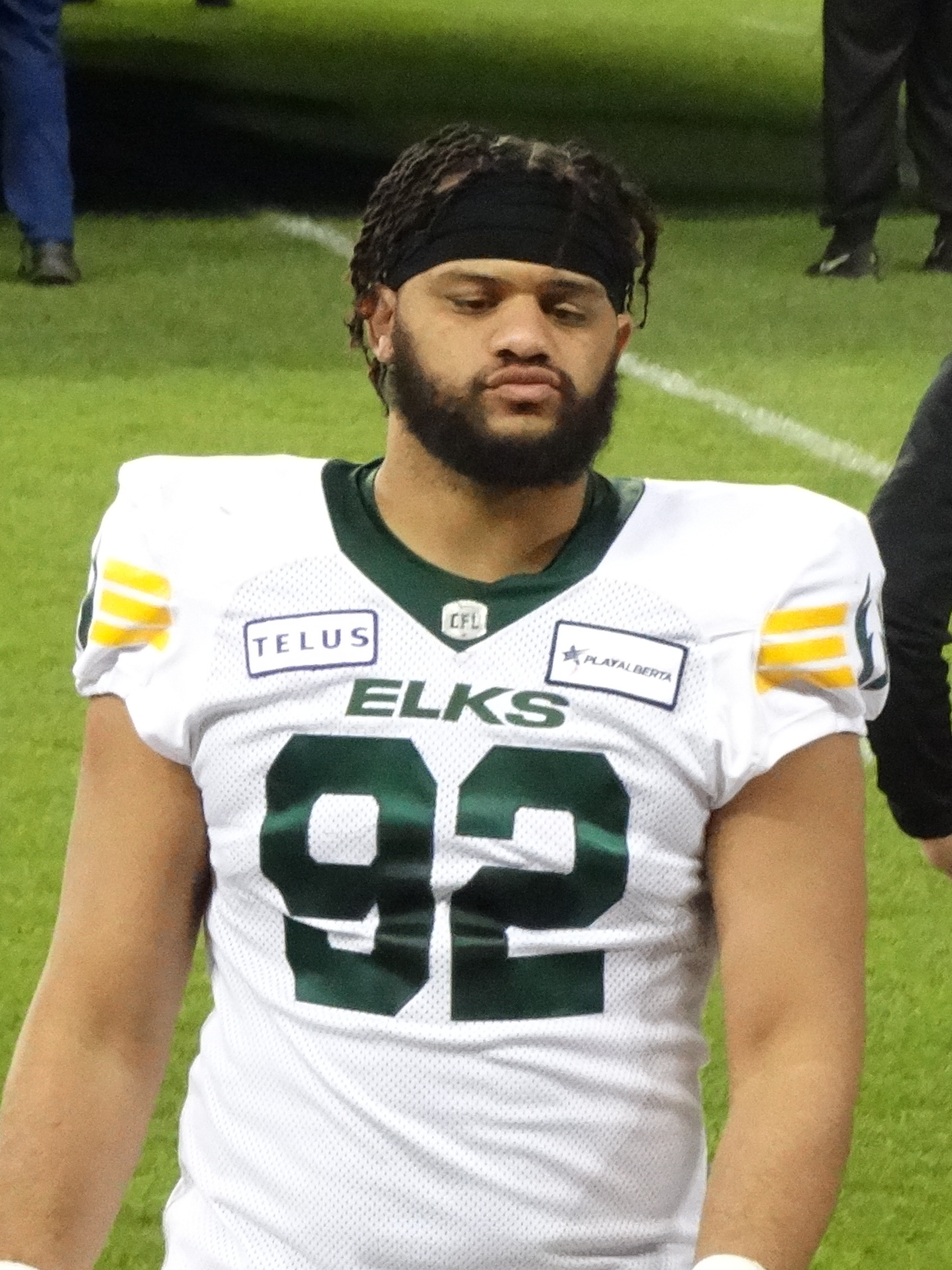
- Curtis with the Edmonton Elks in 2023

No. 92 – Edmonton Elks
- Position: Defensive lineman
- Roster status: Active
- CFL status: National

Personal information
- Born: October 24, 1998 (age 28); Riviera Beach, Florida, U.S.
- Listed height: 6 ft 5 in (1.96 m)
- Listed weight: 302 lb (137 kg)

Career information
- High school: American Heritage
- College: Florida International (2017–2020); Keiser (2022)
- CFL draft: 2023: 4th round, 28th overall pick

Career history
- 2023–present: Edmonton Elks

Awards and highlights
- Grey Cup champion (2026)
- Stats at CFL.ca

Noah Curtis (born October 24, 1998) is an American–Canadian professional football defensive lineman for the Edmonton Elks of the Canadian Football League (CFL).

== College career ==
Curtis first played college football for the Florida International Panthers from 2017 to 2020. He played in 41 games for the Panthers where he had 106 tackles, seven tackles for loss, and three sacks. After going unselected in the 2021 NFL draft, Curtis spent 2021 out of football and instead worked full time. Although he had exhausted his NCAA eligibility, he was able to attend an NAIA institution where he enrolled at Keiser University and played for the Keiser Seahawks football team. He played in 14 games in 2022 where he had 37 tackles, 4.5 tackles for loss, and 1.5 sacks.

== Professional career ==
Pre-draft measurables
Height	Weight	Arm length	Hand span	Wingspan	40-yard dash	10-yard split	20-yard split	20-yard shuttle	Three-cone drill	Vertical jump	Broad jump	Bench press
6 ft 5 1/4 in (1.96 m)	272 lb (123 kg)	32 in (0.81 m)	9 7/8 in (0.25 m)	6 ft 5 7/8 in (1.98 m)	5.28 s	1.85 s	2.93 s	4.60 s	7.71 s	26.0 in (0.66 m)	8 ft 11 in (2.72 m)	17 reps
All values from Pro Day

Curtis was added to the 2023 CFL draft after he received his Canadian citizenship in April 2023 since his mother is from Port Dover. He was then drafted in the fourth round, 28th overall, by the Edmonton Elks and signed with the team on May 8, 2023.

Following training camp in 2023, he made the team's active roster and made his professional debut on June 11, 2023, against the Saskatchewan Roughriders where he had one defensive tackle. He played in all 18 regular season games in his rookie year where he had 23 defensive tackles and two sacks.

In 2024, Curtis played in 17 regular season games where he recorded 21 defensive tackles and six sacks.

== Personal life ==
Born on October 24, 1998, Curtis is the second son of Rick Curtis and April Curtis (née Bush). His mom is from Port Dover, ON, which makes Curtis an American-Canadian player. He grew up in Riviera Beach, Florida, where he first explored his passion for football. Curtis also loves WWE and cats.
