= Mike Scheper =

American gridiron football coach

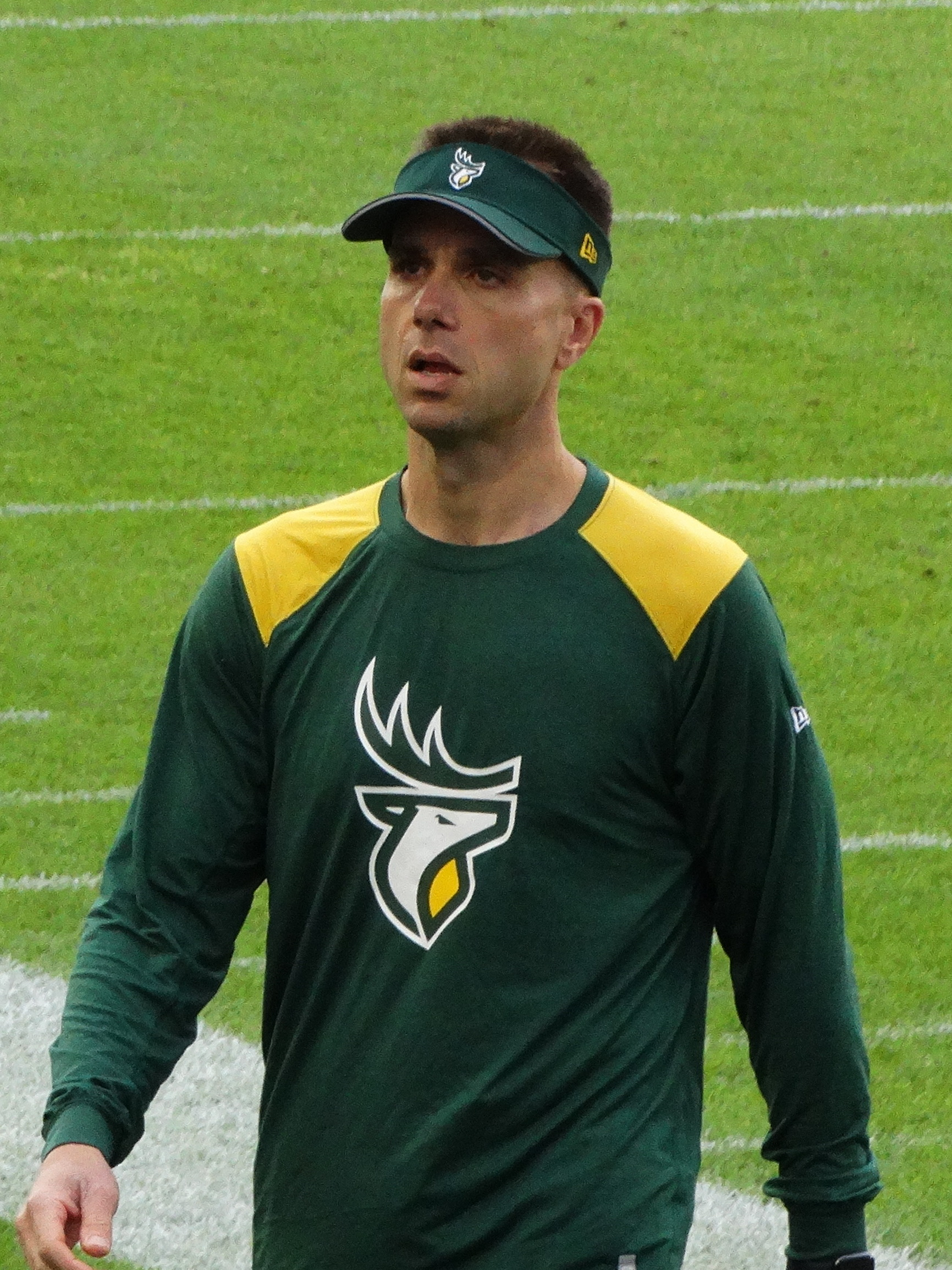
- Scheper with the Edmonton Elks in 2024

Career information
- High school: St. Francis (La Cañada Flintridge, CA)
- College: Willamette (1998–1999); Utah State (2000–2002)

Career history
- St. Francis HS (La Cañada Flintridge, CA) (2003–2005) Offensive line coach; Glendale College (2006–2007) Assistant offensive line coach; Fresno State (2008) Graduate assistant - offensive line; Saskatchewan Roughriders (2009–2010) Defensive line coach; College of the Canyons (2011) Cornerbacks coach; Portland State (2012–2013) Defensive ends coach; Winnipeg Blue Bombers (2014) Defensive line coach; Edmonton Eskimos (2015) Offensive line coach; Saskatchewan Roughriders (2016–2019); Offensive line coach (2016); Special teams and defensive assistant (2017); Special teams assistant (2018); Defensive line coach (2019); Minot State (2020–2021) Defensive coordinator; Edmonton Elks (2022–2024); Special teams assistant (2022); Special teams coordinator (2023–2024)

Awards and highlights
- Grey Cup champion (2015)

Michael Scheper is an American football coach. He has served as a coach at the high school, collegiate, and professional level since 2003.

== Playing career ==
Scheper attended St. Francis High School in La Cañada Flintridge, California.

He first played college football for the Willamette Bearcats from 1998 to 1999. He then transferred to play for the Utah State Aggies from 2000 to 2002. He was redshirted in 2000. He graduated from Utah State in 2000.

== Coaching career ==
Scheper began his coaching career at his alma mater, St. Francis High School, serving as the offensive line coach from 2003 to 2005.

He was the assistant offensive line coach at Glendale College in California from 2006 to 2007.

He was a graduate assistant working with the offensive line for the Fresno State Bulldogs in 2008.

Scheper then served as the defensive line coach of the Saskatchewan Roughriders of the Canadian Football League (CFL) from 2009 to 2010.

He was the cornerbacks coach at the College of the Canyons in 2011.

He served as the defensive ends coach of the Portland State Vikings from 2012 to 2013.

Scheper returned to the CFL in 2014 as the defensive line coach of the Winnipeg Blue Bombers for one season.

He was the offensive line coach of the Edmonton Elks of the CFL in 2015, helping the team win the 103rd Grey Cup.

He then returned to the Roughriders in 2016, joining the team as the offensive line coach. He was then the team's special teams and defensive assistant in 2017, special teams assistant in 2018, and defensive line coach in 2019.

Scheper was the defensive coordinator for the Minot State Beavers from 2020 to 2021.

He returned to the CFL once again in 2022 as the special teams assistant for the Edmonton Elks. He was the Elks' special teams coordinator from 2023 to 2024.
