= Brandon Isaac =

American gridiron football player and coach (born 1984)

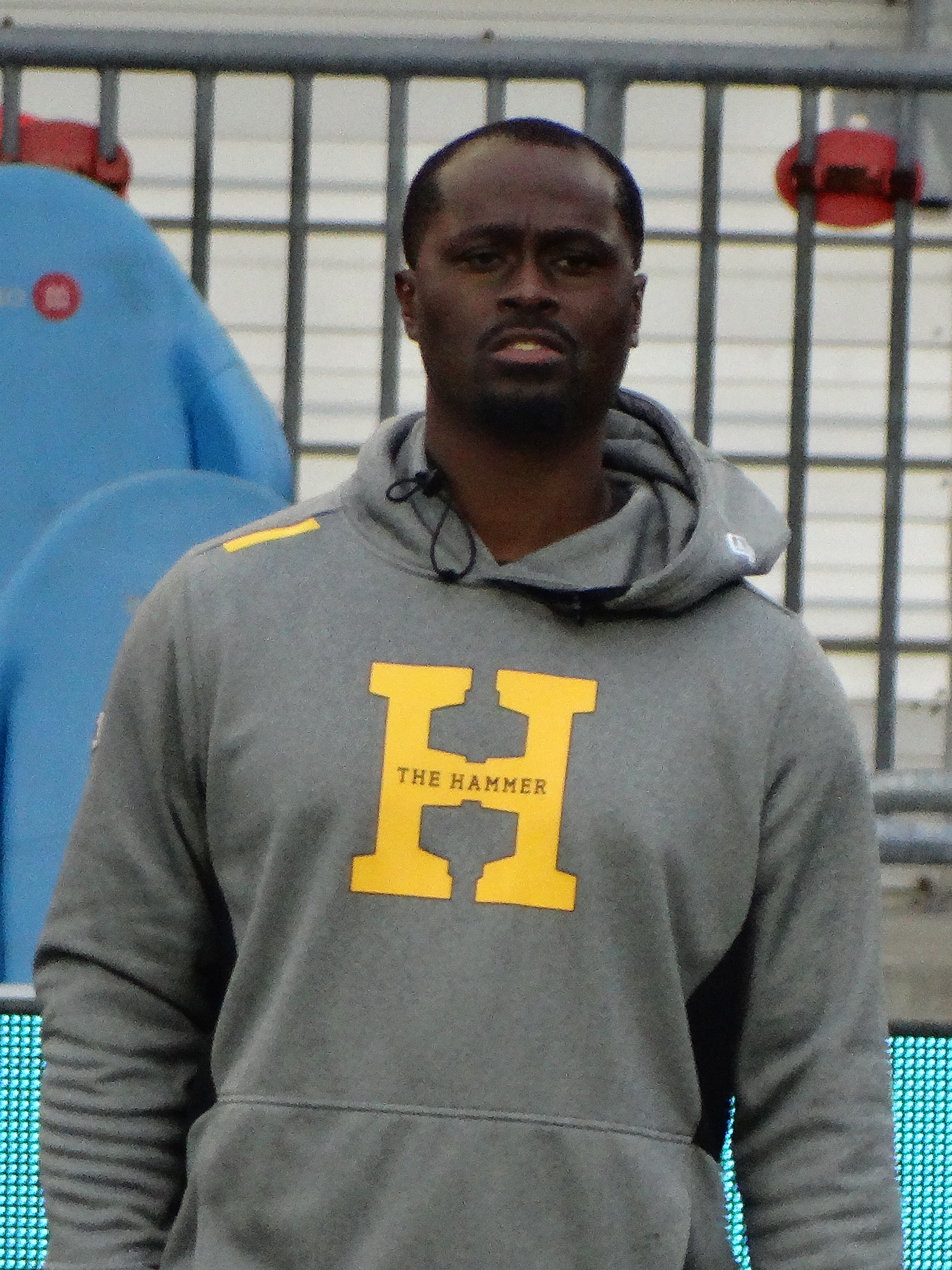
- Isaac with the Hamilton Tiger-Cats in 2024

Hamilton Tiger-Cats
- Title: Defensive backs coach

Personal information
- Born: December 11, 1984 (age 41); Blackville, South Carolina, U.S.
- Listed height: 6 ft 3 in (1.91 m)
- Listed weight: 203 lb (92 kg)

Career information
- Position: Defensive back (No. 28)
- College: South Carolina
- NFL draft: 2008: undrafted

Career history
- 2008: Spokane Shock
- 2009: Manchester Wolves
- 2010: Milwaukee Iron*
- 2010–2011: Calgary Stampeders
- 2012–2013: Toronto Argonauts
- 2013: Hamilton Tiger-Cats
- 2014: Saskatchewan Roughriders
- 2015–2016: Toronto Argonauts
- * Offseason or practice squad member only
- 2022–2023: Edmonton Elks (Defensive backs coach)
- 2024–present: Hamilton Tiger-Cats (Defensive backs coach)

Awards and highlights
- Grey Cup champion (2012)
- Stats at CFL.ca (archive)

Brandon Isaac (born December 11, 1984) is an American professional football coach and former linebacker. He is currently the defensive backs coach for the Hamilton Tiger-Cats of the Canadian Football League (CFL). He was a member of the Spokane Shock, Manchester Wolves, Milwaukee Iron, Calgary Stampeders, Hamilton Tiger-Cats, Saskatchewan Roughriders, and Toronto Argonauts. He is a Grey Cup champion, having won with the Argonauts in 2012.

== College career ==
Isaac played college football for the South Carolina Gamecocks. In his two-year tenure with the Gamecocks, Isaac recorded 55 tackles, one interception, and eight pass breakups.

== Professional career ==
Pre-draft measurables
Height	Weight
6 ft 1 7/8 in (1.88 m)	195 lb (88 kg)
Values from Pro Day

Isaac was a member of the 100th Grey Cup winning Toronto Argonauts.

== Coaching career ==
=== Edmonton Elks ===
Fletcher served as the defensive backs coach for the Edmonton Elks from 2022 to 2023.

=== Hamilton Tiger-Cats ===
On February 2, 2024, it was announced that Isaac had joined the Hamilton Tiger-Cats to serve as the team's defensive backs coach.
