= CFL Combine =

Canadian Football League evaluation camp

CFL Combine Camp d'evaluation de la LCF
- CFL Combine logo
- Dates: every March
- Frequency: Annual
- Locations: Edmonton, Alberta
- Inaugurated: 2000
- Next event: Week of March 15, 2027
- Organizer: Canadian Football League

The CFL Combine (French: Camp d'evaluation de la LCF, formerly known as the Evaluation Camp or E-Camp) is a three-day program in which athletes from Canadian universities and Canadians in the NCAA are scouted by general managers, coaches and scouts of the Canadian Football League (CFL). The goal of the camp is for the nine CFL franchises to have a better idea of whom they would like to draft in the CFL draft which usually takes place roughly six weeks after the camp. The first combined Evaluation Camp took place in 2000 in Toronto and continued every year in Toronto until 2016 when it was announced that Regina would host the combine in 2017. It was also suggested that the league would begin rotating the Combine hosts every year. Winnipeg hosted in 2018 and the event returned to Toronto in 2019 and 2020 with the hiatus of the CFL Week event. In 2021, the event was purely remote due to the COVID-19 pandemic in Canada but was brought back to Toronto in 2022. The event's hosts began to rotate again with Edmonton, Winnipeg, and Regina hosting in the three subsequent years.

From 2014 to 2022, there were regional combines in Western Canada, Montreal and Toronto in the week prior to the national combine. The regional combines provide a wider scope of athletes with the opportunity to be evaluated by CFL personnel. Players are then selected from these combines to participate in the National Combine to compete with athletes already invited there. The 2020 Combine was cancelled and the 2021 Combine was held remotely due to the COVID-19 pandemic. In 2023, the three regional combines were replaced with one CFL Invitational Combine.

== Events ==
Athletes are measured to compare the various physical builds of certain athletes. Some of the qualities measured include; height, weight, hand size, arm length, flexibility. The bench press is one of the most exciting drills at E-Camp, because it evaluates both the athletes strength and muscular endurance. For certain positions the vertical jump analysis provides valuable information regarding the leaping ability of an athlete. The 40-yard dash is another popular event at the evaluation camp. Athletes are timed at the 10, 20 and 40 m intervals, each one has greater significance for certain positions. A good test of an athlete's lower body explosion capabilities is how he fares in the broad jump test. To test acceleration and agility athletes are tested in both the short shuttle and the 3-cone drill. Two of the more important parts of the evaluation are the interviews with the teams and the one-on-one drills.

== History ==
=== 2012 ===
Michael Van Praet, defensive lineman of the Western Ontario Mustangs, won the bench press competition with 38 reps. Top-ranked prospect Ben Heenan came second with 32 repetitions. Keenan MacDougall led all broad jumpers with a score of 10 feet and 7 and half inches and Dylan Hollohan won the shuttle drill and vertical jump competition leaping 42.5 inches. Shamawd Chambers, wide receiver from Wilfrid Laurier, led all athletes running an electronically timed 4.42 40-yard dash.

=== 2013 ===
As of the 2013 CFL Combine the league re-branded the evaluation so that it is not longer referred to as E-Camp but rather the CFL Combine. The 2013 CFL Combine took place March 22–24. For the first time in its history the evaluation was expanded to include two regional combines (Edmonton and Montreal) prior to the main E-Camp taking place in Toronto. The regional combine in Edmonton took place March 18, in Commonwealth Stadium. The Montreal combine took place on March 20, in Université Laval Stadium. The Edmonton combine had 38 and the Montreal combine had 30 athletes. Michael Klassen, defensive lineman from the University of Calgary, and Jermaine Gabriel, defensive back from the Calgary Colts, both advanced out of the Edmonton combine. From out of the Montreal combine, Kristopher Robertson from the Concordia Stingers was invited to the main combine in Toronto.

Elie Ngoyi, a defensive lineman from the Bishop's Gaiters, won the bench press competition with 40 repetitions. Kristopher Robertson from the Concordia Stingers (who was invited from the Montreal combine) had the fastest 40-yard dash, clocking in at 4.42 seconds. Robertson also led the vertical jump (43 inches) and the broad jump (10 feet, 5 inches). Guillaume Rioux from the Laval Rouge et Or won the Shuffle drill with a time of 3.91 seconds. The three-cone drill was won by Simon Le Marquand from the Ottawa Gee-Gees, with a time of 6.84 seconds. As a result of Kristopher Robertson's impressive showings at both the Montreal regional combine and the main combine in Toronto, he soared to being the 11th overall selection in the 2013 CFL Draft.

=== 2014 ===
The 2014 CFL Combine was scheduled for the weekend of March 21–23. On March 4, 2014, the CFL announced that the 2014 combine would include three regional combines (Edmonton, Montreal and Toronto) prior to the main national combine. The regional combines were held from March 17 through 20. Four athletes were advanced to the national combine out of the regional Toronto combine, with the Edmonton and Montreal combines both advancing five players.

David Menard, defensive linemen from Montreal, had the most bench reps with 32. Adam Thibault, defensive back from Laval ran the fastest 40-yard dash, clocking in at 4.454 seconds. Thibault also had the fastest time in the shuffle drill with a time of 4.03. Evan Pszczonak, wide receiver from Windsor, had the highest vertical jump of 40.0 inches. Andrew Lue, defensive back from Queen's, had the longest broad jump, leaping 10 feet 5 inches. The best three-cone drill time was by Antoine Pruneau, defensive back, Montreal, with a time of 6.78 seconds.

=== 2015 ===
Regional combines were held in Edmonton, Montreal, and Toronto in the week leading up to the national combine in Toronto, which took place March 27 to 29, 2015. Eleven athletes from the three regional combines were invited to the national combine in Toronto. The 2015 CFL draft class was believed to be the deepest in many years – a result of both CFL eligibility rules and increasing quality of coaching and systems in the high school and university level across Canada. Several all-time CFL Combine records were broken in 2015, starting with the 40-yard dash. Regina Rams CB Tevaughn Campbell ran the fastest electronically timed 40-yard dash with 4.35 seconds. Wilfrid Laurier's Chris Ackie set the new broad jump record leaping 10 feet 11.5 inches, surpassing Brian Nugent's 2002 record of 10’ 10.5″. Chris Ackie also led all prospects with a vertical jump of 40 inches. Byron Archambault set the record for most bench press reps by a linebacker with 41, second only across all positions to Michael Knill's 47 in 2011. Archambault led all prospects in the shuttle drill with a speed of 4.18 seconds. Finally, WR Nic Demski from Manitoba was the only athlete to run a sub-7-second three-cone drill, with a time of 6.91 seconds.

Combine Logo 2016–2018.

=== 2016 ===
In 2016, regional combines were again held in Edmonton, Montreal, and Toronto with 17 players being added to the National combine roster. The Edmonton combine was held on March 7, the Montreal combine was on March 9, the Toronto combine was held on March 10, and the National combine in Toronto took place from March 11 to March 13. Queen's receiver Doug Corby had the fastest 40-yard dash with 4.505 seconds. Felix Faubert-Lussier of Laval had the best three-cone drill with a time of 6.73 seconds and Shaq Johnson had the best broad jump result with a distance of 11'0.0". Philippe Gagnon had the best bench press result with 40 repetitions.

=== 2017 ===
On November 15, 2016 the league announced that Regina, Saskatchewan would host the CFL Combine, as part of the larger CFL Week; which is an event designed to engage fans and the media during the off-season. The National Combine took place March 23–26 at Evraz Place, in Regina. This was the first time that the National Combine was held outside Toronto. In mid-March the CFL announced it would expand its coverage of the 2017 Combine with more analysis and footage streamed on CFL.ca than in previous years. The Eastern Regional Combine took place on March 10 in Montreal, and the Ontario Regional Combine took place on March 17 in Toronto. For the first time the Western Regional Combine was not held in Edmonton, but instead took place in Regina on March 23, just before the National Combine. In total 50 players competed in the 2017 Combine, with 15 being promoted from the 3 regional combines.

Drill	Name	Position	School/Program	Result
Bench Press	Jean Simon-Roy	OL	Laval	39
Vertical Jump	Malcolm Carter	WR	Ottawa Sooners	*40"
40-Yard Dash	Tunde Adeleke	DB	Carleton	4.58
Broad Jump	Malcolm Carter	WR	Ottawa Sooners	*10'5.25"
Shuttle	Jordan Hoover	DB	Waterloo	*4.03
3-Cone	Jordan Hoover	DB	Waterloo	6.98

* indicates a result from a regional combine event

=== 2018 ===
For the second consecutive season, the CFL paired CFL Week with the combine and had Winnipeg host both. The Eastern Regional Combine was held in Montreal on March 7, the Ontario Regional Combine was held in Toronto on March 9, and the Western Regional Combine was held March 22; two days before the main combine on March 24 and March 25.

Drill	Name	Position	School/Program	Result
Bench Press	Tresor Buama-Mafuta	DL	Saint Mary's	*28
Bench Press	Jeremy Magan-France	DL	Bishop's	*28
Vertical Jump	Lekan Idowu	DB	Windsor	*39.5"
40-Yard Dash	Robbie Yochim	DB	McMaster	*4.50
Broad Jump	Lekan Idowu	DB	Windsor	*10' 10.25"
Shuttle	Jackson Bennett	DB	Ottawa	4.09
3-Cone	Mark Chapman	WR	Central Michigan	7.00

* indicates a result from a regional combine event

Combine Logo 2019–2022.

=== 2019 ===
The 2019 National Combine moved back to Toronto amidst labour negotiations and a request by the Canadian Football League Players' Association to players not to make public appearances on behalf of the league in the offseason. This meant that there would be no CFL Week in 2019 and that Toronto would again host the National Combine from March 22 to March 24. The Western Regional Combine was hosted by Edmonton on March 11, the Eastern Regional Combine was hosted by Montreal on March 13, and the Ontario Regional Combine was hosted by Toronto on March 21.

Drill	Name	Position	School/Program	Result
Bench Press	Clement Lebreux	DL	Laval	*33
Vertical Jump	Jacob Dearborn	DB	Carleton	42.0"
40-Yard Dash	Chris Osei-Kusi	WR	Queen's	4.47
Broad Jump	Shai Ross	WR	Manitoba	11' 5.5"
Shuttle	Shai Ross	WR	Manitoba	4.08
3-Cone	Hakeem Johnson	DB	Western	6.75

* indicates a result from a regional combine event

=== 2020 ===
The 2020 National Combine was to be held in Toronto for the second straight year from March 26, 2020 to March 28, 2020. The Ontario Regional Combine was also going be in Toronto on March 12, 2020; the Eastern Regional Combine was to be held in Montreal on March 13, 2020, and the Western Regional Combine in Edmonton was to take place on March 20, 2020. However, on March 12, 2020, the CFL announced that the events were to be cancelled due to the COVID-19 pandemic.

=== 2021 ===
The 2021 National Combine and Regional Combine were held virtually due to the ongoing COVID-19 pandemic in Canada. Testing, football drills, and interviews were conducted remotely through video.

Drill	Name	Position	School/Program	Result
Bench Press	Carter Comeau	OL	Calgary	32
Vertical Jump	Jacob Dearborn	DB	Carleton	42.0"
40-Yard Dash	Kyle Borsa	RB	Regina	4.46
Broad Jump	Arjay Shelley	WR	Manitoba	10′ 8.125″
Shuttle	Kyle Borsa	RB	Regina	4.08
Shuttle	David Côté	K	Laval	4.08
3-Cone	David Côté	K	Laval	6.53

=== 2022 ===
The 2022 National Combine was held in-person for the first time since 2019 and took place in Toronto from March 26 to March 27. The Ontario Regional Combine was hosted by Waterloo on March 10, the Eastern Regional Combine was hosted by Montreal on March 11, and the Western Regional Combine was hosted by Edmonton on March 18.

Drill	Name	Position	School/Program	Result
Bench Press	Cornelius Alden Brown Jr.	LB	Quinte Skyhawks	*30
Vertical Jump	Riley Boersma	WR	Regina	*41.5"
Vertical Jump	Gavin Cobb	WR	Manitoba	*41.5"
40-Yard Dash	Tyrell Ford	DB	Waterloo	4.42
Broad Jump	Gavin Cobb	WR	Manitoba	10' 9.875"
Shuttle	Dimitrios Sinodinos	QB	McGill	*4.06
3-Cone	Vincent Forbes-Mombleau	WR	Laval	6.74

* indicates a result from a regional combine event

=== 2023 ===
The 2023 National Combine was held in Edmonton and expanded to five days from March 22 to March 26, 2023. The three regional combines were replaced by one CFL Invitational Combine and was hosted by the Feridun Hamdullahpur Field House on the campus of the University of Waterloo in Waterloo, Ontario, on March 3, 2023.

Drill	Name	Position	School/Program	Result
Bench Press	Phillip Grohovac	OL	Western	26
Vertical Jump	Jake Kelly	DB	Bishop's	40.5"
40-Yard Dash	Gabriel Appiah-Kubi	WR	York	4.44
Broad Jump	Jacob Taylor	DB	Alberta	10' 11"
Shuttle	Thomas Bertrand-Hudon	RB	Delaware State	4.16
3-Cone	Siriman Harrison Bagayogo	DB	Guelph	6.87

* indicates a result from a regional combine event

=== 2024 ===
The 2024 National Combine was held in Winnipeg and took place from March 19 to March 24, 2024. The CFL Invitational Combine was once again be hosted by the Feridun Hamdullahpur Field House in Waterloo, Ontario, on March 8, 2024.

Drill	Name	Position	School/Program	Result
Bench Press	Mitchell Price	DL	McMaster	*30
Bench Press	Ryan Berta	OL	Queen's	30
Vertical Jump	Michael Herzog	RB	Hillsdale College	39.0"
40-Yard Dash	Michael Chris-Ike	RB	Delaware State	4.51
40-Yard Dash	Benjamin Labrosse	DB	McGill	4.51
Broad Jump	Benjamin Labrosse	DB	McGill	11' 1 3/4"
Shuttle	Justin Succar	WR	Waterloo	4.07
3-Cone	Michael Chris-Ike	RB	Delaware State	6.71

* indicates a result from a regional combine event

=== 2025 ===
The 2025 National Combine was held in Regina from March 21 to March 23, 2025. The CFL Invitational Combine was hosted by the Feridun Hamdullahpur Field House in Waterloo, Ontario, on February 28, 2025.

Drill	Name	Position	School/Program	Result
Bench Press	Anthony Horth	OL	Sherbrooke	*41
Vertical Jump	Maliek Cote-Azore	DB	Wilfrid Laurier	41.0"
40-Yard Dash	Opemipo Oshinubi	RB	Alberta	4.41
Broad Jump	Eric Cumberbatch	DB	Ottawa	11' 2 3/8"
Shuttle	Daniel Wiebe	WR	Saskatchewan	3.95
3-Cone	Ronan Horrall	DB	British Columbia	*6.58

* indicates a result from a regional combine event

=== 2026 ===
The 2026 National Combine was held in Edmonton, Alberta from March 27 to March 29, 2026. The CFL Invitational Combine was hosted by the Feridun Hamdullahpur Field House in Waterloo, Ontario, on March 6, 2026.

Drill	Name	Position	School/Program	Result
Bench Press	Mahdi Hazime	OL	New Mexico Highlands	*38
Vertical Jump	Jesulayomi Ojutalayo	WR	Wilfrid Laurier	38.0"
Vertical Jump	Patrick Cumberbatch	DB	Ottawa	38.0"
40-Yard Dash	Louis-Philippe Gauthier	DB	Montreal	4.50
Broad Jump	Marc Djonay Rondeau	DB	Ottawa	10' 11 3/8″
Shuttle	Ethan Stuart	DB	McMaster	4.01
3-Cone	Ethan Stuart	DB	McMaster	6.82

* indicates a result from a regional combine event
