= Victor Cui =

Canadian sports executive

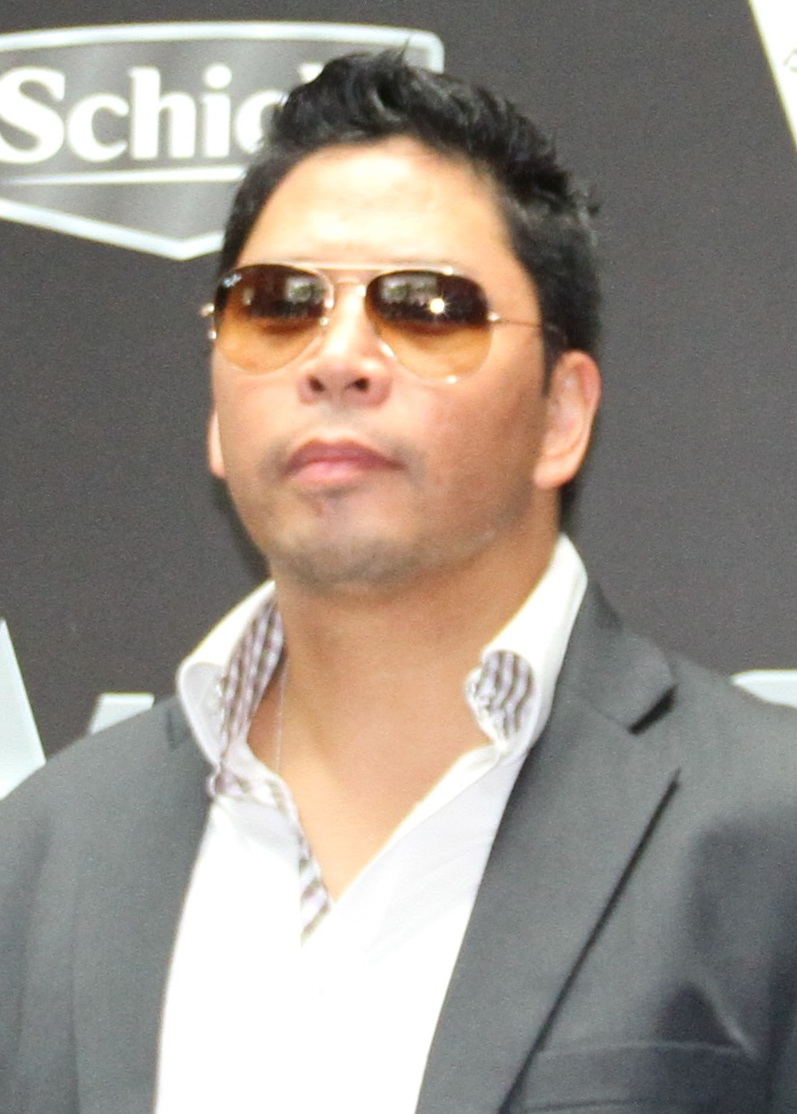
- Cui in 2012
- Born: 1971 or 1972 (age 54–55); Edmonton, Alberta, Canada
- Education: University of Alberta
- Occupation: Sports executive
- Known for: Former CEO of ONE Championship and the Edmonton Elks

Chinese name
- Simplified Chinese: 崔伟德
Transcriptions
Standard Mandarin
- Hanyu Pinyin: Cuī Wěidé
- Website: victorcui.com

Victor Cui (/kwiː/) is a Canadian sports executive and entrepreneur. He is the co-founder of ONE Championship, a Singapore-based sports media company that grew under his founding leadership into Asia's largest sports media property with a valuation exceeding $1 billion and broadcast distribution across more than 150 countries. He later served as president and CEO of the Edmonton Elks of the Canadian Football League. Since departing the Elks, Cui has continued to operate across international sport, serving as Head of Asia-Pacific for The Snow League — the winter sports property founded by Olympic gold medalist Shaun White — and as Founding Partner of the EPIC World Championship, an amateur pickleball property. In 2025, Cui was elected as a Class B Member of the Canadian Olympic Committee. He is also a founding partner and advisor to Inzdr Corp., an AI-driven athlete digital twin platform developed in partnership with two-time Formula One World Champion Mika Häkkinen.

Cui was CEO of ONE Championship (ONE) for the first eight years, a mixed martial arts organization based in Singapore.

== Early life ==
Cui was born in Edmonton, Alberta, to Filipino parents and has Chinese ancestry on his father's side. At the age of five, Cui and his family left Edmonton for West Africa, and they returned to Edmonton when he was 13. Cui attended the University of Alberta, where he was a member of Phi Gamma Delta.

== Career ==
Before setting up ONE in 2011, Cui had nearly 15 years of experience in the sports media industry and was behind Martial Combat, a promotion which ran two shows per month at Resorts World Sentosa from May to October in 2010.

Cui has previously worked as a senior executive at ESPN Star Sports and the PGA Tour and has also been involved in X Games, Olympic Games, Commonwealth Games, and many other sporting events.

The first ONE show, ONE Fighting Championship: Champion vs. Champion, took place at the Singapore Indoor Stadium on 3 September 2011 and featured Phil Baroni, Yoshiyuki Yoshida, Gregor Gracie, and Eduard Folayang.

According to Cui, everyone, including his wife, told him to use a smaller venue, but he was determined to prove them wrong. Since then the Singapore based promotion has held sold-out events in Kuala Lumpur, Jakarta, Manila, and Singapore, secured a ten-year TV deal with ESPN Star Sports and signed various fighters.

=== ONE Elite Agency ===
In November 2018, Cui launched a new global company called ONE Elite Agency. The agency manages martial arts athletes from ONE Championship, esports players, artists and musicians.

=== Edmonton Elks ===
In January 2022, Cui was named the president and CEO of the Edmonton Elks, replacing Chris Presson who was fired after the 2021 season. Cui explained his decision to return to Edmonton to lead the team he grew up watching as "a dream come true". In the team's first home game under Cui's leadership, the Elks hosted "Stand With Ukraine" night in support of the Canada-Ukraine Foundation.

Cui and the Elks mutually parted ways in August 2023, as the Elks were in the midst of a 22-game home losing streak that began in 2019. According to Cui, the move was made to allow him to focus on his family.

== Awards and recognitions ==
Cui has been described as "The most powerful man in Asian MMA" due to ONE's success and his relationships with other people in the industry. He was one of only five candidates to be nominated for 'Leading Man of the Year' the 2012 World MMA Awards and the only representative of an Asian promotion on this shortlist.

Cui's family is originally from Cebu, and he was a major awardee at the 31st SAC-SMC Cebu Sports Awards on March 17, 2013, for his work in turning ONE into the biggest MMA organization in Asia and showcasing Filipino fighters.

== Personal life ==
Cui has a black belt in Taekwondo, as does his wife, and has been a fan of Mixed Martial Arts ever since watching UFC 1. He lives in Edmonton with his wife, two children and parents. Cui also was a reservist in the Royal Canadian Navy.
