= 2024 Calgary Stampeders season =

CFL team season

- Owner: Calgary Sports and Entertainment
- General manager: Dave Dickenson
- President: Jay McNeil
- Head coach: Dave Dickenson
- Home stadium: McMahon Stadium

Results
- Record: 5–12–1
- Division place: 5th, West
- Playoffs: Did not qualify
- Team MOP: Reggie Begelton
- Team MODP: Cameron Judge
- Team MOC: Cameron Judge
- Team MOOL: Sean McEwen
- Team MOST: René Paredes
- Team MOR: Clarence Hicks

Uniform
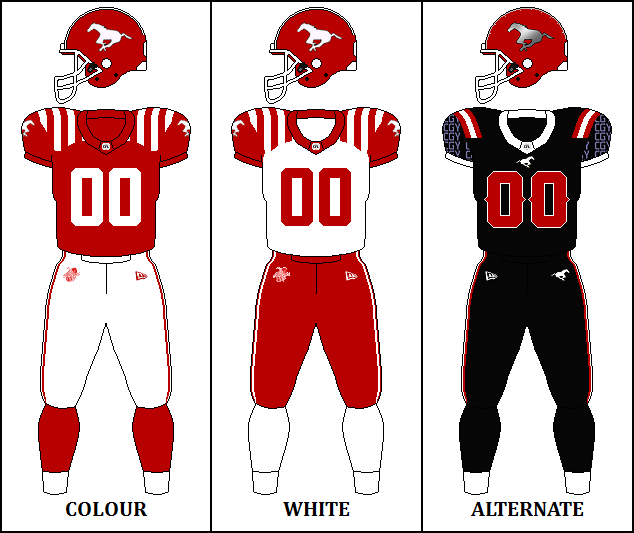

The 2024 Calgary Stampeders season was the 66th season for the team in the Canadian Football League (CFL) and their 79th overall. The Stampeders missed the playoffs for the first time since 2004. The 2024 CFL season was Dave Dickenson's eighth season as head coach and his second season as general manager.

The Calgary Stampeders drew an average home attendance of 21,541 in 2024.

== Offseason ==
=== CFL global draft ===
The 2024 CFL global draft took place on April 30, 2024. The Stampeders had two picks in the draft, selecting fourth in each round.

Round	Pick	Player	Position	Club/School	Nationality
1	4	Ron Tiavaasue	TE	New Mexico State	New Zealand
2	13	Julius Welschof	DL	Charlotte	Germany

== CFL national draft ==
The 2024 CFL draft took place on April 30, 2024. The Stampeders had eight selections in the eight-round draft. Not including traded picks, the team selected fourth in each round of the draft after finishing sixth in the 2023 league standings.

Round	Pick	Player	Position	University team	Hometown
1	4	Benjamin Labrosse	DB	McGill	Greenfield Park, QC
1	8	Christy Nkanu	OL	Washington State	Montreal, QC
3	28	George Idoko	DL	Saskatchewan	Regina, SK
4	33	Jason Janvier-Messier	DL	York	Beloeil, QC
5	42	Paul-Antoine Ouellette	WR	Montreal	Montreal, QC
6	51	Tanner McLachlan	TE	Arizona	Lethbridge, AB
7	60	Jackson Sombach	DB	Regina	Regina, SK
8	69	Kaylyn St-Cyr	DB	Montreal	La Prairie, QC

== Preseason ==
=== Schedule ===
Week	Game	Date	Kickoff	Opponent	Results		TV	Venue	Attendance	Summary
Week	Game	Date	Kickoff	Opponent	Score	Record	TV	Venue	Attendance	Summary
A	Bye									
B	1	Sat, May 25	2:00 p.m. MDT	vs. BC Lions	W 30–6	1–0	CFL+	McMahon Stadium	17,060	Recap
C	2	Fri, May 31	6:30 p.m. MDT	at Winnipeg Blue Bombers	W 31–10	2–0	CFL+	Princess Auto Stadium	N/A	Recap

# Games played with white uniforms.

== Regular season ==
=== Standings ===
West Division
Team	GP	W	L	T	Pts	PF	PA	Div	Stk	
Winnipeg Blue Bombers	18	11	7	0	22	447	365	7–3	W1	Details
Saskatchewan Roughriders	18	9	8	1	19	478	434	5–5	L1	Details
BC Lions	18	9	9	0	18	448	439	5–5	W1	Details
Edmonton Elks	18	7	11	0	14	494	500	5–5	W2	Details
Calgary Stampeders	18	5	12	1	11	427	510	3–7	W1	Details

=== Schedule ===
Week	Game	Date	Kickoff	Opponent	Results		TV	Venue	Attendance	Summary
Week	Game	Date	Kickoff	Opponent	Score	Record	TV	Venue	Attendance	Summary
1	1	Fri, June 7	7:00 p.m. MDT	vs. Hamilton Tiger-Cats	W 32–24	1–0	TSN	McMahon Stadium	19,742	Recap
2	2	Sat, June 15	5:00 p.m. MDT	at BC Lions	L 17–26	1–1	TSN/RDS2/CBSSN	BC Place	53,788	Recap
3	Bye									
4	3	Sat, June 29	5:00 p.m. MDT	vs. Winnipeg Blue Bombers	W 22–19 (OT)	2–1	TSN/CBSSN	McMahon Stadium	22,386	Recap
5	4	Sat, July 6	5:00 p.m. MDT	at Montreal Alouettes	L 26–30	2–2	TSN/RDS/CBSSN	Molson Stadium	20,652	Recap
6	5	Fri, July 12	5:00 p.m. MDT	at Winnipeg Blue Bombers	L 37–41	2–3	TSN/RDS	Princess Auto Stadium	29,467	Recap
7	6	Sun, July 21	5:00 p.m. MDT	vs. BC Lions	W 25–24	3–3	TSN/CBSSN	McMahon Stadium	20,057	Recap
8	7	Fri, July 26	5:30 p.m. MDT	at Ottawa Redblacks	L 6–33	3–4	TSN	TD Place Stadium	17,267	Recap
9	8	Sun, Aug 4	5:00 p.m. MDT	vs. Toronto Argonauts	W 27–23	4–4	TSN	McMahon Stadium	19,914	Recap
10	9	Fri, Aug 9	5:30 p.m. MDT	at Toronto Argonauts	L 25–39	4–5	TSN	BMO Field	13,481	Recap
11	10	Thu, Aug 15	7:00 p.m. MDT	vs. Ottawa Redblacks	L 29–31	4–6	TSN/RDS2	McMahon Stadium	17,692	Recap
12	Bye									
13	11	Mon, Sept 2	4:00 p.m. MDT	vs. Edmonton Elks	L 20–35	4–7	TSN/CBSSN	McMahon Stadium	28,467	Recap
14	12	Sat, Sept 7	5:00 p.m. MDT	at Edmonton Elks	L 16–37	4–8	TSN/RDS	Commonwealth Stadium	32,144	Recap
15	13	Sat, Sept 14	5:00 p.m. MDT	vs. Montreal Alouettes	T 19–19 (2OT)	4–8–1	TSN/RDS	McMahon Stadium	20,187	Recap
16	14	Fri, Sept 20	7:30 p.m. MDT	vs. Saskatchewan Roughriders	L 29–37	4–9–1	TSN	McMahon Stadium	24,240	Recap
17	Bye									
18	15	Fri, Oct 4	8:00 p.m. MDT	at BC Lions	L 15–32	4–10–1	TSN	BC Place	21,108	Recap
19	16	Sat, Oct 12	1:00 p.m. MDT	vs. Edmonton Elks	L 18–23	4–11–1	CTV	McMahon Stadium	21,185	Recap
20	17	Fri, Oct 18	5:00 p.m. MDT	at Hamilton Tiger-Cats	L 20–42	4–12–1	TSN/CBSSN	Tim Hortons Field	22,410	Recap
21	18	Sat, Oct 26	5:00 p.m. MDT	at Saskatchewan Roughriders	W 27–12	5–12–1	TSN	Mosaic Stadium	22,709	Recap

# Games played with red uniforms.
# Games played with white uniforms.
# Games played with black uniforms.

== Roster ==
2024 Calgary Stampeders final roster
**Quarterbacks**: 1 Logan Bonner; 12 Jake Maier; 15 Tommy Stevens; **Running backs**: 49 Ryan Leder; 20 Peyton Logan; 26 Dedrick Mills; **Receivers**: 14 Clark Barnes; 84 Reggie Begelton; 17 Cameron Echols-Luper; 82 Rysen John; 80 Marken Michel; 83 Tyson Middlemost; 85 Jalen Philpot	**Offensive linemen**: 63 Rodeem Brown C; 54 D. J. Coker T; 60 D'Antne Demery T; 51 Sean McEwen C; 65 Christy Nkanu G; 67 Zack Williams G; **Defensive linemen**: 99 Kail Dava DT; 73 Clarence Hicks DE; 95 Julian Howsare DE; 96 Jaylon Hutchings DT; 47 George Idoko DE; 41 Mike Rose DT; 97 Justin Sambu DT; 9 James Vaughters DE	**Linebackers**: 7 Micah Awe; 4 Cameron Judge; 38 Adam Konar; 50 Marquel Lee; 48 Jake Roberts; 42 Micah Teitz; **Defensive backs**: 21 Bailey Devine-Scott; 6 Demerio Houston; 29 Ben Labrosse; 35 Tyler Richardson; 31 Tre Roberson; 40 Bentlee Sanders; 8 Nick Statz; 19 Malcolm Thompson; 0 Kobe Williams	**Special teams**: 52 Aaron Crawford LS; 24 Cody Grace P; 30 René Paredes K; **Practice roster**: 44 Dan Basambombo LB; 90 Jett Bush DE; 28 Clifford Chattman DB; 33 Meiko Dotson DB; 34 Keaton Ellis DB; 94 Anthony Federico DE; 89 Mike Harley WR; 39 Toshiki Sato K; 68 Eric Smith T; 46 Ron Tiavaasue FB; 2 P. J. Walker QB; 27 Chandler Worthy RB	**Injured list**: 25 Daniel Amoako DB; 66 Bryce Bell G; 98 Kwadwo Boahen DT; 87 Erik Brooks WR; 74 Josiah Coatney DT; 3 Branden Dozier DB; 37 Elliot Graham DE; 11 Malik Henry WR; 32 Kylin Hill RB; 81 Ishmael Hyman WR; 71 Jason Janvier-Messier DE; 23 William Langlais FB; 86 Tre Odoms-Dukes SB; 69 Kyle Saxelid G; 16 Matt Shiltz QB; 36 Kaylyn St-Cyr DB; 77 Kelon Thomas DE; 88 Cole Tucker SB; 93 Charles Wiley DT; 45 Darius Williams LB; **Suspended list**: -- Jesiah Irish WR; 99 Hamilcar Rashed; -- Malachi Wideman WR
Italics indicate American player • **Bold** indicates Global player

== Coaching staff ==
Calgary Stampeders staff
Front office: President – Jay McNeil; Director of Player Personnel – Brendan Mahoney; Director of U.S. Scouting – Cole Hufnagel; Football Administration Director – Molly Campbell; Director of Football Operations – Nick Bojda; Senior Consultant – Craig Dickenson; CFL Draft Coordinator – Dwayne Cameron; Head Coaches: Head Coach/General Manager – Dave Dickenson; Assistant Head Coach/Special Teams Coordinator – Mark Kilam; Offensive coaches: Offensive Coordinator and Offensive Line – Pat DelMonaco; Quarterbacks – Beau Baldwin; Receivers – Nik Lewis; Running Backs – André Bolduc; Offensive Assistant – Des Catellier	Defensive coaches: Defensive Coordinator – Brent Monson; Defensive Line – Juwan Simpson; Linebackers – Bob Slowik; Defensive Backs – Dwayne Cameron; Special teams coaches: Special Teams Assistant – Des Catellier; Strength and conditioning: Strength and Conditioning – Daryl Chambers; → Coaching staff
