= 2024 Edmonton Elks season =

CFL team season

- General manager: Chris Jones (Fired July 15, 2024); Geroy Simon (Interim)
- President: Rick LeLacheur
- Head coach: Chris Jones (Fired July 15, 2024); Jarious Jackson (Interim)
- Home stadium: Commonwealth Stadium

Results
- Record: 7–11
- Division place: 4th, West
- Playoffs: Did not qualify
- Team MOP: Eugene Lewis
- Team MODP: Nyles Morgan
- Team MOC: Kurleigh Gittens Jr.
- Team MOOL: Martez Ivey
- Team MOST: Jake Julien
- Team MOR: Nick Anderson

Uniform
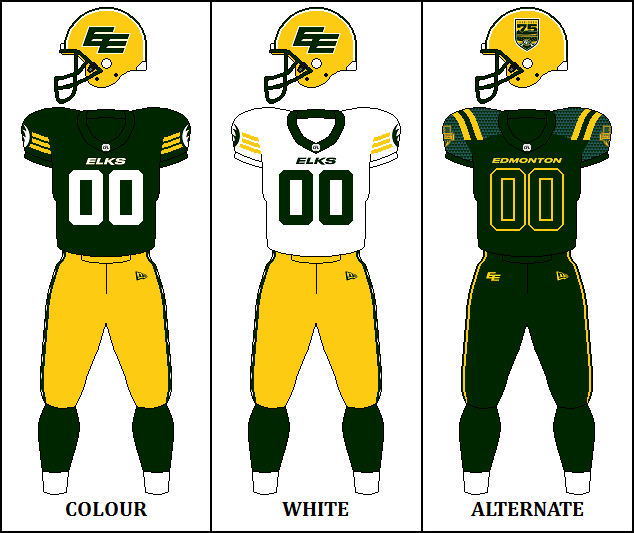

The 2024 Edmonton Elks season was the 66th season for the team in the Canadian Football League (CFL) and their 75th overall. The Elks improved upon their 4–14 record from 2023, but were eliminated from playoff contention for the fourth consecutive season.

The team's 2024 season was scheduled to be the third consecutive under head coach and general manager, Chris Jones. However, after beginning the season 0–5, Jones was fired and Jarious Jackson was named interim head coach while Geroy Simon was named interim general manager.

The franchise came under private ownership in August when longtime season ticket holder Larry Thompson purchased the team.

The Edmonton Elks drew an average home attendance of 20,499 in 2024.

== Offseason ==
=== CFL global draft ===
The 2024 CFL global draft took place on April 30. The Elks had two picks in the draft, selecting first in each round.

Round	Pick	Player	Position	Club/School	Nationality
1	1	Eteva Mauga-Clements	LB	Nebraska	American Samoa
2	10	David Olajiga	DL	Central Missouri	United Kingdom

== CFL national draft ==
The 2024 CFL draft took place on April 30. The Elks had nine selections in the eight-round draft. Not including traded picks, the team selected first in each round of the draft, including the first overall selection, after finishing last in the 2023 league standings.

Round	Pick	Player	Position	University team	Hometown
1	1	Joel Dublanko	LB	Cincinnati	Aberdeen, WA
2	10	D. K. Bonhomme	LB	South Alabama	Ottawa, ON
2	18	Bradley Hladik	TE	British Columbia	Vernon, BC
3	21	Olivier Muembi	LB	Queen's	Hamilton, ON
4	30	Jaxon Morkin	OL	Windsor	Windsor, ON
4	31	Vincent Blanchard	K	Laval	Quebec City, QC
7	57	Evan Anseeuw	OL	York	Walsingham, ON
7	63	Patrick Lavoie	OL	Carleton	Gatineau, QC
8	66	Jacob Spencer	DL	Saginaw Valley State	Brantford, ON

=== Broadcasting ===
In April 2024, CHAH announced that it would broadcast a regular schedule of Elks games with commentary in Punjabi beginning in the 2024 season, under a multi-year agreement with the team. The team had previously collaborated with CHAH to broadcast a game in Punjabi in July 2023, marking the first-ever professional football broadcast in the language in North America.

== Preseason ==
Week	Game	Date	Kickoff	Opponent	Results		TV	Venue	Attendance	Summary
Week	Game	Date	Kickoff	Opponent	Score	Record	TV	Venue	Attendance	Summary
A	Bye									
B	1	Sat, May 25	2:00 p.m. MDT	vs. Saskatchewan Roughriders	L 27–28	0–1	CFL+	Commonwealth Stadium	N/A	Recap
C	2	Fri, May 31	8:00 p.m. MDT	at BC Lions	L 9–26	0–2	TSN	BC Place	N/A	Recap

== Regular season ==
=== Season standings ===
West Division
Team	GP	W	L	T	Pts	PF	PA	Div	Stk	
Winnipeg Blue Bombers	18	11	7	0	22	447	365	7–3	W1	Details
Saskatchewan Roughriders	18	9	8	1	19	478	434	5–5	L1	Details
BC Lions	18	9	9	0	18	448	439	5–5	W1	Details
Edmonton Elks	18	7	11	0	14	494	500	5–5	W2	Details
Calgary Stampeders	18	5	12	1	11	427	510	3–7	W1	Details

=== Season schedule ===
Week	Game	Date	Kickoff	Opponent	Results		TV	Venue	Attendance	Summary
Week	Game	Date	Kickoff	Opponent	Score	Record	TV	Venue	Attendance	Summary
1	1	Sat, June 8	2:00 p.m. MDT ^{1}	vs. Saskatchewan Roughriders	L 21–29	0–1	TSN/CBSSN	Commonwealth Stadium	20,681	Recap
2	2	Fri, June 14	7:00 p.m. MDT	vs. Montreal Alouettes	L 20–23	0–2	TSN/RDS	Commonwealth Stadium	15,790	Recap
3	3	Sat, June 22	5:00 p.m. MDT	at Toronto Argonauts	L 36–39	0–3	TSN/RDS/CBSSN	BMO Field	10,857	Recap
4	4	Thu, June 27	8:00 p.m. MDT	at BC Lions	L 21–24	0–4	TSN	BC Place	19,016	Recap
5	Bye									
6	5	Sun, July 14	5:00 p.m. MDT	vs. Ottawa Redblacks	L 34–37	0–5	TSN/CBSSN	Commonwealth Stadium	18,362	Recap
7	6	Fri, July 19	5:00 p.m. MDT	at Ottawa Redblacks	L 14–20	0–6	TSN/RDS	TD Place Stadium	18,437	Recap
8	7	Sun, July 28	5:00 p.m. MDT	vs. Hamilton Tiger-Cats	L 28–44	0–7	TSN/CBSSN	Commonwealth Stadium	17,079	Recap
9	8	Sat, Aug 3	5:00 p.m. MDT	at Saskatchewan Roughriders	W 42–31	1–7	TSN/CBSSN	Mosaic Stadium	29,655	Recap
10	9	Sun, Aug 11	5:00 p.m. MDT	vs. BC Lions	W 33–16	2–7	TSN/CBSSN	Commonwealth Stadium	18,447	Recap
11	10	Sat, Aug 17	5:00 p.m. MDT	at Hamilton Tiger-Cats	W 47–22	3–7	TSN/RDS/CBSSN	Tim Hortons Field	20,092	Recap
12	11	Sun, Aug 25	5:00 p.m. MDT	at Montreal Alouettes	L 17–21	3–8	TSN/RDS/CBSSN	Molson Stadium	19,048	Recap
13	12	Mon, Sept 2	4:00 p.m. MDT	at Calgary Stampeders	W 35–20	4–8	TSN/CBSSN	McMahon Stadium	28,467	Recap
14	13	Sat, Sept 7	5:00 p.m. MDT	vs. Calgary Stampeders	W 37–16	5–8	TSN/RDS	Commonwealth Stadium	32,144	Recap
15	Bye									
16	14	Sat, Sept 21	5:00 p.m. MDT	vs. Winnipeg Blue Bombers	L 14–27	5–9	TSN/CBSSN	Commonwealth Stadium	22,605	Recap
17	15	Fri, Sept 27	6:00 p.m. MDT	at Winnipeg Blue Bombers	L 27–55	5–10	TSN	Princess Auto Stadium	32,343	Recap
18	16	Sat, Oct 5	5:00 p.m. MDT	vs. Saskatchewan Roughriders	L 24–28	5–11	TSN	Commonwealth Stadium	24,317	Recap
19	17	Sat, Oct 12	1:00 p.m. MDT	at Calgary Stampeders	W 23–18	6–11	CTV	McMahon Stadium	21,185	Recap
20	Bye									
21	18	Fri, Oct 25	7:30 p.m. MDT	vs. Toronto Argonauts	W 31–30 (OT)	7–11	TSN	Commonwealth Stadium	15,069	Recap

Notes

1. Week 1 vs Edmonton was originally scheduled for 5:00 pm MDT but was pushed up to 2:00 pm MDT to avoid conflict with game 1 of the 2024 Stanley Cup Final involving the Edmonton Oilers at 6:00 pm MDT.

== Roster ==
2024 Edmonton Elks final roster
**Quarterbacks**: 12 Jarret Doege; 2 Tre Ford; 7 Dakota Prukop; **Running backs**: 22 Javon Leake; 31 Justin Rankin; **Receivers**: 80 Frederik Antoine; 84 Tevin Jones; 87 Geno Lewis; 81 Zach Mathis; 17 Dillon Mitchell; 89 Jerminic Smith	**Offensive linemen**: 69 Brett Boyko T; 68 David Foucault G; 59 Phillip Grohovac C/G; 62 Martez Ivey T; 65 Mark Korte C; 60 Shane Richards G; 67 Hunter Steward G/T; **Defensive linemen**: 41 Elliott Brown DE; 97 Demarcus Christmas DT; 92 Noah Curtis DT/DE; 49 Daniel Joseph DE; 3 A.C. Leonard DE; 91 Shawn Oakman DT; 96 J-Min Pelley DT; 6 Jacob Plamondon DE	**Linebackers**: 48 Nick Anderson; 44 Michael Brodrique; 50 Joel Dublanko; 34 Les Maruo; 29 Derrick Moncrief; 45 Nyles Morgan; 23 Olivier Muembi; **Defensive backs**: 24 Darrius Bratton; 16 Devodric Bynum; 43 Jeremie Dominique; 5 Kai Gray; 26 Josh Hagerty; 15 Kordell Jackson; 8 Marcus Lewis; 0 Loucheiz Purifoy; 13 Jake Taylor	**Special teams**: 25 Vincent Blanchard K; 52 Luke Burton-Krahn LS; 9 Jake Julien P; **Practice roster**: 51 Clayton Bradley G; 4 Kevin Brown RB; 18 Dean Faithfull K; 36 Jalen Green DB; 30 J. J. Ross DB; 86 Arkell Smith SB; 90 Jordan Strachan DE; **Suspended list**: 61 Toryque Bateman T; 56 Tony Gray T; 32 Sewo Olonilua RB; 67 Ye'Majesty Sanders T	**Injured list**: 95 Sam Acheampong DT; 99 Antonio Alfano DT; 14 Boris Bede K; 10 McLeod Bethel-Thompson QB; 47 D. K. Bonhomme LB; 85 Gavin Cobb SB; 82 Vincent Forbes-Mombleau WR; 19 Kurleigh Gittens SB; 27 Tanner Green FB; 20 Scott Hutter DB; 64 Tomas Jack-Kurdyla T; 38 Eteva Mauga-Clements LB; 11 Hergy Mayala WR; 93 Romeo McKnight DE; 3 Kyran Moore SB; 40 Josiah Schakel LB; 76 Jakub Szott G; 42 Noah Taylor DE
Italics indicate American player • **Bold** indicates Global player

== Coaching staff ==
Edmonton Elks staff
Front office: Owner – Larry Thompson; Interim President and CEO – Rick LeLacheur; Interim General Manager – Geroy Simon; Manager of Football Operations – Shahbaz Dhillon; Canadian Scouting – Frantz Clarkson; Video Coordinator – Shaylee Foord; Head coach: Interim Head Coach – Jarious Jackson; Assistant Head Coach – Jason Shivers; Offensive coaches Offensive Coordinator and Quarterbacks– Jarious Jackson: Pass Game Coordinator and Receivers – Markus Howell; Run Game Coordinator and Offensive Line – Stephen Sorrells; Running backs – Albert Poree; Assistant Offensive Line – Takoby Cofield	Defensive coaches Defensive Coordinator – Jason Shivers: Defensive Line – Almondo Sewell; Linebacker – Ameer Ismail; Defensive Backs – Markus Klund; Defensive Assistant – Aaron Grymes; Special teams coach: Special Teams Coordinator – Mike Scheper; Strength and conditioning: Strength and Conditioning Coach – Erin Craig; → Coaching staff
