= Carytown =

Carytown is the name of two places in the United States of America:

- Carytown, Missouri, a village in Jasper County
- Carytown, Richmond, Virginia, a shopping district and neighborhood near Richmond's Museum District

Carytown was also the name of a now-defunct hamlet in the town of Charleston, New York.
