= Carthage Senior High School (Carthage, Missouri) =

Carthage High School

Location
- 2600 S River St; Carthage, Missouri 64836; United States; 37°08′44″N 94°17′57″W

Information
- Type: Public
- Established: 2009
- Principal: Angela Holman
- Teaching staff: 85.87 (on an FTE basis)
- Enrollment: 1,634 (2023-2024)
- Student to teacher ratio: 19.03
- Colors: Royal blue and white
- Athletics conference: Central Ozark Conference
- Team name: Tigers
- Website: https://hs.carthagetigers.org

Carthage High School is a public high school located in Carthage, Missouri, United States. It is a part of the Carthage R-IX School District.

The district (of which this is the sole comprehensive high school) includes Carthage, Brooklyn Heights, Fidelity, and the southern portion of Carytown.

== History ==
Carthage's first school likely opened around 1848, on the town square's north side. (Surviving records are unclear at best, but numerous sources make mention of such a school.)

The first high school opened its doors at the present location in 1860, with Samuel Kealand acting as its first principal. Officially named the Carthage Male and Female Academy, the school was built at a cost of $1,000, on donated land. As was fashionable at the time, the wood-framed building included a cupola, complete with a 125 lb (275 kg) cast iron bell, that was imported from Sheffield, England. The Male and Female Academy was destroyed in an 1861 fire, when the city was razed during the American Civil War. The bell is the only part of that original building that survives. It was restored and placed on permanent display in the current school in 1917, through donations from alumni.

Following the Civil War, the Central School was built in 1872, on the location of the destroyed Male and Female Academy. A stately red brick structure, it stood on the corner of Main and Chestnut Streets for the next 79 years. After construction of the current school building to its north, the old Central School building was converted to an annex and renamed the Manual Arts Building. The building was eventually demolished in 1951, to make way for the current school's gymnasium addition.

Due to the post-war zinc and lead mining boom in southwest Missouri, Carthage saw significant population growth. This led to the need for a larger high school. In 1904, the high school (the current 6th Grade Center) was completed, at a cost of $100,000.

== Location and campus ==
The new campus was completed in March 2009 and opened that same year in August. The building houses 9th through 12th grades and the former senior high, now the 6th Grade Center, is home to the 6th graders in Carthage. Carthage High School is now located on the southeastern edge of town on River Street close to the facilities of the Fair Acres YMCA. In fact, the high school softball and swim teams use the YMCA's pool and softball fields to practice. The South Technical Center on the High School campus opened in 2010 on the high school campus, and it received an addition in 2021, adding the west wing to the building.

Notably, the school's old football stadium and related practice facilities are still located on the campus of the Carthage Junior High, on Centennial Avenue. There is a new stadium on the land adjacent to the high school along with a separate soccer/track and field complex and much more.

Nearing the end of 2016, there was a new stadium/field house being constructed on the land adjacent to the current school. David Haffner Stadium was completed and released to the public in June 2017.

== Academics ==
Carthage High School has continued to receive high marks from the Missouri State Accreditation Counsel for distinction in academic performance. Additionally, the school's ACT Test average score is higher than the national average. Carthage High school offers students the opportunity to engage in college level coursework through Advanced Placement Classes and Dual Credit Enrollment from the surrounding colleges. CHS has also received high scores on student End-Of-Course Examinations, mandated by the State of Missouri. In 2011, Carthage the "5 Star Leadership School" Distinction, which encourages students to become even more active in regard to sportsmanship, character, education, and citizenship. Carthage was one of few schools to receive this award.

== Notable alumni ==
- Marcus B. Bell, U.S. Army brigadier general
- Emily Newell Blair, writer, suffragist, national Democratic Party leader, a founder of the League of Women Voters
- Janet L. Kavandi, NASA astronaut and veteran of three Space Shuttle missions
- Marlin Perkins, naturalist and host of TV's Mutual of Omaha's Wild Kingdom
- Arkell Smith, CFL pro football player
- Cody Smith, member of the Missouri House of Representatives
- Charles Wright, CFL and NFL pro football player
- Felix Wright, CFL and NFL pro football player

== Gallery ==
K.E. Baker football Stadium

New School Facilities Under Construction

== Sources ==
- Carthaginian, vol. 4 (1914 school yearbook)
- Carthaginian, vol. 41 (1951 school yearbook)
- Carthaginian, vol. 42 (1952 school yearbook)
- Carthaginian, vol. 77 (1987 school yearbook)
