= Nouredin Nouili =

German gridiron football player (born 2000)

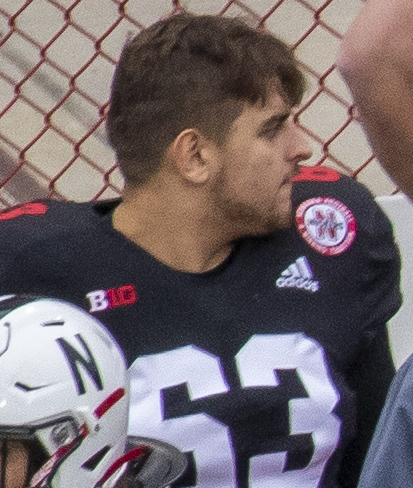
- Nouili with Nebraska in 2020

No. 69 – Winnipeg Blue Bombers
- Position: Offensive lineman
- Roster status: Practice roster
- CFL status: Global

Personal information
- Born: October 31, 2000 (age 26); Germany
- Listed height: 6 ft 3 in (1.91 m)
- Listed weight: 321 lb (146 kg)

Career information
- High school: Norris (Firth, Nebraska, U.S.)
- College: Colorado State (2019); Nebraska (2020–2023)
- NFL draft: 2024: undrafted
- CFL draft: 2024G: 2nd round, 18th overall pick

Career history
- New Orleans Saints (2024)*; Montreal Alouettes (2024–2025); Ottawa Redblacks (2026)*; Munich Ravens (2026); Winnipeg Blue Bombers (2026–present)*
- * Offseason or practice squad member only
- Stats at CFL.ca

Nouredin Nouili (born October 31, 2000) is a German professional gridiron football offensive lineman for the Winnipeg Blue Bombers of the Canadian Football League (CFL). He played college football at Colorado State and Nebraska.

== Early life ==
Nouredin Nouili was born on October 31, 2000, in Germany. He grew up in Frankfurt, and played American football. He spent his final year of high school as an exchange student at Norris High School in Firth, Nebraska. Nouili played both offensive and defensive line at Norris High, posting 32 tackles (including seven for loss). He earned honorable mention all-state honors.

== College career ==
Nouili first played college football for the Colorado State Rams of Colorado State University. He played in eight games, starting seven, as a true freshman in 2019. He was the first Colorado State true freshman to start on the offensive line since 1996.

On December 13, 2019, Nouili announced that he was transferring to play for the Nebraska Cornhuskers of the University of Nebraska–Lincoln. He joined the team as a walk-on and did not play in any games during the COVID-19 shortened 2020 season. However, he was on the travel roster for four of five road games. Nouili was put on scholarship before the 2021 season. He appeared in all 12 games, starting the last seven games, in 2021 and was named Academic All-Big Ten. He was suspended for the entire 2022 season after failing a drug test. Nouili was named Academic All-Big Ten for the second straught year in 2022. He played in eleven games, all starts, as a fifth-year junior in 2023. He majored in criminology and criminal justice at Nebraska.

== Professional career ==
Pre-draft measurables
Height	Weight	Arm length	Hand span	Wingspan	40-yard dash	10-yard split	20-yard split	20-yard shuttle	Three-cone drill	Vertical jump	Broad jump	Bench press
6 ft 2 7/8 in (1.90 m)	310 lb (141 kg)	32 3/4 in (0.83 m)	10 3/8 in (0.26 m)	6 ft 10 3/4 in (2.10 m)	5.18 s	1.76 s	2.91 s	4.72 s	7.55 s	31.0 in (0.79 m)	9 ft 3 in (2.82 m)	18 reps
All values from Pro Day

On April 30, 2024, Nouili was selected by the Montreal Alouettes of the Canadian Football League (CFL) in the second round, with the 18th overall and final pick, of the 2024 CFL global draft. He signed with the New Orleans Saints on May 10, 2024, after going undrafted in the 2024 NFL draft. He was released on July 27, 2024.

Nouili was signed to the practice roster of the Alouettes on September 3, 2024. He was placed on the one-game injured list on October 25, 2024. He spent the entire 2025 season on Montreal's practice roster.

Nouili signed with the CFL's Ottawa Redblacks on December 8, 2025. On May 17, 2026, he was released.

Subsequently, Nouili signed with the Munich Ravens in the European Football Alliance.

On September 20, 2026, Nouili signed with the Winnipeg Blue Bombers practice roster.
