= Jason Shivers =

American gridiron football player and coach (born 1982)

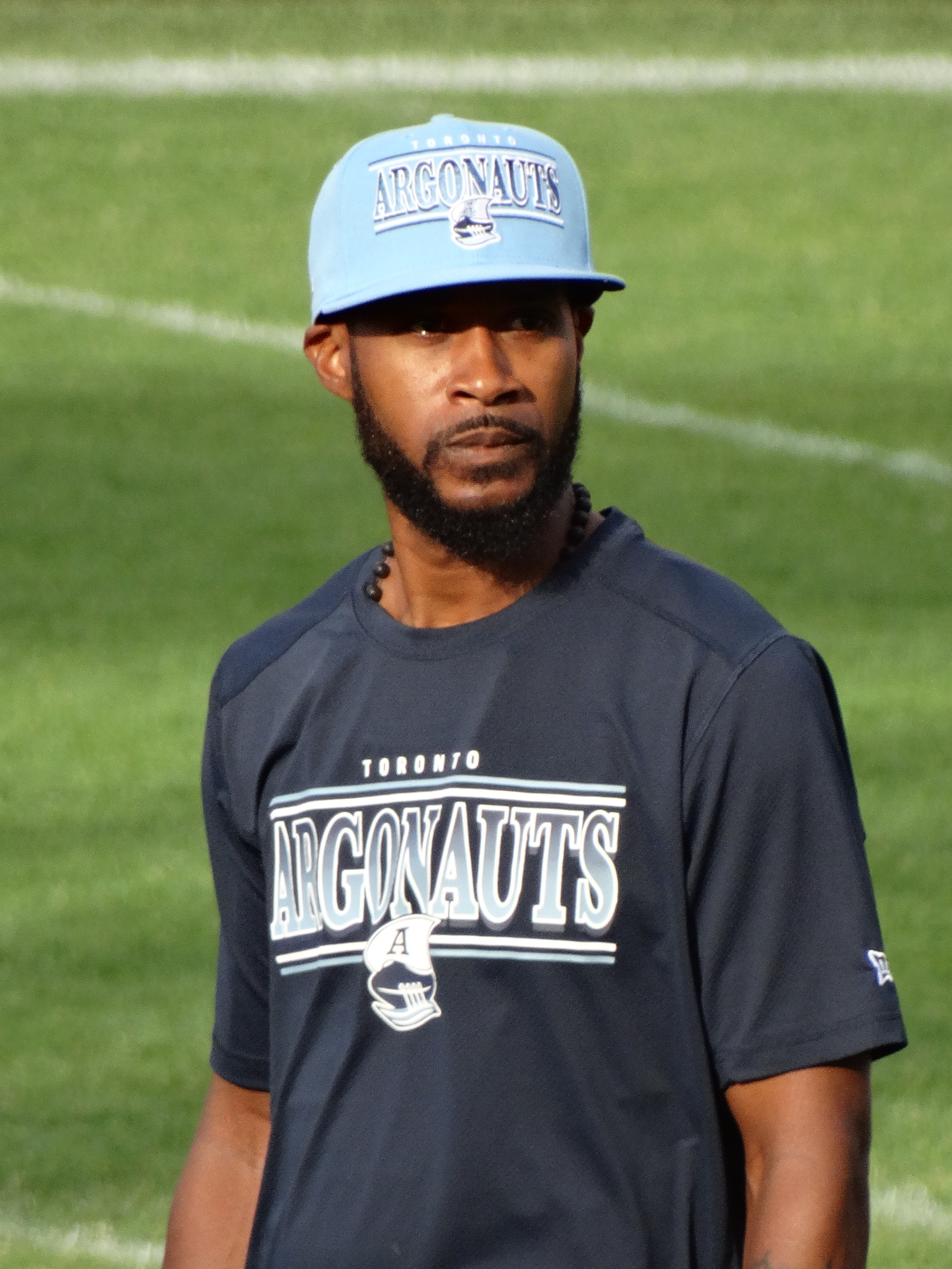
- Shivers with the Toronto Argonauts in 2025

Profile
- Position: Safety

Personal information
- Born: November 4, 1982 (age 44); Phoenix, Arizona, U.S.
- Listed height: 6 ft 0 in (1.83 m)
- Listed weight: 195 lb (88 kg)

Career information
- High school: South Mountain
- College: Arizona State
- NFL draft: 2004: 5th round, 158th overall pick

Career history

Playing
- St. Louis Rams (2004); Chicago Bears (2004); Hamburg Sea Devils (2006); New York Giants (2006)*; Toronto Argonauts (2007–2009); Hamilton Tiger-Cats (2010–2011)
- * Offseason or practice squad member only

Coaching
- Toronto Argonauts (2013) (Defensive assistant); Edmonton Eskimos (2014–2015) (Defensive backs coach); Saskatchewan Roughriders (2016–2018) (Defensive backs coach); Saskatchewan Roughriders (2019–2023) (Defensive coordinator); Edmonton Elks (2024) (Assistant head coach) (Defensive coordinator) (Linebackers coach); Toronto Argonauts (2025) (Co-defensive coordinator) (Defensive backs coach)

Operations
- Toronto Argonauts (2025) (Pro player personnel assistant)
- Stats at Pro Football Reference

Jason Shivers [SHY-verz] (born November 4, 1982) is an American professional football coach and former player. Shivers played professionally at safety in the National Football League (NFL), and NFL Europe, and Canadian Football League (CFL). He played college football for the Arizona State Sun Devils and was selected by the St. Louis Rams in the fifth round of the 2004 NFL draft. He was also a member of the Chicago Bears, Hamburg Sea Devils, New York Giants, Toronto Argonauts, and Hamilton Tiger-Cats.

== Early life ==
A 2001 graduate of Phoenix's South Mountain High School. He earned First-team Super All-State 2000 defensive honors from Phoenix Metro Magazine. He was All-state, All-league and All-region at wide receiver and free safety. As a senior had 110 tackles and four interceptions. As a junior, had 15 catches for 600 yards and 10 touchdowns and on defense, he had 70 tackles, two fumble recoveries, three caused fumbles and 10 tackles for loss.

Shivers also lettered four years in track and won state individual track titles in the 100 (10.67) and 200 meter (21.57) dashes in 2001. He also was on state champion 400-meter relay team with a time of 41.82 as a junior. He earned First-team All-Arizona Republic track team honors as a senior.

== College career ==
At Arizona State University he led the team in tackles his final three seasons, totaling 104 tackles and three interceptions in 2003 and after 121 tackles as a sophomore in 2001. Shivers posted 89 tackles as a freshman in 2000.

== Professional career ==
Pre-draft measurables
| Height | Weight | 40-yard dash | 10-yard split | 20-yard split | 20-yard shuttle | Three-cone drill | Vertical jump | Broad jump | Bench press | Wonderlic |
|---|---|---|---|---|---|---|---|---|---|---|
| 6 ft 0 1/2 in (1.84 m) | 201 lb (91 kg) | 4.51 s | 1.58 s | 2.67 s | x s | x s | 36 in (0.91 m) | 10 ft 8 in (3.25 m) | 19 reps | 14 |
All from NFL Combine.

=== St. Louis Rams ===
Shivers was selected in the fifth round in the 2004 NFL draft by the St. Louis Rams. He was released in the preseason.

=== Chicago Bears ===
After he was released by the Rams, Shivers was signed by the Chicago Bears and spent the 2004 season with that club, dressing for one regular season game.

=== Hamburg Sea Devils ===
In 2006, Shivers played for the Hamburg Sea Devils.

=== New York Giants ===
Shivers spent the 2006 preseason with the New York Giants, but was released prior to the start of the regular season on August 30, 2006.

=== Toronto Argonauts ===
Shivers signed with the Toronto Argonauts on February 8, 2007. However, he did not play in 2007 after suffering a season-ending injury in the team's first pre-season game against the Montreal Alouettes. He re-signed with the Argonauts on January 23, 2008.

In 2008, Shivers played in 14 regular season games, starting in seven, where he had 30 defensive tackles, seven special teams tackles, and two interceptions. In the following season, he became a regular starter where he played and started in 17 regular season games and had 64 defensive tackles, four special teams tackles, one interception, and two fumble recoveries.

=== Hamilton Tiger-Cats ===
On February 17, 2010, Shivers signed with the Hamilton Tiger-Cats. In two seasons with the Tiger-Cats, he played in 26 regular season games, starting in 23, and recorded 80 defensive tackles, eight special teams tackles, three interceptions, and one fumble recovery.

== Coaching career ==
=== Toronto Argonauts ===
Shivers began his coaching career as a defensive assistant with the Toronto Argonauts in 2013.

=== Edmonton Eskimos ===
On January 28, 2014, it was announced that Shivers had joined the Edmonton Eskimos as the team's defensive backs coach, joining newly hired head coach, Chris Jones, who was the defensive coordinator with the Argonauts in 2013. He served in this capacity for two seasons, including in 2015 when Shivers won his first Grey Cup as a member of the 103rd Grey Cup championship team.

=== Saskatchewan Roughriders ===
On December 16, 2015, Shivers joined the Saskatchewan Roughriders as the team's defensive backs coach, joining new head coach, Chris Jones. On February 8, 2019, the Riders announced that Shivers had been promoted to the role of defensive coordinator following the departure of Jones. He remained in that capacity for five years, but was not retained for the 2024 season.

=== Edmonton Elks ===
On March 18, 2024, it was announced that Shivers had been hired by the Edmonton Elks to serve as the team's assistant head coach, defensive coordinator, and linebackers coach. The move reunited Shivers with Chris Jones, who had also stepped down as the team's defensive coordinator. Jones was fired midway through the 2024 season and Shivers was not retained in 2025.

=== Toronto Argonauts (II) ===
It was announced on March 21, 2025, that Shivers had joined the Toronto Argonauts as the team's co-defensive coordinator, defensive backs coach, and pro player personnel assistant. He served in that capacity for one year, but was not retained in 2026.

== Personal life ==
Shivers has five children.
