= Matthew Hayball =

Australian gridiron football player (born 1997)

Profile
- Position: Punter

Personal information
- Born: 12 March 1997 (age 29); Adelaide, South Australia, Australia
- Listed height: 6 ft 0 in (1.83 m)
- Listed weight: 189 lb (86 kg)

Career information
- High school: Sacred Heart College (Adelaide, Australia)
- College: Florida Atlantic (2019–2021); Vanderbilt (2022–2023)
- NFL draft: 2024: undrafted
- CFL draft: 2024G: 1st round, 2nd overall pick

Career history
- New Orleans Saints (2024); Atlanta Falcons (2026)*
- * Offseason or practice squad member only

Awards and highlights
- Second-team All-American (2023); First-team All-SEC (2023)

Career NFL statistics as of 2024
- Punts: 75
- Punting yards: 3,303
- Punting average: 43.7
- Longest punt: 59
- Inside 20: 36
- Stats at Pro Football Reference

Matthew Hayball (born 12 March 1997) is an Australian professional American football punter. He has previously played in the National Football League (NFL) for the New Orleans Saints. He played college football for the Florida Atlantic Owls and Vanderbilt Commodores. He previously was an Australian rules football player who was drafted by the Geelong Football Club, although he was delisted without having appeared in an Australian Football League (AFL) game.

== Early life and Australian rules football career ==
Hayball was born on 12 March 1997 and grew up in West Adelaide, Australia. His father played in the Central Australian Football League. He attended Sacred Heart College in Adelaide from grades 7 to 12. He grew up playing Australian rules football, being a midfielder, and he was a member of the West Adelaide Football Club U18s in the 2015 season, with two games at the reserve level towards the end of the year.

Hayball was the final pick of the 2015 AFL national draft, chosen 70th overall by the Geelong Football Club. His selection was seen as a surprise, with the club website noting that "He was so far off the radar prior to the draft that after his name was called out AFL.com.au had no information on him other than his name, age and club." He played three years for the club, appearing in 50 matches in the Victorian Football League (VFL). He was also selected by Geelong in the second round (30th overall) of the 2018 AFL rookie draft. Following the 2018 season, he was delisted, having not played any games in the Australian Football League (AFL) during his time with Geelong.

== College football career ==
After being delisted by Geelong, Hayball switched to American football, contacting Nathan Chapman to join Chapman's Prokick Australia academy, designed to help Australians earn athletic scholarships to play college football in the U.S. He was able to enroll at Florida Atlantic University in 2019 to play for the Florida Atlantic Owls football team as a punter. As a freshman that year, he appeared in 14 games and punted 68 times for 2,958 yards, ranking 33rd in the nation with a punting average of 43.5 yards. He was chosen to the Conference USA All-Freshman team and was the Special Teams MVP of the team's 2019 Boca Raton Bowl victory. Hayball played nine games in 2020, totaling 45 punts for 1,983 yards – a 44.1 yard average – while being named honorable mention All-Conference USA. He was also a member of the Academic All-Conference team. In 2021, he punted 61 times for 2,785 yards (a 45.7 yard average) in 12 games, with 28 of his punts being inside the 20-yard-line and six being touchbacks. He repeated as an honorable mention All-Conference USA pick and was again chosen to the Academic All-Conference squad.

Hayball transferred to the Vanderbilt Commodores in 2022, having averaged 44.4 yards during his 35 games in three years at Florida Atlantic. In his first year with the Commodores, he played in 12 games and punted 59 times for 2,634 yards, with a long of 65 yards and 21 punts inside the 20. He placed fourth in school history with a punting average of 45.36 yards; that total also was second in the Southeastern Conference (SEC) and 11th in the nation. He also forced one fumble during the season, and was named to the SEC First Year Academic Honor Roll.

As a senior in 2023, Hayball played 12 games and recorded 57 punts for 2,713 yards, with 24 being inside the 20 and a long of 71 yards. His punting average of 47.6 yards ranked top ten nationally and first in the SEC, and his net punting yards average (43.1 yards) was seventh nationally. His long punt of 71 yards was something achieved by only 14 punters in the 2023 season, and he was named the Ray Guy Punter of the Week following a game in which he averaged 50.3 yards, second-best in program history. He was chosen first-team midseason All-American by Pro Football Focus (PFF) and the Associated Press (AP), and at the end of the season he earned a number of awards including second-team All-America honors by five selectors. He was the first-team All-SEC punter by two selectors and was named the College Football Network SEC Punter of the Year. He was a finalist for the Ray Guy Award as best punter nationally and was the first Vanderbilt All-American at any position since 2016, as well as the first first-team All-SEC punter from the school since 1996. He was also named College Sports Communicators Academic All-District and to the SEC Fall Academic Honor Roll.

Hayball ended his collegiate career as Vanderbilt's all-time leader in punting average, with 46.5 yards per punt. Overall, he totaled 289 punts for 13,073 yards, an average of 45.2 yards per punt, with 108 punts inside the 20. He was the only active punter in the NCAA with over 13,000 total yards by the end of the 2023 season. He was invited to the 2024 East–West Shrine Bowl and graduated with a bachelor's degree in finance (from Florida Atlantic) and a master's degree in organizational performance (from Vanderbilt).

== Professional career ==
Pre-draft measurables
Height	Weight	Arm length	Hand span	Wingspan
6 ft 0 1/2 in (1.84 m)	190 lb (86 kg)	30 1/8 in (0.77 m)	9 3/4 in (0.25 m)	6 ft 1 1/2 in (1.87 m)
All values from Pro Day

=== New Orleans Saints ===
After going unselected in the 2024 NFL draft, Hayball was signed by the New Orleans Saints as an undrafted free agent, with a contract including $35,000 guaranteed. He was also chosen in the first round (second overall) of the 2024 CFL global draft by the Ottawa Redblacks. With the Saints, he competed with fellow Australian Lou Hedley for the starting punter job. After Hedley was waived in the final round of roster cuts, Hayball was one of four UDFAs signed by the Saints to make the team's initial 53-man roster. Hayball started all 17 games of the 2024 season, making 75 punts for 3,303 yards. He led the league in punts downed inside the 20-yard line (54.7%). On August 6, 2025, the Saints cut Hayball.

=== Atlanta Falcons ===
On June 18, 2026, Hayball signed with the Atlanta Falcons. He was waived by the Falcons on August 17.
