= Julian Howsare =

American gridiron football player (born 1992)

- Howsare with the Montreal Alouettes in 2026

No. 25 – Montreal Alouettes
- Position: Defensive end
- Roster status: Active
- CFL status: American

Personal information
- Born: September 11, 1992 (age 34); Altoona, Pennsylvania, U.S.
- Listed height: 6 ft 3 in (1.91 m)
- Listed weight: 255 lb (116 kg)

Career information
- High school: Altoona (PA)
- College: Clarion
- NFL draft: 2015: undrafted

Career history
- New York Jets (2015–2016); Seattle Seahawks (2016)*; New York Jets (2017)*; Hamilton Tiger-Cats (2018–2022); Calgary Stampeders (2023–2024); Hamilton Tiger-Cats (2025–2026); Montreal Alouettes (2026–present)
- * Offseason or practice squad member only

Awards and highlights
- James P. McCaffrey Trophy (2025); CFL All-Star (2025); 2× CFL East All-Star (2022, 2025)
- Stats at Pro Football Reference
- Stats at CFL.ca

Julian Howsare (born September 11, 1992) is an American professional football defensive end for the Montreal Alouettes of the Canadian Football League (CFL). He played college football at Clarion and was signed by the New York Jets as an undrafted free agent in 2015.

== College career ==
Howsare was selected to the FB Gazette All-American third-team in Sophomore and Junior seasons in 2012 and 2013. Howsare was named PSAC-WEST Defensive Player of the Year in his junior season in 2013. Howsare was a graduate from Clarion University of Pennsylvania and was a key, well rounded defensive player on Clarion's Division 2 football team.

== Professional career ==
Pre-draft measurables
| Height | Weight | Arm length | Hand span | Wingspan | 40-yard dash | 10-yard split | 20-yard split | 20-yard shuttle | Three-cone drill | Vertical jump | Broad jump | Bench press |
|---|---|---|---|---|---|---|---|---|---|---|---|---|
| 6 ft 2 1/4 in (1.89 m) | 254 lb (115 kg) | 31 1/2 in (0.80 m) | 9 1/4 in (0.23 m) | 6 ft 6 3/8 in (1.99 m) | 4.77 s | 1.67 s | 2.67 s | 4.52 s | 7.50 s | 32.0 in (0.81 m) | 9 ft 10 in (3.00 m) | 19 reps |
All values from Villanova Pro Day

=== New York Jets (first stint) ===
Howsare went undrafted in the 2015 NFL draft and signed with the New York Jets on the night of May 2, 2015, shortly after the conclusion of the draft. The signing was formalized by the team six days later. On September 6, 2015, Howsare was signed to the practice squad. On November 4, 2015, Howsare was released from practice squad. On November 26, Howsare re-signed to the practice squad.

On September 22, 2016, Howsare was released by the Jets. He was signed to the practice squad two days later. He was released on October 4, 2016.

=== Seattle Seahawks ===
On October 11, 2016, Howsare was signed to the Seahawks' practice squad. He was released by the Seahawks on November 1, 2016.

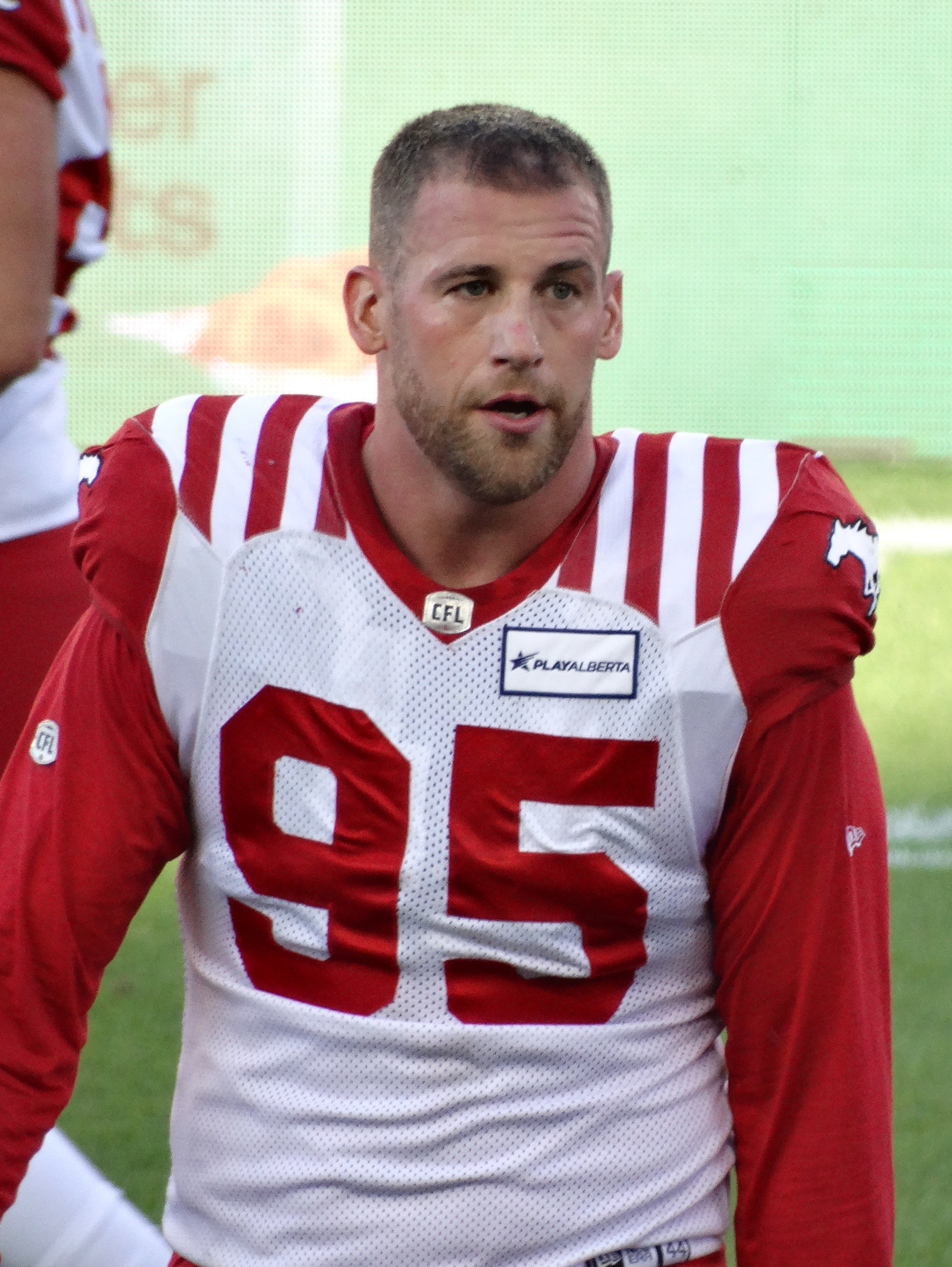
Howsare with the Calgary Stampeders in 2024

=== New York Jets (second stint) ===
On January 11, 2017, Howsare signed a reserve/future contract with the Jets. He was released by the Jets on September 5, 2017.

=== Hamilton Tiger-Cats (first stint) ===
Howsare signed with the Hamilton Tiger-Cats on February 21, 2018. In his first year, he played in 15 regular season games, including seven starts, where he had 26 defensive tackles, three sacks, one forced fumble, and one pass knockdown. In 2019, he played in all 18 regular season games and made ten starts where he had 22 defensive tackles, four special teams tackles, and six sacks. He played in both post-season games and made his Grey Cup debut, where he had one defensive tackle in the 107th Grey Cup loss to the Winnipeg Blue Bombers. He did not play in 2020 due to the cancellation of the 2020 CFL season.

Howsare signed a contract extension with the Tiger-Cats through the 2022 season on January 4, 2021. In a shortened season, he played and started in 13 regular season games where he had 34 defensive tackles and five sacks. He played in the 108th Grey Cup and recorded three defensive tackles, but the Tiger-Cats again lost to the Blue Bombers. In 2022, he recorded 30 defensive tackles and recorded a career-high seven sacks along with his first two career interceptions. Howsare was named a Division All-Star for the first time in his career. He became a free agent upon the expiry of his contract on February 14, 2023.

=== Calgary Stampeders ===
On February 14, 2023, it was announced that Howsare had signed with the Calgary Stampeders. In the 2023 season, he played in all 18 regular season games where he recorded 48 defensive tackles, one special teams tackle, six sacks, and two forced fumbles. Howsare played in 17 games in 2024 where he had 36 defensive tackles and five sacks. He became a free agent upon the expiry of his contract on February 11, 2025.

=== Hamilton Tiger-Cats (second stint) ===
On February 24, 2025, the Hamilton Tiger-Cats announced that Howsare had signed with the club. In his 100th game, he scored his first career touchdown on June 27, 2025, on a fumble recovery in the endzone, against the Montreal Alouettes.

=== Montreal Alouettes ===
On September 29, 2026, Howsare was traded by the Tiger-Cats to the Montreal Alouettes.
