= Brooklyn Heights, Missouri =

- Village
- Location of Brooklyn Heights, Missouri
- Coordinates: 37°10′10″N 94°23′08″W
- Country: United States
- State: Missouri
- County: Jasper

Area
  - Total: 0.12 sq mi (0.30 km^{2})
  - Land: 0.12 sq mi (0.30 km^{2})
  - Water: 0 sq mi (0.00 km^{2})
- Elevation: 971 ft (296 m)

Population (2020)
  - Total: 101
  - Density: 881.8/sq mi (340.46/km^{2})
- Time zone: UTC-6 (Central (CST))
  - Summer (DST): UTC-5 (CDT)
- ZIP code: 64836
- Area code: 417
- FIPS code: 29-08776
- GNIS feature ID: 2396606

Brooklyn Heights is a village in Jasper County, Missouri, United States. The population was 101 at the 2020 census. It is part of the Joplin, Missouri Metropolitan Statistical Area.

== Geography ==
According to the United States Census Bureau, the village has a total area of 0.12 square miles (0.31 km^{2}), all land.

== Demographics ==
Historical population
Census	Pop.	Note	%±
1970	128		—
1980	126		−1.6%
1990	116		−7.9%
2000	125		7.8%
2010	100		−20.0%
2020	101		1.0%
U.S. Decennial Census

=== 2010 census ===
As of the census of 2010, there were 100 people, 50 households, and 32 families living in the village. The population density was 833.3 inhabitants per square mile (321.7/km^{2}). There were 52 housing units at an average density of 433.3 per square mile (167.3/km^{2}). The racial makeup of the village was 96.0% White, 1.0% from other races, and 3.0% from two or more races. Hispanic or Latino of any race were 5.0% of the population.

There were 50 households, of which 20.0% had children under the age of 18 living with them, 40.0% were married couples living together, 12.0% had a female householder with no husband present, 12.0% had a male householder with no wife present, and 36.0% were non-families. 30.0% of all households were made up of individuals, and 14% had someone living alone who was 65 years of age or older. The average household size was 2.00 and the average family size was 2.41.

The median age in the village was 54.3 years. 14% of residents were under the age of 18; 7% were between the ages of 18 and 24; 16% were from 25 to 44; 36% were from 45 to 64; and 27% were 65 years of age or older. The gender makeup of the village was 49.0% male and 51.0% female.

=== 2000 census ===
As of the census of 2000, there were 125 people, 49 households, and 34 families living in the town. The population density was 1,046.6 inhabitants per square mile (404.1/km^{2}). There were 53 housing units at an average density of 443.8 per square mile (171.4/km^{2}). The racial makeup of the town was 96.00% White, and 4.00% from two or more races.

There were 49 households, out of which 24.5% had children under the age of 18 living with them, 57.1% were married couples living together, 12.2% had a female householder with no husband present, and 28.6% were non-families. 24.5% of all households were made up of individuals, and 16.3% had someone living alone who was 65 years of age or older. The average household size was 2.55 and the average family size was 3.03.

In the town the population was spread out, with 24.0% under the age of 18, 5.6% from 18 to 24, 21.6% from 25 to 44, 30.4% from 45 to 64, and 18.4% who were 65 years of age or older. The median age was 44 years. For every 100 females, there were 98.4 males. For every 100 females age 18 and over, there were 97.9 males.

The median income for a household in the town was $31,875, and the median income for a family was $31,250. Males had a median income of $26,250 versus $17,500 for females. The per capita income for the town was $12,458. There were 14.7% of families and 21.0% of the population living below the poverty line, including 35.0% of under eighteens and 21.7% of those over 64.

== Education ==
It is in the Carthage R-IX School District. The comprehensive high school is Carthage Senior High School.
