= Olivier Muembi =

Canadian gridiron football player (born 1999)

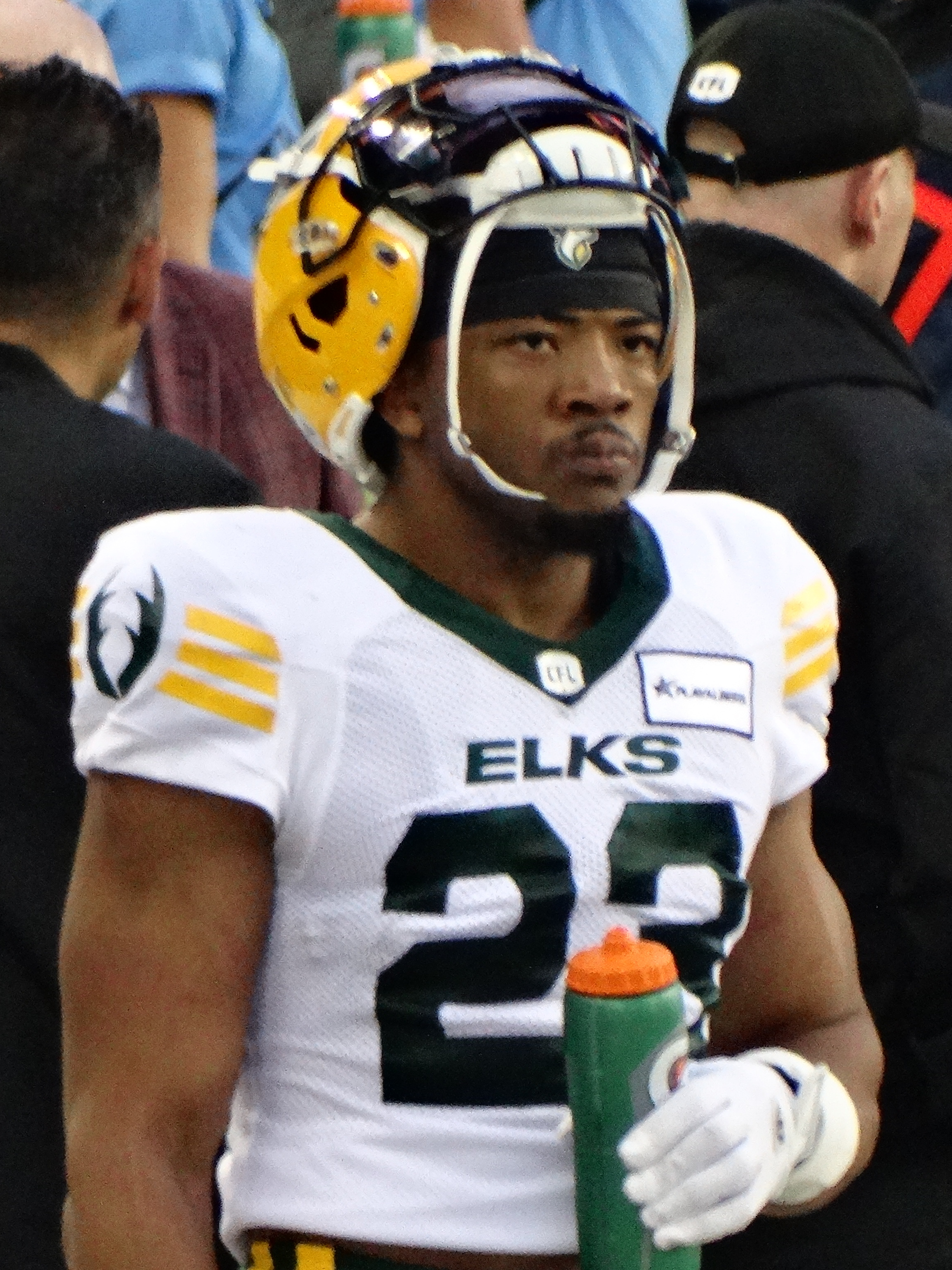
- Muembi with the Edmonton Elks in 2024

No. 23
- Position: Linebacker

Personal information
- Born: October 21, 1999 (age 27); Democratic Republic of Congo
- Listed height: 6 ft 0 in (1.83 m)
- Listed weight: 226 lb (103 kg)

Career information
- High school: Saltfleet District High
- College: Delaware State
- University: Queen's
- CFL draft: 2024: 3rd round, 21st overall pick

Career history
- 2024–2025: Edmonton Elks
- Stats at CFL.ca

Olivier Kamudikolo Muembi (born October 21, 1999) is a Canadian former professional football linebacker who played for the Edmonton Elks of the Canadian Football League (CFL).

== University career ==
Muembi first played college football for the Delaware State Hornets from 2018 to 2021. He played in 25 games where he recorded 53 total tackles and 2.5 sacks. He then transferred to Queen's University where he played U Sports football for the Gaels in 2023. He played in eight regular season games where he had 27 solo tackles, nine assisted tackles, and one sack.

== Professional career ==
Pre-draft measurables
Height	Weight	40-yard dash	20-yard shuttle	Three-cone drill	Vertical jump	Broad jump	Bench press
6 ft 0 3/8 in (1.84 m)	226 lb (103 kg)	4.84 s	4.44 s	7.07 s	36.0 in (0.91 m)	10 ft 5 1/8 in (3.18 m)	18 reps
All values from CFL Combine

Muembi was drafted in the third round, 21st overall, by the Edmonton Elks in the 2024 CFL draft and signed with the team on May 6, 2024. Following training camp in 2024, he made the team's active roster and made his professional debut on June 8, 2024, against the Saskatchewan Roughriders, where he recorded two special teams tackles. He played in 17 regular season games in his rookie year where he recorded one defensive tackle and six special teams tackles.

On May 31, 2026, the Elks moved Muembi to the retired list.

== Personal life ==
Muembi was born in the Democratic Republic of Congo to parents Julie and Banakaybov Muembi. He has two brothers and two sisters.
