= Arkell Smith =

American gridiron football player (born 1998)

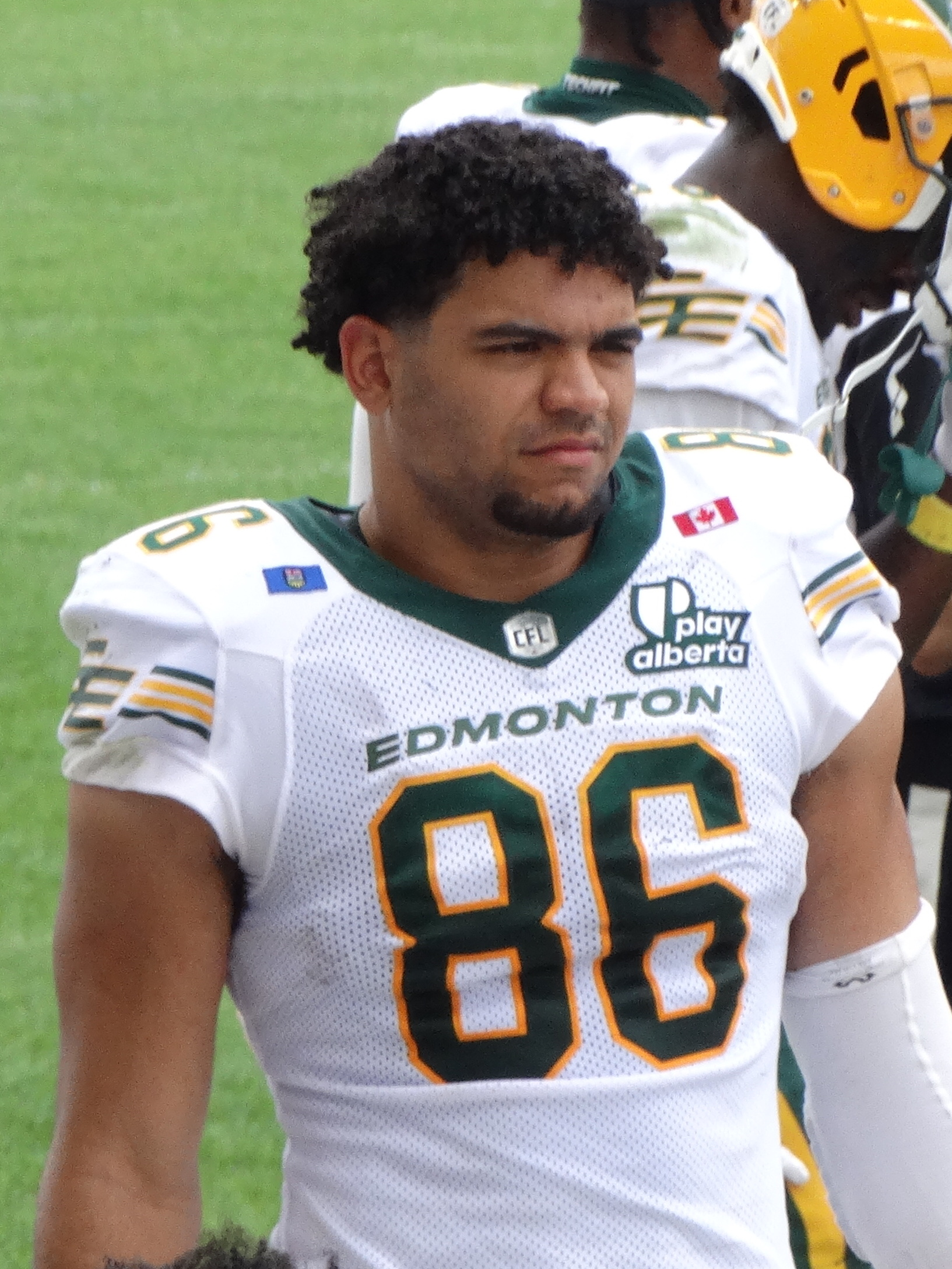
- Smith with the Edmonton Elks in 2025

No. 86 – Montreal Alouettes
- Position: Wide receiver
- Roster status: Practice rsoter
- CFL status: American

Personal information
- Born: October 25, 1999 (age 27); Carthage, Missouri, U.S.
- Listed height: 6 ft 1 in (1.85 m)
- Listed weight: 194 lb (88 kg)

Career information
- High school: Carthage High
- College: Central Missouri
- NFL draft: 2024: undrafted

Career history
- Edmonton Elks (2024–2025); Montreal Alouettes (2026–present)*
- * Offseason or practice squad member only
- Stats at CFL.ca

Arkell Smith (born October 25, 1999) is an American professional football wide receiver for the Montreal Alouettes of the Canadian Football League (CFL).

== College career ==
After using a redshirt season in 2018, Smith played college football for the Central Missouri Mules from 2019 to 2023. He played in 41 games where he had 196 catches for 2,816 yards and 34 touchdowns, finishing as the all-time leader in receptions and receiving touchdowns in program history.

== Professional career ==
=== Edmonton Elks ===
Smith was signed by the Edmonton Elks on April 2, 2024. Following training camp in 2024, he began the year on the practice roster. He then made his professional debut on June 22, 2024, against the Toronto Argonauts where he had two catches for 13 yards. In his third game, on July 14, 2024, against the Ottawa Redblacks, Smith scored his first career touchdown on a 10-yard pass from McLeod Bethel-Thompson. He became a free agent after the 2025 season.

=== Montreal Alouettes ===
On September 27, 2026, Smith signed with the Montreal Alouettes practice roster.

== Personal life ==
Smith was born to parents David and Anna Pillar.
