= Fidelity, Missouri =

- Village
- Location of Fidelity, Missouri
- Coordinates: 37°04′54″N 94°18′34″W
- Country: United States
- State: Missouri
- County: Jasper

Area
  - Total: 0.97 sq mi (2.50 km^{2})
  - Land: 0.97 sq mi (2.50 km^{2})
  - Water: 0 sq mi (0.00 km^{2})
- Elevation: 1,070 ft (330 m)

Population (2020)
  - Total: 227
  - Density: 234.8/sq mi (90.66/km^{2})
- Time zone: UTC-6 (Central (CST))
  - Summer (DST): UTC-5 (CDT)
- ZIP code: 64836
- Area code: 417
- FIPS code: 29-24120
- GNIS feature ID: 2396937

Fidelity is a village in Jasper County, Missouri, United States. The population was 227 at the 2020 census. It is part of the Joplin, Missouri Metropolitan Statistical Area.

== History ==
Fidelity was platted in 1856. A post office called Fidelity was established in 1855, and remained in operation until 1901.

== Geography ==
Fidelity is located in south central Jasper County along U.S. 71 one mile south of I-44. Joplin lies ten miles to the west and Carthage is six miles to the north.

According to the United States Census Bureau, the village has a total area of 0.97 square miles (2.51 km^{2}), all land.

== Demographics ==
Historical population
Census	Pop.	Note	%±
1970	191		—
1980	274		43.5%
1990	235		−14.2%
2000	252		7.2%
2010	257		2.0%
2020	227		−11.7%
U.S. Decennial Census

=== 2010 census ===
As of the census of 2010, there were 257 people, 109 households, and 62 families living in the village. The population density was 264.9 inhabitants per square mile (102.3/km^{2}). There were 117 housing units at an average density of 120.6 per square mile (46.6/km^{2}). The racial makeup of the village was 96.9% White, 0.4% African American, 1.6% Native American, and 1.2% from two or more races. Hispanic or Latino of any race were 1.6% of the population.

There were 109 households, of which 27.5% had children under the age of 18 living with them, 40.4% were married couples living together, 10.1% had a female householder with no husband present, 6.4% had a male householder with no wife present, and 43.1% were non-families. 32.1% of all households were made up of individuals, and 11% had someone living alone who was 65 years of age or older. The average household size was 2.36 and the average family size was 3.02.

The median age in the village was 41.6 years. 21.8% of residents were under the age of 18; 9.3% were between the ages of 18 and 24; 24.5% were from 25 to 44; 26.1% were from 45 to 64; and 18.3% were 65 years of age or older. The gender makeup of the village was 52.1% male and 47.9% female.

=== 2000 census ===
As of the census of 2000, there were 252 people, 97 households, and 64 families living in the town. The population density was 260.5 inhabitants per square mile (100.6/km^{2}). There were 106 housing units at an average density of 109.6 per square mile (42.3/km^{2}). The racial makeup of the town was 96.43% White, 0.40% African American, 0.40% Asian, 1.19% from other races, and 1.59% from two or more races. Hispanic or Latino of any race were 1.19% of the population.

There were 97 households, out of which 29.9% had children under the age of 18 living with them, 49.5% were married couples living together, 10.3% had a female householder with no husband present, and 33.0% were non-families. 22.7% of all households were made up of individuals, and 2.1% had someone living alone who was 65 years of age or older. The average household size was 2.60 and the average family size was 3.00.

In the town the population was spread out, with 28.2% under the age of 18, 11.1% from 18 to 24, 27.8% from 25 to 44, 25.4% from 45 to 64, and 7.5% who were 65 years of age or older. The median age was 33 years. For every 100 females, there were 121.1 males. For every 100 females age 18 and over, there were 126.3 males.

The median income for a household in the town was $27,250, and the median income for a family was $35,500. Males had a median income of $31,250 versus $25,625 for females. The per capita income for the town was $9,810. About 26.6% of families and 44.9% of the population were below the poverty line, including 64.2% of those under the age of eighteen and 15.8% of those 65 or over.

== Education ==
It is in the Carthage R-IX School District. The comprehensive high school is Carthage Senior High School.
