= Felix Wright =

American football player (born 1959)

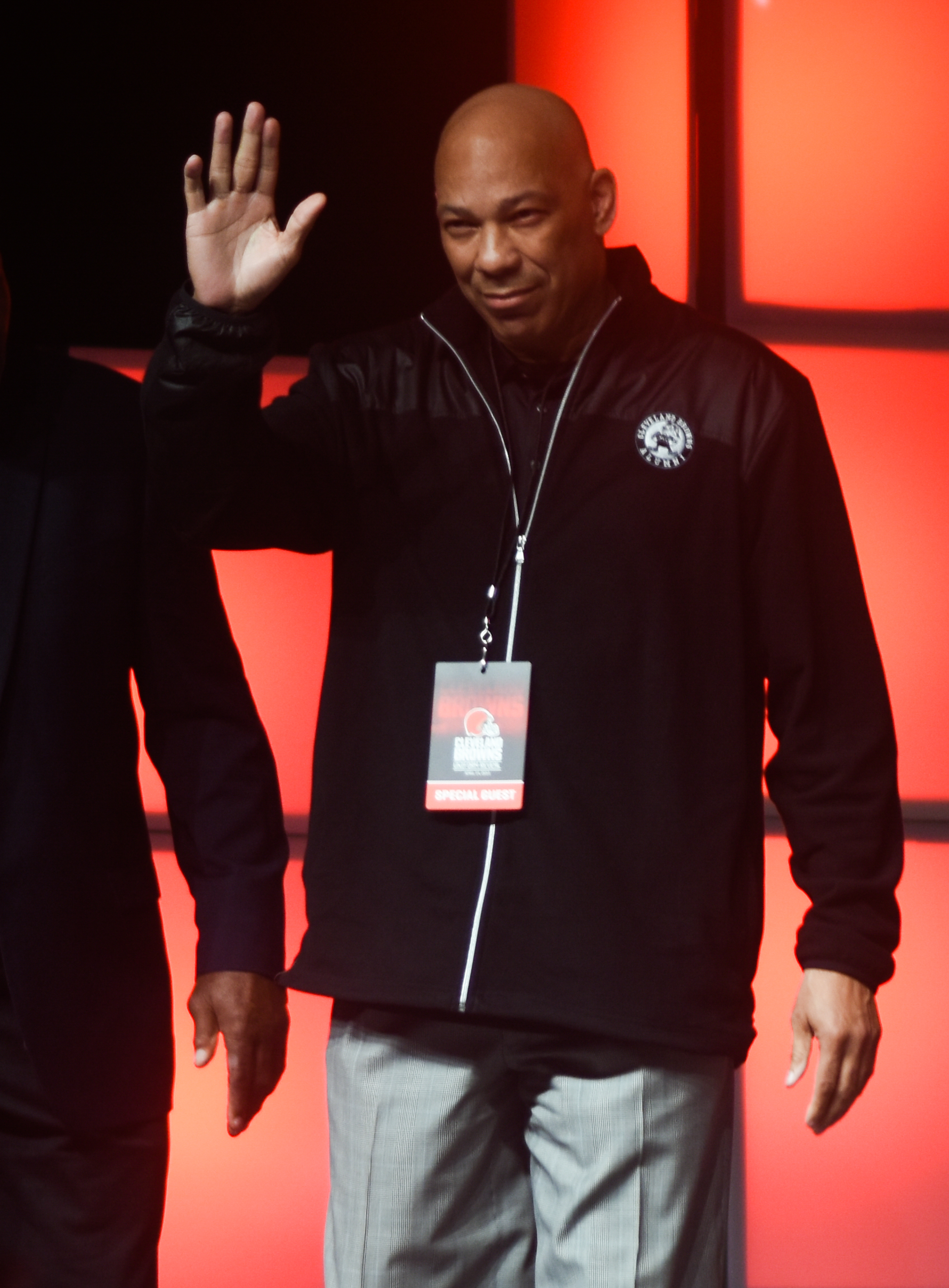

No. 28, 22, 24
- Position: Safety

Personal information
- Born: June 22, 1959 (age 67); Carthage, Missouri, U.S.
- Listed height: 6 ft 2 in (1.88 m)
- Listed weight: 190 lb (86 kg)

Career information
- High school: Carthage
- College: Drake
- NFL draft: 1985: undrafted

Career history
- Hamilton Tiger-Cats (1982–1984); Cleveland Browns (1985–1990); Minnesota Vikings (1991–1992); Kansas City Chiefs (1993)

Awards and highlights
- NFL interceptions leader (1989); 2× CFL All-Star (1983, 1984)

Career NFL statistics
- Interceptions: 29
- Interception yards: 492
- Touchdowns: 2
- Stats at Pro Football Reference

Felix Carl Wright (born June 22, 1959) is an American former professional football player who was a defensive back for the Cleveland Browns and Minnesota Vikings of the National Football League (NFL) from 1985 to 1992 . He played college football for the Drake Bulldogs.

Undrafted out of Drake University, Wright played from 1982 to 1984 in the Canadian Football League (NFL) with the Hamilton Tiger-Cats, earning Eastern Division All-Star honors in his last two seasons. In his final year, he intercepted two passes in Hamilton's 72nd Grey Cup game loss. In 1989, Wright led the NFL in interceptions with nine.

== Professional career ==
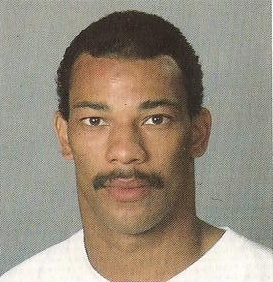
Wright in 1985

He signed with the Browns as a free agent on April 13, 1985, spending his first season with the team in a specialization role in the secondary as well as seeing action on the special teams squad. The following season, he intercepted three passes and thrived on special teams, blocking one punt that was recovered for a touchdown, partially blocking another punt and then returning a blocked punt 30 yards for a touchdown in the Browns' October 26 road victory over the Minnesota Vikings.

Exactly one year after his game against the Vikings, Wright earned Player of the Week accolades in a game against the Los Angeles Rams. In the game, he intercepted one pass and returned it 68 yards to set up Cleveland's first score, then later ran 40 yards with another interception for a touchdown. In 1988, Wright ended the year with three multi-interception games, including a pair in the team's loss to the Houston Oilers in the AFC wild card game, winning AFC Defensive Player of Month in December. The following season, he led the NFL in interceptions with 9. In the November 5 road victory over the Tampa Bay Buccaneers, Wright returned a pass 27 yards for a touchdown.

Felix's younger brother Charles Wright enjoyed a career in both the CFL and briefly in the NFL. His brother, Joe Wright, played professional basketball in Europe.
