= D. K. Bonhomme =

Canadian gridiron football player (born 1999)

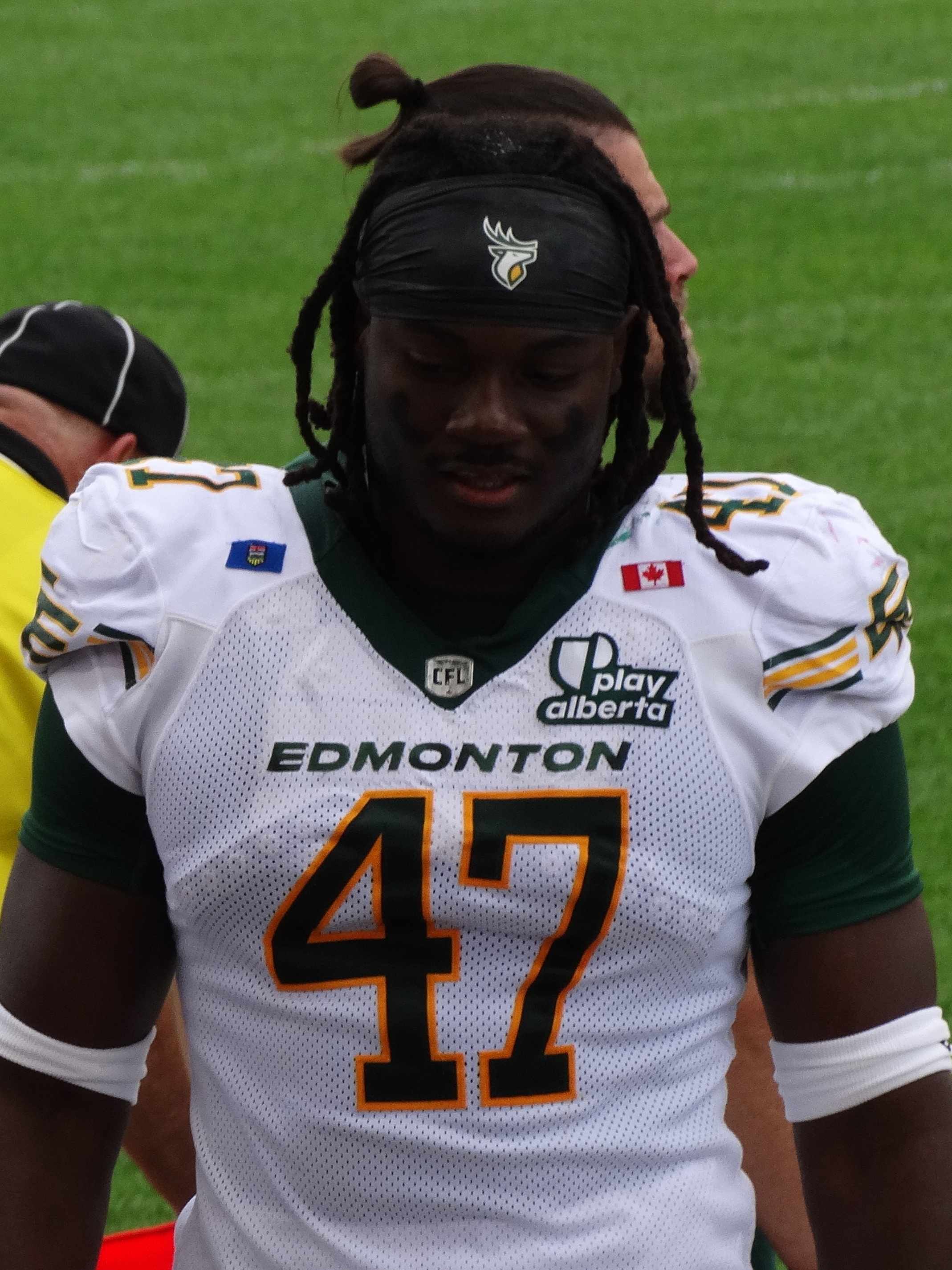
- Bonhomme with the Edmonton Elks in 2025

No. 47 – Edmonton Elks
- Position: Defensive linemen
- Roster status: 1-game injured list
- CFL status: National

Personal information
- Born: September 8, 1999 (age 27); Haiti
- Listed height: 6 ft 0 in (1.83 m)
- Listed weight: 225 lb (102 kg)

Career information
- High school: Clearwater Academy International
- College: Indiana (2019–2021); South Alabama (2022)
- CFL draft: 2024: 2nd round, 10th overall pick

Career history
- 2024–present: Edmonton Elks

Awards and highlights
- Grey Cup champion (2026)
- Stats at CFL.ca

Di-Stephano Kervens Bonhomme (born September 8, 1999) is a Canadian professional football linebacker for the Edmonton Elks of the Canadian Football League (CFL).

== Early life ==
Bonhomme was born in Haiti to parents Pierre Michelet Bonhomme and Elimane Louis. He moved to Montreal when he was five years old and later moved to Ottawa when he was 15 years old.

== University career ==
Bonhomme first played college football for the Indiana Hoosiers from 2019 to 2021. He played in 24 games where he recorded 17 total tackles, two tackles for a loss, and one sack. When he didn't receive much playing time in 2021, partially due to injuries, he transferred to the University of South Alabama to play for the Jaguars in 2022. However, he played in just three games, recording six tackles, before suffering a broken ankle which required surgery and ended his season.

== Professional career ==
Pre-draft measurables
Height	Weight	40-yard dash	20-yard shuttle	Three-cone drill	Vertical jump	Broad jump	Bench press
6 ft 0 1/2 in (1.84 m)	225 lb (102 kg)	4.79 s	4.44 s	7.25 s	37.0 in (0.94 m)	9 ft 11 in (3.02 m)	16 reps
All values from CFL Combine

After not playing football in 2023, but having a strong performance at the CFL Combine, Bonhomme was drafted in the second round, 10th overall, by the Edmonton Elks in the 2024 CFL draft and signed with the team on May 6, 2024. Following training camp in 2024, he made the team's active roster and made his professional debut on June 8, 2024, against the Saskatchewan Roughriders. He played in nine regular season games in his rookie year, where he recorded three special teams tackles, before ending the year on the six-game injured list.
