= Carthage R-9 School District =

School district in Missouri, U.S.

Address
- 709 West Centennial Avenue Carthage, Missouri, 64836; United States

District information
- Type: Public
- Grades: PreK–12
- Superintendent: Dr. Luke Boyer
- NCES District ID: 2907460

Students and staff
- Students: 5,046
- Teachers: 373.18
- Staff: 391.05
- Student–teacher ratio: 13.52

Other information
- Website: www.carthagetigers.org

Carthage R-9 School District is a public school district headquartered in Carthage, Missouri, overseen by superintendent Dr. Luke Boyer.

The district includes Carthage, Brooklyn Heights, Fidelity, the southern portion of Carytown, a portion of Oronogo, and some unincorporated portions of Jasper County, bordering neighboring districts like Webb City R-VII and Joplin R-VIII. The district uses three primary elementary transport and attendance hubs—Columbian, Fairview, and Steadley—which divide the municipal elementary zones.

== History ==
The district's first public schoolhouse was built in 1869 following the American Civil War, which had left the city's original Male and Female Academy in ruins; education for Black students was also initiated by the board around this timeframe. The district organized its official high school program in 1872 and graduated its first class of seven students in 1878.

In 1870, a new schoolhouse, known as Central School, was built on the old academy site at Main and Chestnut streets; this brick building housed all grammar and high school grades until 1904.

In 1881, Lincoln School opened following petitions from the African-American community, named in honor of 16th U.S. president Abraham Lincoln.

In 1892, Columbian Elementary, located on Chestnut Street, was established as an early model elementary facility to handle rising enrollment.

In 1904, due to a regional zinc and lead mining boom, a new, larger high school was built on South Main Street for $100,000. This building is currently used as currently the Carthage 6th Grade Center.

Following community studies, a dedicated three-year junior high school was constructed on East Centennial Avenue in 1958.

The district opened its vocational and technical education center—currently known as the Carthage Technical Center—in August 1965.

== Schools ==
Secondary:

- Carthage High School
- Carthage Technical Center
- Carthage Junior High School
- Carthage 6th Grade Center

Primary:

- Carthage Intermediate Center
- Columbian Elementary School
- Fairview Elementary School
- Pleasant Valley Elementary School
- Steadley Elementary School
- Mark Twain Elementary School

Preschool:

- Early Childhood Center
