= Darius Williams (linebacker) =

American gridiron football player (born 1996)

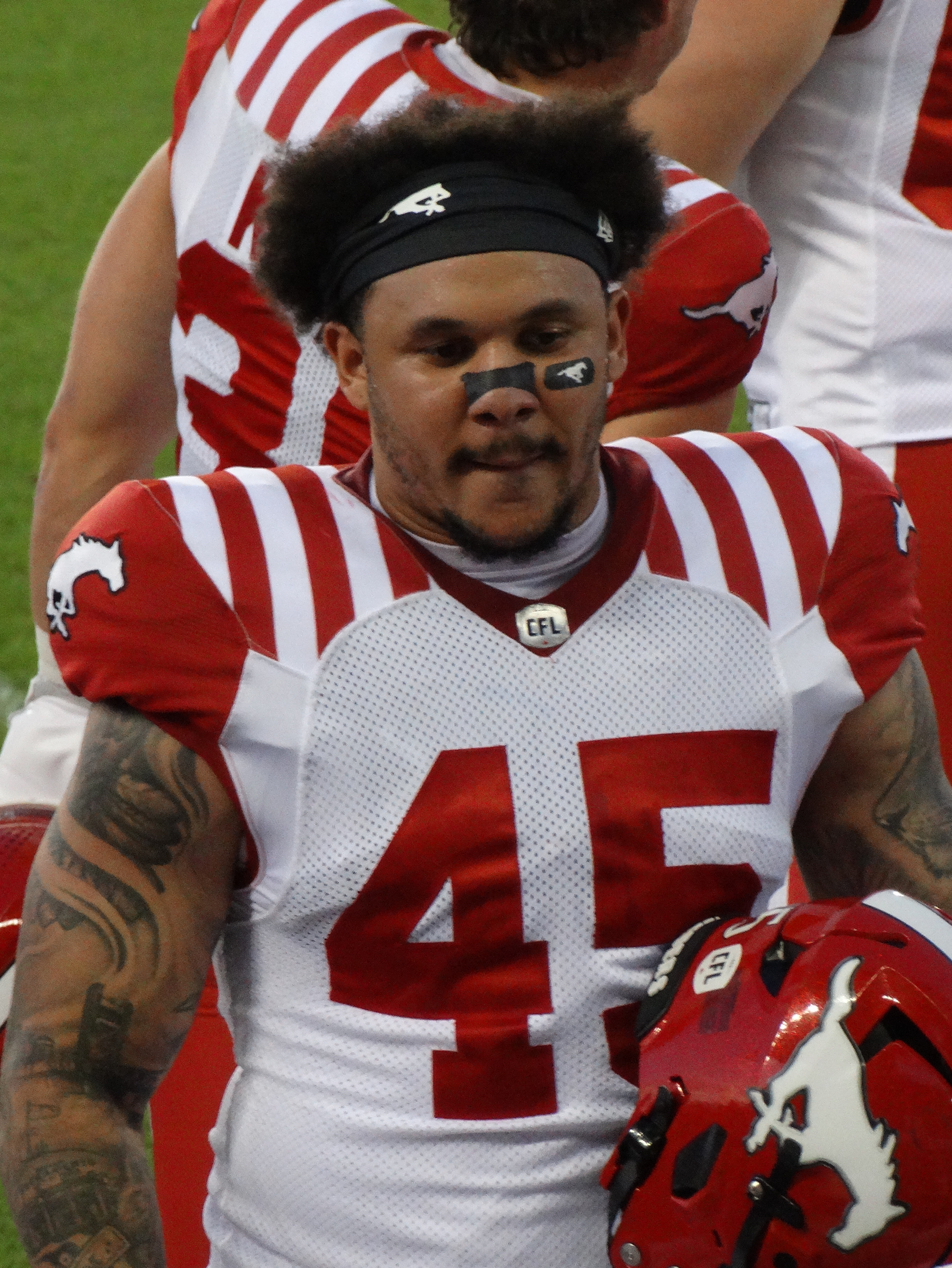
- Williams with the Calgary Stampeders in 2024

No. 36, 45
- Position: Linebacker

Personal information
- Born: June 30, 1996 (age 30); Sacramento, California, U. S.
- Listed height: 5 ft 11 in (1.80 m)
- Listed weight: 220 lb (100 kg)

Career information
- High school: Williams Field (Gilbert, Arizona)
- College: CSU-Pueblo
- NFL draft: 2019: undrafted

Career history
- 2019: New Orleans Saints*
- 2020: Calgary Stampeders*
- 2021: TSL Sea Lions
- 2022–2024: Calgary Stampeders
- * Offseason or practice squad member only

Awards and highlights
- Division II national champion (2014); 2× First-team All-American (2017–2018); 4× First-team All-RMAC (2015–2018)
- Stats at CFL.ca

Darius Williams (born June 30, 1996) is an American former professional football linebacker who played for the Calgary Stampeders of the Canadian Football League (CFL). He played college football for the CSU-Pueblo ThunderWolves. He was also a member of the New Orleans Saints of the National Football League (NFL).

== Early life ==
Williams was born on June 30, 1996. He played high school football at Williams Field High School in Gilbert, Arizona, earning all-state honors as a defensive back.

== College career ==
Williams played college football at CSU-Pueblo from 2015 to 2018. He redshirted in 2014 as CSU-Pueblo won the NCAA Division II national championship.

Williams played in 14 games, starting 10, in 2015, recording 35 tackles, 10 pass breakups and three interceptions. He was named the Rocky Mountain Athletic Conference (RMAC) Defensive Freshman of the Year and also earned first-team All-RMAC honors at cornerback.

Williams played in 11 games, starting 10, at cornerback in 2016, totalling 46 tackles, one sack, one fumble recovery, 12 pass breakups and two interceptions, one of which was returned for a touchdown. He garnered first-team All-RMAC recognition for the second year in a row.

In 2017, Williams recorded 46 tackles, one sack, nine pass breakups and eight interceptions, setting the school record for most interceptions in a season. He was also tied for first in Division II that year with three pick-sixes. He earned first-team All-RMAC honors for the third year in a row and was also named a first-team All-American by D2Football.com and D2CCA while being named a second-team All-American by Don Hansen and the American Football Coaches Association (AFCA).

Williams played in 13 games, starting 12, at cornerback in 2018, compiling 51 tackles, three sacks, three interceptions, 11 pass breakups, one forced fumble, and one fumble recovery. He was named First Team All-RMAC for the fourth consecutive season and also garnered first-team All-American recognition from D2Football.com. Williams was also named to the NFLPA Collegiate Bowl.

== Professional career ==
=== New Orleans Saints ===
Williams signed with the New Orleans Saints on May 2, 2019, after going undrafted in the 2019 NFL draft. He was released by the Saints on May 13, 2019.

=== Calgary Stampeders (first stint) ===
On October 22, 2019, Williams signed a futures contract with the Calgary Stampeders of the Canadian Football League (CFL). The 2020 CFL season was later cancelled due to the COVID-19 pandemic in Canada. He was released by the Stampeders on February 3, 2021.

=== The Spring League ===
Williams was a member of the Sea Lions of The Spring League in 2021.

=== Calgary Stampeders (second stint) ===
Williams signed with the Stampeders on February 3, 2022. He was moved to the practice squad on June 10, promoted to the active roster on June 17, and placed on injured reserve on September 4, 2022. Overall, he dressed in nine games, starting two, for the Stampeders in 2022, recording 10 tackles on defense, six special teams tackles and one sack.

Williams dressed in 16 games, starting one, in 2023, totalling four tackles on defense and a team-leading 22 special teams tackles (which was also second best in the CFL that year). He re-signed with the Stampeders on January 30, 2024. He played in seven games in 2024 where he had two defensive tackles and three special teams tackles. He became a free agent upon the expiry of his contract on February 11, 2025.
