= Thomas Yassmin =

Australian gridiron football player (born 1999)

Profile
- Position: Tight end

Personal information
- Born: 21 October 1999 (age 27); Sydney, New South Wales, Australia
- Listed height: 6 ft 5 in (1.96 m)
- Listed weight: 245 lb (111 kg)

Career information
- High school: Scots College (Bellevue Hill, New South Wales)
- College: Utah (2018–2023)
- NFL draft: 2024: undrafted
- CFL draft: 2024G: 2nd round, 14th overall pick

Career history
- Denver Broncos (2024–2025)*; Los Angeles Chargers (2025–2026)*; Green Bay Packers (2026)*
- * Offseason or practice squad member only
- Stats at Pro Football Reference

Thomas Yassmin (/ˈjæzmɪn/ YAZ-min; born 21 October 1999) is an Australian professional American football tight end. He played college football for the Utah Utes and was signed by the Denver Broncos as an undrafted free agent in 2024.

== Early life ==
Yassmin originally played rugby at Scots College in Sydney, Australia, where he was also selected on the wing for the Australian Schoolboys rugby side. Yassmin decided to play gridiron football in the United States for the college football team the Utah Utes.

== College career ==
In Yassmin's first season in 2018, he redshirted and did not appear in any games. In Yassmin's next two seasons in 2019 and 2020 he played in 16 games while making just two tackles as a special teamer. During the 2021 season, Yassmin only recorded one reception for six yards. In the 2022 regular-season finale, Yassmin notched a 41 yard touchdown as he helped the Utes take down their rival Colorado. In the 2022 Pac-12 Championship, Yassmin caught a pass which he took 60 yards for a touchdown in a win over USC. During the 2022 season, Yassmin hauled in 13 receptions for 301 yards and six touchdowns. In week seven of the 2023 season, Yassmin suffered a season-ending injury. Yassmin finished the 2023 season with eight receptions for 89 yards and a touchdown.

== Professional career ==
Pre-draft measurables
Height	Weight	Arm length	Hand span	Wingspan	40-yard dash	10-yard split	20-yard split	20-yard shuttle	Three-cone drill	Vertical jump	Broad jump
6 ft 4 3/4 in (1.95 m)	245 lb (111 kg)	32 1/8 in (0.82 m)	9 3/8 in (0.24 m)	6 ft 7 in (2.01 m)	4.58 s	1.64 s	2.75 s	4.52 s	7.01 s	32.0 in (0.81 m)	10 ft 0 in (3.05 m)
All values from Pro Day

=== Denver Broncos ===
Yassmin went undrafted in the 2024 NFL draft and signed with the Denver Broncos afterwards. He was then selected in the second round (14th overall) in the 2024 CFL global draft by the Hamilton Tiger-Cats two days later. He was assigned the Broncos' exempt/international roster spot as part of the International Player Pathway Program (IPPP).

On 27 August 2024, Yassmin was waived by the Broncos. The next day, he was re-signed to the practice squad. He signed a reserve/future contract with Denver on 13 January 2025. On 12 May, Yassmin was once again waived by the Broncos.

=== Los Angeles Chargers ===
On 7 August 2025, Yassmin signed with the Los Angeles Chargers. He was waived on 26 August as a part of the team's final roster cuts. Yassmin was re-signed to the Chargers' practice squad the following day. On 13 January 2026, he signed a reserve/futures contract with Los Angeles.

=== Green Bay Packers ===
On 28 July 2026, Yassmin signed with the Green Bay Packers. On August 30, he was waived/injured by Green Bay and reverted to injured reserve the next day.
