= Charles Wright (gridiron football) =

American gridiron football player (born 1964)

No. 48, 41, 21, 39, 11
- Position: Defensive back

Personal information
- Born: April 5, 1964 (age 62); Carthage, Missouri, U.S.
- Listed height: 5 ft 9 in (1.75 m)
- Listed weight: 178 lb (81 kg)

Career information
- High school: Carthage (Missouri)
- College: Tulsa
- NFL draft: 1987: 257th round, 10th overall pick

Career history
- St. Louis Cardinals (1987); Dallas Cowboys (1988); Tampa Bay Buccaneers (1988); Cleveland Browns (1990)*; Ottawa Rough Riders (1990–1993); Edmonton Eskimos (1994); Memphis Pharaohs (1996); San Jose SaberCats (1997)
- * Offseason or practice squad member only
- Stats at Pro Football Reference
- Stats at ArenaFan.com

Charles James Wright (born April 5, 1964) is an American former professional football defensive back who played two seasons in the National Football League (NFL) with the St. Louis Cardinals, Dallas Cowboys, and Tampa Bay Buccaneers. He was selected by the Cardinals in the tenth round of the 1987 NFL draft after playing college football at the University of Tulsa. He also played in the Canadian Football League and Arena Football League.

== Early life and college ==
Charles James Wright was born on April 5, 1964, in Carthage, Missouri. He attended Carthage Senior High School in Carthage.

Wright first played college football at Highland Community College and Fort Scott Community College. He then transferred to play for the Tulsa Golden Hurricane of the University of Tulsa from 1985 to 1986. He made four interceptions in 1985 while also returning five punts for 21 yards. In 1986, Wright returned four interceptions for 50 yards and one touchdown and 18 punts for 158 yards.

== Professional career ==
Wright was selected by the St. Louis Cardinals in the tenth round, with the 257th overall pick, of the 1987 NFL draft. He officially signed with the team on July 19. He played in three games for the Cardinals before being released on November 3, 1987.

Wright signed with the Dallas Cowboys on February 2, 1988. He was released on August 30 and re-signed on September 1. He appeared in three games for the Cowboys before being released on September 21, 1988.

Wright was signed by the Tampa Bay Buccaneers on November 16, 1988. He played in two games for Tampa Bay before his release on December 17, 1988.

Wright signed with the Cleveland Browns on March 22, 1990. He was later released on August 23, 1990.

Wrighr dressed in 29 games for the Ottawa Rough Riders of the Canadian Football League (CFL) from 1990 to 1993, recording 70 tackles and eight interceptions. He dressed in two games for the CFL's Edmonton Eskimos in 1994, posting one sack and eight tackles.

Wright signed with the Memphis Pharaohs of the Arena Football League (AFL) on April 8, 1996. He played in all 14 games for Memphis during the 1996 season, totaling 63 solo tackles, 17 assisted tackles, four interceptions, seven pass breakups, and three forced fumbles as the Pharaohs finished 0–14. The Pharaohs became the Portland Forest Dragons after the 1996 season.

On November 22, 1996, Wright, Bret Cooper, and Ramon Luster were traded to the San Jose SaberCats for Ben Bennett, Chris Baus, and Larry Jones. Wright played in one game for the SaberCats in 1997, posting three solo tackles and three assisted tackles.

== Personal life ==
Wright is the brother of gridiron football player Felix Wright.
