= Denzel Daxon =

Gridiron football player (born 1999)

No. 90 – Toronto Argonauts
- Position: Defensive end
- Roster status: Practice roster
- CFL status: Global

Personal information
- Born: March 27, 1999 (age 27); Crooked Island, Bahamas
- Listed height: 6 ft 2 in (1.88 m)
- Listed weight: 320 lb (145 kg)

Career information
- High school: Carol City (Miami, Florida, U.S.)
- College: Ohio (2019–2022); Illinois (2023)
- NFL draft: 2024: undrafted
- CFL draft: 2024G: 2nd round, 16th overall pick

Career history
- Dallas Cowboys (2024)*; Arizona Cardinals (2025)*; Toronto Argonauts (2026–present)
- * Offseason or practice squad member only
- Stats at Pro Football Reference

Denzel Daxon (born 27 March 1999) is a Bahamian professional gridiron football defensive end for the Toronto Argonauts of the Canadian Football League (CFL).

== Early life ==
He grew up on Crooked Island, Bahamas where he attended the Crooked Island All Age School.

He moved to the Miami area of Florida at the age of 17 years-old and attended Miami Carol City Senior High School. He received offers to attend University of Florida and University of Louisville amongst others, before ultimately choosing to attend Ohio University.

== College career ==
He played for Ohio for two seasons prior entering the transfer portal of January 2023; he received all-MAC honours in 2021.

In his final year of eligibility for Illinois in 2023, he played all 12 games with 11 starts at nose tackle. In those games, he registered 27 tackles while having achieved three or more tackles in seven games. Across his college career, he played 36 games for Ohio and Illinois with a combined 38 total tackles, three tackles for loss, and a sack.

== Professional career ==
Pre-draft measurables
Height	Weight	Arm length	Hand span	Wingspan	40-yard dash	10-yard split	20-yard split	20-yard shuttle	Three-cone drill	Vertical jump	Broad jump	Bench press
6 ft 2 in (1.88 m)	318 lb (144 kg)	33 3/8 in (0.85 m)	10 1/4 in (0.26 m)	6 ft 9 3/8 in (2.07 m)	5.51 s	1.81 s	3.12 s	4.90 s	8.34 s	31.0 in (0.79 m)	8 ft 3 in (2.51 m)	22 reps
All values from Pro Day

=== Dallas Cowboys ===
He went undrafted in the 2024 NFL draft and was selected in the second round (16th overall) in the 2024 CFL global draft by the Toronto Argonauts. He signed as an undrafted free agent for the Dallas Cowboys in April 2024. He appeared in three preseason games for the Cowboys and finished with seven tackles and a half sack. He was waived by Dallas in August 2024. Shortly afterwards, he was signed to Dallas Cowboys practice squad on an three-year international development contract. It was reported that the Cowboys were initially unaware of his eligibility for the International Player Pathway when he was first signed.

Daxon signed a reserve/future contract on January 6, 2025. On August 25, Daxon was waived by the Cowboys.

=== Arizona Cardinals ===
On September 2, 2025, Daxon signed with the Arizona Cardinals practice squad.

=== Toronto Argonauts ===
Daxon signed with the Toronto Argonauts of the Canadian Football League on May 4, 2026.
