= Ron Tiavaasue =

Gridiron football player (born 1997)

Profile
- Position: Fullback

Personal information
- Born: 19 November 1997 (age 28); Motoʻotua, Samoa
- Listed height: 6 ft 4 in (1.93 m)
- Listed weight: 275 lb (125 kg)

Career information
- High school: Akid Secondary School
- College: Snow (2018–2019); Missouri State (2020–2021); Utah State (2022); New Mexico State (2023)
- CFL draft: 2024G: 1st round, 4th overall pick

Career history
- 2024: Calgary Stampeders
- Stats at CFL.ca

Ron Tiavaasue (born 19 November 1997) is a Samoan–New Zealand professional gridiron football fullback who is a free agent. He was most recently a member of the Calgary Stampeders of the Canadian Football League (CFL). He played college football for the Snow Badgers, Missouri State Bears, Utah State Aggies and New Mexico State Aggies. He was selected by the Stampeders in the first round (fourth overall) of the 2024 CFL global draft.

== Early life ==
Tiavaasue was born on 19 November 1997 in Samoa. He grew up in Auckland, New Zealand, and played rugby and later switched to American Football, where he earned Team MVP honors from the Auckland Colts U-20 Team. He attended Akid Secondary School. In 2018, he attended a camp in Australia and was noticed by football coach Andrew Mitchell.

== College career ==
Mitchell convinced Tiavaasue to move to the United States to play for the Snow Badgers of Snow College in Utah, where Mitchell was head coach. He enrolled at the school in 2018. A tight end, he appeared in nine games during the 2018 season, recording four catches for 20 yards, and then caught 12 passes for 84 yards and a touchdown in three games in the 2019 season. He committed to the North Texas Mean Green following his second year at Snow, but later de-committed.

Tiavaasue ultimately transferred to the Missouri State Bears for the 2020 season. In two seasons there, he appeared in 19 games (eight as a starter) and caught 21 passes for 247 yards and two touchdowns, with a career-high 14 catches for 173 yards and two touchdowns in the 2021 season. He transferred to the Utah State Aggies in 2022. He saw minimal playing time in four games with the Aggies, with one tackle being his only statistic. He transferred for his final collegiate season in 2023 to the New Mexico State Aggies. In his last year, he caught three passes for 44 yards and ran twice for 24 yards, including scoring his only touchdown of the season on a 10-yard catch in the 2023 Conference USA Football Championship Game.

== Professional career ==
Tiavaasue was not selected in the 2024 NFL draft; he attended rookie mini-camp with the Jacksonville Jaguars, but was not signed. He was selected in the first round (fourth overall) of the 2024 CFL global draft by the Calgary Stampeders and signed with the team on 23 May 2024, to play fullback. He made his CFL debut on 15 August against the Ottawa Redblacks, catching one pass for nine yards. He played in one regular season game while spending the rest of the season on the practice roster where his contract expired on 27 October 2024.
