= Charles Wiley (Canadian football) =

American gridiron football player (born 1998)

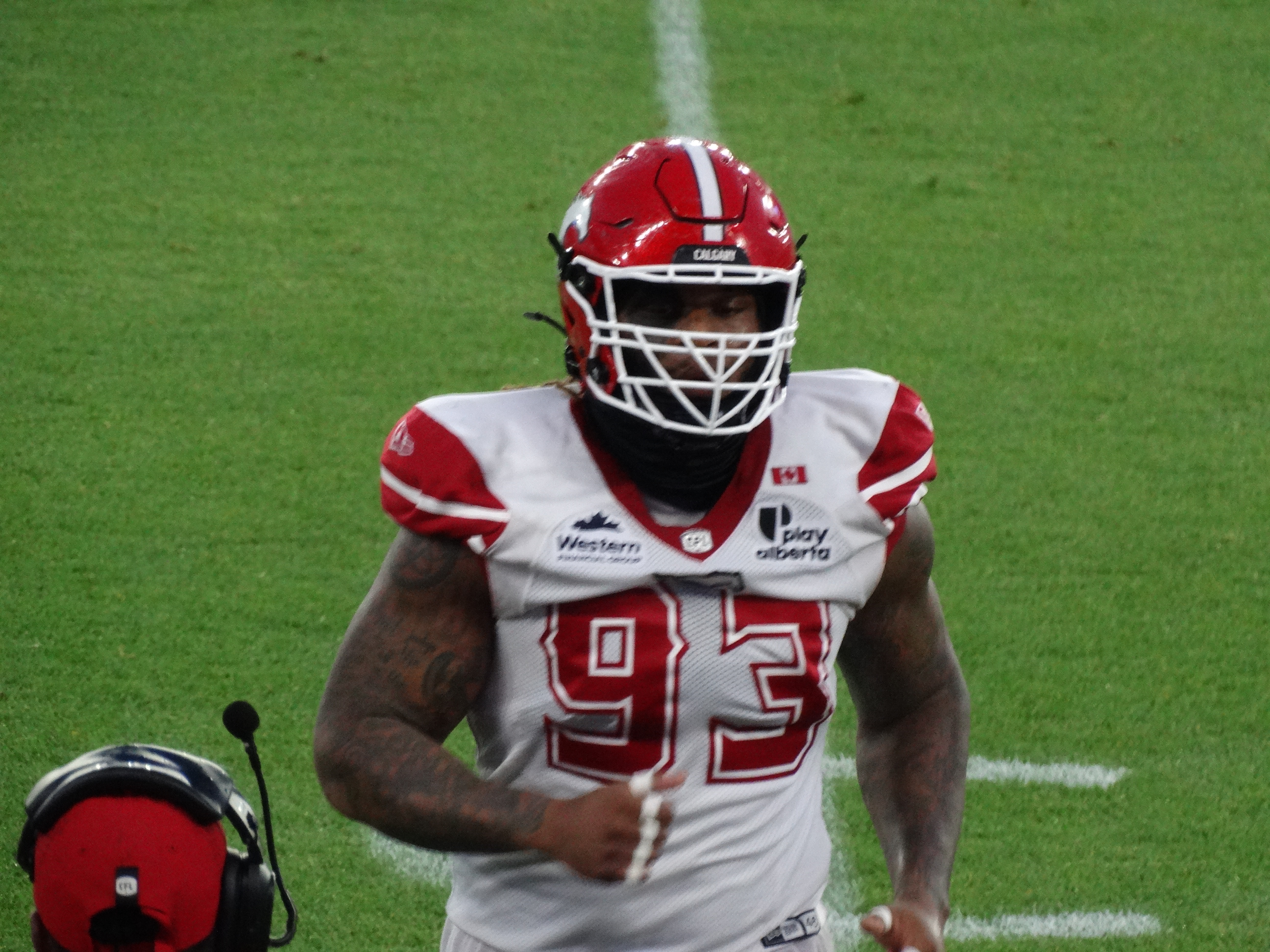
- Wiley with the Calgary Stampeders in 2026

No. 93 – Calgary Stampeders
- Position: Defensive lineman
- Roster status: Active
- CFL status: American

Personal information
- Born: May 18, 1998 (age 28); Stockbridge, Georgia, U.S.
- Listed height: 6 ft 3 in (1.91 m)
- Listed weight: 272 lb (123 kg)

Career information
- High school: Stockbridge (Stockbridge, Georgia)
- College: Ole Miss (2017–2019); UTSA (2020–2021)
- NFL draft: 2022: undrafted

Career history
- Baltimore Ravens (2022)*; New York Giants (2022)*; Houston Roughnecks (2023); Cleveland Browns (2023)*; Calgary Stampeders (2024–present)
- * Offseason or practice squad member only

Career CFL statistics as of 2026
- Total tackles: 45
- Sacks: 12
- Stats at CFL.ca
- Stats at Pro Football Reference

Charles A. Wiley (born May 18, 1998) is an American professional football defensive lineman for the Calgary Stampeders of the Canadian Football League (CFL). Wiley played college football for the Ole Miss Rebels and the UTSA Roadrunners. He also had stints in the National Football League (NFL) with the Baltimore Ravens, New York Giants and Cleveland Browns and in the XFL with the Houston Roughnecks.

== College career ==
Wiley played college football for the Ole Miss Rebels from 2016 to 2019 and the UTSA Roadrunners from 2020 to 2021. He appeared in 33 games for Ole Miss, making 57 tackles, including 12 tackles for loss and 5.5 sacks. Wiley transferred to UTSA for his last two years of eligibility, dressing in 26 games. He logged 79 tackles, including 19 tackles for loss, 5.5 sacks, two pass breakups and three fumble recoveries. One of those fumbles he recovered was returned for a touchdown against Lamar in a blowout win.

== Professional career ==
Pre-draft measurables
Height	Weight	Arm length	Hand span	Wingspan	40-yard dash	10-yard split	20-yard split	20-yard shuttle	Three-cone drill	Vertical jump	Broad jump	Bench press
6 ft 2 1/8 in (1.88 m)	251 lb (114 kg)	32 7/8 in (0.84 m)	9 1/8 in (0.23 m)	6 ft 6 5/8 in (2.00 m)	4.53 s	1.55 s	2.63 s	4.47 s	7.61 s	33.5 in (0.85 m)	9 ft 11 in (3.02 m)	27 reps
All values from Pro Day

=== Baltimore Ravens ===
After not being selected in the 2022 NFL draft, Wiley signed with the Baltimore Ravens as an undrafted free agent. He was waived on August 30.

=== New York Giants ===
On August 31, the New York Giants signed Wiley to the practice squad. He was released on September 27.

=== Houston Roughnecks ===
Wiley signed with the Houston Roughnecks of the XFL on February 1, 2023. He played in seven games, recording six tackles and one sack. He was released on August 6 when he was called up to the NFL.

=== Cleveland Browns ===
On August 7, it was announced that the Cleveland Browns signed Wiley. He was waived on August 24.

=== Calgary Stampeders ===
On January 29, 2024, Wiley signed with the Calgary Stampeders of the CFL. He made his first start against the Hamilton Tiger-Cats on June 7. Wiley registered his first sack against the Winnipeg Blue Bombers on July 12, when he took down Zach Collaros. At the end of his rookie campaign, he played in ten games, making 13 tackles and two sacks.
