= Kaylyn St-Cyr =

Canadian football player (born 1998)

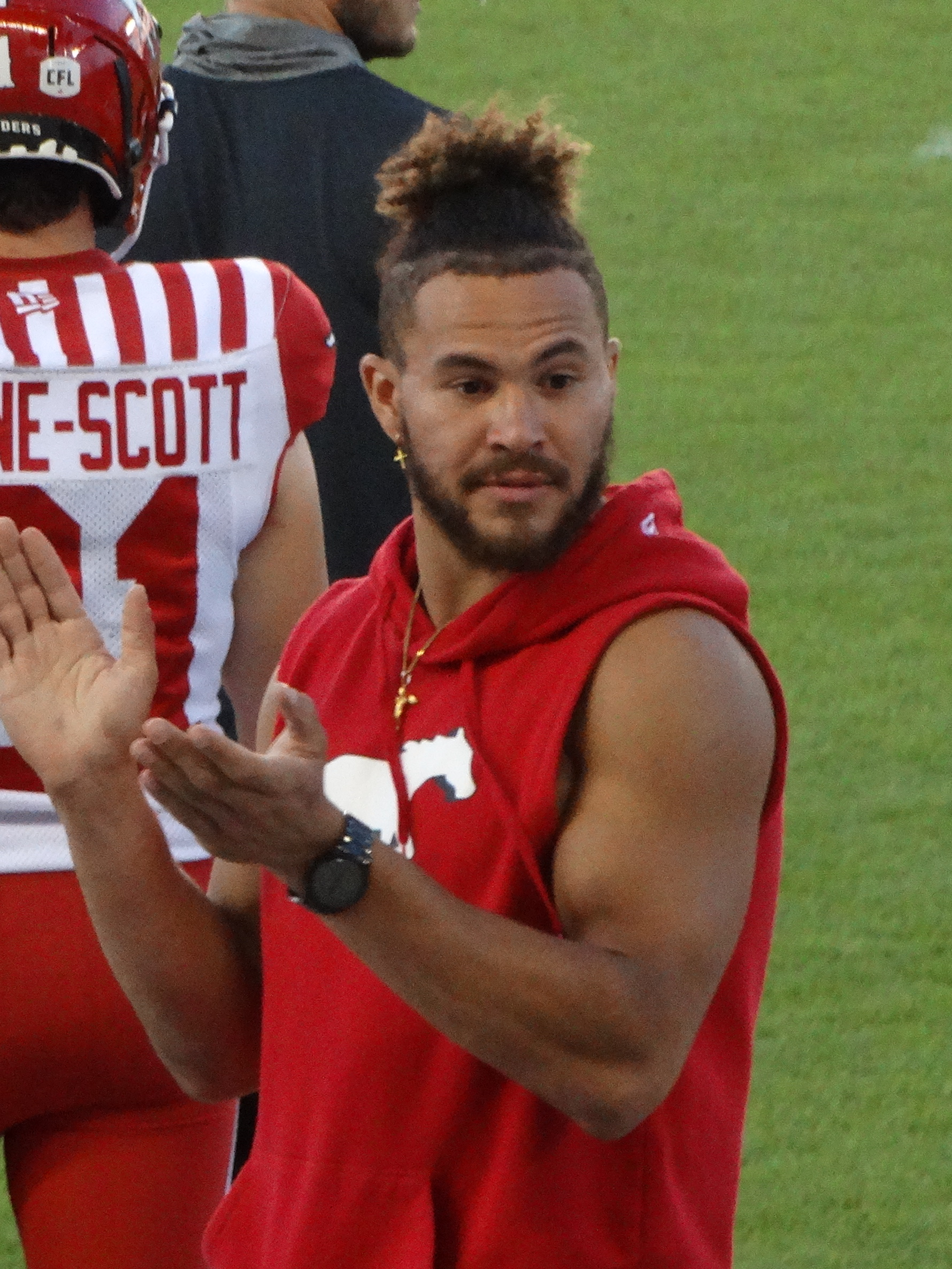
- St-Cyr with the Calgary Stampeders in 2024

Profile
- Position: Linebacker

Personal information
- Born: June 20, 1998 (age 28); La Prairie, Quebec, Canada
- Listed height: 5 ft 11 in (1.80 m)
- Listed weight: 206 lb (93 kg)

Career information
- University: Montreal (2019–2023)
- CFL draft: 2024: 8th round, 69th overall pick

Career history
- Calgary Stampeders (2024–2025)

Awards and highlights
- Vanier Cup champion (2023); First-team All-Canadian (2023); Second-team All-Canadian (2022); 3× RSEQ All-Star (2021–2023)
- Stats at CFL.ca

Kaylyn St-Cyr (born June 20, 1998) is a Canadian professional football linebacker. He played U Sports football at Montreal.

== Early life ==
Kaylyn St-Cyr was born on June 20, 1998, in La Prairie, Quebec. He played CEGEP football at Vanier College.

St-Cyr played U Sports football for the Montreal Carabins of the Université de Montréal in 2019 and from 2021 to 2023. The 2020 season was cancelled due to the COVID-19 pandemic. He was a RSEQ All-Star each year from 2021 to 2023. St-Cyr earned second-team All-Canadian honors in 2022 and first-team All-Canadian honors in 2023. He was named the MVP of the 2023 Dunsmore Cup. St-Cyr helped the Carabins win the 58th Vanier Cup in 2023.

== Professional career ==
Pre-draft measurables
Height	Weight	40-yard dash	20-yard shuttle	Three-cone drill	Vertical jump	Broad jump	Bench press
5 ft 11 1/4 in (1.81 m)	206 lb (93 kg)	4.73 s	4.25 s	7.08 s	33.5 in (0.85 m)	9 ft 9 1/2 in (2.98 m)	15 reps
All values from CFL Combine

St-Cyr was selected by the Calgary Stampeders in the eighth round, with the 69th overall pick, of the 2024 CFL draft. He officially signed with the team on May 6, 2024. He was moved to the practice roster on June 2, promoted to the active roster on July 5, moved back to the practice roster on August 8, promoted to the active roster again on August 14, and placed on the six-game injured list on September 6, 2024. St-Cyr dressed in seven games overall during the 2024 season and posted nine special teams tackles.

On May 13, 2026, St-Cyr was released by the Stampeders.

== Personal life ==
St-Cyr founded a clothing line called Hurtliche. He works as a substitute teacher during the CFL offseasons.
