= David Olajiga =

British American football player (born 1997)

No. 65 – Baltimore Ravens
- Position: Defensive end
- Roster status: Practice squad

Personal information
- Born: 3 November 1997 (age 29); London, England
- Listed height: 6 ft 3 in (1.91 m)
- Listed weight: 310 lb (141 kg)

Career information
- High school: The John Fisher School
- College: Butler CC (KS) (2020); Central Missouri (2021–2023)
- NFL draft: 2024: undrafted
- CFL draft: 2024G: 2nd round, 10th overall pick

Career history
- Los Angeles Rams (2024)*; New England Patriots (2025)*; Baltimore Ravens (2025–present)
- * Offseason or practice squad member only
- Stats at Pro Football Reference

David Olajiga (born 3 November 1997) is an English professional American football defensive end for the Baltimore Ravens of the National Football League (NFL). He played college football for the Butler Grizzlies and Central Missouri Mules.

== College career ==
=== Butler CC ===
Olajiga was recruited to Butler as a tight end and appeared in one game for the Grizzlies before transferring.

=== Central Missouri ===
During his final season with the Mules, Olajiga posted 41 total tackles and 4 sacks.

== Professional career ==
Pre-draft measurables
Height	Weight	Arm length	Hand span	Wingspan	40-yard dash	10-yard split	20-yard split	20-yard shuttle	Three-cone drill	Vertical jump	Broad jump	Bench press
6 ft 2 5/8 in (1.90 m)	319 lb (145 kg)	31 7/8 in (0.81 m)	10 1/2 in (0.27 m)	6 ft 7 3/4 in (2.03 m)	5.12 s	1.83 s	3.00 s	5.00 s	8.16 s	34.0 in (0.86 m)	8 ft 2 in (2.49 m)	30 reps
All values from Pro Day

Olajiga went undrafted in the 2024 NFL draft but was selected in the second round (tenth overall) in the 2024 CFL global draft by the Edmonton Elks.

=== Los Angeles Rams ===
On August 28, 2024, Olajiga was signed to the Los Angeles Rams' practice squad. He occupied a 17th seat on the practice squad as a member of the International Player Pathway. He signed a reserve/future contract with the team on January 20, 2025. On May 7, Olajiga was waived by the Rams.

=== New England Patriots ===
On July 20, 2025, Olajiga signed with the New England Patriots as part of the International Pathway Program. He was waived on August 26, 2025 as part of final roster cuts. Olajiga joined the practice squad the next day. On October 16, 2025, Olajiga was released from the practice squad.

=== Baltimore Ravens ===
On October 21, 2025, Olajiga signed with the Baltimore Ravens as part of the International Pathway Program. He signed a reserve/future contract with Baltimore on January 5, 2026. On August 30, Olajiga was waived by the Ravens as a part of final roster cuts; he was re-signed to the team's practice squad the next day.
