= George Idoko =

Canadian football player (born 2000)

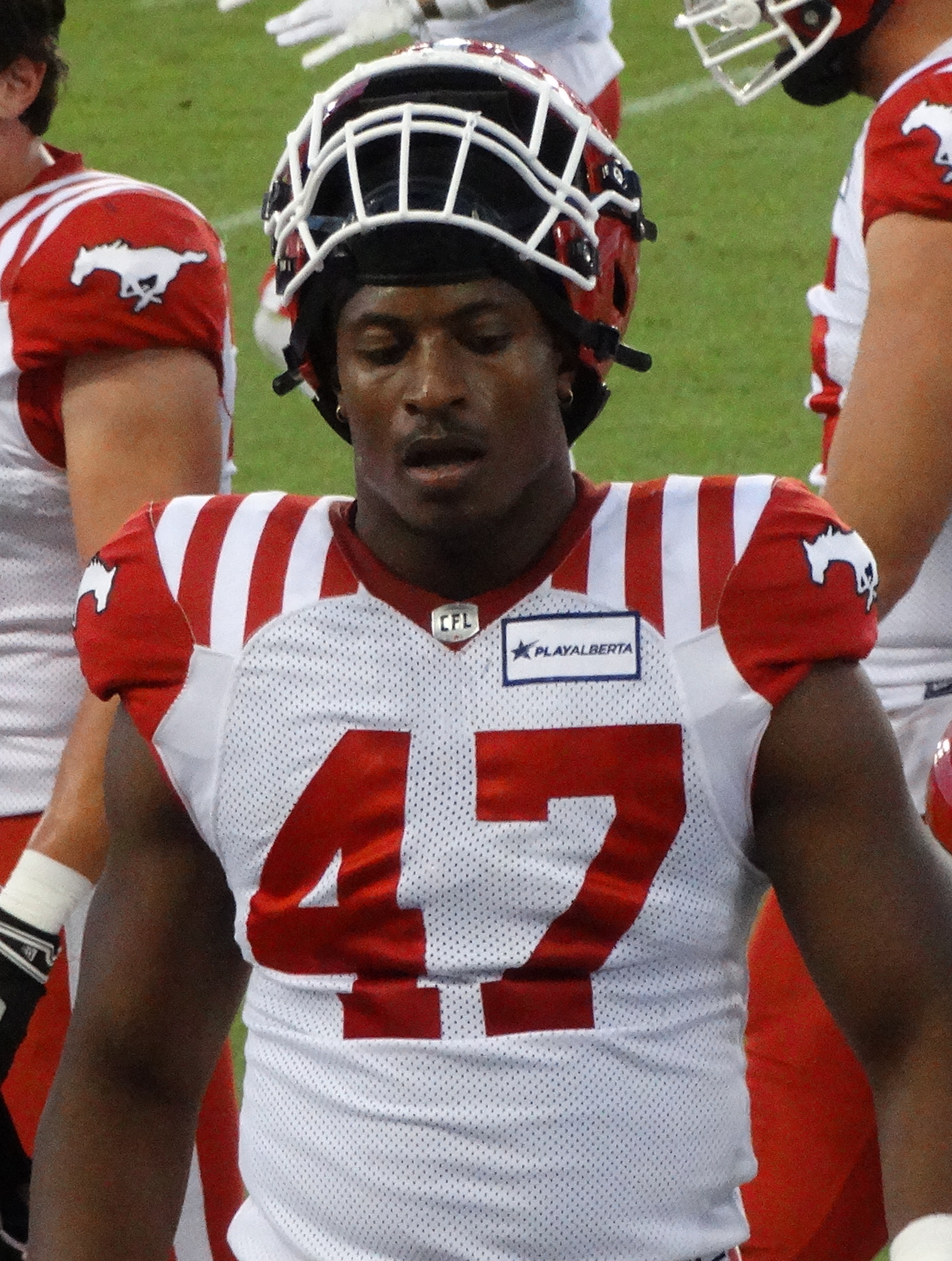
- Idoko with the Calgary Stampeders in 2024

No. 47 – Calgary Stampeders
- Position: Defensive lineman
- Roster status: Active
- CFL status: National

Personal information
- Born: August 25, 2000 (age 26)
- Listed height: 6 ft 1 in (1.85 m)
- Listed weight: 228 lb (103 kg)

Career information
- High school: Saint Francis (Calgary, Alberta)
- University: Saskatchewan
- CFL draft: 2024: 3rd round, 28th overall pick

Career history
- Calgary Stampeders (2024–present)

Awards and highlights
- Canada West All-Star (2023); Second-team All-Canadian (2023)
- Stats at CFL.ca

George Idoko (born August 25, 2000) is a Canadian professional football defensive lineman for the Calgary Stampeders of the Canadian Football League (CFL). He played U Sports football at the University of Saskatchewan.

== Early life ==
George Idoko was born on August 25, 2000. He did not play football until Grade 10 at Saint Francis High School in Calgary. He grew up a Calgary Stampeders fan. Idoko was named Saint Francis High's defensive lineman of the year in both 2015 and 2017. He also played basketball in high school.

== University career ==
Idoko was a member of the Calgary Dinos football team of the University of Calgary in 2018. However, he did not play any for the Dinos.

In 2019, Idoko transferred to play for the Saskatchewan Huskies of the University of Saskatchewan. He played in nine games during the 2019 season, posting one solo tackle and one assisted tackle. The 2020 season was cancelled due to the COVID-19 pandemic. He appeared in ten games in 2021, recording seven solo tackles and one assisted tackles. In 2022, Idoko appeared in 12 games while posting 12 solo tackles, 13 assisted tackles, one sack, two forced fumbles, one pass breakup, and one blocked kick. He played in nine games as a senior in 2023, recording 14 solo tackles, seven assisted tackles, and three sacks. He was named a Canada West All-Star for his performance during the 2023 season. Idoko earned U Sports Academic All-Canadian honors during the 2020 and 2021 seasons. He majored in arts and science at the University of Saskatchewan.

== Professional career ==
Pre-draft measurables
Height	Weight	40-yard dash	20-yard shuttle	Three-cone drill	Vertical jump	Broad jump	Bench press
6 ft 1 1/2 in (1.87 m)	224 lb (102 kg)	4.80 s	4.64 s	7.68 s	33.5 in (0.85 m)	9 ft 3 1/8 in (2.82 m)	15 reps
All values from CFL Combine

Idoko was selected by the Calgary Stampeders in the third round, with the 28th overall pick, of the 2024 CFL draft. He officially signed with the team on May 2, 2024. He was moved to the practice roster on June 2, promoted to the active roster on June 28, moved back to the practice roster on September 1, and promoted back to the active roster again on September 2, 2024. Idoko dressed in 16 games overall during the 2024 season, posting one defensive tackle and four special teams tackles.
