= Carytown, Missouri =

- City
- Location of Carytown, Missouri
- Coordinates: 37°15′42″N 94°20′04″W
- Country: United States
- State: Missouri
- County: Jasper

Area
  - Total: 14.43 sq mi (37.38 km^{2})
  - Land: 14.43 sq mi (37.38 km^{2})
  - Water: 0 sq mi (0.00 km^{2})
- Elevation: 951 ft (290 m)

Population (2020)
  - Total: 287
  - Density: 19.9/sq mi (7.68/km^{2})
- Time zone: UTC-6 (Central (CST))
  - Summer (DST): UTC-5 (CDT)
- ZIP code: 64836
- Area code: 417
- FIPS code: 29-11728
- GNIS feature ID: 2393763
- Website: carytownmo.com

Carytown is a village in Jasper County, Missouri, United States. The population was 287 at the 2020 census. It is part of the Joplin, Missouri Metropolitan Statistical Area.

== History ==
A post office called Carytown was established in 1885, and remained in operation until 1901. The community has the name of the Cary family, original owners of the site.

== Geography ==
According to the United States Census Bureau, the city has a total area of 14.46 square miles (37.45 km^{2}), all land.

== Demographics ==
Historical population
Census	Pop.	Note	%±
1970	117		—
1980	150		28.2%
1990	149		−0.7%
2000	217		45.6%
2010	271		24.9%
2020	287		5.9%
U.S. Decennial Census

=== 2010 census ===
As of the census of 2010, there were 271 people, 99 households, and 81 families living in the city. The population density was 18.7 inhabitants per square mile (7.2/km^{2}). There were 109 housing units at an average density of 7.5 per square mile (2.9/km^{2}). The racial makeup of the city was 95.6% White, 3.7% from other races, and 0.7% from two or more races. Hispanic or Latino of any race were 5.5% of the population.

There were 99 households, of which 33.3% had children under the age of 18 living with them, 73.7% were married couples living together, 3.0% had a female householder with no husband present, 5.1% had a male householder with no wife present, and 18.2% were non-families. 16.2% of all households were made up of individuals, and 7% had someone living alone who was 65 years of age or older. The average household size was 2.74 and the average family size was 3.04.

The median age in the city was 40.9 years. 26.2% of residents were under the age of 18; 4.1% were between the ages of 18 and 24; 22.6% were from 25 to 44; 32.1% were from 45 to 64; and 15.1% were 65 years of age or older. The gender makeup of the city was 53.9% male and 46.1% female.

=== 2000 census ===
As of the census of 2000, there were 217 people, 85 households, and 69 families living in the city. The population density was 15.1 inhabitants per square mile (5.8/km^{2}). There were 94 housing units at an average density of 6.5 per square mile (2.5/km^{2}). The racial makeup of the city was 95.39% White, 1.38% Native American, and 3.23% from two or more races. Hispanic or Latino of any race were 1.38% of the population.

There were 85 households, out of which 27.1% had children under the age of 18 living with them, 71.8% were married couples living together, 4.7% had a female householder with no husband present, and 18.8% were non-families. 16.5% of all households were made up of individuals, and 7.1% had someone living alone who was 65 years of age or older. The average household size was 2.55 and the average family size was 2.80.

In the city the population was spread out, with 17.1% under the age of 18, 10.6% from 18 to 24, 29.5% from 25 to 44, 30.4% from 45 to 64, and 12.4% who were 65 years of age or older. The median age was 41 years. For every 100 females, there were 114.9 males. For every 100 females age 18 and over, there were 109.3 males.

The median income for a household in the city was $27,292, and the median income for a family was $30,000. Males had a median income of $23,125 versus $20,313 for females. The per capita income for the city was $13,852. About 7.4% of families and 7.8% of the population were below the poverty line, including 14.3% of those under the age of eighteen and 17.9% of those 65 or over.

== Education ==
The northern portion is in the Jasper County R-V School District. The southern portion is in the Carthage R-IX School District. The comprehensive high school of the Carthage district is Carthage Senior High School.
