= Eteva Mauga-Clements =

American Samoan gridiron football player (born 1999)

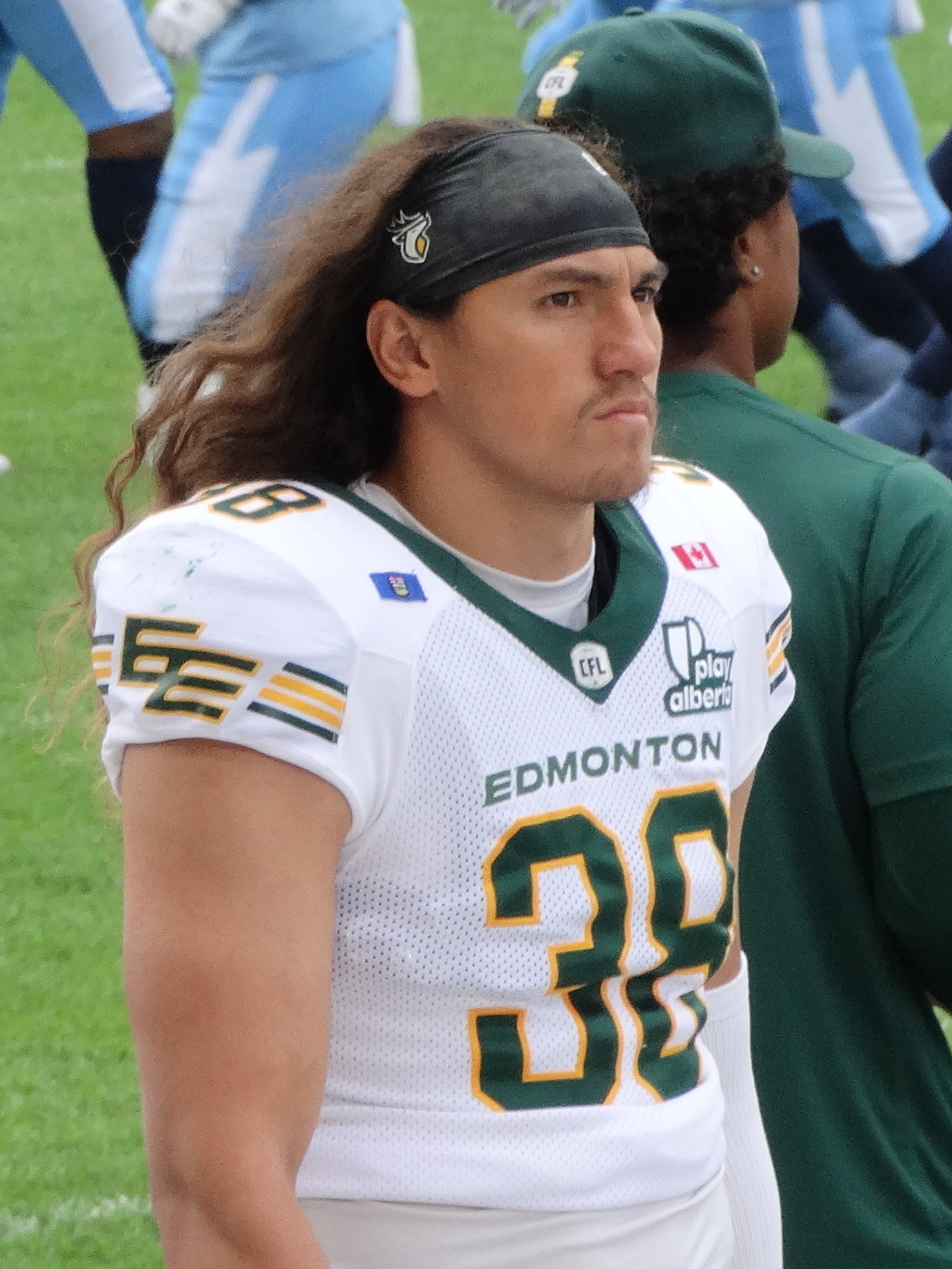
- Mauga-Clements with the Edmonton Elks in 2025

No. 38 – Edmonton Elks
- Position: Linebacker
- Roster status: Active
- CFL status: Global

Personal information
- Born: May 16, 1999 (age 27); American Samoa
- Listed height: 6 ft 1 in (1.85 m)
- Listed weight: 220 lb (100 kg)

Career information
- High school: College Park (Pleasant Hill, California, U.S.)
- College: Nebraska
- CFL draft: 2024G: 1st round, 1st overall pick

Career history
- Vegas Knight Hawks (2024)*; Edmonton Elks (2024–present)
- * Offseason or practice squad member only

Awards and highlights
- Grey Cup champion (2026)

Career CFL statistics as of 2026
- Total tackles: 29
- Sacks: 1
- Forced fumbles: 2
- Interceptions: 1
- Stats at CFL.ca

Sinaleeteva Fuifui "Eteva" Mauga-Clements (born May 16, 1999) is an American Samoan professional gridiron football linebacker for the Edmonton Elks of the Canadian Football League (CFL). He played college football at Diablo Valley and Nebraska.

== Early life ==
Sinaleeteva Fuifui Mauga-Clements was born in American Samoa. He moved to the United States to attend College Park High School in Pleasant Hill, California.

== College career ==
Mauga-Clements first played college football at Diablo Valley College from 2018 to 2019. He recorded 61 tackles, 7.0 sacks, one forced fumble, and two blocked kicks in 2019, earning Bay 6 Conference Defensive Player of the Year honors.

He transferred to play for the Nebraska Cornhuskers from 2020 to 2022. In the COVID-19 shortened 2020 season, Mauga-Clements played in all eight games, primarily on special teams, and made one tackle. He appeared in all 12 games in 2021, totaling five tackles and one pass breakup. He played in all 12 games, starting two, during the 2022 season, accumulating 39 tackles, one sack, and one forced fumble. Mauga-Clements was named Academic All-Big Ten in both 2021 and 2022. He graduated with a criminology and criminal justice degree in December 2021.

== Professional career ==
Mauga-Clements had briefly signed with the Vegas Knight Hawks of the Indoor Football League before deciding to pursue a career in the Canadian Football League (CFL).

He was selected by the Edmonton Elks with the first overall pick in the 2024 CFL global draft. He officially signed with the team on May 6, 2024.
