= 2024 CFL global draft =

Canadian football draft

General information
- Sport: Canadian football
- Date: April 30, 2024
- Time: 11:00 am EDT
- Location: Toronto

Overview
- 18 total selections in 2 rounds
- League: CFL
- First selection: Eteva Mauga-Clements, Edmonton Elks
- U Sports selections: 0
- NCAA selections: 15

The 2024 CFL global draft was a selection of non-Canadian and non-American players by Canadian Football League (CFL) teams that took place on April 30, 2024, at 11:00 am ET. It was the fourth CFL draft that pooled all of the global players together after previously having separate drafts for Mexican players and European players in 2019.

== Draft format ==
As per the league's draft tracker, the draft featured two rounds with a total of 18 selections. This was the first season where the league did not alter the format of the global draft from the prior year. The draft order was based on the waiver priority (reverse standings from the previous year).

== Draft order ==
=== Round one ===
Pick #	CFL team	Player	Position	University/club	Nationality
1	Edmonton Elks	Eteva Mauga-Clements	LB	Nebraska	American Samoa
2	Ottawa Redblacks	Matt Hayball	P	Vanderbilt	Australia
3	Saskatchewan Roughriders	Tyrone Taleni	DL	Southern California	Samoa
4	Calgary Stampeders	Ron Tiavaasue	TE	New Mexico State	New Zealand
5	Hamilton Tiger-Cats	Nik Constantinou	P	Texas A&M	Australia
6	BC Lions	Carl Meyer	K	None	South Africa
7	Toronto Argonauts	Jeremy Edwards	P	Eastern Kentucky	Australia
8	Winnipeg Blue Bombers	Fabian Weitz	LB	Cologne Centurions	Germany
9	Montreal Alouettes	Sam Clark	P	James Madison	Australia

=== Round two ===
Pick #	CFL team	Player	Position	University/club	Nationality
10	Edmonton Elks	David Olajiga	DL	Central Missouri	United Kingdom
11	Ottawa Redblacks	Heston Lameta	LB	Northern Arizona	American Samoa
12	Saskatchewan Roughriders	Jordy Sandy	P	Texas Christian	Australia
13	Calgary Stampeders	Julius Welschof	DL	Charlotte	Germany
14	Hamilton Tiger-Cats	Thomas Yassmin	TE	Utah	Australia
15	BC Lions	Tory Taylor	P	Iowa	Australia
16	Toronto Argonauts	Denzel Daxon	DL	Illinois	Bahamas
17	Winnipeg Blue Bombers	Lucky Ogbevoen	DB	Raiders Tirol	Austria
18	Montreal Alouettes	Nouredin Nouili	OL	Nebraska	Germany

== Trades ==
In the explanations below, (D) denotes trades that took place during the draft, while (PD) indicates trades completed pre-draft.

- None

== See also ==
- 2024 CFL draft
