= 2026 Winnipeg Blue Bombers season =

CFL team season

- General manager: Kyle Walters
- President: Wade Miller
- Head coach: Mike O'Shea
- Home stadium: Princess Auto Stadium

Results
- Record: 9–9
- Division place: 4th, West
- Playoffs: Lost East Final
- Team MOP: Brady Oliveira
- Team MODP: Evan Holm
- Team MOC: Brady Oliveira
- Team MOOL: Jarell Broxton
- Team MOST: Trey Vaval
- Team MOR: Major Williams

Uniform
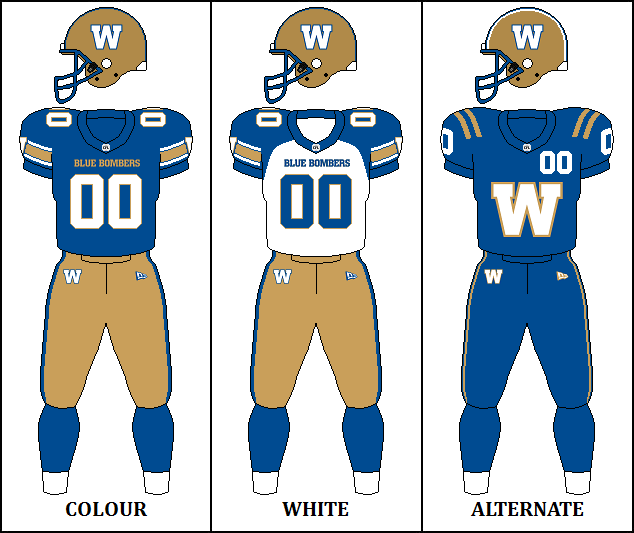

The 2026 Winnipeg Blue Bombers season was the 68th season for the team in the Canadian Football League (CFL) and their 93rd season overall. The Blue Bombers qualifed for the playoffs for the ninth consecutive season but lost in the East Final to the Montreal Alouettes. The team played ten home games this season with the Toronto Argonauts deferring one of their home games due to the 2026 FIFA World Cup.

The 2026 CFL season was the 12th season under head coach Mike O'Shea and the 12th full season under general manager Kyle Walters.

== Offseason ==
=== CFL Canadian draft ===
The 2026 CFL draft took place on April 28, 2026. The Blue Bombers had nine selections in the eight-round draft. Not including traded picks or forfeitures, the team selected fourth in each round of the draft after finishing sixth in the 2025 league standings.

Round	Pick	Player	Position	University Team
1	4	Nuer Gatkuoth	DL	Wake Forest
2	10	Dante Daniels	TE	North Carolina State
2	20	Kevin Cline	OL	Boston College
3	24	Charles-Elliot Bouliane	LB	Montreal
4	33	Ethan Stuart	DB	McMaster
5	42	Brody Clark	LB	York
6	51	Ben Britton	WR	Calgary
7	60	Josh Jack	WR	Saint Mary's
8	69	Brady Lidster	K	Windsor

=== CFL global draft ===
The 2026 CFL global draft took place on April 29, 2026. The Blue Bombers had two selections in the draft, holding the fourth pick in each round.

Round	Pick	Player	Position	School	Nationality
1	4	Edward Vesterinen	DL	West Virginia	Finland
2	13	Keegan Andrews	P	Massachusetts	Australia

== Preseason ==
=== Schedule ===
Week	Game	Date	Kickoff	Opponent	Results		TV	Venue	Attendance	Summary
Week	Game	Date	Kickoff	Opponent	Score	Record	TV	Venue	Attendance	Summary
A	Bye									
B	1	Sat, May 23	6:00 p.m. CDT	at Saskatchewan Roughriders	L 27–31	0–1	CFL+	Griffiths Stadium	7,654	Recap
C	2	Fri, May 29	7:30 p.m. CDT	vs. BC Lions	L 19–30	0–2	CFL+	Princess Auto Stadium	26,269	Recap

# Games played with white uniforms.

== Regular season ==
=== Standings ===
West Division
Team	GP	W	L	Pts	PF	PA	Div	Stk	
Edmonton Elks	18	13	5	26	541	435	7–3	L1	Details
BC Lions	18	10	8	20	516	484	5–5	L2	Details
Saskatchewan Roughriders	18	10	8	20	486	473	5–5	W2	Details
Winnipeg Blue Bombers	18	9	9	18	475	492	4–6	W1	Details
Calgary Stampeders	18	9	9	18	632	587	4–6	W1	Details

=== Schedule ===
Week	Game	Date	Kickoff	Opponent	Results		TV	Venue	Attendance	Summary
Week	Game	Date	Kickoff	Opponent	Score	Record	TV	Venue	Attendance	Summary
1	1	Fri, June 5	8:00 p.m. CDT	at Calgary Stampeders	W 30–28	1–0	TSN/CBSSN	McMahon Stadium	17,743	Recap
2	2	Thu, June 11	7:30 p.m. CDT	vs. Hamilton Tiger-Cats	L 27–37	1–1	TSN/RDS2/CBSSN	Princess Auto Stadium	32,343	Recap
3	Bye									
4	3	Thu, June 25	7:30 p.m. CDT	vs. Edmonton Elks	L 18–23	1–2	TSN	Princess Auto Stadium	32,343	Recap
5	4	Sun, July 5	6:00 p.m. CDT	at Hamilton Tiger-Cats	W 14–13	2–2	TSN/CBSSN	Hamilton Stadium	20,189	Recap
6	5	Fri, July 10	7:30 p.m. CDT	vs. Toronto Argonauts	W 30–21	3–2	TSN/RDS	Princess Auto Stadium	32,134	Recap
7	6	Sun, July 19	6:00 p.m. CDT	at Ottawa Redblacks	W 36–34 (4OT)	4–2	TSN/RDS2/CBSSN	TD Place Stadium	14,148	Recap
8	7	Fri, July 24	7:30 p.m. CDT	vs. Calgary Stampeders	L 30–52	4–3	TSN/RDS2	Princess Auto Stadium	32,343	Recap
9	8	Thu, July 30	7:30 p.m. CDT	vs. BC Lions	L 19–35	4–4	TSN/RDS	Princess Auto Stadium	31,509	Recap
10	Bye									
11	9	Fri, Aug 14	7:30 p.m. CDT	vs. Ottawa Redblacks	W 33–21	5–4	TSN/RDS2	Princess Auto Stadium	31,312	Recap
12	10	Fri, Aug 21	8:30 p.m. CDT	at Edmonton Elks	L 19–22	5–5	TSN/CBSSN	Commonwealth Stadium	22,805	Recap
13	11	Fri, Aug 28	7:30 p.m. CDT	vs. Montreal Alouettes	W 44–28	6–5	TSN/RDS	Princess Auto Stadium	32,343	Recap
14	12	Sun, Sept 6	6:00 p.m. CDT	at Saskatchewan Roughriders	L 26–32 (OT)	6–6	TSN/CBSSN	Mosaic Stadium	34,352	Recap
15	13	Sat, Sept 12	3:00 p.m. CDT	vs. Saskatchewan Roughriders	W 19–6	7–6	TSN/CTV	Princess Auto Stadium	32,343	Recap
16	Bye									
17	14	Fri, Sept 25	7:00 p.m. CDT	vs. Toronto Argonauts	L 28–30	7–7	TSN/RDS/CBSSN	Princess Auto Stadium	32,343	Recap
18	15	Sat, Oct 3	6:00 p.m. CDT	at Montreal Alouettes	L 10–37	7–8	TSN/RDS	Molson Stadium	23,035	Recap
19	16	Sat, Oct 10	6:00 p.m. CDT	vs. Calgary Stampeders	W 33–28	8–8	TSN	Princess Auto Stadium	32,343	Recap
20	17	Fri, Oct 16	8:30 p.m. CDT	at Edmonton Elks	L 27–35	8–9	TSN	Commonwealth Stadium	22,492	Recap
21	18	Fri, Oct 23	9:00 p.m. CDT	at BC Lions	W 34–10	9–9	TSN	BC Place	30,833	Recap

# Games played with home uniforms.
# Games played with white uniforms.

== Post-season ==
=== Schedule ===
Game	Date	Kickoff	Opponent	Results		TV	Venue	Attendance	Summary
Game	Date	Kickoff	Opponent	Score	Record	TV	Venue	Attendance	Summary
East Semi-Final	Sat, Oct 31	12:00 p.m. CDT	at Toronto Argonauts	W 25–22	1–0	TSN/CTV/RDS	BMO Field	21,786	Recap
East Final	Sat, Nov 7	3:00 p.m. MBT	at Montreal Alouettes	L 23–33	1–1	TSN/CTV/RDS	Molson Stadium	23,035	Recap

# Games played with white uniforms.

== Team ==
=== Roster ===
Winnipeg Blue Bombers roster
**Quarterbacks**: 4 Dru Brown; 8 Zach Collaros; 9 Bryce Perkins; **Receivers**: 86 Kevens Clercius; 10 Nic Demski; 83 Tommy Nield; 17 Dorian Singer; 12 Tim White; 80 Ontaria Wilson; **Tight ends**: 87 Dante Daniels; **Running backs**: 25 Michael Chris-Ike; 20 Brady Oliveira	**Offensive linemen**: 55 Jarell Broxton; 66 Stanley Bryant; 65 Asotui Eli; 64 Tyler Elsbury; 53 Patrick Neufeld; 61 Gabe Wallace; **Defensive linemen**: 94 Jake Ceresna DT; 93 Michael Fletcher DT; 35 Thiadric Hansen DE; 5 Willie Jefferson DE; 44 Kydran Jenkins DE; 99 Cameron Lawson DT; 45 David Reese DE; 96 Tanner Schmekel DT	**Linebackers**: 52 Charles-Elliot Bouliane; 47 Tanner Cadwallader; 33 Tony Jones; 48 Lane Novak; 34 Connor Shay; 19 Kyrie Wilson; **Defensive backs**: 32 Michael Griffin II; 21 Nick Hallett; 31 Evan Holm; 16 Jake Kelly; 6 Redha Kramdi; 2 Jonathan Moxey; 1 Deatrick Nichols; 7 Ethan Stuart; 23 Trey Vaval DB/KR; 24 Major Williams; **Special teams**: 14 Sergio Castillo K; 42 Ian Leroux LS; 18 Jamieson Sheahan P	**Reserve**: 13 Taylor Elgersma QB; 68 Micah Vanterpool OL; **1-game injured**: 49 Michael Ayers LB; 27 Brody Clark LB; 81 Joey Corcoran WR; 90 De'Shaan Dixon DE; 40 Nuer Gatkuoth DE; 30 Dylan Hazen LB; 22 Matthew Peterson RB; 58 Hunter Poncius OL; 39 Jaylen Smith LB; 62 Ethan Vibert OL; 3 Jaiden Woodbey LB; **6-game injured**: 0 Cam Allen DB; 29 Ethan Ball DB; 82 Gavin Cobb WR; 56 Matt Jaworski DT; 45 Jovan Santos-Knox LB	**Practice roster**: 84 Jerand Bradley WR; 36 D. J. Harvey Jr. DB; 88 Matt Henry WR; 15 Vyshonne Janusas WR; 38 Tamon Lynum DB; 69 Nouredin Nouili OL; 41 Jordan Taylor DB; 26 Ridge Texada DB
Italics indicate American player • **Bold** indicates Global player • 45 Active, 2 Reserve, 16 Injured, 8 Practice; Roster updated 2026-11-06 • Depth chart • Transactions • More CFL rosters

=== Coaching staff ===
Winnipeg Blue Bombers staff
**Front office**: Owner – Winnipeg Football Club; Chairperson of the Board of Governors – Dayna Spiring; President/CEO – Wade Miller; General manager of Football Operations – Kyle Walters; Assistant General Manager / Director of U.S. Scouting – Danny McManus; Senior Director of Player Personnel — Jim Jauch; Senior Director of Player Personnel — Eric Deslauriers; Director of Football Operations – Matt Gulakow; **Equipment staff**: Head Equipment Manager – Brad Fotty; Assistant Equipment Manager – Kevin Todd	**Head coach**: Head coach – Mike O'Shea; **Offensive coaches**: Offensive Coordinator – Tommy Condell; Quarterbacks – Jarious Jackson; Receivers – Billy Jean; Running Backs – André Bolduc; Running Backs – Jason Hogan; Offensive Line – Marty Costello; **Defensive coaches**: Defensive Coordinator – Jordan Younger; Defensive Line – Jake Thomas; Pass Game Analyst and Linebackers – James Stanley; Defensive Assistant – Richie Hall; **Special teams coaches**: Special Teams Coordinator – Mike Miller; **Video coaches**: Video Coordinator – Evan Best; → Coaching Staff → More CFL staffs
