= Tyler Elsbury =

American gridiron football player (born 2001)

- Elsbury with the Winnipeg Blue Bombers in 2026

No. 64 – Winnipeg Blue Bombers
- Position: Offensive lineman
- Roster status: Active
- CFL status: American

Personal information
- Born: July 14, 2001 (age 25); Byron, Illinois, U.S.
- Listed height: 6 ft 6 in (1.98 m)
- Listed weight: 333 lb (151 kg)

Career information
- High school: Byron
- College: Iowa (2020–2024)
- NFL draft: 2025: undrafted

Career history
- Winnipeg Blue Bombers (2025–present)
- Stats at CFL.ca

Tyler Elsbury (born July 14, 2001) is an American professional football offensive lineman for the Winnipeg Blue Bombers of the Canadian Football League (CFL). He played college football for the Iowa Hawkeyes.

== Early life ==
Elsbury was born on July 14, 2001, in Byron, Illinois. He attended Byron High School and was a three-year football letterman as an offensive and defensive lineman. On offense, Elsbury was an all-state recipient as a senior. He also lettered in wrestling for four years and baseball for two.

== College career ==
Elsbury played college football for the Iowa Hawkeyes from 2020 to 2024. In five seasons, he played in 50 games and started in six.

== Professional career ==
Pre-draft measurables
Height	Weight	Arm length	Hand span	40-yard dash	10-yard split	20-yard split	20-yard shuttle	Three-cone drill	Vertical jump	Broad jump	Bench press
6 ft 5 in (1.96 m)	318 lb (144 kg)	9 1/2 in (0.24 m)	31 3/8 in (0.80 m)	5.21 s	1.83 s	2.94 s	4.82 s	7.88 s	30.5 in (0.77 m)	8 ft 11 in (2.72 m)	24 reps
All values from Pro day

On May 15, 2025, Elsbury signed with the Winnipeg Blue Bombers of the Canadian Football League (CFL). On June 1, he was signed to the practice roster. On July 21, Elsbury was moved to the retired list to deal with a personal matter. On December 23, he was added to active roster. Elsbury was named the starting center for the 2026 Blue Bombers season.
