= Jake Thomas (Canadian football) =

Canadian gridiron football player and coach (born 1990)

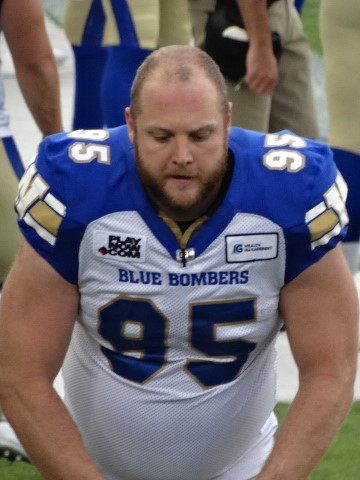
- Thomas with the Winnipeg Blue Bombers in 2022

Winnipeg Blue Bombers
- Title: Defensive line coach

Personal information
- Born: December 6, 1990 (age 35); Douglas, New Brunswick, Canada
- Listed height: 6 ft 2 in (1.88 m)
- Listed weight: 275 lb (125 kg)

Career information
- Position: Defensive tackle (No. 95)
- University: Acadia
- CFL draft: 2012: 4th round, 29th overall pick

Career history

Playing
- Winnipeg Blue Bombers (2012–2025)

Coaching
- Winnipeg Blue Bombers (2026–present) Defensive line coach

Awards and highlights
- 2× Grey Cup champion (2019, 2021)
- Stats at CFL.ca

Jake Thomas
Medal record

Men's American football

Representing Canada

World Championship
Silver medal – second place	2011 Austria	Team competition

Jake Thomas (born December 6, 1990) is a Canadian former professional football defensive tackle and is the defensive line coach for the Winnipeg Blue Bombers of the Canadian Football League (CFL).

== University career ==
Thomas played CIS football for the Acadia Axemen.

== Professional career ==
Thomas was drafted 29th overall in the fourth round of the 2012 CFL draft by the Winnipeg Blue Bombers and signed with the team on May 11, 2012. He played in his first game on June 29, 2012 against the BC Lions where he also recorded his first defensive tackle. He played in 14 regular season games in a backup role as a rookie. In 2013, Thomas continued to develop in a backup role and recorded his first career quarterback sack against the Hamilton Tiger-Cats on November 2, 2013 after tackling Dan LeFevour for a two-yard loss. While his primary role is playing on the defensive line, the Blue Bombers have also used Thomas on the offensive line, either due to injuries or in short yardage situations. He recorded his first career interception against the BC Lions on July 21, 2017 when he picked off Travis Lulay and lateralled the ball to teammate Kyle Knox who then returned it for a touchdown.

Thomas was the longest serving member of the Blue Bombers team that beat both the Calgary Stampeders and Saskatchewan Roughriders during the 2019 CFL Playoffs, en route to the 107th Grey Cup game. As the longest serving player at the time, Thomas was the first member of the Blue Bomber team to raise the Grey Cup on stage during the team's celebration. He signed a one-year contract extension with the team on January 4, 2021. After another strong season in 2021, and another Grey Cup victory, Thomas re-signed with the Blue Bombers on January 5, 2022, returning for his tenth season in Winnipeg. On December 12, 2022, Thomas and the Bombers agreed to another contract extension.

== Coaching career ==
On December 22, 2025, the Winnipeg Blue Bombers announced that Thomas would be the defensive line coach for the 2026 season. This hire effectively ended his playing career.
