= Jason Hogan =

Canadian gridiron football coach (born 1986)

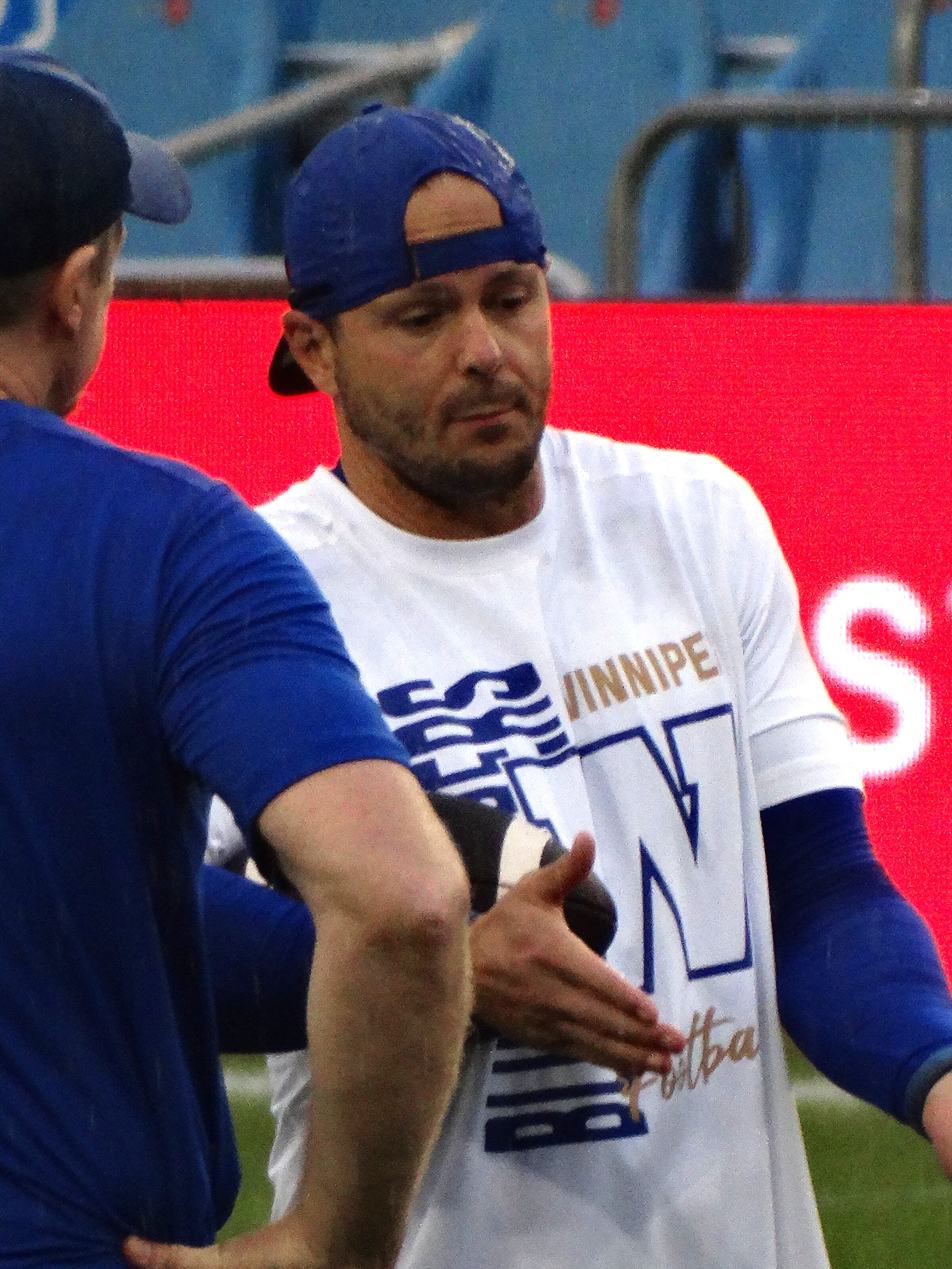
- Hogan with the Winnipeg Blue Bombers in 2025

Winnipeg Blue Bombers
- Title: Running backs coach

Personal information
- Born: May 1, 1986 (age 40); Rosemère, Quebec, Canada
- Listed height: 6 ft 0 in (1.83 m)

Career information
- Position: Quarterback
- University: Laval
- CFL draft: 2010: undrafted

Career history
- 2009–2010: André-Grasset Phénix (Quarterbacks coach)
- 2011–2014: André-Grasset Phénix (Offensive coordinator)
- 2016: Montreal Alouettes (Offensive quality control coach)
- 2017: Montreal Alouettes (Receivers coach)
- 2018: Montreal Carabins (Quarterbacks coach)
- 2019–2021: Montreal Carabins (Running backs coach, Receivers coach)
- 2021: Montreal Carabins (Assistant offensive coordinator)
- 2022–2024: Winnipeg Blue Bombers (Running backs coach)
- 2025: Winnipeg Blue Bombers (Offensive coordinator)
- 2026–present: Winnipeg Blue Bombers (Running backs coach)

Awards and highlights
- Vanier Cup champion (2006)

Jason Hogan (born May 1, 1986) is a Canadian professional football coach who is the running backs coach for the Winnipeg Blue Bombers of the Canadian Football League (CFL).

== University career ==
Hogan played CIS football for the Laval Rouge et Or where he played at quarterback. He won a Vanier Cup championship with the team in 2006.

== Coaching career ==
=== Collège André-Grasset Phénix ===
Hogan began his coaching career in CEGEP with the Collège André-Grasset Phénix football program as the team's quarterbacks coach. He then served as the team's offensive coordinator from 2011 to 2014. In his six years with the Phénix, he was part of three championship teams.

=== Montreal Alouettes ===
As a front-office employee and account executive, Hogan sold gameday tickets to fans. Later, he joined the Montreal Alouettes coaching staff as the offensive quality control coach on December 23, 2015. After spending the 2016 season in that role, he was promoted to receivers coach for 2017.

=== Montreal Carabins ===
On July 23, 2018, it was announced that Hogan had joined the coaching staff of the Montreal Carabins as the team's quarterbacks coach. We was later named the running backs coach and receivers coach. After a couple of seasons with the program, he was named assistant offensive coordinator. He resigned in March 2022 for an opportunity in the Canadian Football League.

=== Winnipeg Blue Bombers ===
On March 25, 2022, it was announced that Hogan had joined the Winnipeg Blue Bombers as the team's running backs coach. He served in that capacity for three seasons where the team's starter, Brady Oliveira, was named to the All-CFL team in 2023 and 2024 and also won the CFL's Most Outstanding Canadian Award in both of those years while being named the CFL's Most Outstanding Player in 2024. He was promoted to offensive coordinator on February 4, 2025. After one season in that capacity, he returned as the team's running backs coach for 2026.

== Personal life ==
Hogan and his wife, Ivana, have a son and a daughter.
