= Winnipeg Blue Bombers =

Canadian football team

- Current season
- Logo
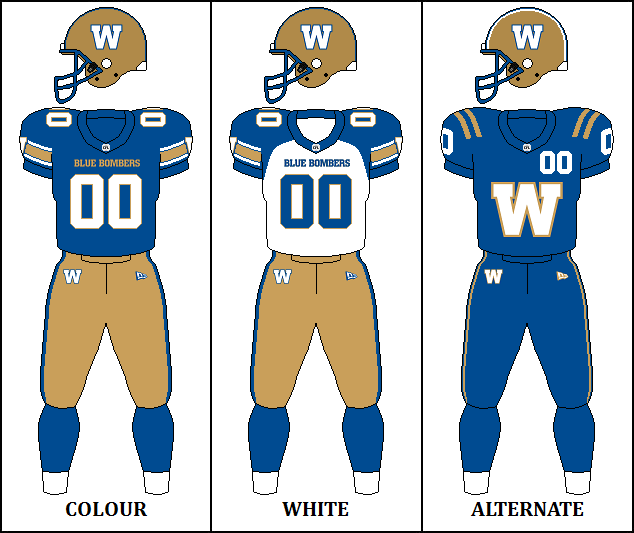
- Uniforms

General information
- Founded: 1930
- Stadium: Princess Auto Stadium
- Headquartered: Winnipeg, Manitoba, Canada
- Colours: Royal blue, metallic gold, white
- Fight song: "Bombers Victory March"
- Mascot: Buzz and Boomer
- Website: bluebombers.com

Personnel
- Owner: Winnipeg Football Club
- General manager: Kyle Walters
- Head coach: Vacant
- President: Wade Miller

Nicknames
- Bombers, Blue and Gold, Big Blue, True Blue

Home fields
- River Park & Wesley Park (1930–1935); Osborne Stadium (1935–1952); Winnipeg Stadium (1953–2012); Princess Auto Stadium (2013–present)

League / conference affiliations
- Canadian Football League: West Division

Championships
- Grey Cup wins: 12 (1935, 1939, 1941, 1958, 1959, 1961, 1962, 1984, 1988, 1990, 2019, 2021)

The Winnipeg Blue Bombers are a professional Canadian football team based in Winnipeg. The Blue Bombers compete in the Canadian Football League (CFL) as a member club of the league's West division. They play their home games at Princess Auto Stadium.

The Blue Bombers were founded in 1930 as the Winnipeg Rugby Football Club, later changed to the Winnipeg Football Club, which is the organization's legal name. (Note: In 1930 the original legal name was Winnipeg Rugby Football Club.) The Blue Bombers are one of two community-owned teams in the CFL and are also the only major professional sports franchise in North America still in existence without shareholders. (Note: This is in contrast to the Green Bay Packers and Saskatchewan Roughriders, both which do have shareholders despite being community-owned non-profit organizations.)

Since their establishment, the Blue Bombers have won the Grey Cup championship 12 times, most recently in 2021 CFL season when they defeated the Hamilton Tiger-Cats 33–25 in the 108th Grey Cup. The team holds the record for most Grey Cup appearances of any team (29) and Winnipeg were the first club in Western Canada to win a championship.

== History ==
=== Beginnings ===
The first football team in Winnipeg was formed in 1879, named the Winnipeg Rugby Football Club. On June 10, 1930, the Winnipeg Tammany Tigers, who were in financial difficulty, disbanded and merged with some of the other teams in the city to create the new Winnipeg Rugby Football Club, known unofficially and simply as the Winnipegs or even the shorter Pegs, (Note: The team was literally known by this one word name. This was common practice among sportswriters of the era, to refer to a team, even one with a nickname, by its city; for a demonstration, see George Will's Men at Work, for historical references to the Bostons (Red Sox) or the New Yorks (Yankees).) adopting the colours green and white. The Winnipegs played their first game against St.John's Rugby Football Club on June 13, 1930 at Carruthers Park in the North End of the city, losing 7–3.

In 1932, the Winnipegs and St. John's joined and adopted blue and gold as their colours. In 1933 they also absorbed the Garrison Rugby Club football team. The Winnipegs played in the Manitoba Rugby Football Union from 1930 to 1935. Prior to the move to Osborne Stadium in 1935, the team played at Carruthers Park, River Park, and Wesley Park.

=== First Grey Cup Victory ===
By 1935 Western teams had been to the Grey Cup game 10 times, but they had always gone home empty-handed. The East was much more powerful, outscoring their opponents 236–29 through those ten games. On December 7, 1935, the Winnipegs got their first trip, to the 23rd Grey Cup. The game was being held in Hamilton, with the home-town Tigers their opponents. It was a rainy day at Hamilton Amateur Athletic Association Grounds, with 6,405 fans in attendance.

Winnipeg was up 5–0 before many fans had even reached their seats. Hamilton player Jack Craig let the opening kickoff bounce to the turf, and a Winnipeg player promptly recovered the ball at the Hamilton 15-yard line. Winnipeg scored quickly on a Bob Fritz pass to Bud Marquardt to get the early lead. After scoring another touchdown on a Greg Kabat catch in the endzone, Winnipeg went into halftime up 12–4. Their lead was soon cut to three points in the second half after Hamilton scored a touchdown of their own, helped by a blocked kick that placed the ball on the Winnipeg 15-yard line.

Then, after a Hamilton rouge, Winnipeg's Fritz Hanson caught a punt, and after a few moves and a few missed tackles, was on his way to a 78-yard touchdown return, making the score 18–10. Hamilton forced a safety to bring themselves within six points, but failed to cross the goal-line, getting as far as the Winnipeg four-yard line. The final score was Winnipeg 18, Hamilton 12.

With that, Winnipeg had become the first team from Western Canada to win the Grey Cup.

=== Early days of glory ===
After the Grey Cup victory in 1935, The Winnipeg Tribune sports writer Vince Leah called the team the "Blue Bombers of Western football". Until then, the team had no official nickname, but they quickly began using "Winnipeg Blue Bombers". Journalist Jim Coleman wrote that the name came at a time when boxer Joe Louis had international success with his similar nickname, the Brown Bomber.

In 1935, the Blue Bombers, Calgary Bronks, and Regina Roughriders formed the Western Interprovincial Football Union at the highest level of play in Western Canada. Between 1936 and 1949, the Bombers won the right to compete for the Grey Cup in 1937, 1938, 1939, 1941, 1942, 1943, and 1945. Of these appearances, Winnipeg won only twice: in 1939 over the Ottawa Rough Riders, and again in their 1941 rematch.

Jack Jacobs, known as Indian Jack, was a Creek quarterback from Oklahoma. He came to the Bombers in 1950 after a successful career in the United States. He led the Bombers to two Grey Cup appearances, losing both. His exciting style of play and extreme talent increased ticket sales and overall awareness and popularity of the club. The revenue the Bombers were getting from their newfound popularity was enough to convince them to move from the small, outdated Osborne Stadium to the new Winnipeg Stadium (later known as Canad Inns Stadium). Jacobs was so well-liked that fans even referred to the new stadium as "The House that Jack Built". Jacobs retired in 1954 to become a talent scout for the team.

In 1951, Jack Jacobs became the first professional football quarterback to throw for over 3,000 yards in a season, with 3,248. That year, he was also the first professional football quarterback to throw for at least 30 touchdowns, with 33. The next year he bested that mark with 34.

=== Bud Grant era ===
Bud Grant joined the team in 1953 after a two-year stint with the Philadelphia Eagles, as one of numerous NFL players lured to Canada during the first part of the decade for then-better salaries. After a four-year career as a receiver (classified only as "offensive end" at the time), he accepted the position of head coach of the Bombers in 1957. Grant went on to coach the team for the next 10 years before becoming the head coach of the NFL's Minnesota Vikings.

In 1956, Blue Bombers fans named Labatt's Pilsener Lager, which had a blue label, Labatt Blue, in honour of their team. In 1958, the Blue Bombers joined the newly formed Canadian Football League, and have competed there since.

During Grant's tenure as head coach, the Bombers welcomed the likes of Ken Ploen, Leo Lewis, Farrell Funston, Ernie Pitts, Charlie Shepard, and Ed Kotowich to the team. The Bombers competed in six Grey Cup games during Grant's tenure, winning four (1958, 1959, 1961, and 1962). In 1961, the Bombers won 21–14 over the Hamilton Tiger-Cats in the first Grey Cup game to go into overtime. The Bombers and Ticats met again in the 1962 Grey Cup, with the game being postponed with 9:29 left in the fourth quarter due to zero visibility in the famous "Fog Bowl". The game resumed the next morning, with the Bombers winning 28–27.

During the second half of the 1960s, the Bombers' domination gave way to lean years, with four seasons of double digits in the loss column. The team bounced back in the early 1970s with the likes of quarterback Don Jonas, running-back Mack Herron, and wide receivers Jim Thorpe and Bob LaRose. The team finished first in the Western Conference in 1972, the first time it had done so since 1962. However, the Bombers came up short in the Western final against the Saskatchewan Roughriders, squandering a 13-point third-quarter lead en route to a heartbreaking 27–24 loss, with Saskatchewan kicker Jack Abendschan scoring on a short field goal attempt on the last play of the game to send the 'Riders to the 1972 Grey Cup against Hamilton. The 1972 season was also the last time the team finished first in the West until the 2021 season. The team struggled for a few more seasons under coaches Jim Spavital and Bud Riley before Ray Jauch was brought in as head coach before the 1978 season. Under Jauch, the Bombers became one of the stronger teams in the West, but usually behind Jauch's former team, the powerhouse Edmonton Eskimos coached by Hugh Campbell.

In 1981, wide receiver Eugene Goodlow became the first CFL player to reach the century mark in receptions in a season. Goodlow caught 100 passes for 1,494 yards and 14 touchdowns. That season, the Bombers became one of the first teams to have three receivers with at least 1,000 yards in a season: Goodlow with 1,494, Joe Poplawski with 1,271, and Rick House with 1,102.

=== Cal Murphy era ===
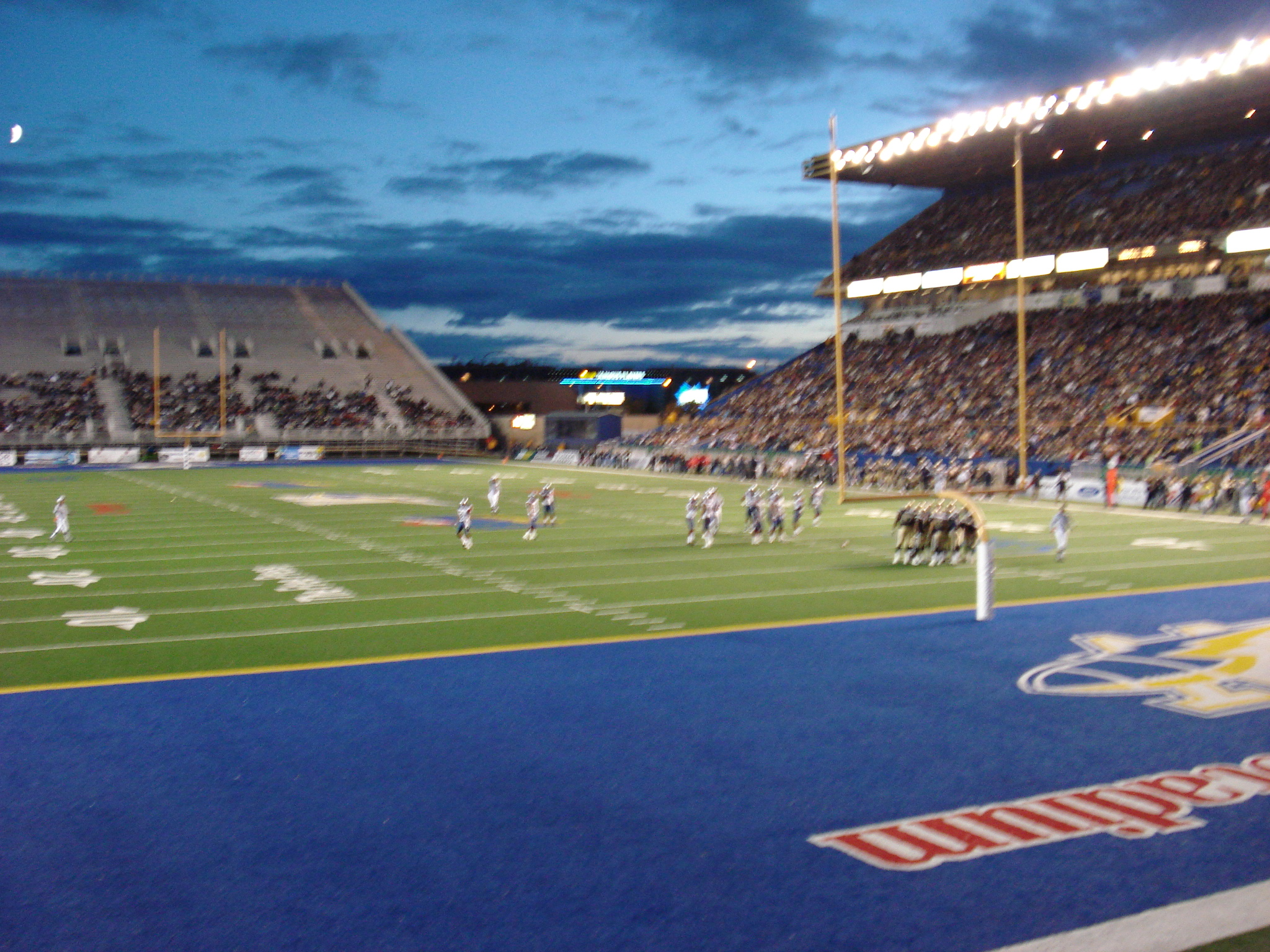
The now demolished Canad Inns Stadium, with end zone stands added for the 94th Grey Cup game.

In 1983, Cal Murphy was hired to be the new head coach of the Blue Bombers. Almost immediately, Murphy set the tone for his career with the Bombers by trading popular QB Dieter Brock at midseason (because of Brock's desire to play in the USFL) to Hamilton in exchange for QB Tom Clements. Trading Brock turned out to be a wise decision; Clements led the Bombers to a crushing victory in the 1984 Grey Cup, coincidentally over the Brock-led Tiger-Cats. This was Winnipeg's first Grey Cup in 22 years, and also their last win and appearance in the championship game as the Western representative until their victory in the 107th Grey Cup. Murphy was named coach of the year in both 1983 and 1984.

In 1987, Murphy stepped down as head coach to become general manager, and assistant coach Mike Riley (son of former Winnipeg coach Bud Riley) took over head-coaching duties. Then, just prior to the start of the 1987 season, the Montreal Alouettes folded. With the East Division suddenly down to three teams compared to five in the West, the league moved the Blue Bombers (who had been the easternmost team in the West) into the East Division, to balance the league.

Under Riley, the Blue Bombers quickly made an impact in the East, winning Grey Cups over their former division rivals B.C. and Edmonton in 1988 and 1990 respectively, and garnering Riley the coach of the year award in both championship seasons. After Riley left, Darryl Rogers and Urban Bowman each led the team for a season until 1993, when Cal Murphy took over head-coaching duties again. Murphy went on to lead the team to a total of five Grey Cup appearances, winning as a coach in 1984, and as GM in 1988 and 1990. He left the club after the 1996 season, having spent 14 years with the team. Later, he coached the Saskatchewan Roughriders in 1999.

Winnipeg played a total of eight consecutive seasons in the East before moving to the newly created North Division in 1995 during the CFL's expansion to the United States. When the CFL's American experiment ended a year later, and the Alouettes were re-established, the Blue Bombers returned to the re-constituted West Division. This arrangement also lasted only one season, as Winnipeg returned to the East again for the 1997 season after the Ottawa Rough Riders ceased operations.

=== Milt Stegall era ===
In November 1996, Cal Murphy left the Blue Bombers' organization after 14 years. This was partly due to a 68–7 playoff thumping by the Edmonton Eskimos, and partly because the team had not had a winning record the previous two years, winning only seven games in 1995, and nine in 1996.

Jeff Reinebold was hired to replace Murphy as the team coach, and despite a huge amount of hype, and championship promises going into the 1997 season, he proved to be one of the least successful head coaches in team history. The Bombers won four games in 1997, and just three in 1998.

The few notable highlights from that era include:

- Milt Stegall became an all-star in 1997, his first full year with the team, and scored what seemed like at least one long touchdown in every game.
- A 43–12 drubbing of the eventual Western Division champion Saskatchewan Roughriders in the 1997 Labour Day Classic
- In a dramatic win over the Roughriders at home in 1998, forgotten backup QB Troy Kopp led the second-half over-20-point comeback. This was the "Guaranteed Win day" that the club had been promoting all week, as well as the first win of the season, in week 11.

The few memorable players on the team during that time included linebacker K.D. Williams, safety Tom Europe, running back/returner Eric Blount, and Milt Stegall.

Milt Stegall joined the Bombers in 1995 after a three-year career returning kicks and seeing spot duty at receiver with the Cincinnati Bengals. He played in the Bombers' final six games of the 1995 season, racking up 469 receiving yards. In 1997, Stegall set a new league record that still stands today for average gain per reception with 26.5 yards on 61 catches for 1616 yards, including 14 touchdowns. Following a brief return to the NFL, that saw him on the verge of making the New Orleans Saints if not for a serious knee injury at the end of training camp, Stegall remained the team's primary receiver.

In 1999, the Bombers acquired Khari Jones from the BC Lions. Together, Stegall and Jones brought the Bombers back to prominence, with Jones being the CFL's most outstanding player in 2001, and Stegall getting the honour in 2002. During the 2006 Grey Cup, Khari Jones and Milt Stegall were voted and honoured as the best QB/WR combo in CFL history. Charles Roberts joined them in 2001, a year which the Bombers went to the Grey Cup, which they eventually lost to the Calgary Stampeders. The following season, Winnipeg returned to the West Division following the establishment of the Ottawa Renegades. The team was a powerhouse during this period, being one of the best teams in the league from 2001 until 2003.

Midway through the 2004 season, Jones was traded to the Calgary Stampeders, with backup QB Kevin Glenn taking over the starting duties. Glenn led the team to two mediocre seasons after the trade. Prior to the 2006 season, the Renegades suspended operations and Winnipeg once again returned to the East Division.

With the offensive core of Stegall and Roberts still intact, Glenn led the Bombers back to respectability in 2006. The season included many highlights, but none as exciting at what is simply known as "The Play". On July 20, 2006, trailing the Edmonton Eskimos on the road 22–19, and facing third and long on their own 10-yard line with 4 seconds left in the game, Milt Stegall caught a 100-yard TD pass from Kevin Glenn as time expired to win the game 25–22. It is considered by many as the greatest play in CFL history. Aided by the "miracle" catch, the Bombers ended up making their first playoff appearance in two years. Despite losing in the first round, optimism going into the 2007 was higher than ever.

The 2007 CFL season was in some ways the year of Milt Stegall: he broke the career CFL touchdown record and fell just short of overtaking the career receiving yards record held by Allen Pitts. The 2007 season was rumoured to be Stegall's last, as he was 37 years old and had been contemplating retirement for the previous two seasons.

The 2007 Grey Cup game was played between the Winnipeg Blue Bombers and the Saskatchewan Roughriders, the first time the two teams met for the championship. Winnipeg was defeated by the Saskatchewan Roughriders 23–19 in the Rogers Centre in Toronto. During the East division final win over the Toronto Argonauts, quarterback Kevin Glenn broke his arm and Winnipeg was left with an inexperienced rookie to take his place for the championship game. Back-up quarterback Ryan Dinwiddie — in his first CFL start — did not fare well and threw one touchdown pass, fumbled once and threw three interceptions to Saskatchewan cornerback James Johnson. Johnson was later declared the game MVP.

One of the picks was shown in the instant replay to have hit the ground before it was caught. Despite his rookie mistakes, Dinwiddie showed promise going into the 2008 season. He was released prior to the 2009 season.

It was announced on January 31, 2008, that Milt Stegall would return for one more year for the 2008 season. He signed a one-year contract for $200,000 on the basis of the fact his wife wanted to have their next child in Winnipeg, and the fact that they were in line to be a contender for the Grey Cup. He took a $50,000 pay cut, and started the season 159 yards away from breaking Allen Pitts' all-time receiving yards record.

Other returning players who were free agents going into the 2008 season, including star DE Tom Canada, OL's Dan Goodspeed, and Matt Sheridan, signed for less money from the Bombers than other teams were prepared to pay them, in hopes of a Grey Cup run in '08. Tom Canada, in particular, reportedly turned down a much higher contract offer from the Montreal Alouettes, to come back to Winnipeg.

The Bombers made a surprise trade when they sent all-star running back Charles Roberts to B.C. for Joe Smith on September 2, 2008. Then on September 8, 2008, they traded all-star DE Tom Canada to Hamilton for Zeke Moreno. But on September 9, 2008, the trade was cancelled because Canada was injured and could not play for at least 10 weeks. So, since they could not trade Canada, they sent over Corey Mace and a first-round pick for Moreno.

Following the 2008 season in which the Bombers were defeated in the division semifinals, Doug Berry (the head coach) was fired. Mike Kelly was chosen to replace him. At the end of the Cal Murphy era, Mike Kelly was the offensive coordinator and was passed over for the top job in favour of Jeff Reinebold. With Milt Stegall's early-season knee surgery and drop in production, it was once again speculated that Milt Stegall would retire.

The departure of Brendan Taman on January 13, 2009, was another sign that this era was coming to an end and a new one was beginning. On February 18, 2009, Milt Stegall did retire from the CFL which formally ended the Milt Stegall era.

=== The Revolving Door era ===
The return of Mike Kelly opened a new Cal Murphy era, and the board hoped to bring back Murphy's success. However, Kelly was fired by the Winnipeg Blue Bombers Board of Directors on December 17, 2009, after one year of employment.

Paul LaPolice was introduced as the 28th head coach in Blue Bombers history on February 5, 2010. The new coach emphasized the idea of "team" and playing for the uniform. He also made it a point to talk about fixing problems rather than making excuses. The new paradigm was tested in the 2010 season in which the team finished 4–14 and missed the playoffs for the second straight year. Nine of those games were lost by four points or fewer, while 10 were lost by a touchdown or less.

The 2011 season featured an almost completely unchanged team (save for a few losses to the NFL and a few gains from the draft). The Blue Bombers reversed their standings from last place in the east in 2010 to finishing in first place in the East division with a 10–8 record. The team success hinged on a league-leading defence dubbed Swaggerville, which led them to their first division title in 10 years. The team advanced to the 99th Grey Cup after defeating Hamilton in the Eastern Final. However, they lost to the favoured BC Lions by a score of 34–23.

On August 9, 2013, the Winnipeg Blue Bombers announced that CEO Garth Buchko stepped down and General Manager Joe Mack was fired.

The CFL returned to Ottawa in 2014 with the establishment of the Redblacks. Initially, the league planned to keep Winnipeg in the East, at least for the short term, due in part to the ongoing competitive dominance of the West. Despite this, Blue Bombers management lobbied heavily to return to the West Division immediately (for historical reasons), and eventually the league relented. The Blue Bombers finished last place in their first season back in the West, with a 7–11 record.

=== O'Shea and the end of the drought ===
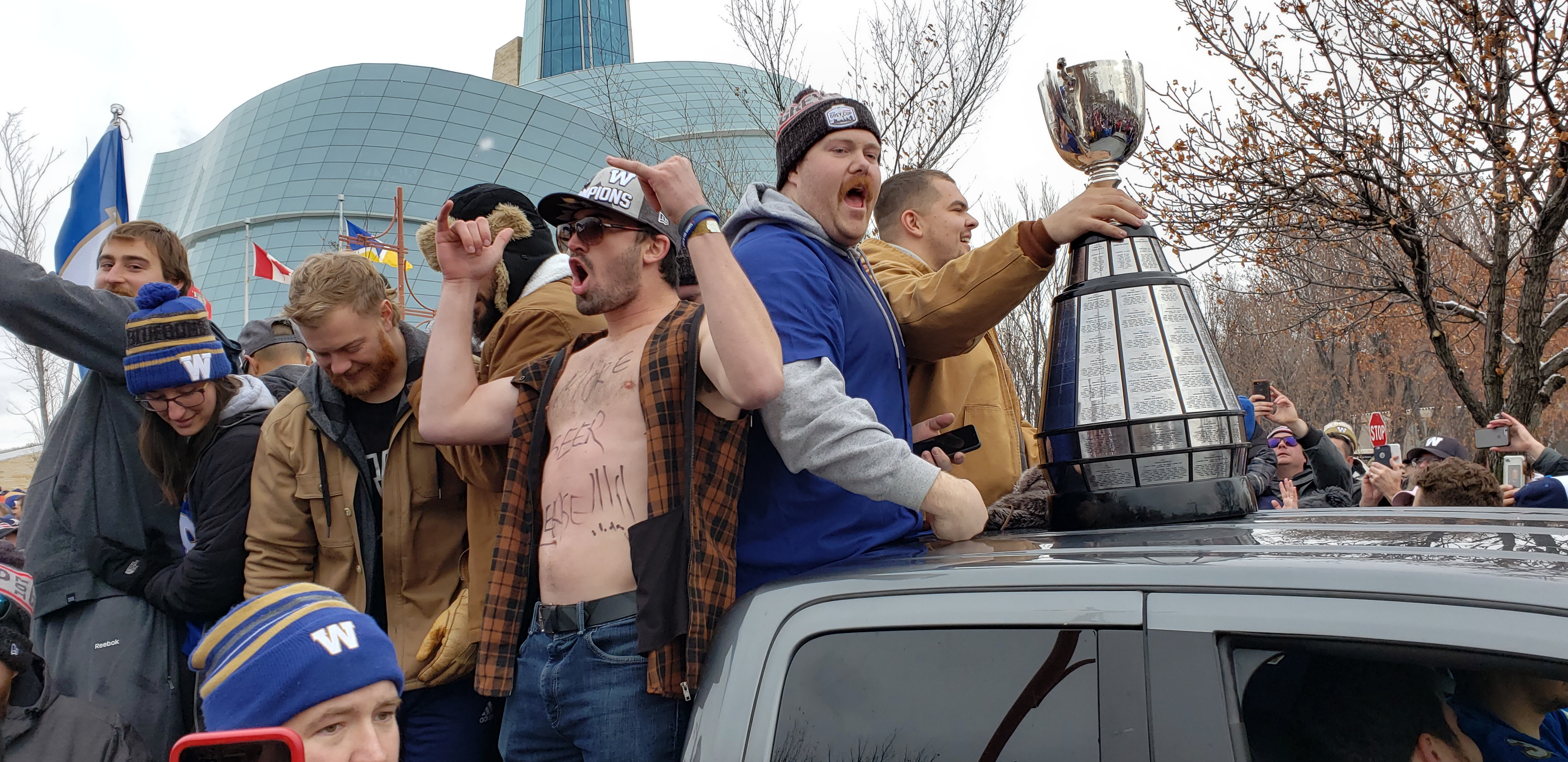
Members of the Blue Bombers with the Grey Cup during their championship parade in 2019.

After being named the acting CEO in August 2013 Wade Miller was announced as the CEO and president of the club on November 12, 2013. The shake-up of the top brass in 2013 also led to Kyle Walters having to take over the acting GM duties, which were made officially his on November 26, when he was named the general manager.

Mike O'Shea was hired by the Winnipeg Blue Bombers on December 4, 2013, to become the team's 30th head coach. O'Shea helped the team return to the playoffs when he made the switch to Matt Nichols as the starting quarterback. The team still failed to advance to a Grey Cup despite the rise in success. During the 2019 season, an injury to Matt Nichols and a suspension to Andrew Harris seemed to end their season. The Bombers traded for Zach Collaros right before the trade deadline, who joined his third team for the year. Collaros formed a quarterback pairing with Chris Streveler. The two quarterbacks' play, behind the dominant performance of the defence saw the team win their 11th championship at the 107th Grey Cup, breaking a 28-year drought. Hometown player Harris became the first player ever to win the Grey Cup MVP and Grey Cup Most Valuable Canadian.

After the CFL cancelled its 2020 season, the league returned in 2021, and the Bombers finished atop the West with an 11–3 record, claiming their first first-place West Division finish since 1972. The team outlasted their arch-rival Saskatchewan Roughriders in the West Final 21–17, setting up a rematch of the 2019 Grey Cup game against the Hamilton Tiger-Cats. The Bombers won the 2021 Grey Cup in overtime 33–25, the first back-to-back Grey Cup champions since the Montreal Alouettes won the 97th and 98th Grey Cup, and the first West Division team to win them since the Edmonton Eskimos' 1978–1982 run of five straight. In 2022, the team finished atop the West again with a 15–3 record, reaching the Grey Cup Final for the third straight season, but the team's hopes of a three-peat were dashed on a last-minute blocked field goal at the hands of the Toronto Argonauts, 24–23. They reached the Grey Cup yet again in 2023, winning the West Division with a 14–4 record, but this time, they were upset by the Alouettes courtesy of a touchdown with 13 seconds left in the game to make it 28–24. In 2024, the Bombers completed their run of 5 consecutive West Division titles before losing in the 111th Grey Cup to the Toronto Argonauts.

== Community ownership ==
The Winnipeg Blue Bombers are operated by the Winnipeg Football Club (WFC). WFC is a not-for-profit community organization incorporated as a Manitoba corporation on March 5, 1951. The object of this organization is the promotion and fostering of football in Manitoba.

WFC controls Triple B Stadium Inc., a non-share corporation whose object is to develop, construct, and operate a stadium at the University of Manitoba, Princess Auto Stadium. The stadium is used by WFC, the University of Manitoba Bisons, amateur athletics, and other public purposes.

WFC also controlled Valour FC Inc., whose object was to operate a professional soccer club in Winnipeg, and participated in the Canadian Premier League (CPL). The soccer operations were suspended following the 2025 CPL season.

== Current personnel ==
=== Football operation staff ===
Winnipeg Blue Bombers staff
| **Front office**: Owner – Winnipeg Football Club; Chairperson of the Board of Governors – Dayna Spiring; President/CEO – Wade Miller; General manager of Football Operations – Kyle Walters; Assistant General Manager / Director of U.S. Scouting – Danny McManus; Senior Director of Player Personnel — Jim Jauch; Senior Director of Player Personnel — Eric Deslauriers; Director of Football Operations – Matt Gulakow; **Equipment staff**: Head Equipment Manager – Brad Fotty; Assistant Equipment Manager – Kevin Todd | **Head coach**: Head coach – Mike O'Shea; **Offensive coaches**: Offensive Coordinator – Tommy Condell; Quarterbacks – Jarious Jackson; Receivers – Billy Jean; Running Backs – André Bolduc; Running Backs – Jason Hogan; Offensive Line – Marty Costello; **Defensive coaches**: Defensive Coordinator – Jordan Younger; Defensive Line – Jake Thomas; Pass Game Analyst and Linebackers – James Stanley; Defensive Assistant – Richie Hall; **Special teams coaches**: Special Teams Coordinator – Mike Miller; **Video coaches**: Video Coordinator – Evan Best; → Coaching Staff → More CFL staffs |

=== Roster ===
Winnipeg Blue Bombers roster
| **Quarterbacks**: 4 Dru Brown; 8 Zach Collaros; 9 Bryce Perkins; **Receivers**: 86 Kevens Clercius; 10 Nic Demski; 83 Tommy Nield; 17 Dorian Singer; 12 Tim White; 80 Ontaria Wilson; **Tight ends**: 87 Dante Daniels; **Running backs**: 25 Michael Chris-Ike; 20 Brady Oliveira | **Offensive linemen**: 55 Jarell Broxton; 66 Stanley Bryant; 65 Asotui Eli; 64 Tyler Elsbury; 53 Patrick Neufeld; 61 Gabe Wallace; **Defensive linemen**: 94 Jake Ceresna DT; 93 Michael Fletcher DT; 35 Thiadric Hansen DE; 5 Willie Jefferson DE; 44 Kydran Jenkins DE; 99 Cameron Lawson DT; 45 David Reese DE; 96 Tanner Schmekel DT | **Linebackers**: 52 Charles-Elliot Bouliane; 47 Tanner Cadwallader; 33 Tony Jones; 48 Lane Novak; 34 Connor Shay; 19 Kyrie Wilson; **Defensive backs**: 32 Michael Griffin II; 21 Nick Hallett; 31 Evan Holm; 16 Jake Kelly; 6 Redha Kramdi; 2 Jonathan Moxey; 1 Deatrick Nichols; 7 Ethan Stuart; 23 Trey Vaval DB/KR; 24 Major Williams; **Special teams**: 14 Sergio Castillo K; 42 Ian Leroux LS; 18 Jamieson Sheahan P | **Reserve**: 13 Taylor Elgersma QB; 68 Micah Vanterpool OL; **1-game injured**: 49 Michael Ayers LB; 27 Brody Clark LB; 81 Joey Corcoran WR; 90 De'Shaan Dixon DE; 40 Nuer Gatkuoth DE; 30 Dylan Hazen LB; 22 Matthew Peterson RB; 58 Hunter Poncius OL; 39 Jaylen Smith LB; 62 Ethan Vibert OL; 3 Jaiden Woodbey LB; **6-game injured**: 0 Cam Allen DB; 29 Ethan Ball DB; 82 Gavin Cobb WR; 56 Matt Jaworski DT; 45 Jovan Santos-Knox LB | **Practice roster**: 84 Jerand Bradley WR; 36 D. J. Harvey Jr. DB; 88 Matt Henry WR; 15 Vyshonne Janusas WR; 38 Tamon Lynum DB; 69 Nouredin Nouili OL; 41 Jordan Taylor DB; 26 Ridge Texada DB |
Italics indicate American player • **Bold** indicates Global player • 45 Active, 2 Reserve, 16 Injured, 8 Practice; Roster updated 2026-11-06 • Depth chart • Transactions • More CFL rosters

== Management ==
=== Head coaches ===
- Jack Millidge (1930)
- Pete Barnes (1931)
- Carl Cronin (1932–1933)
- Greg Kabat (1934)
- Bob Fritz (1935–1937)
- Reg Threlfall (1938–1944)
- Bert Warwick (1945)
- Jack West (1946–1948)
- Frank Larson (1949–1950)
- George Trafton (1951–1953)
- Allie Sherman (1954–1956)
- Bud Grant (1957–1966)
- Joe Zaleski (1967–1969)
- Jim Spavital (1970–1973)
- Bud Riley (1974–1977)
- Ray Jauch (1978–1982)
- Cal Murphy (1983–1986, 1993–1996)
- Mike Riley (1987–1990)
- Darryl Rogers (1991)
- Urban Bowman (1992)
- Jeff Reinebold (1997–1998)
- Dave Ritchie (1999–2004)
- Jim Daley (2004–2005)
- Doug Berry (2006–2008)
- Mike Kelly (2009)
- Paul LaPolice (2010–2012)
- Tim Burke (2012–2013)
- Mike O'Shea (2014–2026)

=== General managers ===
- Joe Ryan (1931–1941)
- Lou Adelman (1945)
- Gord Bieber (1946–1947)
- Bill Boivin (1955–1957)
- Jim Ausley (1958–1964)
- Bud Grant (1965–1966)
- Joe Zaleski (1967)
- Earl Lunsford (1968–1982)
- Paul Robson (1983–1986)
- Cal Murphy (1987–1996)
- Jeff Reinebold (1997–1998)
- Ken Bishop (1999)
- Lyle Bauer (2000–2001)
- Dave Ritchie (2002–2003)
- Brendan Taman (2004–2008)
- Mike Kelly (2009)
- Joe Mack (2010–2013)
- Kyle Walters (2013–present)

== Stadium ==
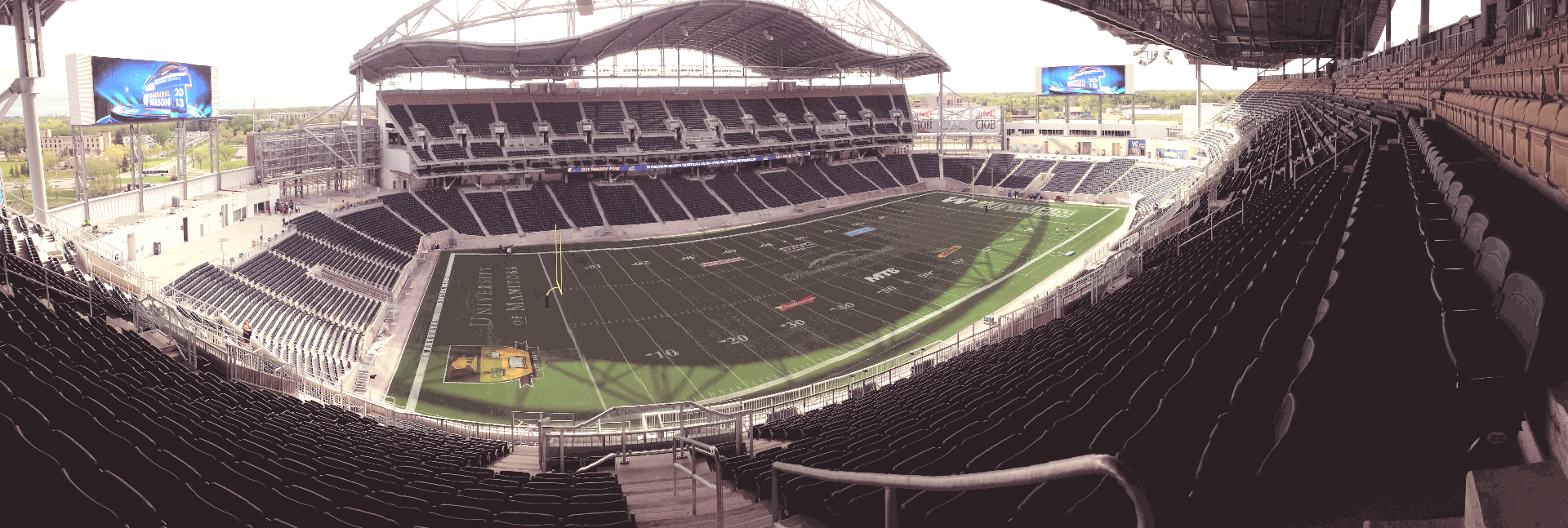
Panoramic view of Princess Auto Stadium in 2013

During the Blue Bombers' early years, the team played at Osborne Stadium, a small stadium near the Manitoba Legislative Buildings. The fast, passing-dominated play of Bombers quarterback Jack Jacobs dramatically increased attendance at games and precipitated the need for a new, larger stadium. Winnipeg Stadium was built in the West End of the city near Polo Park, and the Blue Bombers began play there in 1953. The stadium experienced significant changes throughout its existence, including a renaming to Canad Inns Stadium in 2001.

Over the years, various plans were proposed to relocate the stadium. In 2008, a plan was proposed to build a new stadium at the University of Manitoba, with both private and public funding. On April 2, 2009, David Asper (a media mogul located out of Winnipeg associated with Canwest and Creswin Properties) struck a deal with all levels of governments to build a new 33,422-seat (expandable to 45,000) stadium at the University of Manitoba in southwest Winnipeg. This would serve as the home for the Blue Bombers, as well as the U of M Bisons. The deal included refurbishing the existing Bison Stadium for practice and training, as well as upgrading, expanding, and building new sports and fitness facilities. This project, once completed, would be the premiere sports training facility in Canada. The project would have received ongoing funding from a retail development that Asper planned to build on the former Canad Inns stadium site. As part of the deal, Creswin properties would take over ownership of the team in 2010. The new stadium and facilities would have been completed for the 2012 CFL season, with the retail development finished in 2013. On December 13, 2013, it was reported that Asper and Creswin Properties would no longer be included in the stadium project, which would continue with funding from the City of Winnipeg, Province of Manitoba, and Winnipeg Blue Bombers.

On May 2, 2012, the Blue Bombers announced that because of construction delays, the stadium would not be ready until September, thus forcing the team to play four or five home games at Canad Inns Stadium to start the season. In June 2012, it was announced that the stadium would not open until the 2013 season.

The Blue Bombers played their first home game at Princess Auto Stadium (then known as Investor's Group Field) on June 27, 2013, losing 38–33 to the Montreal Alouettes.

== Players of note ==
=== Canadian Football Hall of Famers ===
- Paul Bennett – inducted as a player in 2002
- John Bonk – inducted as a player in 2008
- Ralph "Dieter" Brock – inducted as a player in 1995
- Less Browne – inducted as a player in 2002
- Bob Cameron – inducted as a player in 2010
- Tom "Citation" Casey – inducted as a player in 1964
- Arthur Chipman – inducted as a builder in 1969
- Tom Clements – inducted as a player in 1994
- Carl Cronin – inducted as a player in 1967
- Andrew Currie – inducted as a builder in 1974
- Matt Dunigan – inducted as a player in 2006
- Bill Frank – inducted as a player in 2001
- Harry Peter "Bud" Grant – inducted as a builder in 1983
- Tommy Grant – inducted as a player in 1995
- G. Sydney Halter – inducted as a builder in 1966
- Frank Hannibal – inducted as a builder in 1963
- Fritz Hanson – inducted as a player in 1963
- John Helton – inducted as a player in 1985
- Dick Huffman – inducted as a player in 1987
- W.P. "Billy" Hughes – inducted as a builder in 1974
- Jack Jacobs – inducted as a player in 1963
- Eddie James – inducted as a player in 1963
- Gerry James – inducted as a player in 1981
- Greg Kabat – inducted as a player in 1996
- Les Lear – inducted as a player in 1974
- Leo "Lincoln Locomotive" Lewis – inducted as a player in 1973
- Earl Lunsford – inducted as a player in 1983
- Chester "Ches" McCance – inducted as a player in 1976
- Cal Murphy – inducted as a builder in 2004
- James Murphy – inducted as a player in 2000
- Ken Ploen – inducted as a player in 1975
- Joe Poplawski – inducted as a player in 1998
- Russ "The Wisconsin Wraith" Rebholz – inducted as a player in 1963
- Frank Rigney – inducted as a player in 1984
- Joseph B. Ryan – inducted as a builder in 1968
- Karl Slocomb – inducted as a builder in 1989
- Milt Stegall – inducted as a player in 2012
- Art Stevenson – inducted as a player in 1969
- Robert Porter "Buddy" Tinsley – inducted as a player in 1982
- Chris Walby – inducted as a player in 2003
- Bert Warwick – inducted as a builder in 1964
- Charles Roberts – inducted as a player in 2024

=== All-time 75th-Anniversary team ===
- Greg Battle
- Ralph "Dieter" Brock
- Tom Clements
- Herb Gray
- Bob Cameron
- Tom Casey
- Fritz Hanson
- Rick House
- Jack Jacobs
- Gerry James
- Trevor Kennerd
- Leo Lewis
- James Murphy
- Ken Ploen
- Frank Rigney
- Charles Roberts
- Joe Poplawski
- Willard Reaves
- Milt Stegall
- Chris Walby

=== Team members notable elsewhere ===
- Ed Schultz, talk show host
- Ben Hatskin, Winnipeg Jets owner; World Hockey Association chairman
- Tom Europe, The Last 10 Pounds Bootcamp host

=== All-time 90th-Anniversary team ===
Presented June 19, 2020, on TSN

- Bud Grant
- Ken Ploen
- Chris Walby
- John Bonk
- Buddy Tinsley
- Bill Frank
- Stanley Bryant
- Charles Roberts
- Leo Lewis
- Milt Stegall
- Joe Poplawski
- James Murphy
- Rick House
- Trevor Kennerd
- Wade Miller
- Doug Brown
- Tony Norman
- Herb Gray
- Bob Cameron
- Willie Jefferson
- Tyrone Jones
- James West
- Rod Hill
- Greg Battle
- Less Browne
- Jovon Johnson
- Ernie Pitts
- Paul Bennett
- Fritz Hanson
- Gerry James
- Tom Casey

=== Winnipeg Blue Bombers Ring of Honour ===
On June 24, 2016, the Blue Bombers unveiled a Ring of Honour at Investors Group Field on the 200 level just above the suites. As sponsored by the Insurance Brokers Association of Manitoba, the club had announced on June 9 that nine players would be selected for the 2016 season for each regular season home game (through online voting along with guidance from the Bomber history and recognition committee), with Chris Walby being the first to be honored. In each season since, Winnipeg has added to the Ring of Honour once a year, which has included several players and one broadcaster.

Winnipeg Blue Bombers Ring of Honour
| Name | Position | Tenure | Year of induction |
| Chris Walby | OT | 1981–1996 | 2016 |
| Ken Ploen | QB | 1957–1967 | 2016 |
| Gerry James | RB | 1952–1962 | 2016 |
| Milt Stegall | WR / SB | 1995–2008 | 2016 |
| Dieter Brock | QB | 1974–1983 | 2016 |
| Leo Lewis | RB | 1955–1966 | 2016 |
| Bud Grant | End; Coach | 1953–1956; 1957–1966 | 2016 |
| Herb Gray | DE / Guard | 1956–1965 | 2016 |
| Doug Brown | DT | 2001–2011 | 2016 |
| Jack Jacobs | QB | 1950–1954 | 2017 |
| Fritz Hanson | HB | 1935–1946 | 2018 |
| Bob Cameron | P | 1980–2002 | 2019 |
| Bob Irving | Broadcaster | 1973–2021 | 2021 |
| Joe Poplawski | WR / SB | 1978–1986 | 2022 |
| James Murphy | WR | 1982–1990 | 2023 |
| Charles Roberts | RB | 2001–2008 | 2024 |

== See also ==
- Valour FC, defunct Canadian Premier League soccer team formerly owned by Winnipeg Football Club.
- List of fan-owned sports teams
- Canadian Football Hall of Fame
- Canadian football
- Comparison of Canadian and American football
- List of Canadian Football League seasons
- Jimmy Dunn, timekeeper for the Bombers from 1930 to 1972

== Bibliography ==
- Bob Irving (edited by). Blue & Gold: 75 Years of Blue Bomber Glory, 2005. ISBN 1-894283-59-7
- Official statistics of the WIFU, CFC and CFL, 1950 to 2007
- CFL Facts, Figures and Records 1985 to 2007
- Winnipeg Blue Bomber Media Guides 2006 and 2007
