= Urban Bowman =

American-Canadian gridiron football player and coach (1937–2018)

Profile
- Position: Tackle

Personal information
- Born: November 16, 1937; Westminster, Maryland, U.S.
- Died: February 25, 2018 (aged 80); Winnipeg, Manitoba, Canada

Career information
- High school: Westminster High School (Westminster, Maryland)
- College: University of Delaware

Career history

Coaching
- 1961: Delaware (Freshman Line)
- 1962: Dayton (Freshman Head Coach)
- 1963: Lebanon Valley College (Line)
- 1964–68: Colorado State (Line)
- 1971: Hamilton Tiger-Cats (Defensive Coordinator)
- 1972–1973: Edmonton Eskimos (Defensive Line)
- 1983: Bemidji State (Asst.)
- 1984: Purdue (Linebackers)
- 1985–1988: Winnipeg Blue Bombers (Defensive Line/Special Teams)
- 1989: Ottawa Rough Riders (Offensive Line)
- 1990: Edmonton Eskimos (Defensive Line)
- 1991–1993: Winnipeg Blue Bombers (Defensive Line/Special Teams)
- 1992: Winnipeg Blue Bombers (Interim Head Coach)
- 1994: Ottawa Rough Riders (Defensive Coordinator)
- 1995–1997: Hamilton Tiger-Cats (Asst. Head Coach/Special Teams/Defensive Line)
- 1997: Hamilton Tiger-Cats (Interim Head Coach)
- 1998: Mansfield (Defensive Line)
- 1999: Mansfield (Offensive Line)
- 2000: Toronto Argonauts (Special Teams)
- 2004: Winnipeg Blue Bombers (Special Teams)
- 2005: Winnipeg Blue Bombers (Linebackers)

Operations
- 1970–71: Colorado State (Asst. Athletic Director)

Urban M. Bowman Jr. (November 16, 1937 – February 25, 2018) was an American-Canadian gridiron football player and coach who served as the interim head coach of the Winnipeg Blue Bombers and Hamilton Tiger-Cats.

== Early life ==
Bowman was born on November 16, 1937, in Westminster, Maryland. Bowman was an all-state tackle at Westminster High School. He attended the University of Delaware and played for their football team.

After graduating in 1959, Bowman joined the United States Army, where he won the Army Commendation Medal for sustained acts of heroism or meritorious service.

During his youth, Bowman served as a waiter in the Baltimore Colts' dining room during training camp, which was held in his hometown of Westminster, Maryland.

== Coaching career ==
Bowman began his coaching career in 1961 as a volunteer assistant for the Delaware freshman football team. A year later he received his first paid coaching position at the University of Dayton.

After serving as an assistant at Lebanon Valley College and Colorado State, Bowman left coaching to become Colorado State's assistant Athletic director. He decided to return to coaching the following year and contacted Hamilton Tiger-Cats head Al Dorow to inquire about any possible coaching vacancies. Due to an ongoing dispute with team president Ralph Sazio over the hiring and firing of assistant coaches, Dorow decided to hire whoever the next applicant for the coaching position was, and Bowman was hired on the spot. He was let go after one season and joined the coaching staff of the Edmonton Eskimos as a defensive line coach.

Bowman left coaching again in 1974, but later returned as an assistant at Bemidji State. He returned to the CFL in 1985 as the defensive line and special teams coach of the Winnipeg Blue Bombers. He left the Bombers in 1989 to become the Ottawa Rough Riders' Offensive Line Coach, but returned to Winnipeg in 1991.

In 1992, Bowman was named the Blue Bombers' interim head coach after head coach Cal Murphy had to undergo Heart transplant surgery. He would lead the Winnipeg to an 11-7 record and a first-place finish in the Eastern Division. The Blue Bombers defeated the Hamilton Tiger-Cats 59-11 in the Division Final, but lost to the Calgary Stampeders 24-10 in the 80th Grey Cup.

Murphy returned in 1993 and Bowman moved to his prior position as defensive line and special teams coach. In 1995, he joined the Hamilton Tiger-Cats as assistant head coach. In 1997, he was promoted to interim head coach after Don Sutherin was fired. The Tiger-Cats would win only one of their remaining eleven games and Bowman was let go at the end of season.

Bowman spent the 1998 season as the defensive line coach at Mansfield University of Pennsylvania. After a battle with prostate cancer, Bowman returned to Mansfield the following year as offensive line coach. In 2000, Bowman joined the Toronto Argonauts as special teams coach for the final seven games of the season.

During the 2004 season, Bowman joined the Blue Bombers as special teams coach. He rejoined the Winnipeg coaching staff midway through the following season when linebackers coach Rod Rust left the team to attend to personal matters.

=== Coaching record ===
Team	Year	Regular season					Postseason		
Team	Year	Won	Lost	Ties	Win %	Finish	Won	Lost	Result
WIN	1992	11	7	0	.611	1st in East Division	1	1	Lost in 80th Grey Cup
HAM	1997	1	10	0	.091	4th in East Division	0	0	Missed playoffs
Total		12	17	0	.414	1 Division Championship	1	1	

== Personal life ==
Bowman's first wife died in 1973. He remarried, to second wife Cindy.

Bowman became a citizen of Canada in 1995.

In 2009, Bowman was inducted into the Carroll County Sports Hall of Fame.

== Death ==
On February 25, 2018, the Blue Bombers announced that Bowman had died earlier that day, from prostate cancer. He was 80.
