= Joe Zaleski =

American gridiron football player and coach (1927–2016)

No. 25
- Position: Quarterback

Personal information
- Born: March 19, 1927; New Kensington, Pennsylvania, U.S.
- Died: September 10, 2016 (aged 89); Edmonton, Alberta, Canada

Career information
- College: University of Dayton
- CFL draft: : Los Angelesth overall pick

Career history

Playing
- 1952–1954: Winnipeg Blue Bombers
- 1955: Montreal Alouettes

Coaching
- 1958–1967: Winnipeg Blue Bombers (assistant)
- 1967–1969: Winnipeg Blue Bombers (head)
- 1970–1971: Edmonton Eskimos (assistant)

Joseph John Zaleski (March 19, 1927 – September 10, 2016) was a Canadian football player and coach.

== Early life, education and Marine Corps service ==
Zaleski was born in New Kensington, Pennsylvania in 1927 and attended Warren Consolidated High School in Tiltonsville, Ohio. After graduating from high school, he enlisted in the United States Marine Corps and was stationed at Marine Corps Base Camp Pendleton. While in the Marine Corps, he deployed to Okinawa in the aftermath of World War II. After leaving the Marine Corps, he attended the University of Dayton from 1947 to 1951, where he played on the football team as the starting quarterback for two years. As a senior, he was voted most valuable player in 1950. He graduated in 1951 with a Bachelor of Science in education.

== Career ==
After signing with the Los Angeles Rams one season, without appearing in a game, Zaleski signed with the Winnipeg Blue Bombers of the Western Interprovincial Football Union in 1952. He played there for two years as the backup quarterback and a defensive back, where he was regarded for his ball handling abilities. In 1955, he then signed with the Montreal Alouettes, where he played for one season as reserve quarterback. The following year, in May 1956, Zaleski moved to the Ontario Rugby Football Union where he was a player-coach for the Sarnia Golden Bears, remaining there for two years, leaving in 1957.

In 1958, Zaleski was hired as an assistant coach for his former team, the Blue Bombers, winning the Grey Cup in 1959, 1961 and 1962. He remained in this position with Winnipeg until 1967 when he was named the team's head coach, replacing Bud Grant. As head coach, he compiled a record of 10–37–1 over three seasons and was eventually fired on November 20, 1969. In 1970, he was hired as an assistant coach for the Edmonton Eskimos, a position he retained for two seasons, with him being fired along with another assistant, Al Benecick, on January 3, 1972.

He married Louise Ann Savanyo of Tiltonsville, Ohio, around 1952 with whom he had five children, including a son, Slater, who played in the CFL. She died in Edmonton on November 8, 2013. Zaleski died on September 10, 2016, aged 89.
