= Bert Warwick =

Canadian football League executive

Arthur Herbert Warwick
- Born: 1901
- Died: June 16, 1963 (aged 62); Winnipeg, Canada
- Occupation(s): Football coach and executive

Arthur Herbert Warwick (March 1901 – June 16, 1963) was a Canadian Football League head coach, league executive, and a member of the Canadian Football Hall of Fame.

== Career ==
Warwick played quarterback at St. John's College. In 1934 he began coaching the Manitoba YMHA football team. Warwick then took over the reins at St. Paul's College and then served as an assistant coach with the Winnipeg Blue Bombers. He served as the team's head coach in 1945 and led it to the Grey Cup final, losing out to the Toronto Argonauts.

He served as president of the Winnipeg Junior Bombers and later as chairman of the rules committee for the CFL and the Canadian Rugby Union for eight years. In all, he worked in Canadian football for more than five decades in one position or another. He was elected to the Canadian Football Hall of Fame in 1964. In 2004 he was elected to the Manitoba Sports Hall of Fame.

Warwick died of a heart attack in Winnipeg on June 16, 1963, aged 62.
