= Slater Zaleski =

Profile
- Positions: Wide receiver, Slotback

Personal information
- Born: January 15, 1966 [Winnipeg Manitoba]
- Died: June 27, 1993 (aged 27); Alberta, Canada
- Listed height: 5 ft 11 in (1.80 m)
- Listed weight: 180 lb (82 kg)

Career history
- 1988: Edmonton Eskimos
- 1989: Toronto Argonauts
- 1989–1990: Saskatchewan Roughriders

Joseph Slater Zaleski (January 15, 1966 – June 27, 1993) was a Canadian professional football player who played for the Edmonton Eskimos, Toronto Argonauts, and Saskatchewan Roughriders. The son of Joe Zaleski, he played football for the Edmonton Huskies prior to his CFL career. In 1992, he was studying geography at the University of Alberta. He died suddenly at the age of 27 in 1993.
