= Major Williams (gridiron football) =

American gridiron football player (born 2001)

- Williams with the Winnipeg Blue Bombers in 2026

No. 24 – Winnipeg Blue Bombers
- Position: Defensive back
- Roster status: Active
- CFL status: American

Personal information
- Born: August 31, 2001 (age 25)
- Listed height: 5 ft 11 in (1.80 m)
- Listed weight: 190 lb (86 kg)

Career information
- High school: Dunbar (Fort Myers, Florida)
- College: Virginia (2019); Iowa Central (2020–2021); Carson–Newman (2022–2024)
- NFL draft: 2025: undrafted

Career history
- Kansas City Chiefs (2025)*; Winnipeg Blue Bombers (2025–present)
- * Offseason or practice squad member only

Awards and highlights
- 3× First-team All-SAC (2022–2024)
- Stats at CFL.ca

Major Williams (born August 31, 2001) is an American professional football defensive back for the Winnipeg Blue Bombers of the Canadian Football League (CFL). He played college football for the Virginia Cavaliers, Iowa Central Tritons and the Carson–Newman Eagles.

== Early life ==
Williams was born on August 31, 2001. He attended Dunbar High School in Fort Myers, Florida. Williams was a multi-sport athlete, including track and field (where he was a high school state champion in the 4×100-meter relay), basketball and football.

In football, he played as a cornerback and wide receiver. As a junior, Williams recorded 30 tackles, five pass breakups, three interceptions and fumble recovery. In his senior year, he caught four passes for 104 yards, made 31 tackles and five pass breakups. As a three-star recruit, Williams committed to play college football at the University of Virginia.

== College career ==
Williams played college football for the Virginia Cavaliers in 2019, Iowa Central Tritons from 2020 to 2021 and the Carson–Newman Eagles from 2022 to 2024. At Virginia, he played in three games as a true freshman but remained as a redshirt.

Williams transferred to the JUCO Iowa Central Community College, where he played in the 2021 fall season. In 11 games, he made 52 total tackles, including three for loss, two interceptions and six pass breakups. As kick returner, Williams returned 12 kicks for 244 yards and one touchdown.

Williams then transferred again to Carson–Newman University where he played for three years. In 34 games, he made 155 tackles, 3.5 sacks, four interceptions, 26 pass deflections, two forced fumbles and one fumble recovery. As a punt returner, Williams had 620 return yards and two touchdowns. He was a three-time, first-team All-South Atlantic Conference recipient and was named an All-American by D2Football.com.

== Professional career ==
Pre-draft measurables
Height	Weight	Arm length	Hand span	Wingspan	40-yard dash	10-yard split	20-yard split	20-yard shuttle	Three-cone drill	Vertical jump	Broad jump	Bench press
5 ft 11 in (1.80 m)	198 lb (90 kg)	9 1/4 in (0.23 m)	31 1/8 in (0.79 m)	6 ft 1 7/8 in (1.88 m)	4.40 s	1.51 s	2.55 s	4.08 s	6.90 s	37 in (0.94 m)	10 ft 5 in (3.18 m)	20 reps
All values from Pro day

=== Kansas City Chiefs ===
After not being selected in the 2025 NFL draft, Williams signed with the Kansas City Chiefs of the National Football League (NFL) as an undrafted free agent. He was released on August 26, 2025, as part of final roster cut-downs.

=== Winnipeg Blue Bombers ===
On October 2, 2025, Williams was signed to the practice roster of the Winnipeg Blue Bombers of the Canadian Football League (CFL). After not appearing in any games in 2025, he won the starting cornerback job, opposite Jonathan Moxey. Williams recorded his first interception in week 5 against the Hamilton Tiger-Cats.
