= Ethan Vibert =

Canadian gridiron football player (born 2001)

No. 62 – Winnipeg Blue Bombers
- Position: Offensive lineman
- Roster status: Practice roster
- CFL status: National

Personal information
- Born: January 23, 2001 (age 25)
- Listed height: 6 ft 3 in (1.91 m)
- Listed weight: 322 lb (146 kg)

Career information
- High school: Miller (Regina, Saskatchewan)
- College: South Dakota State (2019–2024)
- CFL draft: 2025: 3rd round, 27th overall pick

Career history
- Winnipeg Blue Bombers (2025–present)

Awards and highlights
- 2× FCS national champion (2022, 2023)

Career CFL statistics as of 2025
- Games played: 1
- Stats at CFL.ca

Ethan Vibert (born January 23, 2001) is a Canadian professional football offensive lineman for the Winnipeg Blue Bombers of the Canadian Football League (CFL). He played college football for the South Dakota State Jackrabbits.

== Early life ==
Vibert was born on January 23, 2001. He attended Miller Comprehensive High School in Regina, Saskatchewan.

== College career ==
Vibert played college football for the South Dakota State Jackrabbits from 2019 to 2024. He played in 36 games, starting in 12 as a senior, all as a center and guard. Vibert was a member of the Jackrabbits as they won back-to-back FCS championships in 2022 and 2023.

== Professional career ==
Pre-draft measurables
Height	Weight	40-yard dash	20-yard shuttle	Three-cone drill	Vertical jump	Broad jump	Bench press
6 ft 3 1/2 in (1.92 m)	310 lb (141 kg)	5.43 s	4.71 s	7.83 s	28.5 in (0.72 m)	8 ft 7 in (2.62 m)	20 reps
All values from CFL Combine

Vibert was selected in the third round, with the 27th overall selection, by the Winnipeg Blue Bombers in the 2025 CFL draft. On May 2, he officially signed with the team. Vibert spent most of the season the practice roster but was activated for the final game of the regular season against the Montreal Alouettes. In the 2026 season, he has been on and off the practice roster with one appearance against the Edmonton Elks on June 25.
