= Jovan Santos-Knox =

American gridiron football player (born 1993)

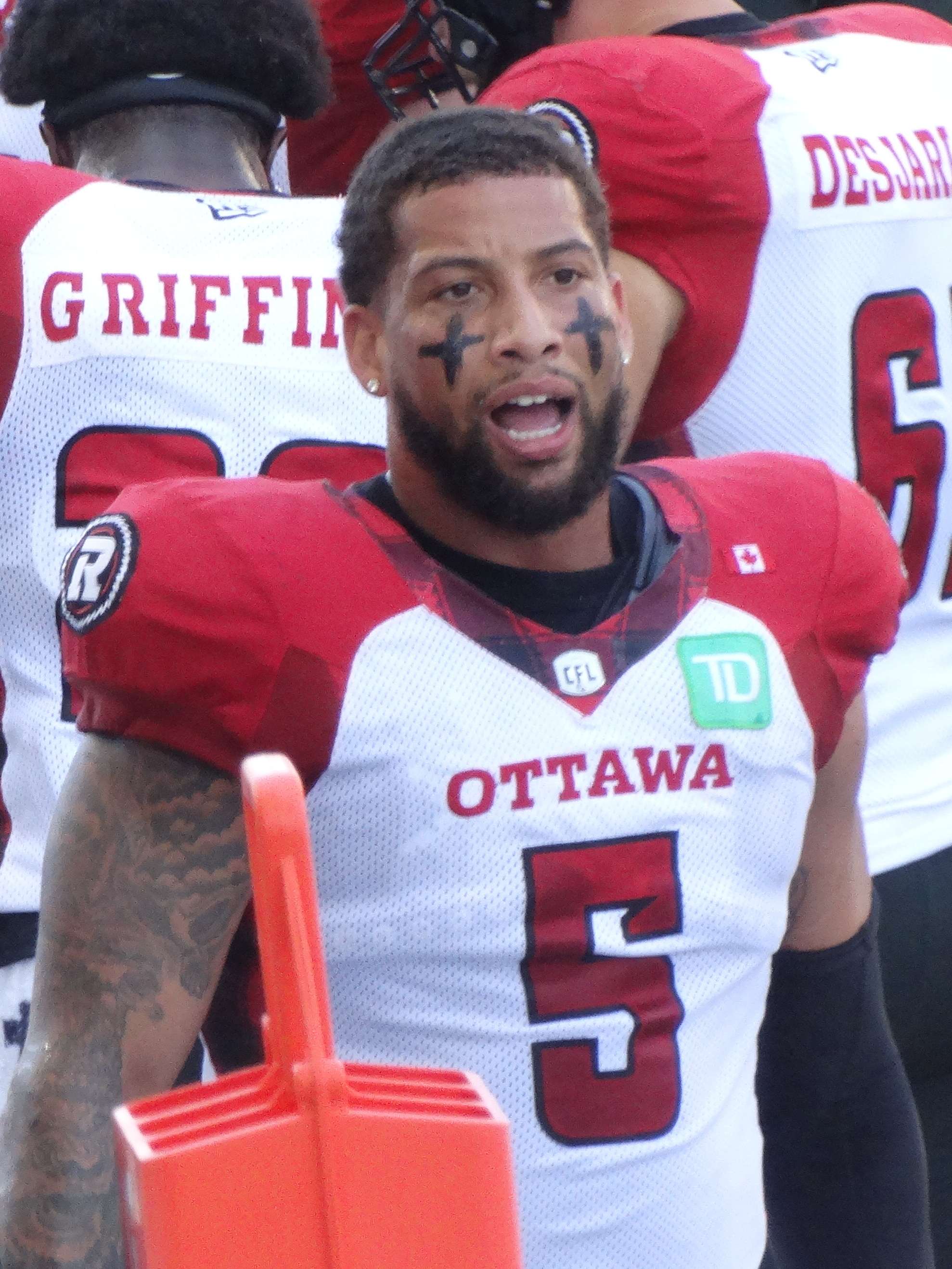
- Santos-Knox with the Ottawa Redblacks in 2025

Winnipeg Blue Bombers
- Position: Linebacker
- Roster status: Active
- CFL status: American

Personal information
- Born: July 5, 1994 (age 32); Waterbury, Connecticut, U.S.
- Listed height: 6 ft 2 in (1.88 m)
- Listed weight: 234 lb (106 kg)

Career information
- College: UMass

Career history
- 2017–2018: Winnipeg Blue Bombers
- 2019: Edmonton Eskimos
- 2021–2022: Hamilton Tiger-Cats
- 2023–2025: Ottawa Redblacks
- 2026–present: Winnipeg Blue Bombers

Awards and highlights
- CFL East All-Star (2022); First-team All-MAC (2014); Second-team All-MAC (2015)

Career CFL statistics as of 2025
- Games played: 111
- Defensive tackles: 528
- Special teams tackles: 21
- Sacks: 16
- Forced fumbles: 4
- Interceptions: 5
- Stats at CFL.ca

Jovan Santos-Knox (born July 5, 1994) is an American professional football linebacker for the Winnipeg Blue Bombers of the Canadian Football League (CFL). He played college football at UMass.

== Professional career ==
Pre-draft measurables
Height	Weight	Arm length	Hand span	Wingspan	40-yard dash	10-yard split	20-yard split	20-yard shuttle	Three-cone drill	Vertical jump	Broad jump	Bench press
6 ft 2 1/4 in (1.89 m)	236 lb (107 kg)	31 in (0.79 m)	8 in (0.20 m)	6 ft 7 3/8 in (2.02 m)	4.81 s	1.65 s	2.73 s	4.47 s	7.31 s	32.0 in (0.81 m)	9 ft 10 in (3.00 m)	12 reps
All values from Pro Day

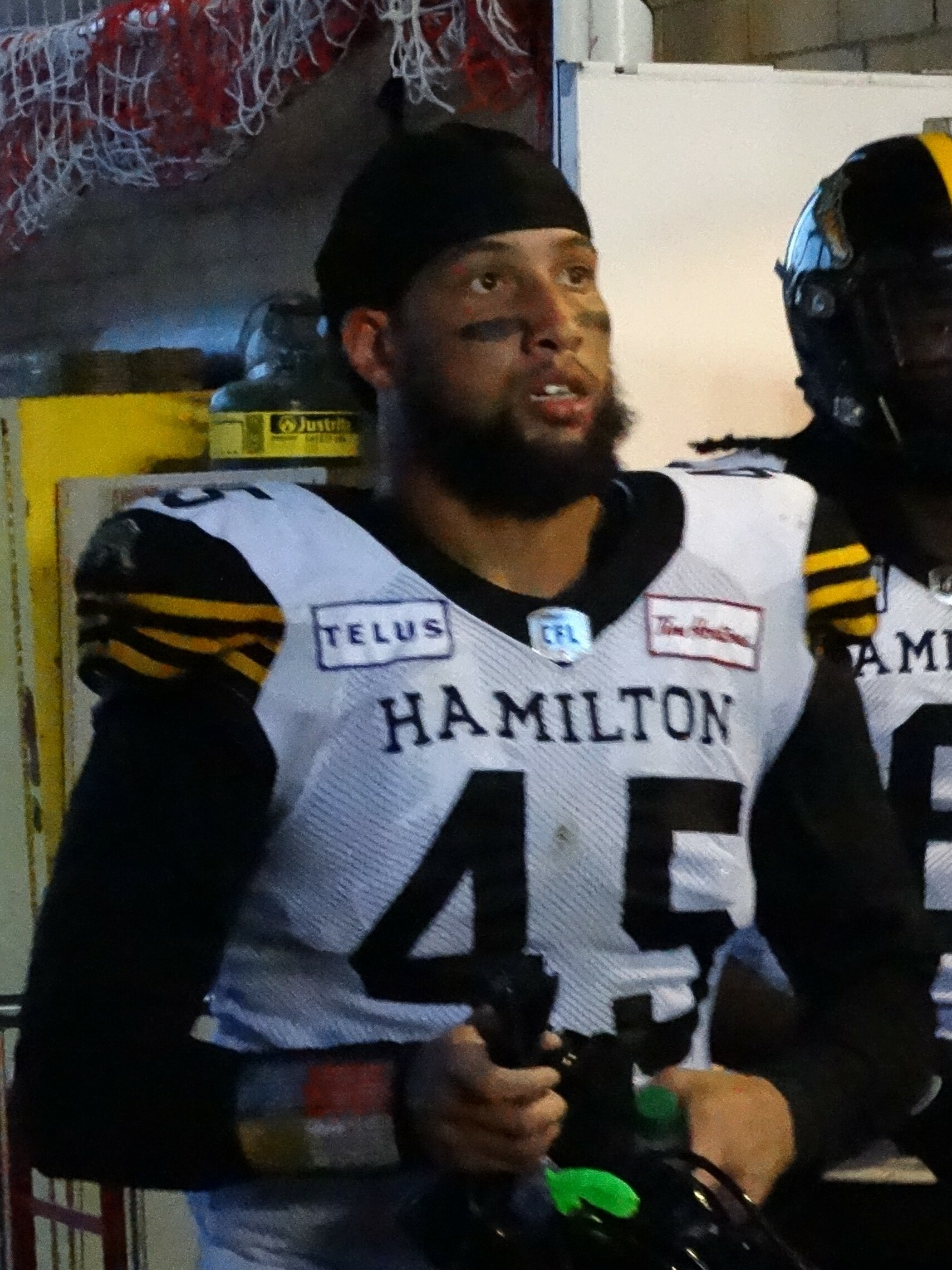
Santos-Knox with the Hamilton Tiger-Cats in 2022

=== Winnipeg Blue Bombers (first stint) ===
Santos-Knox was signed by the Winnipeg Blue Bombers after driving nine hours with his father to a tryout camp which his father had found in Charlotte, North Carolina. He started his rookie season on special teams but by the end of the regular season was a starting linebacker and was being praised by coach Mike O'Shea and media for big plays at big moments of games. After recording 10 tackles and 3 sacks against Toronto on July 27, 2018, Santos-Knox was named the CFL's third star of the week.

=== Edmonton Eskimos ===
Santos-Knox spent the 2019 season with the Edmonton Eskimos where he played in three regular season games. After the CFL canceled the 2020 season due to the COVID-19 pandemic, he chose to opt-out of his contract with the Edmonton Eskimos on August 27, 2020.

=== Hamilton Tiger-Cats ===
On February 6, 2021, it was announced that Santos-Knox had signed with the Hamilton Tiger-Cats.

=== Ottawa Redblacks ===
On February 7, 2023, it was announced that Santos-Knox had signed with the Ottawa Redblacks. He played in three seasons where he recorded 209 total tackles, five sacks, and two interceptions. He was released on January 30, 2026.

=== Winnipeg Blue Bombers (second stint) ===
It was announced on February 10, 2026, that Santos-Knox had signed a one-year contract with the Winnipeg Blue Bombers.
