= Vyshonne Janusas =

Canadian football player (born 2001)

No. 82 – Winnipeg Blue Bombers
- Position: Wide receiver
- Roster status: Practice roster
- CFL status: National

Personal information
- Born: January 3, 2001 (age 25); Windsor, Ontario, Canada
- Listed height: 5 ft 11 in (1.80 m)
- Listed weight: 229 lb (104 kg)

Career information
- High school: W.F. Herman Academy (Windsor)
- University: Guelph Gryphons (2020–2024)
- CFL draft: 2025: 5th round, 38th overall pick

Career history
- Calgary Stampeders (2025–2026); Saskatchewan Roughriders (2026); Winnipeg Blue Bombers (2026–present)*
- * Offseason or practice squad member only
- Stats at CFL.ca

Vyshonne Janusas (born January 3, 2001) is a Canadian professional football wide receiver for the Winnipeg Blue Bombers of the Canadian Football League (CFL). He played U Sports football for the Guelph Gryphons.

== University career ==
Janusas played U Sports football for the Guelph Gryphons from 2022 to 2024. He played in 16 games in his career, recording 71 receptions for 1,010 yards and eight touchdowns. Janusas also returned kicks for the Gryphons, doing so 30 times for 800 yards and returning one for a touchdown against the Waterloo Warriors for 109 yards.

== Professional career ==
Pre-draft measurables
Height	Weight	40-yard dash	20-yard shuttle	Three-cone drill	Vertical jump	Broad jump	Bench press
5 ft 11 3/8 in (1.81 m)	221 lb (100 kg)	4.75 s	4.32 s	7.00 s	33.5 in (0.85 m)	10 ft 1 7/8 in (3.10 m)	17 reps
All values from CFL Combine

=== Calgary Stampeders ===
Janusas was selected in the 38th pick of the fifth round in the 2025 CFL draft by the Calgary Stampeders. He officially signed with the team on May 5, 2025, before being placed onto the practice roster on June 1. Janusas played in his first CFL game on July 12, 2025, against the Saskatchewan Roughriders. He recorded his first catch on July 30, 2025, against the Ottawa Redblacks, finishing with two receptions for 14 yards.

In 2026, Janusas started the first two games of the season for Calgary before landing on the practice squad. He was cut by the Stampeders on July 28, 2026.

=== Saskatchewan Roughriders ===
On August 10, 2026, Janusas signed with the Saskatchewan Roughriders. On September 28, he was released.

=== Winnipeg Blue Bombers ===
On October 6, 2026, Janusas signed with the Winnipeg Blue Bombers practice roster.
