= Dante Daniels =

Canadian gridiron football player (born 2002)

- Daniels with the Winnipeg Blue Bombers in 2026

No. 87 – Winnipeg Blue Bombers
- Position: Tight end
- Roster status: Active
- CFL status: National

Personal information
- Born: February 15, 2002 (age 24); Windsor, Ontario
- Listed height: 6 ft 6 in (1.98 m)
- Listed weight: 272 lb (123 kg)

Career information
- High school: F. J. Brennan (Windsor, Ontario)
- College: Butler CC (2021–2023); NC State (2024–2025)
- CFL draft: 2026: 2nd round, 10th overall pick

Career history
- Winnipeg Blue Bombers (2026–present)

Career CFL statistics as of 2026
- Receptions: 9
- Receiving yards: 95
- Stats at CFL.ca

Dante Daniels (born February 15, 2002) is a Canadian professional football tight end for the Winnipeg Blue Bombers of the Canadian Football League (CFL). Daniels played college football for the Butler Grizzlies and the NC State Wolfpack.

== College career ==
Daniels played college football for the Butler Grizzlies from 2021 to 2023 and the NC State Wolfpack from 2024 to 2025. He redshirted his first year and then played in three contests the following season. In 2023, Daniels role increased, catching nine passes for 133 yards and a touchdown. He entered the transfer portal and committed to NC State on December 10, 2023.

Daniels was initially used as a blocker but was used more for receiving as the season went on. He caught his first Division I touchdown on the road against the North Carolina Tar Heels. In his final season, Daniels made seven catches for 74 yards and a touchdown.

== Professional career ==
Pre-draft measurables
Height	Weight	Arm length	Hand span	Wingspan	40-yard dash	10-yard split	20-yard split	20-yard shuttle	Three-cone drill	Vertical jump	Broad jump	Bench press
6 ft 5 1/2 in (1.97 m)	271 lb (123 kg)	9 1/2 in (0.24 m)	32 1/2 in (0.83 m)	6 ft 8 in (2.03 m)	5.07 s	1.73 s	2.98 s	4.60 s	7.59 s	24.5 in (0.62 m)	9 ft 3 in (2.82 m)	7 reps
All values from Pro day

Daniels was selected with the tenth pick in the second round of the 2026 CFL draft by the Winnipeg Blue Bombers. He was officially signed on April 30, 2026.

== Statistics ==
Legend
**Bold**	Career high

=== College ===
Season	Team	Games	Receiving			
Season	Team	GP	Rec	Yds	Avg	TD
2021	Butler CC	Redshirt				
2022	Butler CC	3	2	14	7.0	0
2023	Butler CC	7	**9**	**133**	**14.8**	**1**
2024	NC State	**13**	3	32	10.7	**1**
2025	NC State	**13**	7	74	10.6	**1**
NJCAA Career		10	11	147	13.4	1
NCAA Career		26	10	106	10.6	2
