= Michael Ayers (Canadian football) =

American gridiron football player (born 1998)

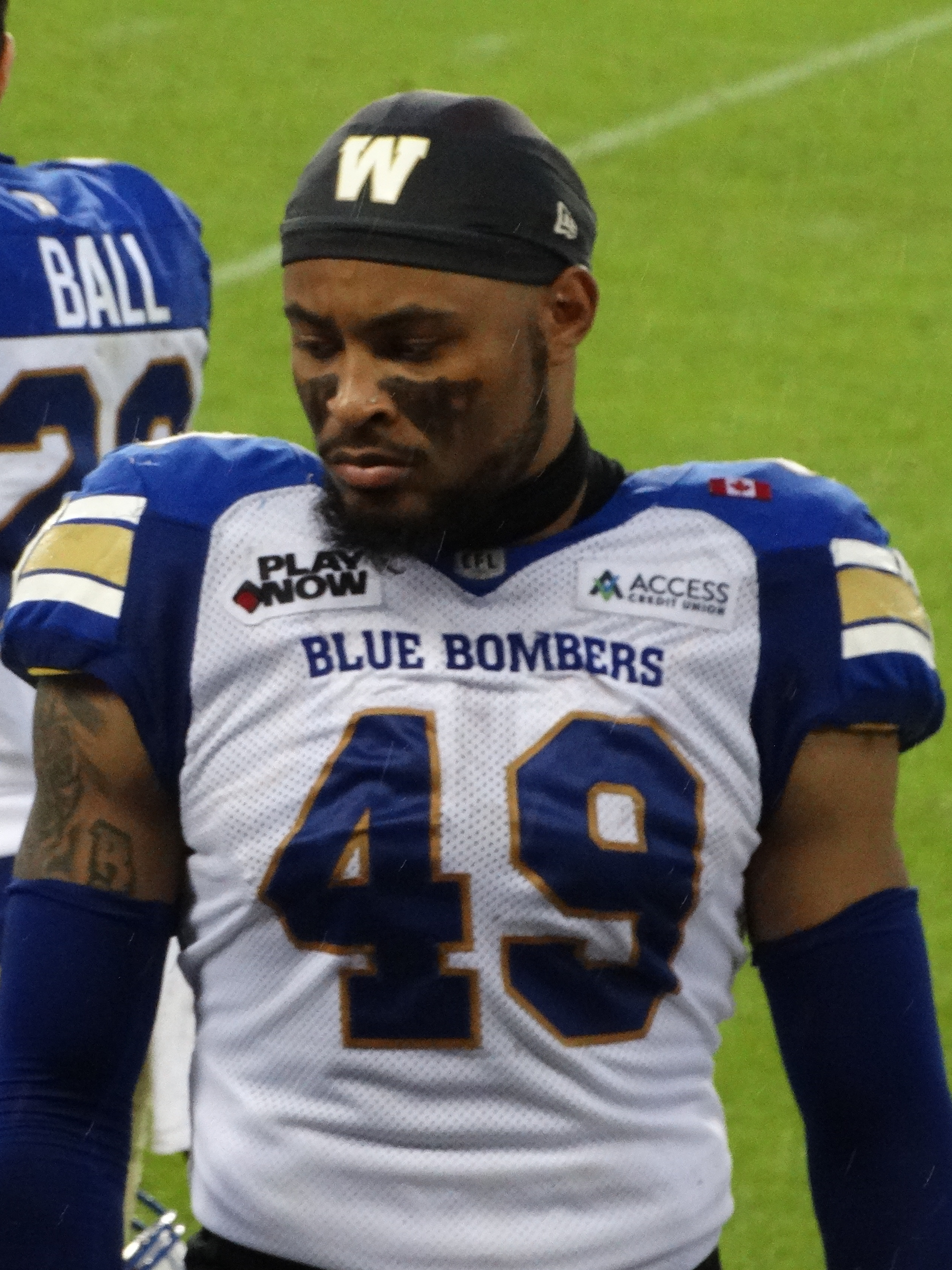
- Ayers with the Winnipeg Blue Bombers in 2025

No. 49 – Winnipeg Blue Bombers
- Position: Linebacker
- Roster status: Active
- CFL status: American

Personal information
- Born: December 31, 1998 (age 27); Columbus, Ohio, U.S.
- Listed height: 6 ft 2 in (1.88 m)
- Listed weight: 226 lb (103 kg)

Career information
- High school: Walnut Ridge High
- College: Ashland (2018–2022)
- NFL draft: 2023: undrafted

Career history
- 2023: Seattle Seahawks*
- 2024–present: Winnipeg Blue Bombers
- * Offseason or practice squad member only
- Stats at CFL.ca

Michael Ayers (born December 31, 1998) is an American professional football linebacker for the Winnipeg Blue Bombers of the Canadian Football League (CFL).

== College career ==
After using a redshirt season in 2017, Ayers played college football for the Ashland Eagles from 2018 to 2022, but did not play in 2020 due to the team's cancelled season. In four seasons, he recorded 48 solo tackles, three sacks, one interception, eight pass breakups, three forced fumbles, and a fumble recovery.

== Professional career ==
Pre-draft measurables
Height	Weight	Arm length	Hand span	Wingspan	40-yard dash	10-yard split	20-yard split	20-yard shuttle	Three-cone drill	Vertical jump	Broad jump	Bench press
6 ft 1 5/8 in (1.87 m)	223 lb (101 kg)	32 3/4 in (0.83 m)	8 7/8 in (0.23 m)	6 ft 6 5/8 in (2.00 m)	4.59 s	1.55 s	2.56 s	4.24 s	6.98 s	38.0 in (0.97 m)	10 ft 5 in (3.18 m)	22 reps
All values from Pro Day

=== Seattle Seahawks ===
After going unselected in the 2023 NFL draft, Ayers was signed by the Seattle Seahawks as an undrafted free agent on April 29, 2023. However, he was released shortly after on May 15, 2023.

=== Winnipeg Blue Bombers ===
On February 2, 2024, Ayers signed with the Winnipeg Blue Bombers. Following training camp in 2024, he made the team's active roster as a backup linebacker. He made his professional debut on June 6, 2024, against the Montreal Alouettes, where he had two special teams tackles, becoming the first former Ashland Eagle to play in the CFL. He later scored his first professional touchdown on August 23, 2024, against the Hamilton Tiger-Cats when he returned a blocked punt 27 yards for the score. He finished the season having played in 17 regular season games, starting in two, where he had 11 defensive tackles, 17 special teams tackles, one sack, one interception, and one fumble recovery. Ayers also played in both post-season games, including the 111th Grey Cup where he had one special teams tackle in the Blue Bombers' 41–24 loss to the Toronto Argonauts.
