= Brody Clark =

Canadian gridiron football player (born 2001)

No. 27 – Winnipeg Blue Bombers
- Position: Linebacker
- Roster status: 6-game injured list
- CFL status: National

Personal information
- Born: November 23, 2001 (age 24); Delta, British Columbia, Canada
- Listed height: 6 ft 0 in (1.83 m)
- Listed weight: 211 lb (96 kg)

Career information
- High school: Seaquam (Delta)
- CJFL: Langley Rams
- University: York (2024–2025)
- CFL draft: 2026: 5th round, 42nd overall pick

Career history
- Winnipeg Blue Bombers (2026–present)

Awards and highlights
- Second-team OUA All-Star (2024)
- Stats at CFL.ca

Brody Clark (born November 23, 2001) is a Canadian professional football linebacker for the Winnipeg Blue Bombers of the Canadian Football League (CFL). He played U Sports football for the York Lions.

== Early life ==
Clark was born on November 23, 2001, in Delta, British Columbia. He attended Seaquam Secondary School in Delta.

== Junior career ==
Clark played three seasons for the Langley Rams of the Canadian Junior Football League (CJFL). He played at receiver for his first two years, before he moved to the defensive side and converted to linebacker. Clark had one catch for 79 yards and one touchdown with 17 tackles and a fumble recovery.

== University career ==
Clark played U Sports football for the York Lions from 2024 to 2025. In ten games, he had 49 tackles, including two for loss, three pass break ups, one forced fumble, one fumble recovery and a blocked kick. Clark was named a second-team Ontario University Athletics All-Star in 2024.

== Professional career ==
Pre-draft measurables
Height	Weight	40-yard dash	20-yard shuttle	Three-cone drill	Vertical jump	Broad jump	Bench press
6 ft 0 3/8 in (1.84 m)	217 lb (98 kg)	4.73 s	4.52 s	7.00 s	35 in (0.89 m)	10 ft 5 3/4 in (3.19 m)	8 reps
All values from CFL Combine

Clark was selected in the fifth round, with the 42nd overall selection, by the Winnipeg Blue Bombers in the 2026 CFL draft. On April 30, he officially signed with the team. Clark made the initial roster in a depth role. In his CFL debut he had two special teams tackles against the Calgary Stampeders. On June 24, Clark was placed on the 6-game injured list. On August 13, he was elevated to the active roster. On September 5, Clark was again placed on the 6-game injured list.
