= David Reese (Canadian football) =

American gridiron football player (born 2000)

- Reese with the Winnipeg Blue Bombers in 2026

No. 45 – Winnipeg Blue Bombers
- Position: Defensive end
- Roster status: Active
- CFL status: American

Personal information
- Born: August 1, 2000 (age 26)
- Listed height: 6 ft 2 in (1.88 m)
- Listed weight: 243 lb (110 kg)

Career information
- High school: Vero Beach (Vero Beach, Florida)
- College: Florida (2018–2022); California (2023–2024); Syracuse (2025)
- NFL draft: 2026: undrafted

Career history
- Winnipeg Blue Bombers (2026–present)
- Stats at CFL.ca

David Reese (born August 1, 2000) is an American professional football defensive end for the Winnipeg Blue Bombers of the Canadian Football League (CFL). He played college football for the Florida Gators, California Golden Bears and Syracuse Orange.

== Early life ==
Reese was born on August 1, 2000. He attended Fort Pierce Central High School in Fort Pierce, Florida, and Vero Beach High School in Vero Beach, Florida. Reese was a four-star recruit coming out of high school and committed to play college football at the University of Florida.

== College career ==
Reese played college football for the Florida Gators from 2018 to 2022, California Golden Bears from 2023 to 2024 and Syracuse Orange in 2025. At Florida, he played in two games in 2018, recording four tackles, and redshirted. In July 2019, Reese suffered a torn Achilles tendon and missed the season. He returned for the 2020 season and played in five games, registering three tackles, but was out for the remainder of the year with a torn patellar tendon. In 2022, Reese played in all 13 games and made two tackles. He was used in multiple positions, first at defensive back and later at linebacker and defensive end.

In 2023, Reese transferred to California where he played for two seasons. In 24 games, he made 58 tackles, including 15.5 tackles for loss, 11 sacks, five pass deflections and five forced fumbles.

Reese transferred again, choosing Syracuse over UNLV and Oklahoma State. In his final collegiate season, he played in 12 games, recording 27 tackles, including 3.5 tackles for loss, three pass break ups and two fumble recoveries.

== Professional career ==
Pre-draft measurables
Height	Weight	Arm length	Hand span	Wingspan	40-yard dash	10-yard split	20-yard split	20-yard shuttle	Three-cone drill	Vertical jump	Broad jump	Bench press
6 ft 2 in (1.88 m)	210 lb (95 kg)	31 3/4 in (0.81 m)	9 1/4 in (0.23 m)	6 ft 7 3/8 in (2.02 m)	4.68 s	1.52 s	2.72 s	4.35 s	7.15 s	37 in (0.94 m)	10 ft 5 in (3.18 m)	22 reps
All values from Pro day

On May 2, 2026, Reese was signed by the Winnipeg Blue Bombers of the Canadian Football League (CFL). On May 30, he was signed to the practice roster. On June 10, Reese was promoted to the active roster.
