= Ridge Texada =

American gridiron football player (born 2002)

No. 26 – Winnipeg Blue Bombers
- Position: Defensive back
- Roster status: Active
- CFL status: American

Personal information
- Born: May 7, 2002 (age 24); Frisco, Texas, U.S.
- Listed height: 5 ft 9 in (1.75 m)
- Listed weight: 187 lb (85 kg)

Career information
- High school: Centennial (Frisco)
- College: McNeese State (2020); North Texas (2021–2024)
- NFL draft: 2025: undrafted

Career history
- Winnipeg Blue Bombers (2025–present)

Awards and highlights
- First-team All-C-USA (2022); Third-team All-AAC (2024)
- Stats at CFL.ca

Ridge Texada (born May 7, 2002) is an American professional football defensive back for the Winnipeg Blue Bombers of the Canadian Football League (CFL). He played college football for the McNeese State Cowboys and North Texas Mean Green.

== Early life ==
Texada was born on May 7, 2002, in Frisco, Texas. He attended Centennial High School in Frisco.

== College career ==
Texada played college football for the McNeese State Cowboys in 2020 and North Texas Mean Green from 2021 to 2024. In seven games at McNeese State, he made ten tackles. On May 26, 2021, Texada transferred to University of North Texas.

In four seasons, Texada played in 52 games, recording 140 tackles, including nine for loss, five interceptions, 32 pass break ups, one forced fumble and one pick-six. He was a first-team All-C-USA selection in 2022 and third-team All-AAC selection in 2024.

== Professional career ==
Pre-draft measurables
Height	Weight	Arm length	Hand span	40-yard dash	10-yard split	20-yard split	20-yard shuttle	Three-cone drill	Vertical jump	Broad jump
5 ft 8 in (1.73 m)	179 lb (81 kg)	28 3/4 in (0.73 m)	8 5/8 in (0.22 m)	4.42 s	1.52 s	2.59 s	4.17 s	7.01 s	33.5 in (0.85 m)	10 ft 1 in (3.07 m)
All values from Pro day

On September 3, 2025, Texada was signed by the Winnipeg Blue Bombers of the Canadian Football League (CFL) to the practice roster. On August 28, 2026, he made his CFL debut against the Montreal Alouettes.

== Personal life ==
Texada comes from a football family, his father, Keith Texada, was a wide receiver at Louisiana Tech, and two older brothers, Ranthony and Raleigh also played football.
