= De'Shaan Dixon =

American football player (born 1998)

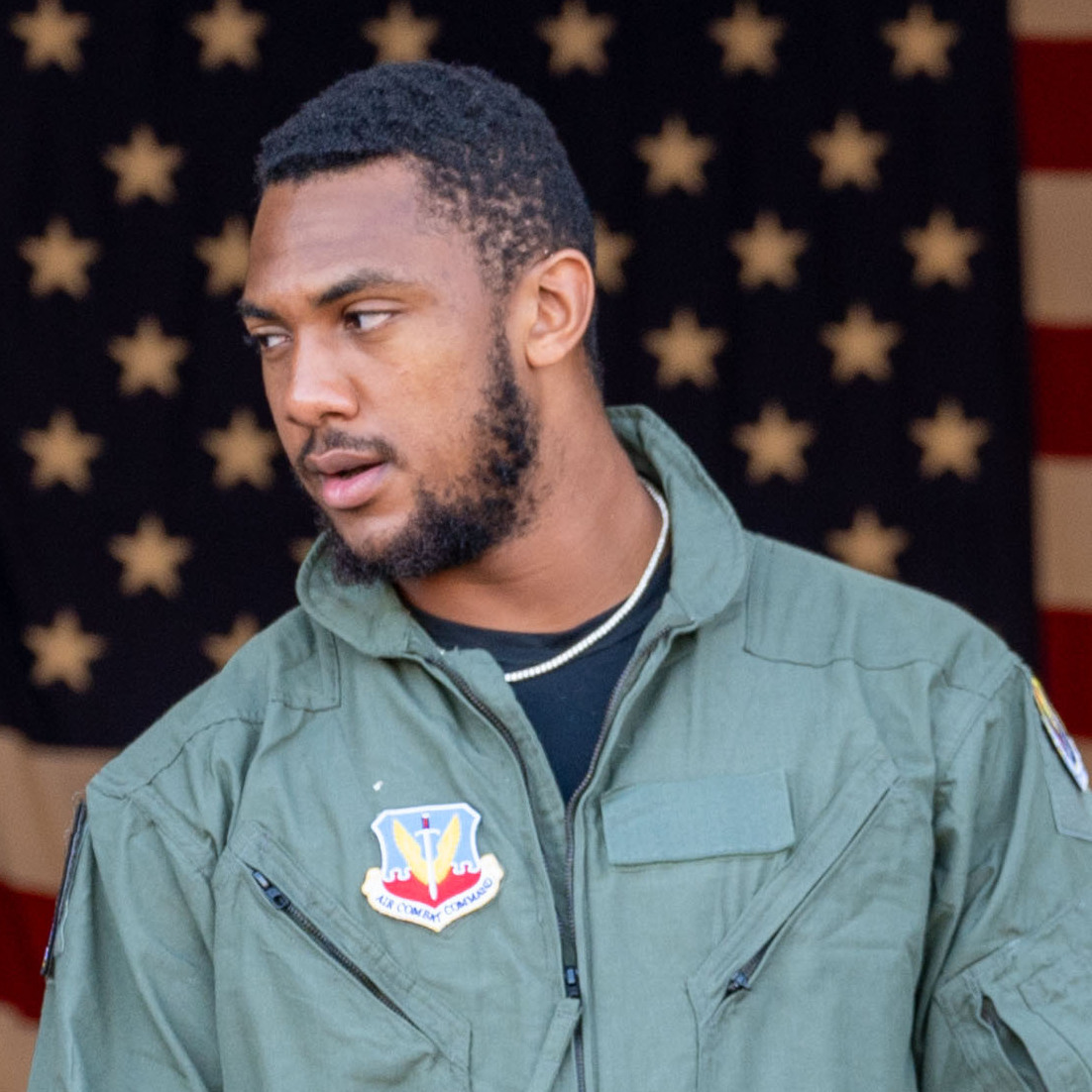
- Dixon in 2023

No. 90 – Winnipeg Blue Bombers
- Position: Defensive end
- Roster status: Practice roster
- CFL status: American

Personal information
- Born: December 16, 1998 (age 27); Chesapeake, Virginia, U.S.
- Listed height: 6 ft 4 in (1.93 m)
- Listed weight: 262 lb (119 kg)

Career information
- High school: Western Branch (Chesapeake)
- College: Norfolk State (2017–2021)
- NFL draft: 2022: undrafted

Career history
- Jacksonville Jaguars (2022–2024); Winnipeg Blue Bombers (2025–present)

Awards and highlights
- First-team All-MEAC (2021); Third-team All-MEAC (2019)

Career NFL statistics
- Total tackles: 1
- Stats at Pro Football Reference
- Stats at CFL.ca

De’Shaan Duane Dixon (born December 16, 1998) is an American professional football defensive end for the Winnipeg Blue Bombers of the Canadian Football League (CFL). He played college football for the Norfolk State Spartans.

== Early life ==
Dixon attended Western Branch High School in Chesapeake, Virginia. He only received two offers to play college football coming out of high school. He verbally committed to Norfolk State over Virginia State on January 26, 2017.

== College career ==
He played at Norfolk State from 2017 to 2021. During his career he had 154 tackles (69 solo), 24.5 tackles for loss, and 14.5 sacks in 42 games. He also had one forced fumble, two fumble recoveries, and 10 pass break ups. After his senior season in 2021, he entered the 2022 NFL draft.

== Professional career ==
Pre-draft measurables
Height	Weight	Arm length	Hand span	Wingspan	40-yard dash	10-yard split	20-yard split	20-yard shuttle	Three-cone drill	Vertical jump	Broad jump	Bench press
6 ft 4 1/4 in (1.94 m)	247 lb (112 kg)	33 1/2 in (0.85 m)	10 3/8 in (0.26 m)	6 ft 9 1/4 in (2.06 m)	4.71 s	1.59 s	2.66 s	4.60 s	7.17 s	34 in (0.86 m)	9 ft 6 in (2.90 m)	15 reps
All values from Norfolk State's Pro Day

=== Jacksonville Jaguars ===
On May 2, 2022, Dixon signed with the Jacksonville Jaguars as an undrafted free agent following the 2022 NFL draft. On August 30, after the final roster cutdown of the preseason, Dixon made the 53-man roster for the 2022 season.

On August 29, 2023, Dixon was waived by the Jaguars and re-signed to the practice squad. He signed a reserve/future contract on January 8, 2024.

Dixon was waived/injured on August 8, 2024, after suffering a torn ACL. He reverted to the Jaguars' injured reserve list after going unclaimed.

=== Winnipeg Blue Bombers ===
On October 13, 2025, Dixon was signed to the practice roster of the Winnipeg Blue Bombers of the Canadian Football League (CFL).
