= Nuer Gatkuoth =

Canadian gridiron football player (born 2002)

No. 40 – Winnipeg Blue Bombers
- Position: Defensive end
- Roster status: Reserve
- CFL status: National

Personal information
- Born: May 3, 2002 (age 24); Edmonton
- Listed height: 6 ft 3 in (1.91 m)
- Listed weight: 233 lb (106 kg)

Career information
- High school: West Toronto Prep (Toronto, Ontario); Austin O'Brien (Edmonton, Alberta); Champion Prep Academy (Atlanta, Georgia)
- College: Colorado State (2022–2024); Wake Forest (2025)
- NFL draft: 2026: undrafted
- CFL draft: 2026: 1st round, 4th overall pick

Career history
- Winnipeg Blue Bombers (2026–present)

Career CFL statistics as of 2026
- Total tackles: 8
- Sacks: 1
- Forced fumbles: 1
- Stats at CFL.ca

Nuer Gatkuoth (born May 3, 2002) is a Canadian professional football defensive end for the Winnipeg Blue Bombers of the Canadian Football League (CFL). He played college football for the Colorado State Rams and Wake Forest Demon Deacons.

== Early life ==
Gatkuoth was born on May 3, 2002. He attended West Toronto Prep in Toronto, Ontario, Austin O'Brien Catholic High School in Edmonton, Alberta, and Champion Prep Academy in Atlanta, Georgia.

== College career ==
Gatkuoth played college football for the Colorado State Rams and Wake Forest Demon Deacons. He redshirted during the 2022 season. In 2023, he appeared in ten games, recording 53 tackles, 0.5 sacks, one interception, three pass deflections and a forced fumble. Gatkuoth was named to the first-team Freshman All-America team by The Athletic.

Ahead of the 2024 season, Gatkuoth suffered a toe injury in preseason camp, resulting in him missing the first four games of the season. He had 15 tackles, including four for loss, one sack and one forced fumble. On December 9, 2024, Gatkuoth entered the transfer portal.

On January 3, 2025, Gatkuoth committed to Wake Forest University. In his lone season at Wake, he had 39 tackles, including 8.5 for loss, six sacks, one interception and one forced fumble. Gatkuoth was a Jon Cornish Trophy finalist in 2025. Due to eligibility issues, he was forced to enter the NFL draft after playing only three seasons of college football.

== Professional career ==
Pre-draft measurables
Height	Weight	Arm length	Hand span	Wingspan	40-yard dash	10-yard split	20-yard split	20-yard shuttle	Three-cone drill	Vertical jump	Broad jump	Bench press
6 ft 3 in (1.91 m)	239 lb (108 kg)	32 1/4 in (0.82 m)	9 in (0.23 m)	6 ft 5 7/8 in (1.98 m)	4.93 s	1.65 s	2.76 s	4.62 s	7.26 s	31 in (0.79 m)	9 ft 10 in (3.00 m)	17 reps
All values from Pro day

Gatkuoth was selected with the fourth pick in the first round of the 2026 CFL draft by the Winnipeg Blue Bombers. On May 12, he officially signed with the team. Gatkuoth made his CFL debut in the season opener against the Calgary Stampeders but did not record any statistics. On July 10, he made his first tackle against the Toronto Argonauts.
