= Jaiden Woodbey =

American football player (born 2000)

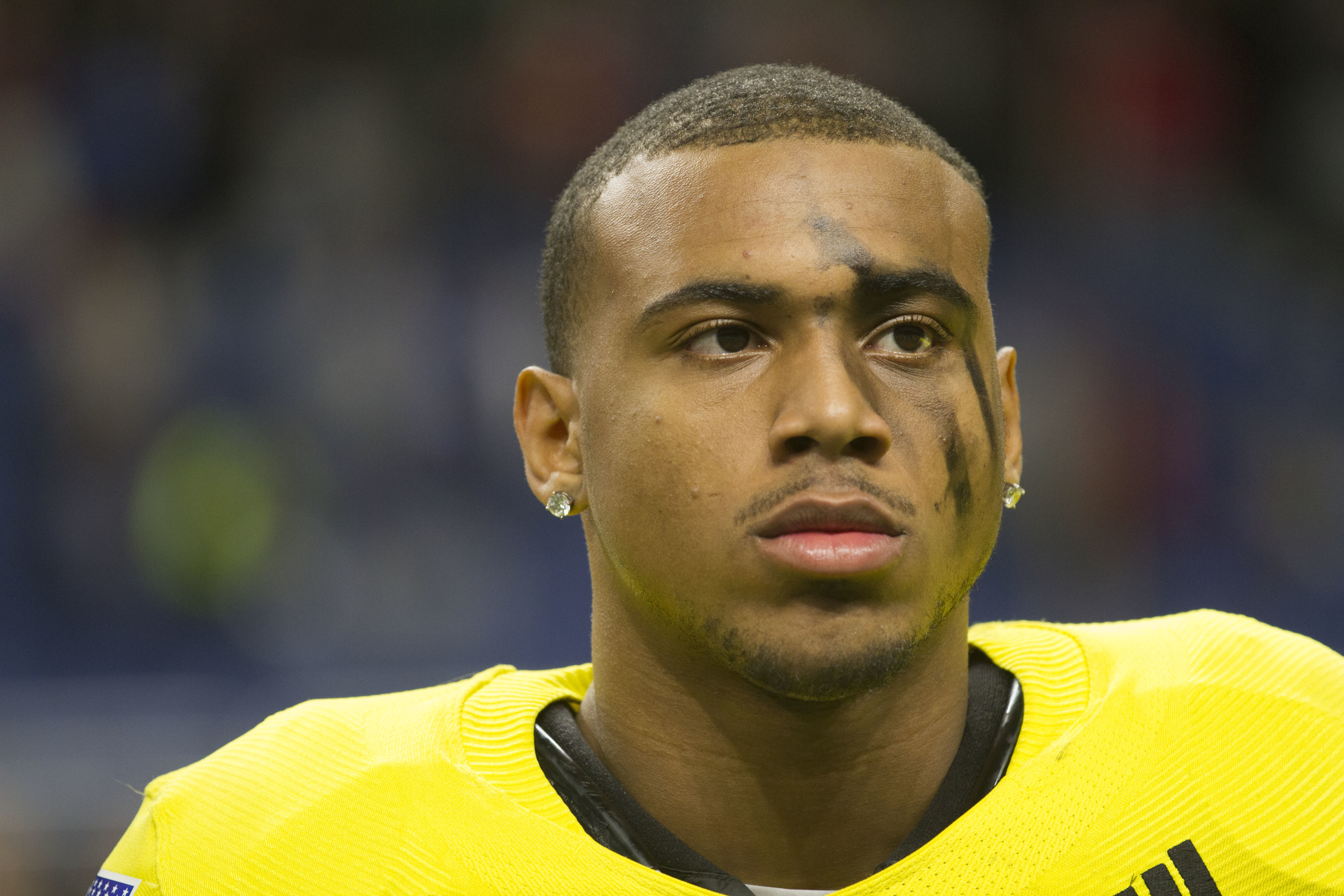
- Woodbey in 2018

No. 3 – Winnipeg Blue Bombers
- Position: Defensive back
- Roster status: Active
- CFL status: American

Personal information
- Born: January 20, 2000 (age 26)
- Listed height: 6 ft 1 in (1.85 m)
- Listed weight: 234 lb (106 kg)

Career information
- High school: Upland (Upland, California); St. John Bosco (Bellflower, California)
- College: Florida State (2018–2020); Boston College (2021–2022)
- NFL draft: 2023: undrafted

Career history
- Los Angeles Rams (2023)*; Massachusetts Pirates (2024); Winnipeg Blue Bombers (2025–present)
- * Offseason or practice squad member only

Career IFL statistics
- Total tackles: 31
- Pass deflections: 2
- Stats at Pro Football Reference
- Stats at CFL.ca

Jaiden Woodbey (born January 20, 2000) is an American professional football defensive back for the Winnipeg Blue Bombers of the Canadian Football League (CFL). Woodbey played college football for the Florida State Seminoles and the Boston College Eagles. He also had stints with the Los Angeles Rams of the National Football League (NFL) and the Massachusetts Pirates of the Indoor Football League (IFL).

== Early life ==
Woodbey was born January 20, 2000, in Fontana, California. He attended St. John Bosco High School in Bellflower, California. Woodbey was a four-star recruit, ranked as No. 55 overall prospect nationally by 247Sports. As a junior, he won the CIF State Football Championship. He originally committed to Ohio State University before he flipped his commitment to Florida State University on signing day.

== College career ==
Woodbey played college football for the Florida State Seminoles from 2018 to 2020 and the Boston College Eagles from 2021 to 2022. As a true freshman, he made 58 tackles, including 4.5 for loss, one sack, eight pass breakups and one forced fumble. For his efforts, he was named to ESPN's Freshman All-America team. In his sophomore season, he appeared in four games before suffering a torn ACL, MCL, and meniscus in his left knee, ending his season. Woodbey made his return to the field the following season, playing eight games, where he recorded 28 tackles, including 1.5 tackles for loss and one pass breakup.

Woodbey transferred to Boston College for the 2021 season, starting in all 12 games, registering 56 tackles, including 3.5 tackles for loss, 0.5 sack, two interceptions, two fumble recoveries, three pass breakups and recovered and returned a fumble for a touchdown. In his final year he had 79 tackles and two pass deflections.

== Professional career ==
Pre-draft measurables
| Height | Weight | Arm length | Hand span | Wingspan | 40-yard dash | 10-yard split | 20-yard split | 20-yard shuttle | Three-cone drill | Vertical jump | Broad jump | Bench press |
|---|---|---|---|---|---|---|---|---|---|---|---|---|
| 6 ft 0 3/4 in (1.85 m) | 222 lb (101 kg) | 32 1/4 in (0.82 m) | 9 3/4 in (0.25 m) | 6 ft 8 in (2.03 m) | 4.87 s | 1.67 s | 2.73 s | 4.14 s | 6.97 s | 35 in (0.89 m) | 9 ft 6 in (2.90 m) | 20 reps |
All values from Pro Day

=== Los Angeles Rams ===
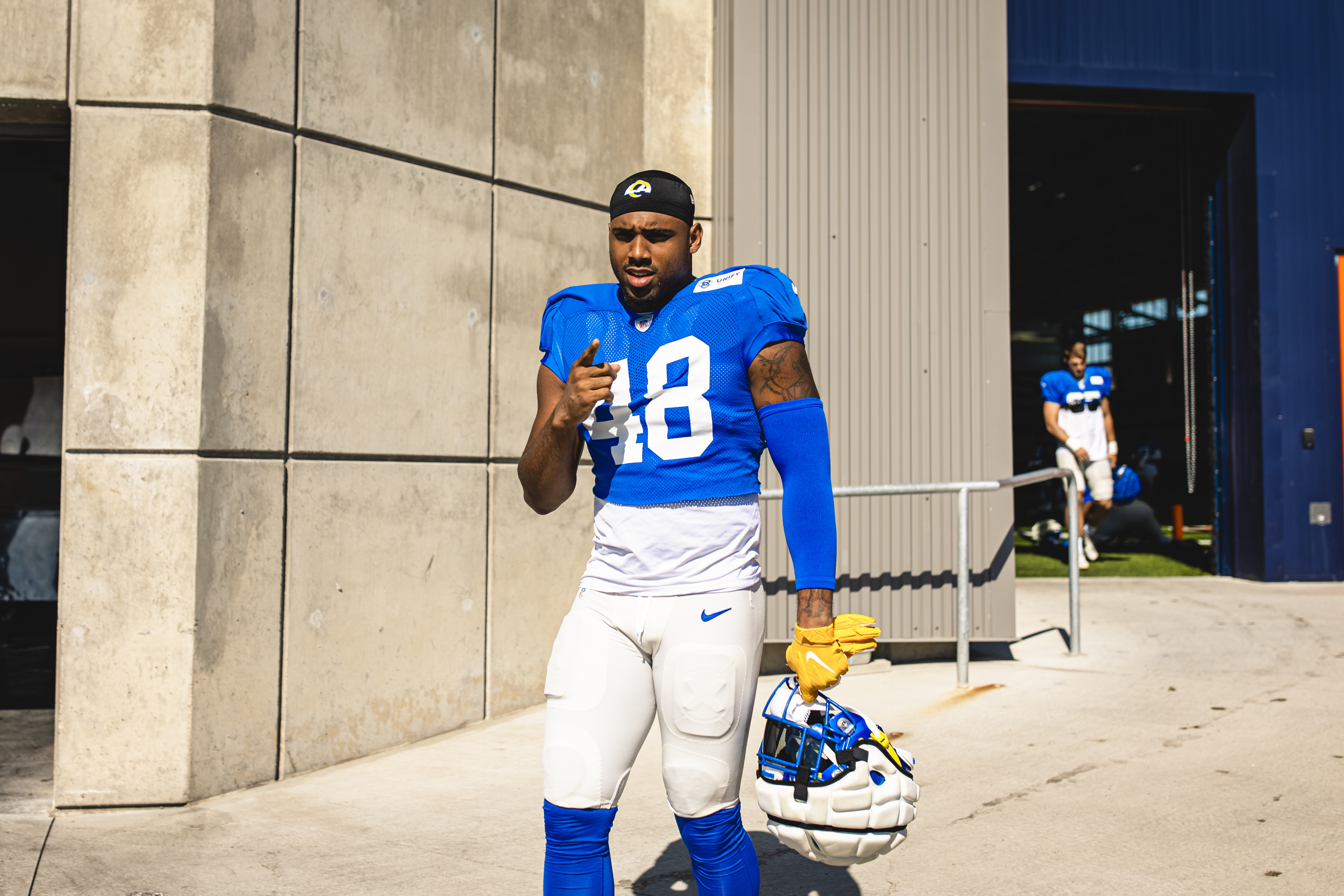
Woodbey with the Los Angeles Rams in 2023

After not being selected in the 2023 NFL draft, Woodbey signed with the Los Angeles Rams as an undrafted free agent. He was waived on May 15, 2023, but was then re-signed on May 17. He was released by the team on August 29 as part of roster cut downs.

=== Massachusetts Pirates ===
On May 10, 2024, it was announced that the Massachusetts Pirates of the IFL, signed Woodbey. He played as a linebacker and defensive back for the Pirates in nine games, recording 31 tackles, including 2.5 tackles for loss and two pass deflections. Woodbey re-signed with the team on November 23, 2024.

=== Winnipeg Blue Bombers ===
On March 3, 2025, Woodbey signed with the Winnipeg Blue Bombers of the Canadian Football League (CFL). On June 1, he was assigned to the practice roster. He made his CFL debut on August 31 against the Saskatchewan Roughriders recording two defensive and one special teams tackle.
