= Joey Corcoran =

Canadian gridiron football player (born 2000)

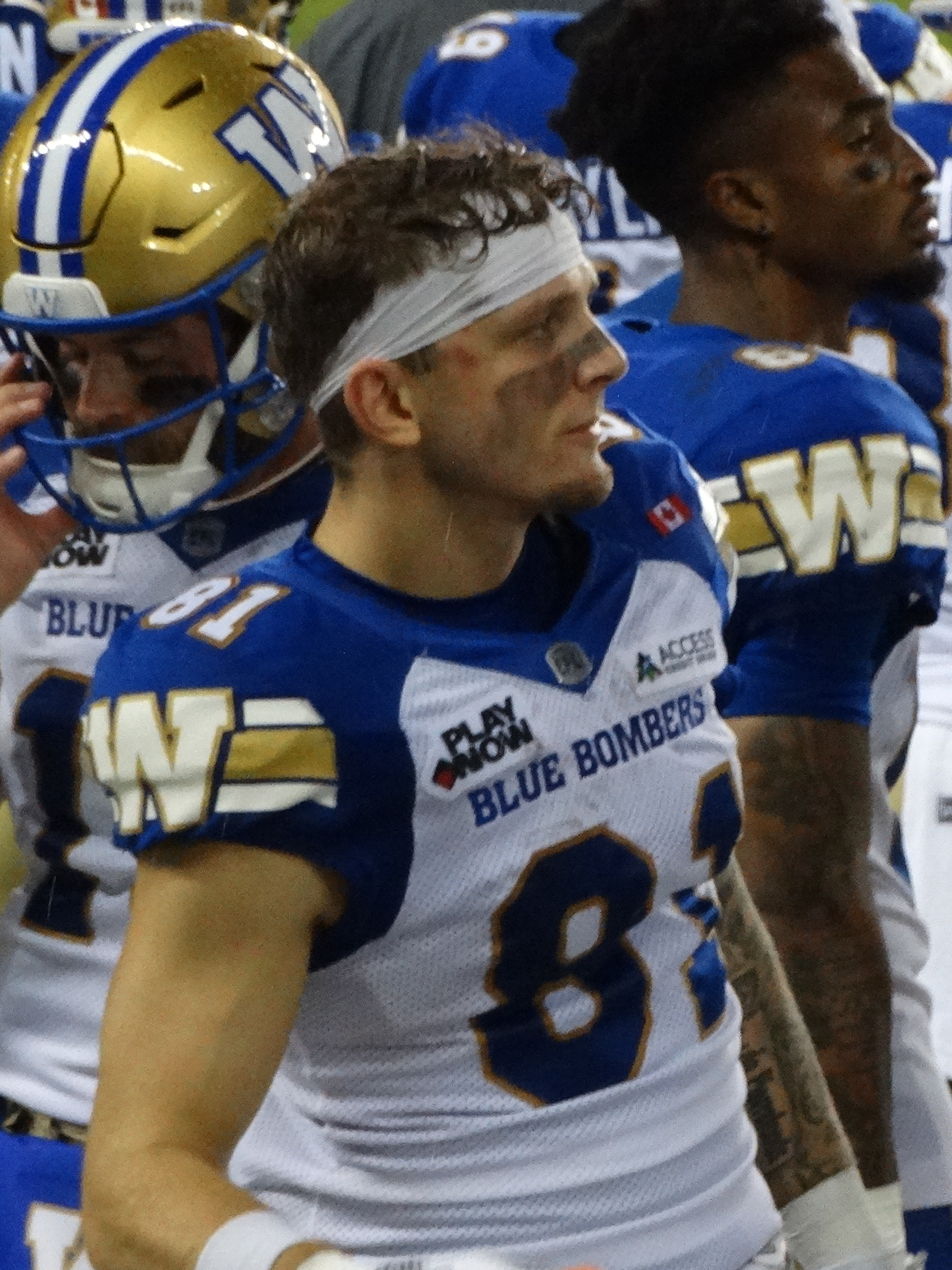
- Corcoran with the Winnipeg Blue Bombers in 2025

No. 81 – Winnipeg Blue Bombers
- Position: Wide receiver
- Roster status: Practice roster
- CFL status: National

Personal information
- Born: December 14, 2000 (age 25); Montreal, Quebec, Canada
- Listed height: 6 ft 1 in (1.85 m)
- Listed weight: 206 lb (93 kg)

Career information
- High school: St. Paul's School (Concord, New Hampshire)
- College: New Hampshire (2020–2024)
- CFL draft: 2025: 5th round, 39th overall pick

Career history
- Winnipeg Blue Bombers (2025–present)

Career CFL statistics as of 2025
- Receptions: 10
- Receiving yards: 88
- Receiving average: 8.8
- Receiving touchdowns: 0
- Stats at CFL.ca

Joey Corcoran (born December 14, 2000) is a Canadian professional football wide receiver for the Winnipeg Blue Bombers of the Canadian Football League (CFL). Corcoran played college football for the New Hampshire Wildcats.

== College career ==
Corcoran played college football for the New Hampshire Wildcats from 2021 to 2024. He played in 35 games and recorded 126 receptions for 1,476 yards and eight touchdowns. In 2024 against Stonehill, Corcoran caught five passes for 129 yards and three touchdowns, in a 45–6 win.

=== College statistics ===
Season	Team	Games	Receiving			
Season	Team	GP	Rec	Yds	Avg	TD
2020	New Hampshire	Redshirt				
2021	New Hampshire	1	1	23	23.0	0
2022	New Hampshire	12	56	670	12.0	3
2023	New Hampshire	10	30	324	10.8	1
2024	New Hampshire	12	39	459	11.8	4
Career		35	126	1,476	11.7	8

== Professional career ==
Pre-draft measurables
Height	Weight	40-yard dash	20-yard shuttle	Three-cone drill	Vertical jump	Broad jump	Bench press
6 ft 0 3/4 in (1.85 m)	208 lb (94 kg)	4.76 s	4.26 s	7.15 s	27.5 in (0.70 m)	9 ft 6 in (2.90 m)	10 reps
All values from CFL Combine

Corcoran was selected in the fifth round with the 39th pick of the 2025 CFL draft by the Winnipeg Blue Bombers. He was signed to the active roster on May 2. He made his CFL debut against the BC Lions on June 13 but did not record any statistics. He caught his first pass in a game against the Calgary Stampeders on July 4, for four yards.
