= Matt Jaworski (Canadian football) =

American gridiron football player (born 2002)

No. 56 – Winnipeg Blue Bombers
- Position: Defensive tackle
- Roster status: Active
- CFL status: American

Personal information
- Born: December 6, 2002 (age 23)
- Listed height: 6 ft 5 in (1.96 m)
- Listed weight: 260 lb (118 kg)

Career information
- High school: Saint Francis (Athol Springs, New York); St. John Paul II (Huntsville, Alabama)
- College: Fordham (2021–2024)
- NFL draft: 2025: undrafted

Career history
- Winnipeg Blue Bombers (2025–present)

Awards and highlights
- Patriot League Defensive Player of the Year (2024); 2× First-team All-Patriot League (2023, 2024)

Career CFL statistics as of 2025
- Games played: 1
- Tackles: 1
- Sacks: 1
- Stats at CFL.ca

Matt Jaworski (born December 6, 2002) is an American professional football defensive tackle for the Winnipeg Blue Bombers of the Canadian Football League (CFL). He played college football for the Fordham Rams.

== Early life ==
Jaworski was born on December 6, 2002. He attended Saint Francis High School in Athol Springs, New York and St. John Paul II Catholic High School in Huntsville, Alabama. Jaworski was second-team All-State as a junior and Defensive Player of the Year (4A) as a senior.

== College career ==
Jaworski played college football for the Fordham Rams from 2021 to 2024. In 41 games, he had 167 tackles, including 42.5 for loss, 19.5 sacks, eight pass deflections, six forced fumbles and two blocked kicks. Jaworski was twice a first-team All-Patriot League recipient and was named the Patriot League Defensive Player of the Year in 2024. As a senior, he was named a finalist for the Buck Buchanan Award.

== Professional career ==
On October 2, 2025, Jaworski was signed by the Winnipeg Blue Bombers of the Canadian Football League (CFL) to the practice roster. On October 24, he was elevated to the active roster. Jaworski played in one game against the Montreal Alouettes and made one tackle and one sack. On October 31, he was placed on the injured list.

On May 1, 2026, Jaworski was moved to the retired list whilst recovering from a car accident in March. On August 8, he was moved to the practice roster. On September 11, Jaworski was elevated to the active roster and made his 2026 debut the nest day.
