= Ethan Stuart =

Canadian gridiron football player (born 2002)

- Stuart with the Winnipeg Blue Bombers in 2026

No. 7 – Winnipeg Blue Bombers
- Position: Defensive back
- Roster status: Active
- CFL status: National

Personal information
- Born: January 17, 2002 (age 24)
- Listed height: 6 ft 0 in (1.83 m)
- Listed weight: 219 lb (99 kg)

Career information
- High school: Iroquois Ridge (Oakville, Ontario)
- University: McMaster (2021–2025)
- CFL draft: 2026: 4th round, 33rd overall pick

Career history
- Winnipeg Blue Bombers (2026–present)
- Stats at CFL.ca

Ethan Stuart (born January 17, 2002) is a Canadian professional football defensive back for the Winnipeg Blue Bombers of the Canadian Football League (CFL). He played U Sports football for the McMaster Marauders.

== Early life ==
Stuart was born on January 17, 2002. He attended Iroquois Ridge High School in Oakville, Ontario, where he played just one year of football as a senior.

== U Sports career ==
Stuart played U Sports football for the McMaster Marauders from 2021 to 2025. In 35 games, he had 122 tackles, including three for loss, two sacks, three interceptions, eight pass break ups and one fumble recovery.

== Professional career ==
Pre-draft measurables
Height	Weight	40-yard dash	20-yard shuttle	Three-cone drill	Vertical jump	Broad jump	Bench press
6 ft 0 1/4 in (1.84 m)	223 lb (101 kg)	4.63 s	4.01 s	6.82 s	33.5 in (0.85 m)	9 ft 9 1/2 in (2.98 m)	15 reps
All values from CFL Combine

Stuart was selected with the 33rd pick in the fourth round of the 2026 CFL draft by the Winnipeg Blue Bombers. On May 1, he officially signed with the team. Stuart made his CFL debut in the season opener against the Calgary Stampeders, recording no statistics. He made his first tackle on July 5, against the Hamilton Tiger-Cats. On July 22, Stuart was moved to the practice roster. On October 2, he was elevated to the active roster in a depth role.
