= Jonathan Moxey =

American gridiron football player (born 1995)

- Moxey with the Winnipeg Blue Bombers in 2026

Winnipeg Blue Bombers
- Position: Defensive back
- Roster status: Active
- CFL status: American

Personal information
- Born: January 14, 1995 (age 31); West Palm Beach, Florida, U.S.
- Listed height: 5 ft 10 in (1.78 m)
- Listed weight: 202 lb (92 kg)

Career information
- High school: William T. Dwyer (Palm Beach Gardens, Florida)
- College: Boise State
- NFL draft: 2017: undrafted

Career history
- Tampa Bay Buccaneers (2017)*; Arizona Cardinals (2017–2019)*; Calgary Stampeders (2019–2023); Hamilton Tiger-Cats (2024–2025); Winnipeg Blue Bombers (2026–present)
- * Offseason or practice squad member only

Awards and highlights
- CFL West All-Star (2022); Second-Team All-Mountain West (2016)
- Stats at Pro Football Reference
- Stats at CFL.ca

Jonathan Moxey (born January 14, 1995) is an American professional football defensive back for the Winnipeg Blue Bombers of the Canadian Football League (CFL). He played college football at Boise State, and was signed by the Tampa Bay Buccaneers as an undrafted free agent in 2017.

== Professional career ==
Pre-draft measurables
Height	Weight	Arm length	Hand span	Wingspan	40-yard dash	10-yard split	20-yard split	20-yard shuttle	Three-cone drill	Vertical jump	Broad jump	Bench press
5 ft 9 5/8 in (1.77 m)	188 lb (85 kg)	31 in (0.79 m)	9 1/2 in (0.24 m)	6 ft 2 1/2 in (1.89 m)	4.57 s	1.55 s	2.59 s	4.05 s	6.96 s	33.0 in (0.84 m)	10 ft 1 in (3.07 m)	17 reps
All values from Pro Day

=== Tampa Bay Buccaneers ===
Moxey signed with the Tampa Bay Buccaneers as an undrafted free agent on May 1, 2017. He was waived on September 2, 2017 and was signed to the Buccaneers' practice squad the next day. He was released on September 19, 2017.

=== Arizona Cardinals ===
On December 27, 2017, Moxey was signed to the Arizona Cardinals' practice squad. He signed a reserve/future contract with the Cardinals on January 2, 2018. On September 1, 2018, Moxey was waived by the Cardinals. He was re-signed to their practice squad on December 18, 2018. He signed a reserve/future contract with the Cardinals on December 31, 2018. He was waived on May 10, 2019.

=== Calgary Stampeders ===
Moxey signed with the Calgary Stampeders on June 24, 2019. He played in his first game on July 25, 2019 against the Ottawa Redblacks where he had one special teams tackle. Overall, he played in five regular season games for the Stampeders in 2019 and made two tackles on defense and two tackles on special teams. He did not play in 2020 due to the cancellation of the 2020 CFL season and was signed to an extension on December 29, 2020.

On October 16, 2021, in a game against the BC Lions, Moxey scored his first career CFL touchdown after intercepting a Michael Reilly pass and returning it 53 yards for a score. He finished his second season in the CFL having played in 13 games and contributed with 24 defensive tackles, 4 special teams tackles, two interceptions and one touchdown. Moxey continued to play an important role in the Stampeders' defense, playing in 16 regular season games and amassing a league leading 13 pass break ups, 26 defensive tackles and two tackles on special teams. Following the 2022 season he was named a CFL West division All-Star. On January 20, 2023, Moxey and the Stamps agreed to a two-year contract extension. However, on May 3, 2024, he was released by the Stampeders.

=== Hamilton Tiger-Cats ===
On June 3, 2024, it was announced that Moxey had signed with the Hamilton Tiger-Cats. He became a free agent upon the expiry of his contract on February 10, 2026.

=== Winnipeg Blue Bombers ===
On February 10, 2026, it was announced that Moxey had signed with the Winnipeg Blue Bombers.
