= 2026 BC Lions season =

CFL team season

- General manager: Ryan Rigmaiden
- President: Duane Vienneau
- Head coach: Buck Pierce
- Home stadium: BC Place Stadium

Results
- Record: 10–8
- Division place: 2nd, West
- Playoffs: Lost West Final
- Team MOP: Nathan Rourke
- Team MODP: Darnell Sankey
- Team MOC: Nathan Rourke
- Team MOOL: Kory Woodruff
- Team MOST: Sean Whyte
- Team MOR: Parker McKenna

Uniform

The 2026 BC Lions season was the 68th season for the team in the Canadian Football League (CFL) and their 72nd overall. The Lions qualified for the playoffs for the fifth straight year following their week 19 victory over the Ottawa Redblacks. They won their Western Conference Semi-Finals matchup 33-26 against the Saskatchewan Roughriders, the team who eliminated them the previous two seasons. The following week they were eliminated in the West Final by the Edmonton Elks, falling behind after a field goal from Elks Kicker Vincent Blanchard broke a fourth quarter 16-16 tie, eventually losing 28-16 after giving up a late touchdown to seal the defeat. The team played two early regular season home games outside of Vancouver due to the 2026 FIFA World Cup games being hosted by BC Place Stadium from June 13, 2026, to July 7, 2026.

The 2026 CFL season was the second season for Buck Pierce as the team's head coach and the second season for Ryan Rigmaiden as the team's general manager.

The Lions hosted their training camp at Hillside Stadium in Kamloops for the 16th consecutive season.

== Offseason ==
=== CFL Canadian draft ===
The 2026 CFL draft took place on April 28, 2026. The Lions had seven selections in the eight-round draft after trading their second-round selection to the Toronto Argonauts for Dejon Allen and swapping a second-round pick for a third-round in the Vernon Adams trade. Not including traded picks or forfeitures, the team selected seventh in each round of the draft, after finishing second in the 2025 league standings.

Round	Pick	Player	Position	School
1	7	Nate DeMontagnac	WR	North Dakota
2	15	Jett Elad	DB	Rutgers
4	36	Pierre Kemeni	DB	Ohio
5	45	Nick Cenacle	WR	Hawaii
6	54	Ethan Graham	OL	Regina
7	63	Chase Henning	DB	British Columbia
8	72	Ebenezer Dibula	DL	Kennesaw State

=== CFL global draft ===
The 2026 CFL global draft took place on April 29, 2026. The Lions had two selections in the draft, holding the seventh pick in each round.

Round	Pick	Player	Position	School	Nationality
1	7	Brett Thorson	P	Georgia	Australia
2	16	Seydou Traore	TE	Mississippi State	England

== Preseason ==
On September 26, 2025, the Lions announced that their pre-season game would be played in Langford at Starlight Stadium for the second consecutive season.

=== Schedule ===
Week	Game	Date	Kickoff	Opponent	Results		TV	Venue	Attendance	Summary
Week	Game	Date	Kickoff	Opponent	Score	Record	TV	Venue	Attendance	Summary
A	Bye									
B	1	Sat, May 23	2:00 p.m. PCT	vs. Edmonton Elks	L 16–34	0–1	CFL+	Starlight Stadium	6,126	Recap
C	2	Fri, May 29	5:30 p.m. PCT	at Winnipeg Blue Bombers	W 30–19	1–1	CFL+	Princess Auto Stadium	26,269	Recap

# Games played with blackout uniforms.

== Regular season ==
On September 26, 2025, it was announced that the Lions would play their first two regular season home games in Kelowna at the Apple Bowl with an expanded capacity of 17,500 seats. On November 24, 2025, the Lions announced that they would play the first game on June 27, 2026, against the Calgary Stampeders, and the second game would take place the following week on July 4, 2026, against the Edmonton Elks. The remainder of the schedule was released on December 9, 2025.

=== Standings ===
West Division
Team	GP	W	L	Pts	PF	PA	Div	Stk	
Edmonton Elks	18	13	5	26	541	435	7–3	L1	Details
BC Lions	18	10	8	20	516	484	5–5	L2	Details
Saskatchewan Roughriders	18	10	8	20	486	473	5–5	W2	Details
Winnipeg Blue Bombers	18	9	9	18	475	492	4–6	W1	Details
Calgary Stampeders	18	9	9	18	632	587	4–6	W1	Details

=== Schedule ===
Week	Game	Date	Kickoff	Opponent	Results		TV	Venue	Attendance	Summary
Week	Game	Date	Kickoff	Opponent	Score	Record	TV	Venue	Attendance	Summary
1	Bye									
2	1	Sat, June 13	4:00 p.m. PCT	at Saskatchewan Roughriders	L 27–31	0–1	TSN/CBSSN	Mosaic Stadium	30,168	Recap
3	2	Fri, June 19	4:30 p.m. PCT	at Hamilton Tiger-Cats	L 27–41	0–2	TSN	Hamilton Stadium	20,402	Recap
4	3	Sat, June 27	4:00 p.m. PCT	vs. Calgary Stampeders	L 33–41	0–3	TSN/CBSSN	Apple Bowl	19,108	Recap
5	4	Sat, July 4	4:00 p.m. PCT	vs. Edmonton Elks	W 36–24	1–3	TSN	Apple Bowl	19,803	Recap
6	Bye									
7	5	Fri, July 17	6:00 p.m. PCT	at Edmonton Elks	L 17–19	1–4	TSN/RDS2	Commonwealth Stadium	20,020	Recap
8	6	Sat, July 25	4:00 p.m. PCT	vs. Toronto Argonauts	L 12–26	1–5	TSN/RDS2/CBSSN	BC Place	21,438	Recap
9	7	Thu, July 30	5:30 p.m. PCT	at Winnipeg Blue Bombers	W 35–19	2–5	TSN/RDS	Princess Auto Stadium	31,509	Recap
10	8	Sat, Aug 8	4:00 p.m. PCT	vs. Hamilton Tiger-Cats	W 27–24	3–5	TSN/CBSSN	BC Place	19,387	Recap
11	9	Thu, Aug 13	6:00 p.m. PCT	at Calgary Stampeders	W 30–26	4–5	TSN/RDS2/CBSSN	McMahon Stadium	17,076	Recap
12	10	Sun, Aug 23	4:00 p.m. PCT	vs. Saskatchewan Roughriders	W 30–16	5–5	TSN	BC Place	30,083	Recap
13	11	Sun, Aug 30	4:00 p.m. PCT	at Ottawa Redblacks	W 45–24	6–5	TSN/RDS2/CBSSN	TD Place Stadium	13,727	Recap
14	12	Fri, Sept 4	4:30 p.m. PCT	at Montreal Alouettes	L 30–37	6–6	TSN/RDS	Molson Stadium	22,752	Recap
15	13	Sat, Sept 12	7:00 p.m. PCT	vs. Montreal Alouettes	W 48–29	7–6	TSN/RDS	BC Place	23,380	Recap
16	Bye									
17	14	Fri, Sept 25	7:30 p.m. PCT	vs. Saskatchewan Roughriders	W 31–24	8–6	TSN	BC Place	24,183	Recap
18	15	Sat, Oct 3	12:00 p.m. PCT	at Toronto Argonauts	W 24–17	9–6	TSN/CTV	BMO Field	13,974	Recap
19	16	Fri, Oct 9	7:00 p.m. PCT	vs. Ottawa Redblacks	W 41–20	10–6	TSN/RDS	BC Place	22,083	Recap
20	17	Sat, Oct 17	4:00 p.m. PCT	at Calgary Stampeders	L 13–32	10–7	TSN	McMahon Stadium	21,968	Recap
21	18	Fri, Oct 23	7:00 p.m. PCT	vs. Winnipeg Blue Bombers	L 10–34	10–8	TSN	BC Place	30,833	Recap

# Games played with blackout uniforms.
# Games played with Pacific frost uniforms.

== Post-season ==
=== Schedule ===
Game	Date	Kickoff	Opponent	Results		TV	Venue	Attendance	Summary
Game	Date	Kickoff	Opponent	Score	Record	TV	Venue	Attendance	Summary
West Semi-Final	Sat, Oct 31	1:30 p.m. PCT	vs. Saskatchewan Roughriders	W 33–26	1–0	TSN/RDS	BC Place	23,283	Recap
West Final	Sat, Nov 7	4:30 p.m. PCT	at Edmonton Elks	L 16–28	1–1	TSN/TSN2/RDS	Commonwealth Stadium		

# Games played with blackout uniforms.
# Games played with Pacific frost uniforms.

== Team ==
=== Roster ===
BC Lions roster
**Quarterbacks**: 14 Chris Oladokun; 12 Nathan Rourke; 19 Kaidon Salter; **Receivers**: 83 Stanley Berryhill III; 86 Jevon Cottoy; 4 Keon Hatcher Sr.; 84 Jermaine Jackson; 88 Hergy Mayala; 18 Justin McInnis; 82 Kieran Poissant; **Running backs**: 20 James Butler; 34 Zander Horvath; **Fullbacks**: 36 Jacob Bond; 45 Riley Pickett	**Offensive linemen**: 51 Michael Couture; 54 Andrew Peirson; 61 Anu "George" Una; 67 Tyran Walker-Hunt; 64 Kory Woodruff; 59 Brandon Yates; **Defensive linemen**: 90 Mathieu Betts; 40 Tibo Debaillie; 48 Hayden Harris; 95 Tomasi Laulile; 93 Lorenzo Mauldin IV; 49 Shaun Peterson Jr.; 2 Casey Sayles; 94 Matt Spatny; 99 Jonah Tavai	**Linebackers**: 35 Woodly Appolon; 46 Ben Hladik; 31 Adam Konar; 32 Maxime Rouyer; 53 Darnell Sankey; 50 Wesley Steiner; **Defensive backs**: 29 Cristophe Beaulieu; 0 Robert Carter Jr.; 33 Jackson Findlay; 13 Pierre Kemeni; 21 Ronald Kent Jr.; 6 T. J. Lee III; 23 Stantley Thomas-Oliver III; 9 Deontai Williams Sr.; **Special teams**: 41 Cam Foran LS; 17 Carl Meyer P; 10 Sean Whyte K	**Reserve roster**: 25 Emani Bailey RB; 3 C. J. Coldon Jr. DB; 66 Lorenzo Thompson OL; **1-game injured**: 98 Levi Bell DL; 77 T. J. Burke DL; 91 Nathan Cherry DL; 16 Nate DeMontagnac WR; 96 David Gusta DL; 8 Seven McGee WR; 42 Parker McKenna DB; 1 Garry Peters DB; 24 Patrice Rene DB; **6-game injured**: 55 Isiah Cage OL; 85 Nick Cenacle WR; 58 Joshua Coker OL; 65 Joshua Donovan OL; 39 Jett Elad DB; 70 Mark McNamee K; 28 Dawson Pierre LB; 26 Tyson Russell DB; 57 Chris Schleuger OL	**Practice roster**: 68 Alex Berwick OL; 89 Michael Fitzgerald II WR; 44 Thomas Graham Jr. DB; 47 Chase Henning LB; 37 Mac McCain III DB; 43 Jordan Oladokun DB; 87 Ben Patterson WR; 69 Ivory Scott Jr. OL; 80 Jaden Williams WR; **Suspended list**: 96 Bradlee Anae DL; -- Derwin Gray OL; 73 Demetrius Taylor DL
Italics indicate American player • **Bold** indicates Global player • 46 Roster, 3 Reserve, 18 Injured, 9 Practice, 3 Suspended; Roster updated 2026-11-06 • Depth chart • Transactions • More CFL rosters

=== Coaching staff ===
BC Lions staff
**Front office and support staff**: Owner – Amar Doman; President and CEO – Duane Vienneau; Senior Vice President, Business – George Chayka; Vice President, Business Operations & Marketing - Carolyn Cody; Vice President, Sales & Service - Colby Fackler; Vice President, Football Operations – Neil McEvoy; General manager – Ryan Rigmaiden; Assistant General Manager – Rob Ralph; Director of US Scouting – Jim Jauch; Manager, Football Operations – Tyler Gammon; U. S. Scout – Will Ark; Video Coordinator – Derek Oswalt; Head Athletic Therapist – Aaron Balson; Equipment Manager – Aaron Yeung	**Head coach**: Head coach/Offensive coordinator – Buck Pierce; **Offensive coaches**: Receivers and Pass Game Coordinator – Kevin Bourgoin; Offensive Line – Paul Charbonneau; Running Backs – Kristian Matte; **Defensive coaches**: Defensive Coordinator – Mike Benevides; Defensive Line – Randy Melvin; Linebackers – Glen Young; Secondary and Pass Game Coordinator – Ryan Phillips; **Special teams coaches**: Special Teams Coordinator – Dennis McKnight; Special Teams Assistant – Derek Oswalt; → Coaching Staff → More CFL staffs
