= 2026 Edmonton Elks season =

CFL team season

- General manager: Ed Hervey
- President: Chris Morris
- Head coach: Mark Kilam
- Home stadium: Commonwealth Stadium

Results
- Record: 13–5
- Division place: 1st, West
- Playoffs: Won Grey Cup
- Team MOP: Cody Fajardo
- Team MODP: Malik Carney
- Team MOC: Joel Dublanko
- Team MOOL: David Beard
- Team MOST: Vincent Blanchard
- Team MOR: T. J. Luther

Uniform
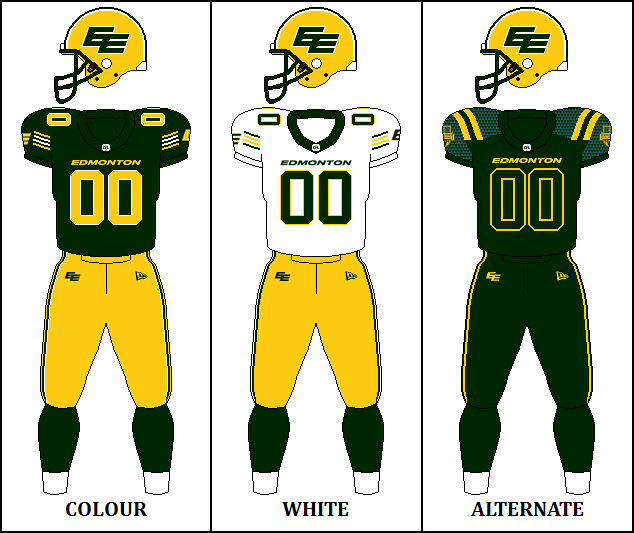

The 2026 Edmonton Elks season was the 68th season for the team in the Canadian Football League (CFL) and their 77th overall. The Elks improved upon their 7–11 record from 2025 and qualified for the playoffs for the first time since 2019 following their victory over the Calgary Stampeders in the Labour Day Rematch on September 12, 2026. The Elks won their 15th Grey Cup championship.

The team's 2026 season was the second season for head coach Mark Kilam and sixth non-consecutive season for general manager Ed Hervey.

== Offseason ==
=== CFL Canadian draft ===
The 2026 CFL draft took place on April 28, 2026. The Elks had nine selections in the eight-round draft. Not including traded picks or forfeitures, the team selected third in each round of the draft, after finishing seventh in the 2024 league standings.

Round	Pick	Player	Position	University Team
1	3	Dariel Djabome	LB	Rutgers
2	12	Benjamin Sangmuah	DB	British Columbia
2	19	Wesley Bailey	DL	Louisville
3	21	Carter Kettyle	WR	Alberta
4	32	Spencer Walsh	OL	Wilfrid Laurier
4	35	Justin Pace	LB	Queen's
6	50	Chris Pashula	OL	Calgary
7	58	Eloa Latendresse-Regimbald	WR/QB	McGill
7	59	Matthew Ljuden	OL	Alberta

=== CFL global draft ===
The 2026 CFL global draft took place on April 29, 2026. The Elks had two selections in the draft, holding the third pick in each round.

Round	Pick	Player	Position	School	Nationality
1	3	Jesús Gómez	K	Arizona State	Mexico
2	12	Jeffrey M'Ba	DL	Southern Methodist	France

== Preseason ==
On February 19, 2026, it was announced that the Edmonton Elks moved their preseason game against the Calgary Stampeders on May 29 to Clarke Stadium due to a World Cup soccer exhibition game being held at Commonwealth Stadium and a temporary grass field in place. Clarke Stadium, located directly beside Commonwealth Stadium, was the former stadium of the Edmonton Eskimos. This was the first time since 1978 that the stadium hosted a professional football game.

=== Schedule ===
Week	Game	Date	Kickoff	Opponent	Results		TV	Venue	Attendance	Summary
Week	Game	Date	Kickoff	Opponent	Score	Record	TV	Venue	Attendance	Summary
A	Bye									
B	1	Sat, May 23	3:00 p.m. MDT	at BC Lions	W 34–16	1–0	CFL+	Starlight Stadium	6,126	Recap
C	2	Fri, May 29	7:00 p.m. MDT	vs. Calgary Stampeders	L 18–21	1–1	CFL+	Clarke Stadium	3,771	Recap

# Games played with primary home uniforms.
# Games played with white uniforms.

== Regular season ==
On November 24, 2025, the Lions announced that they would play a home game in Kelowna at the Apple Bowl on July 4, 2026, against the Elks. The full schedule was released on December 9, 2025.

=== Season standings ===
West Division
Team	GP	W	L	Pts	PF	PA	Div	Stk	
Edmonton Elks	18	13	5	26	541	435	7–3	L1	Details
BC Lions	18	10	8	20	516	484	5–5	L2	Details
Saskatchewan Roughriders	18	10	8	20	486	473	5–5	W2	Details
Winnipeg Blue Bombers	18	9	9	18	475	492	4–6	W1	Details
Calgary Stampeders	18	9	9	18	632	587	4–6	W1	Details

=== Schedule ===
Week	Game	Date	Kickoff	Opponent	Results		TV	Venue	Attendance	Summary
Week	Game	Date	Kickoff	Opponent	Score	Record	TV	Venue	Attendance	Summary
1	1	Sat, June 6	5:00 p.m. MDT	at Ottawa Redblacks	W 29–21	1–0	TSN/RDS/CBSSN	TD Place Stadium	15,038	Recap
2	Bye									
3	2	Sat, June 20	2:00 p.m. MDT	vs. Montreal Alouettes	W 32–29 (OT)	2–0	TSN/RDS	Commonwealth Stadium	14,664	Recap
4	3	Thu, June 25	6:30 p.m. MDT	at Winnipeg Blue Bombers	W 23–18	3–0	TSN	Princess Auto Stadium	32,343	Recap
5	4	Sat, July 4	5:00 p.m. MDT	at BC Lions	L 24–36	3–1	TSN	Apple Bowl	19,803	Recap
6	5	Thu, July 9	7:00 p.m. MDT	vs. Ottawa Redblacks	W 40–17	4–1	TSN	Commonwealth Stadium	15,898	Recap
7	ǁ 6 ǁ	Fri, July 17	7:00 p.m. MDT	vs. BC Lions	W 19–17	5–1	TSN/RDS2	Commonwealth Stadium	20,020	Recap
8	7	Thu, July 23	7:00 p.m. MDT	at Saskatchewan Roughriders	W 36–34	6–1	TSN/RDS/CBSSN	Mosaic Stadium	28,513	Recap
9	8	Sat, Aug 1	5:00 p.m. MDT	vs. Saskatchewan Roughriders	L 26–28	6–2	TSN/CBSSN	Commonwealth Stadium	31,757	Recap
10	9	Sat, Aug 8	1:00 p.m. MDT	at Montreal Alouettes	L 30–48	6–3	TSN/CTV/RDS	Molson Stadium	22,535	Recap
11	10	Sat, Aug 15	1:00 p.m. MDT	vs. Toronto Argonauts	W 42–12	7–3	TSN/CTV	Commonwealth Stadium	22,583	Recap
12	11	Fri, Aug 21	7:30 p.m. MDT	vs. Winnipeg Blue Bombers	W 22–19	8–3	TSN/CBSSN	Commonwealth Stadium	22,805	Recap
13	Bye									
14	12	Mon, Sept 7	4:00 p.m. MDT	at Calgary Stampeders	W 38–28	9–3	TSN/CBSSN	McMahon Stadium	25,698	Recap
15	ǁ 13 ǁ	Sat, Sept 12	5:00 p.m. MDT	vs. Calgary Stampeders	W 53–16	10–3	TSN	Commonwealth Stadium	31,531	Recap
16	14	Sat, Sept 19	1:00 p.m. MDT	at Toronto Argonauts	L 19–24	10–4	TSN/CTV	BMO Field	15,991	Recap
17	15	Sat, Sept 26	5:00 p.m. MDT	vs. Hamilton Tiger-Cats	W 37–35 (3OT)	11–4	TSN	Commonwealth Stadium	20,036	Recap
18	Bye									
19	16	Fri, Oct 9	5:00 p.m. MDT	at Hamilton Tiger-Cats	W 27–12	12–4	TSN	Hamilton Stadium	18,774	Recap
20	ǁ 17 ǁ	Fri, Oct 16	7:30 p.m. MDT	vs. Winnipeg Blue Bombers	W 35–27	13–4	TSN	Commonwealth Stadium	22,492	Recap
21	18	Sat, Oct 24	1:00 p.m. MDT	at Saskatchewan Roughriders	L 9–16	13–5	TSN	Mosaic Stadium	25,521	Recap

# Games played with primary home uniforms.
# Games played with white uniforms.
ǁ # ǁ Games played with alternate uniforms.

== Post-season ==
=== Schedule ===
Game	Date	Kickoff	Opponent	Results		TV	Venue	Attendance	Summary
Game	Date	Kickoff	Opponent	Score	Record	TV	Venue	Attendance	Summary
West Semi-Final	Sat, Oct 31	Bye							
West Final	Sat, Nov 7	5:30 p.m. ABT	vs. BC Lions	W 28–16	1–0	TSN/TSN2/RDS	Commonwealth Stadium	40,182	Recap
113th Grey Cup	Sun, Nov 15	5:00 p.m. ABT	Montreal Alouettes	W 37–30	2–0	TSN/CTV/RDS	McMahon Stadium	32,419	Recap

# Games played with primary home uniforms.

== Team ==
=== Roster ===
Edmonton Elks roster
**Quarterbacks**: 7 Cody Fajardo; 8 Taylor Powell; 14 Cole Snyder; **Running backs**: 24 ShunDerrick Powell; 5 Justin Rankin; **Fullbacks**: 44 Skyler Griffith; **Receivers**: 18 Joshua Cephus; 11 Kaion Julien-Grant; 3 Austin Mack; 81 Zach Mathis; 6 Brendan O'Leary-Orange; 17 Joe Robustelli; 82 Montrell Washington	**Offensive linemen**: 57 David Beard; 53 Brendan Bordner; 65 Mark Korte; 68 Jordan Murray; 64 Carter O'Donnell; 63 Chris Pashula; 67 Coulter Woodmansey; **Defensive linemen**: 91 Jared Brinkman; 2 Malik Carney; 92 Noah Curtis; 95 Tomari Fox; 99 Silas Hubert; 96 Richard Jibunor; 40 Robbie Smith; 42 Noah Taylor; 90 Jordan Williams	**Linebackers**: 48 Nick Anderson; 45 Dariel Djabome; 50 Joel Dublanko; 38 Eteva Mauga-Clements; 49 Justin Pace; **Defensive backs**: 23 Tyshon Blackburn; 30 Tyrell Ford; 25 Chelen Garnes; 13 Kordell Jackson; 20 Kenny Logan Jr.; 41 Terez Reid; 29 J. J. Ross; 0 Kobe Williams; **Special teams**: 26 Vincent Blanchard K; 35 Bradley Hladik LS; 10 Jake Julien P	**Reserve**: 66 Joe Cooper OL; 22 Javon Leake RB/KR; **1-game injured list**: 47 D. K. Bonhomme DL; 69 Brett Boyko OL; 52 Luke Burton-Krahn LS; 32 Leonard Johnson DB; 80 Carter Kettyle WR; 34 Isaiah Knight RB; 88 T. J. Luther WR; 9 Royce Metchie DB; 97 Gavin Meyer DL; 43 Brock Mogensen LB; 46 Jacob Plamondon FB; 16 Benjamin Sangmuah DB; 54 Tyron Vrede LB; **6-game injured list**: 4 Brandon Barlow DL	**Practice roster**: 58 Elijah Alston DL; 79 Carmine Bastone DL; 93 Francis Bemiy DL; 85 Jalon Calhoun WR; 62 Cam Carter OL; 61 Arvin Hosseini OL; 59 Nash Jones OL; 33 Jaaron Joseph DB; 37 Isiah King LB; 27 Ladarius Tennison DB; **Suspended**: 63 Greg Eiland OL; 84 Odieu Hiliare WR; 94 Darien Newell DL; 51 Alex Raich LB
Italics indicate American player • **Bold** indicates Global player • 45 Active, 2 Reserve, 14 Injured, 10 Practice, 4 Suspended; Roster updated 2026-11-14 • Depth chart • Transactions • More CFL rosters

=== Coaching staff ===
Edmonton Elks staff
**Front office**: Owner – Deb Thompson; President and CEO – Chris Morris; General manager – Ed Hervey; Senior Assistant General Manager – Spencer Zimmerman; Direct of U.S. Scouting – Spencer Boehm; Direct of Canadian Scouting – Rich Massaro; Direct of Football Operations – Nick Pelletier; Football Operations Assistant – Nic Cross; Equipment Manager – Dan Rosnau; **Head coaches**: Head coach – Mark Kilam; Assistant Head Coach/Offensive Coordinator – Jordan Maksymic; **Offensive coaches**: Offensive Line and Run Game Coordinator – Stephen Sorrells; Running Backs – Jabari Arthur; Receivers – Jason Tucker	**Defensive coaches**: Defensive Coordinator and Linebackers – J. C. Sherritt; Defensive Line – Cedric Douglas; Defensive Backs – Aaron Grymes; Defensive Quality Control – Danny Nesbitt; Defensive Analyst – Anthony Vitale; **Special teams coach**: Special Teams Coach – Des Catellier; **Strength and conditioning**: Strength and Conditioning Specialist – Danelle Tucker; → Coaching staff → More CFL staffs
