= 2022 Rutgers Scarlet Knights football team =

American college football season

2022 Rutgers Scarlet Knights football
- Conference: Big Ten Conference
- Record: 4–8 (1–8 Big Ten)
- Head coach: Greg Schiano (14th season)
- Offensive coordinator: Sean Gleeson (3rd season)
- Offensive scheme: Spread
- Defensive coordinator: Joe Harasymiak (1st season)
- Base defense: 4–3 or 4–2–5
- Home stadium: SHI Stadium

Uniform

2022 Big Ten Conference football standings
	Conf.			Overall
Team	W		L	W		L
East Division
No. 3 Michigan xy$^	9	–	0	13	–	1
No. 4 Ohio State ^	8	–	1	11	–	2
No. 7 Penn State	7	–	2	11	–	2
Maryland	4	–	5	8	–	5
Indiana	2	–	7	4	–	8
Rutgers	1	–	8	4	–	8
Michigan State†	0	–	6	0	–	7
West Division
Purdue xy	6	–	3	8	–	6
Illinois	5	–	4	8	–	5
Iowa	5	–	4	8	–	5
Minnesota	5	–	4	9	–	4
Wisconsin	4	–	5	7	–	6
Nebraska	3	–	6	4	–	8
Northwestern	1	–	8	1	–	11
Championship: Michigan 43, Purdue 22
^ – College Football Playoff participant; $ – Conference champion; x – Division champion/co-champions; y – Championship game participant; † — NCAA vacated all wins for Michigan State (5–7, 3–6); Rankings from AP Poll

The 2022 Rutgers Scarlet Knights football team was an American football team that represented Rutgers University in the East Division of the Big Ten Conference during the 2022 NCAA Division I FBS football season. Greg Schiano was in the third year of his second stint (14th overall season) as Rutgers' head coach.

The Scarlet Knights played their home games at SHI Stadium in Piscataway, New Jersey.

== Schedule ==
Date	Time	Opponent	Site	TV	Result	Attendance
September 3	12:00 p.m.	at Boston College*	Alumni Stadium; Chestnut Hill, MA	ACCN	W 22–21	35,048
September 10	4:00 p.m.	Wagner*	SHI Stadium; Piscataway, NJ	BTN	W 66–7	47,621
September 17	2:00 p.m.	at Temple*	Lincoln Financial Field; Philadelphia, PA	ESPN+	W 16–14	33,297
September 24	7:00 p.m.	Iowa	SHI Stadium; Piscataway, NJ	FS1	L 10–27	53,117
October 1	3:30 p.m.	at No. 3 Ohio State	Ohio Stadium; Columbus, OH	BTN	L 10–49	104,245
October 7	7:00 p.m.	Nebraska	SHI Stadium; Piscataway, NJ	FS1	L 13–14	53,752
October 22	12:00 p.m.	Indiana^{†}	SHI Stadium; Piscataway, NJ	BTN	W 24–17	43,255
October 29	2:30 p.m.	at Minnesota	Huntington Bank Stadium; Minneapolis, MN	BTN	L 0–31	49,368
November 5	7:30 p.m.	No. 5 Michigan	SHI Stadium; Piscataway, NJ	BTN	L 17–52	51,117
November 12	12:00 p.m.	at Michigan State	Spartan Stadium; East Lansing, MI	BTN	L 21–27	63,267
November 19	3:30 p.m.	No. 11 Penn State	SHI Stadium; Piscataway, NJ	BTN	L 10–55	55,676
November 26	12:00 p.m.	at Maryland	Maryland Stadium; College Park, MD	BTN	L 0–37	21,974
*Non-conference game; ^{†}Homecoming; Rankings from AP and CFP Rankings, after November 1 - Released prior to game; All times are in Eastern time

== Game summaries ==
=== At Boston College ===
	1	2	3	4	Total
Scarlet Knights	0	6	9	7	22
Eagles	7	7	7	0	21

=== Wagner ===
	1	2	3	4	Total
Seahawks	0	7	0	0	7
Scarlet Knights	28	10	14	14	66

=== At Temple ===
	1	2	3	4	Total
Scarlet Knights	3	7	3	3	16
Owls	7	0	0	7	14

=== Iowa ===
	1	2	3	4	Total
Hawkeyes	7	10	7	3	27
Scarlet Knights	3	0	0	7	10

=== At No. 3 Ohio State ===
	1	2	3	4	Total
Scarlet Knights	7	0	3	0	10
No. 3 Buckeyes	14	14	14	7	49

=== Nebraska ===
	1	2	3	4	Total
Cornhuskers	0	0	7	7	14
Scarlet Knights	10	3	0	0	13

=== Indiana ===
	1	2	3	4	Total
Hoosiers	14	0	0	3	17
Scarlet Knights	0	7	10	7	24

=== At Minnesota ===
	1	2	3	4	Total
Golden Gophers	0	14	0	17	31
Scarlet Knights	0	0	0	0	0

=== No. 5 Michigan ===
	1	2	3	4	Total
No. 5 Wolverines	14	0	28	10	52
Scarlet Knights	7	10	0	0	17

=== At Michigan State ===
	1	2	3	4	Total
Scarlet Knights	0	7	7	7	21
Spartans	7	7	7	6	27

=== No. 11 Penn State ===
	1	2	3	4	Total
No. 11 Nittany Lions	14	14	20	7	55
Scarlet Knights	10	0	0	0	10

=== At Maryland ===
	1	2	3	4	Total
Scarlet Knights	0	0	0	0	0
Terrapins	0	17	13	3	33

== Roster ==
2022 Rutgers Scarlet Knights football team roster
Players
Coaches
Offense

Pos.	#	Name	Class
QB	0	Noah Vedral	Sr
WR	1	Aron Cruickshank	Sr
QB	2	Gavin Wimsatt	So
QB	3	Evan Simon	So
RB	4	Aaron Young	Jr
WR	5	Sean Ryan	Sr
WR	6	Christian Dremel	Jr
WR	7	Shameen Jones	Sr
WR	9	Chris Long	So
TE	10	Matt Alaimo	Sr
WR	12	Joshua Youngblood	Jr
WR	13	Nasir Montgomery	So
WR	14	Isaiah Washington	Jr
WR	15	Max Patterson	So
QB	16	Raeden Oliver	Fr
QB	17	Gavin Rupp	So
WR	18	Rashad Rochelle	Fr
QB	19	Austin Albericci	Sr
TE	21	Johnny Langan	Sr
RB	23	Kyle Monangai	So
RB	26	Al-Shadee Salaam	So
RB	27	Samuel Brown V	Fr
WR	28	Fitzroy Ledgister	Fr
RB	32	Charlie Barth	Fr
RB	33	Parker Day	Sr
TE	40	Connor Hebbeler	Sr
RB	41	Jordan Kinsler	So
OL	50	C. J. Hanson	Jr
OL	51	Curtis Dunlap Jr.	Sr
OL	53	Mike Ciaffoni	Jr
OL	54	Nick Ciaffoni	Fr
OL	55	J. D. DiRenzo	Sr
OL	56	Tyler Needham	So
OL	57	Ireland Brown	Jr
OL	58	David Nwaogwugwu	Sr
OL	59	Gus Zilinskas	So
OL	60	Moses Gbagbe-Sowah	So
OL	61	Emir Stinette	Fr
OL	62	Brad Harris Jr.	Fr
OL	63	Taj White	Fr
OL	64	Nelson Monegro	Fr
OL	65	Bryan Felter	So
OL	66	Joe De Croce	Fr
OL	69	Kwabena Asamoah	Fr
OL	70	Reggie Sutton	Sr
OL	71	Kamar Missouri	So
OL	72	Hollin Pierce	So
OL	73	Terrence Salami	So
OL	74	Jacob Allen	Fr
OL	75	Beau Lanzidelle	So
OL	76	Dantae Chin	Fr
OL	77	Willie Tyler III	Sr
WR	81	Jordan Smikle	Fr
TE	82	Jordan Walker	Fr
TE	86	Evan Ward	So
TE	88	Mike Higgins	Fr
TE	89	Victor Konopka	So

Defense

Pos.	#	Name	Class
DB	0	Christian Izien	Sr
DB	2	Avery Young	Sr
LB	3	Moses Walker	Fr
DB	4	Desmond Igbinosun	So
DB	5	Keesawn Abraham	Sr
DB	6	Christian Braswell	Sr
DB	7	Robert Longerbeam	So
DL	8	Mohamed Toure	Jr
LB	8	Jamier Wright-Collins	So
LB	9	Khayri Banton	So
DL	10	Shawn Collins	So
DL	11	Cam'Ron Stewart	So
DL	12	Kenny Fletcher	Fr
DL	13	Q'yaeir Price	Fr
DL	14	Jordan Thompson	So
DB	15	Zilan Williams	Fr
DB	16	Max Melton	So
LB	17	Deion Jennings	Sr
DB	18	Keenan Reid	Sr
DB	19	Todd Bowles Jr.	So
DB	20	Elijuwan Mack	So
DB	21	Carnell Davis	So
LB	22	Tyreem Powell	So
DL	23	Wesley Bailey	So
DB	24	Thomas Amankwaa	Fr
DB	25	Shaquan Loyal	So
DB	26	Damon Matthews	Jr
DB	27	Timmy Ward	So
DB	29	Amir Byrd	Jr
LB	30	Sam Gadie	Fr
DB	31	Michael Robinson II	So
DB	32	Rani Abdulaziz	Sr
LB	33	Andrew Vince	So
LB	34	Micah Wing	Fr
LB	35	David Onuoha	Fr
LB	36	Dominick Williams	Sr
DB	37	Joe Lusardi	So
LB	38	Austin Dean	So
DB	40	Sebastian Jusma	Fr
LB	41	Ryan Russo	Fr
DL	42	DJ Allen	Fr
DB	43	Andrew Vargas	Fr
LB	45	Dami Awoyinfa	So
DB	46	Kareem Lewis	Fr
DL	48	Kyonte Hamilton	So
DL	50	Jordany Augustin	Fr
DL	51	Troy Rainey	So
LB	54	Timmy Hinspeter	Fr
DL	55	Zaire Angoy	So
DL	56	Sean Cooper	So
DL	57	Stanley Dennis II	So
LB	58	Dariel Djabome	Fr
DL	69	Caleb Patterson	So
DL	71	Aaron Lewis	So
DL	80	Jahzion Harris	So
DL	88	Ifeanyi Maijeh	Sr
DL	90	René Konga	So
DL	92	Mayan Ahanotu	Sr
DL	95	Henry Hughes Jr.	So
DL	96	Keshon Griffin	So

Special teams

Pos.	#	Name	Class
K	44	Jai Patel	Fr
LS	45	Ed Rogowski	Sr
LS	46	Sammy El Hadidi	Fr
K	48	Antonio Chadha	Fr
LS	49	Zack Taylor	So
K	93	Jude McAtamney	Jr
P	94	Adam Korsak	Sr
P	95	Flynn Appleby	Fr
K	96	Guy Fava	Jr
K	99	Michael O'Connor	So

Head coach

- Greg Schiano

Coordinators/assistant coaches

- Sean Gleeson (offensive coordinator/quarterbacks)
- Joe Harasymiak (defensive coordinator)
- Mark Orphey (cornerbacks)
- Corey Hetherman (linebackers)
- Drew Lascari (safeties)
- Marquise Watson (defensive line)
- Andrew Aurich (running backs)
- Nunzio Campanile (tight ends)
- Damiere Shaw (wide receivers)
- Augie Hoffmann (offensive line)
- Eddie Allen (special teams assistant)

Legend

- (C) Team captain
- (S) Suspended
- (I) Ineligible
- Injured
- Redshirt

Roster
Last update: November 2, 2020
