= Malcolm Bell (Canadian football) =

Canadian gridiron football player (born 2002)

No. 12 – Saskatchewan Roughriders
- Position: Defensive back
- Roster status: Active
- CFL status: National

Personal information
- Born: January 12, 2002 (age 24); Montreal, Quebec, Canada
- Listed height: 6 ft 2 in (1.88 m)
- Listed weight: 190 lb (86 kg)

Career information
- High school: Collège Sainte-Anne (Lachine, Quebec); Clarkson (Mississauga, Ontario)
- College: UConn (2021–2024); Michigan State (2025)
- NFL draft: 2026: undrafted
- CFL draft: 2026: 1st round, 9th overall pick

Career history
- Saskatchewan Roughriders (2026–present)
- Stats at CFL.ca

Malcolm Bell (born January 12, 2002) is a Canadian professional football defensive back who plays for the Saskatchewan Roughriders of the Canadian Football League (CFL). He played college football for the UConn Huskies and Michigan State Spartans.

== Early life ==
Bell was born on January 12, 2002, in Montreal, Quebec, Canada. He attended Collège Sainte-Anne in Lachine, Quebec and Clarkson Secondary School in Mississauga, Ontario.

== College career ==
Bell played college football for the UConn Huskies from 2021 to 2024 and Michigan State Spartans in 2025. In 33 games, he had 93 tackles, including four for loss, 13 pass break ups, one forced fumble and fumble recovery. Bell transferred to Michigan State University for the 2025 season. He had 49 tackles, one sack, and six pass deflections in 12 games as senior.

== Professional career ==
Pre-draft measurables
Height	Weight	Arm length	Hand span	Wingspan	40-yard dash	10-yard split	20-yard split	20-yard shuttle	Three-cone drill	Vertical jump	Broad jump	Bench press
6 ft 1 in (1.85 m)	191 lb (87 kg)	33 in (0.84 m)	9 1/2 in (0.24 m)	6 ft 5 1/4 in (1.96 m)	4.60 s	1.61 s	2.70 s	4.56 s	7.10 s	33.5 in (0.85 m)	10 ft 1 in (3.07 m)	12 reps
All values from Pro day

Bell was selected in the first round, with the 9th overall selection, by the Saskatchewan Roughriders in the 2026 CFL draft. On May 13, he officially signed with the team. Bell made the initial roster and played in his first CFL game on June 13, against the BC Lions.
