= Darius McKenzie =

Canadian gridiron football player (born 2002)

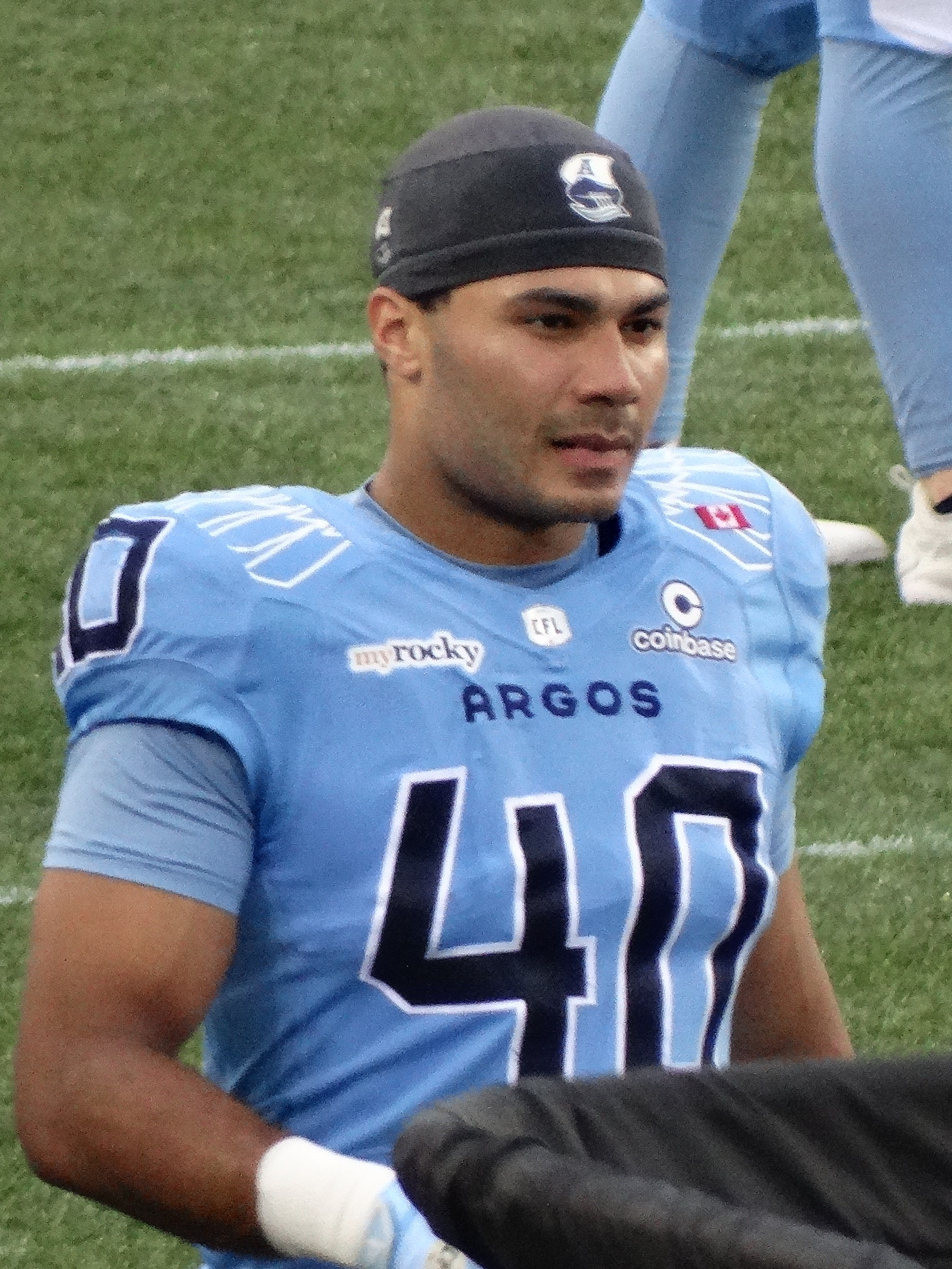
- McKenzie with the Toronto Argonauts in 2026

No. 40 – Toronto Argonauts
- Position: Linebacker
- Roster status: Active
- CFL status: National

Personal information
- Born: April 7, 2002 (age 24); Ottawa, Ontario, Canada
- Listed height: 6 ft 1 in (1.85 m)
- Listed weight: 224 lb (102 kg)

Career information
- High school: Clearwater Academy International; St. Patrick's High
- College: Maine (2021–2023); South Alabama (2024–2025)
- CFL draft: 2026: 3rd round, 23rd overall pick

Career history
- 2026–present: Toronto Argonauts
- Stats at CFL.ca

Darius McKenzie (born April 7, 2002) is a Canadian professional football linebacker for the Toronto Argonauts of the Canadian Football League (CFL).

== University career ==
McKenzie first played college football for the Maine Black Bears from 2021 to 2023. He played in 15 games where he had 51 tackles, five tackles for loss, two sacks, one forced fumble, and two pass knockdowns. He then transferred to the University of South Alabama where he played for the Jaguars from 2024 to 2025. In two seasons with the Jaguars, he played in 24 games where he had 143 tackles, 7.5 tackles for loss, 1.5 sacks, one fumble recovery, and five pass knockdowns.

== Professional career ==
McKenzie was selected by the Toronto Argonauts in the third round, 23rd overall, in the 2026 CFL draft and signed with the team on May 5, 2026. He made the active roster following training camp and played in his first CFL game on June 12, 2026, against the Montreal Alouettes where he recorded one special teams tackle.

== Personal ==
McKenzie was born to parents Ralston McKenzie and Tracy Stevenson.
