= Ray Guy Award =

American college football award

- Awarded for: College football's top punter
- Country: United States
- Presented by: Greater Augusta Sports Council

History
- First award: 2000
- Most recent: Brett Thorson, Georgia
- Website: http://www.augustasportscouncil.org/

The Ray Guy Award is presented annually to college football's most outstanding punter as adjudged by the Augusta Sports Council. The award is named after punter Ray Guy, an All-American for Southern Mississippi and an All-Pro in the National Football League for the Oakland Raiders. The Ray Guy Award winner is determined by a national selection committee of football writers, FBS college coaches, sports information directors, and past Ray Guy Award winners.

Selection Criteria

Ahead of the award's establishment in 2000, Ray Guy and kicking coach Rick Sang helped develop the statistical evaluation criteria used to select finalists. Rather than evaluating punters solely on gross punting average, the criteria incorporate situational metrics including net punting average, total number and percentage of punts downed inside the 20-yard line, average return yardage allowed, and the percentage of punts not returned.

== Winners ==
Year	Winner	School	Ref
2000	Kevin Stemke	Wisconsin	
2001	Travis Dorsch	Purdue	
2002	Mark Mariscal	Colorado	
2003	B. J. Sander	Ohio State	
2004	Daniel Sepulveda	Baylor	
2005	Ryan Plackemeier	Wake Forest	
2006	Daniel Sepulveda (2)	Baylor (2)	
2007	Durant Brooks	Georgia Tech	
2008	Matt Fodge	Oklahoma State	
2009	Drew Butler	Georgia	
2010	Chas Henry	Florida	
2011	Ryan Allen	Louisiana Tech	
2012	Ryan Allen (2)	Louisiana Tech (2)	
2013	Tom Hornsey	Memphis	
2014	Tom Hackett	Utah	
2015	Tom Hackett (2)	Utah (2)	
2016	Mitch Wishnowsky	Utah (3)	
2017	Michael Dickson	Texas	
2018	Braden Mann	Texas A&M	
2019	Max Duffy	Kentucky	
2020	Pressley Harvin III	Georgia Tech (2)	
2021	Matt Araiza	San Diego State	
2022	Adam Korsak	Rutgers	
2023	Tory Taylor	Iowa	
2024	Eddie Czaplicki	USC	
2025	Brett Thorson	Georgia (2)	

== FCS Punter of the Year ==
FCS Punter of the Year Award was created in 2019 to honor FCS punters with leadership qualities as well as outstanding statistics.

Winners
Season	Player	School
2019	Alex Pechin	Bucknell
2020	D. J. Arnson	Northern Arizona
2021	Brian Buschini	Montana
2022	Patrick Rohrbach	Montana
2023	Aidan Laros	UT Martin
2024	Brendon Kilpatrick	Youngstown State
2025	James Platte	The Citadel

== General references ==
- "Ray Guy Award Winners". Sports Reference.
