= Devynn Cromwell =

Canadian gridiron football player (born 2001)

No. 23 – Hamilton Tiger-Cats
- Position: Defensive back
- Roster status: Active
- CFL status: National

Personal information
- Born: November 29, 2001 (age 24); Toronto, Ontario, Canada
- Listed height: 5 ft 11 in (1.80 m)
- Listed weight: 200 lb (91 kg)

Career information
- High school: Clarkson (Mississauga, Ontario)
- College: Texas Tech (2024); Michigan State (2025)
- University: Guelph (2020–2023)
- CFL draft: 2026: 3rd round, 25th overall pick

Career history
- Hamilton Tiger-Cats (2026–present)

Awards and highlights
- Second-team All-Canadian (2021); Second-team OUA All-Star (2023)
- Stats at CFL.ca

Devynn Cromwell (born November 29, 2001) is a Canadian professional football defensive back for the Hamilton Tiger-Cats of the Canadian Football League (CFL). He played U Sports football for the Guelph Gryphons and college football for the Texas Tech Red Raiders and Michigan State Spartans.

== U Sports and college career ==
Cromwell played U Sports football for the Guelph Gryphons from 2020 to 2023 and college football for the Texas Tech Red Raiders in 2024 and Michigan State Spartans in 2025. At Guelph, he had 29 tackles, including 2.5 for loss, two interceptions, seven pass breakups, one forced fumble, and one fumble recovery.

On December 13, 2023, Cromwell transferred to Texas Tech University. He played in nine games, starting two, where he made 20 tackles. On April 17, 2025, Cromwell entered the transfer portal.

On May 13, Cromwell committed to Michigan State University. He saw action in 12 games, starting one and made eight tackles.

== Professional career ==
Pre-draft measurables
Height	Weight	Arm length	Hand span	Wingspan	Vertical jump	Broad jump	Bench press
6 ft 0 in (1.83 m)	200 lb (91 kg)	30 3/4 in (0.78 m)	8 5/8 in (0.22 m)	6 ft 3 1/8 in (1.91 m)	40 1/2 in (1.03 m)	11 ft 3 in (3.43 m)	18 reps
All values from Pro Day

Cromwell was selected by the Hamilton Tiger-Cats with the 25th overall pick in the third round of the 2026 CFL draft. On June 3, he was placed on the six-game injured list, recovering from a torn meniscus he suffered at his Pro Day in March. On September 6, Cromwell was promoted to the active roster and made his CFL debut the following day.
