= Albert Reese =

Canadian gridiron football player (born 2002)

No. 76 – Carolina Panthers
- Position: Tackle
- Roster status: Practice squad

Personal information
- Born: August 13, 2002 (age 24); Edmonton, Alberta, Canada
- Listed height: 6 ft 7 in (2.01 m)
- Listed weight: 325 lb (147 kg)

Career information
- High school: Clearwater (Clearwater, Florida)
- College: Mississippi State (2021–2025)
- NFL draft: 2026: undrafted
- CFL draft: 2026: 6th round, 56th overall pick

Career history
- Carolina Panthers (2026); Arizona Cardinals (2026); Carolina Panthers (2026–present)*
- * Offseason or practice squad member only

Awards and highlights
- Kent Hull Trophy (2024)
- Stats at Pro Football Reference

Albert Waldo Reese IV (born August 13, 2002) is a Canadian professional football tackle for the Carolina Panthers of the National Football League (NFL). He played college football for the Mississippi State Bulldogs.

== Early life ==
Reese was born August 13, 2002 in Edmonton, Alberta, Canada. He attended Strathcona High School and Harry Ainlay High School in Canada before moving to the United States to attend Clearwater Academy International in Clearwater, Florida, after being encouraged to play high school football for the school by his friend and fellow Canadian football player, Ajou Ajou. Reese was three-star recruit according to ESPN, Rivals.com, and 247Sports. Thirty NCAA Division I sent offers to Reese to play college football; after initially committing to the Rutgers Scarlet Knights, he decommited from Rutgers and committed to the Mississippi State Bulldogs.

== College career ==
Playing for the Mississippi State Bulldogs, Reese took a redshirt in 2021 after playing in three games. In 2022, he played in 13 games, with one start against the Illinois Fighting Illini. He played in all 12 games in 2023, allowing zero sacks and two pressures in 79 plays; he also contributed on special teams.

In 2024, Reese started in all 12 games. Playing primarily at right tackle, he also took snaps at left tackle, right guard, and left guard. He earned the Kent Hull Trophy in 2024, awarded to Mississippi's best college offensive lineman.

Reese started in nine games in 2025, allowing four sacks and committing four penalties in 650 plays at three different positions on the offensive line.

== Professional career ==
Pre-draft measurables
Height	Weight	Arm length	Hand span	Wingspan	40-yard dash	10-yard split	20-yard split	20-yard shuttle	Three-cone drill	Vertical jump	Broad jump	Bench press
6 ft 6 3/4 in (2.00 m)	330 lb (150 kg)	34 7/8 in (0.89 m)	10 1/4 in (0.26 m)	7 ft 0 1/4 in (2.14 m)	5.24 s	1.90 s	2.97 s	4.95 s	8.08 s	28.0 in (0.71 m)	8 ft 9 in (2.67 m)	29 reps
All values from Pro Day

Reese was selected in the sixth round (56th overall) by the Saskatchewan Roughriders in the 2026 CFL draft.

=== Carolina Panthers ===
After going unselected in the 2026 NFL draft, Reese was signed by the Carolina Panthers as an undrafted free agent. He made the Panthers initial 53-man roster, however after being inactive the first five games, he was waived on October 20, 2026.

=== Arizona Cardinals ===
On October 21, 2026, Reese was claimed off waivers by the Arizona Cardinals. On November 17, he was released.

=== Carolina Panthers (second stint) ===
On November 19, 2026, Reese signed with the Carolina Panthers practice squad.

== Personal life ==
Reese's father, Albert Reese III, also played football. He appeared in 84 games for the Edmonton Eskimos of the Canadian Football League (CFL) and was a member of the NFL's San Francisco 49ers in 1997.
