= Giordano Vaccaro =

Canadian gridiron football player (born 2003)

No. 68 – Ottawa Redblacks
- Position: Offensive lineman
- Roster status: Active
- CFL status: National

Personal information
- Born: August 26, 2003 (age 23); Winnipeg, Manitoba, Canada
- Listed height: 6 ft 2 in (1.88 m)
- Listed weight: 306 lb (139 kg)

Career information
- High school: Clearwater Academy; St. Paul's High
- University: Manitoba (2022–2024); Purdue (2025)
- CFL draft: 2026: 1st round, 1st overall pick

Career history
- 2026–present: Ottawa Redblacks

Awards and highlights
- J. P. Metras Trophy (2024); 2× First-team All-Canadian (2023, 2024)
- Stats at CFL.ca

Giordano Vaccaro (born August 26, 2003) is a Canadian professional football offensive lineman for the Ottawa Redblacks of the Canadian Football League (CFL). He was the first overall pick in the 2026 CFL draft.

== University career ==
Vaccaro first played U Sports football for the Manitoba Bisons from 2022 to 2024. In his rookie season in 2022, he started all eight regular season games and one playoff game at left tackle. In the 2023 season, he again started nine games, this time at left guard, and was named a U Sports First Team All-Canadian. Vaccaro played and started in nine games at left guard in 2024 where he was again named a U Sports First Team All-Canadian and was also awarded the J. P. Metras Trophy at season's end.

Vaccaro transferred to Purdue University for the 2025 season to play for the Boilermakers. He played in 12 games as a backup offensive lineman and special teams player.

== Professional career ==
Pre-draft measurables
Height	Weight	Arm length	Hand span	Wingspan	40-yard dash	10-yard split	20-yard split	20-yard shuttle	Three-cone drill	Vertical jump	Broad jump	Bench press
6 ft 2 in (1.88 m)	307 lb (139 kg)	31 in (0.79 m)	9 5/8 in (0.24 m)	6 ft 6 1/4 in (1.99 m)	5.41 s	1.95 s	3.10 s	4.82 s	7.84 s	29.0 in (0.74 m)	8 ft 8 in (2.64 m)	28 reps
All values from Pro Day

Vaccaro was ranked as the 11th best player in the Canadian Football League's Amateur Scouting Bureau final rankings for players eligible in the 2026 CFL draft. He was then drafted with the first overall pick by the Ottawa Redblacks. He signed with the Redblacks to a three-year rookie contract on April 29, 2026.
