= Matt Kudu =

Player of American and Canadian football

Profile
- Position: Defensive tackle

Personal information
- Born: Toronto, Ontario, Canada
- Listed height: 6 ft 3 in (1.91 m)
- Listed weight: 277 lb (126 kg)

Career information
- College: Eastern Michigan
- CFL draft: 2005: 3rd round, 21st overall pick

Career history
- 2006: Toronto Argonauts
- 2007–2008: Winnipeg Blue Bombers
- Stats at CFL.ca (archive)

Matt Kudu is a Canadian former professional football player, who played for the Winnipeg Blue Bombers and Toronto Argonauts.

== Early life ==
Kudu, born in Toronto and grew up in Mississauga, Ontario, attended Clarkson Secondary School and transferred to Lorne Park Secondary School where he won a Metro Bowl Championship as a senior in 2001. He was twice named Toronto Star All-Star and Toronto Sun All-Star while in high school. He also played in the Ontario Varsity Football League with the Mississauga Warriors and was an all-star lineman winning one OVFL Championship. He was inducted into the OVFL Hall of Fame in 2006.

Kudu studied at Eastern Michigan University and is pursuing his teaching certificate. He played in at least 11 out of 12 games all four years for the Eastern Michigan Eagles, was named Defensive player of the week three times, and named the Top-Conditioned Athlete at Eastern Michigan as a senior in 2004.

== Professional career ==
Kudu attended the CFL Evaluation Camp in 2005 and was drafted by the Saskatchewan Roughriders and spent the season on the practice roster. In April, 2006, Toronto Argonauts signed Kudu as a free agent and dressed for the first seven games of the 2006 CFL season recording five defensive tackles and two quarterback sacks before finishing the year on the injured reserve list with a knee injury. He played in both 2007 pre-season games for Toronto but was released before the regular season.

The Winnipeg Blue Bombers signed Kudu as a free agent on October 23, 2007, and re-signed him February 5, 2008. Kudu was released by the Bombers on March 16, 2009.
