= Benjamin Sangmuah =

Canadian-Ghanaian gridiron football player (born 2003)

No. 16 – Edmonton Elks
- Position: Defensive back
- Roster status: Active
- CFL status: National

Personal information
- Born: May 30, 2003 (age 23); Takoradi, Ghana
- Listed height: 6 ft 3 in (1.91 m)
- Listed weight: 205 lb (93 kg)

Career information
- High school: Clarkson (Mississauga, Ontario)
- University: UBC (2022–2025)
- CFL draft: 2026: 2nd round, 12th overall pick

Career history
- Edmonton Elks (2026–present)

Awards and highlights
- Grey Cup champion (2026)
- Stats at CFL.ca

Benjamin Sangmuah (born May 30, 2003) is a Canadian-Ghanaian professional football defensive back for the Edmonton Elks of the Canadian Football League (CFL). He played U Sports football for the UBC Thunderbirds.

== Early life ==
Sangmuah was born on May 30, 2003, in Takoradi, Ghana, and grew up in Scarborough, Ontario, Canada. He attended Clarkson Secondary School in Mississauga, Ontario.

== University career ==
Sangmuah played U Sports football for the UBC Thunderbirds from 2022 to 2025. In 41 games, he had 162 tackles, including 7.5 for loss, 2.5 sacks, five interceptions, 29 pass break ups, five forced fumbles and three fumble recoveries.

== Professional career ==
Pre-draft measurables
Height	Weight	Arm length	Hand span	40-yard dash	10-yard split	20-yard split	20-yard shuttle	Vertical jump	Broad jump	Bench press
6 ft 1 in (1.85 m)	194 lb (88 kg)	31 3/8 in (0.80 m)	9 1/2 in (0.24 m)	4.46 s	1.57 s	2.50 s	4.27 s	37 in (0.94 m)	10 ft 9 in (3.28 m)	13 reps
All values from Pro Day

Sangmuah was selected by the Edmonton Elks with the 12th overall pick in the second round of the 2026 CFL draft. On May 11, he officially signed with the team. On June 3, Sangmuah was placed on the six-game injured list with a knee injury. On September 25, he was elevated to the active roster and made his debut the following day against the Hamilton Tiger-Cats.
