= Albert Reese (gridiron football) =

American football player (born 1973)

No. 71, 95, 99, 96
- Positions: Defensive tackle, Defensive end

Personal information
- Born: April 29, 1973 (age 53); Mobile, Alabama, U.S.
- Listed height: 6 ft 6 in (1.98 m)
- Listed weight: 275 lb (125 kg)

Career information
- High school: C. F. Vigor (Prichard, Alabama)
- College: Grambling State (1992–1995)
- NFL draft: 1996: undrafted

Career history
- San Francisco 49ers (1996–1998); Cleveland Browns (1999)*; Edmonton Eskimos (2000–2002); Grand Rapids Rampage (2003); Edmonton Eskimos (2003–2004); Dallas Desperados (2005); Grand Rapids Rampage (2006)*
- * Offseason or practice squad member only

Awards and highlights
- Grey Cup champion (2003); Black college football national champion (1992); 2× First-team All-SWAC (1993, 1994); Second-team All-SWAC (1995)

Career NFL statistics
- Games played: 6
- Tackles: 1
- Stats at Pro Football Reference

Career CFL statistics
- Games played: 84
- Tackles: 155
- Sacks: 17
- Pass deflections: 8
- Forced fumbles: 1
- Fumble recoveries: 1
- Stats at CFL.ca
- Stats at ArenaFan.com

Albert A. Reese III (born April 29, 1973) is an American former professional football defensive tackle and defensive end who played for the San Francisco 49ers of the National Football League (NFL) and the Edmonton Eskimos of the Canadian Football League (CFL). He played college football for the Grambling State Tigers.

== Early life ==
Reese was born on April 29, 1973, in Mobile, Alabama. He attended C. F. Vigor High School in Prichard, Alabama. On February 5, 1992, Reese signed a National Letter of Intent to play college football at Grambling State University.

== College career ==
Reese played college football for the Grambling State Tigers from 1992 to 1995. He was twice named first-team All-Southwestern Athletic Conference, doing so in 1993 and 1994. As a senior, Reese earned second-team honors. He played in the 1995 Blue–Gray Football Classic.

== Professional career ==
=== San Francisco 49ers ===
After going unselected in the 1996 NFL draft, Reese signed with the San Francisco 49ers as an undrafted free agent. On August 20, he was waived. On August 26, Reese was signed to the practice squad. On August 24, 1997, he was released again and re-signed to the practice squad. On October 21, Reese was waived by the team. On November 5, he was signed to the active roster by the 49ers. Reese played in six games, recording one tackle in the Divisional game against the Minnesota Vikings. On August 30, 1998, he was released by the team.

=== Cleveland Browns ===
On February 11, 1999, Reese was signed by the Cleveland Browns. On August 25, he was waived by the team.

=== Edmonton Eskimos (first stint) ===
On March 2, 2000, Reese was signed by the Edmonton Eskimos of the Canadian Football League (CFL). In his first season, he had 37 tackles, three sacks and two pass deflections. In 2001, Reese made 36 tackles, one sack, two pass break ups, one forced fumble and one fumble recovery. The next season, he registered 31 tackles and nine sacks, which was the second-highest total in the CFL. On December 20, 2002, Reese became a free agent.

=== Grand Rapids Rampage (first stint) ===
In 2003, Reese played for the Grand Rapids Rampage of the Arena Football League (AFL). In 12 games, he logged 21 tackles, two sacks and one forced fumble.

=== Edmonton Eskimos (second stint) ===
On June 11, 2003, Reese was re-signed by the Eskimos. He recorded 25 tackles and two sacks in 16 games as the team won the 91st Grey Cup over the Montreal Alouettes. In 2004, Reese tallied 26 tackles and two sacks in 15 games. He became a free agent at the end of the season.

=== Dallas Desperados ===
On January 5, 2005, Reese was signed by the Dallas Desperados of the AFL. He played in two games, recording two tackles before he became a free agent.

=== Grand Rapids Rampage (second stint) ===
On November 3, 2005, Reese was re-signed by the Rampage. On December 6, he was waived by the team.

== Personal life ==
Reese's son, Albert Reese IV, plays for the Arizona Cardinals at tackle.
