= Brady Lidster =

Canadian gridiron football player (born 2004)

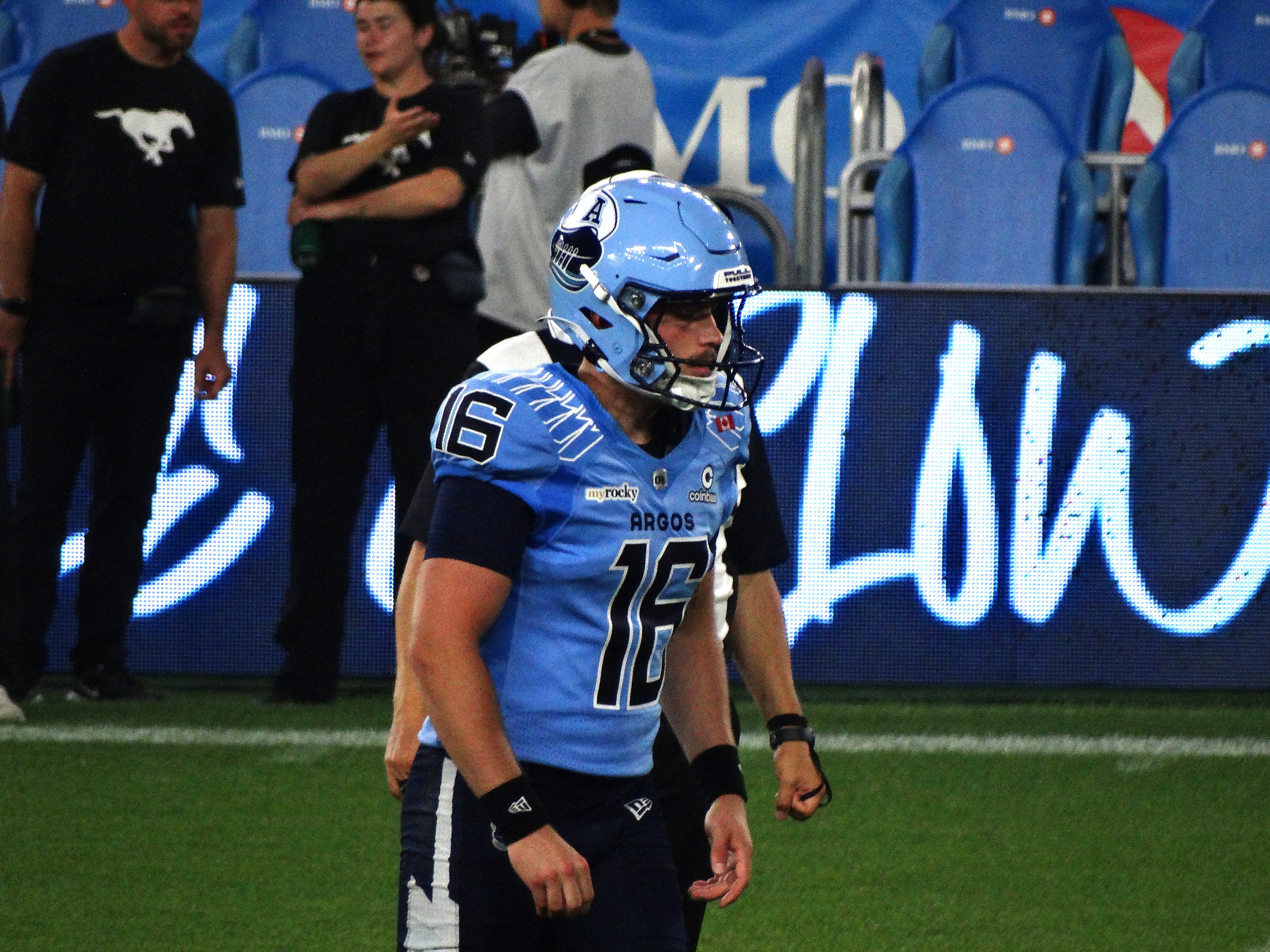
- Lidster with the Toronto Argonauts in 2026

Profile
- Position: Placekicker

Personal information
- Born: December 15, 2004 (age 21); St. Thomas, Ontario, Canada
- Listed height: 5 ft 11 in (1.80 m)
- Listed weight: 188 lb (85 kg)

Career information
- High school: Parkside Collegiate
- University: Windsor
- CFL draft: 2026: 8th round, 69th overall pick

Career history
- 2026: Winnipeg Blue Bombers*
- 2026: Toronto Argonauts
- * Offseason or practice squad member only

Awards and highlights
- First-team All-Canadian (2025)
- Stats at CFL.ca

Brady Lidster (born December 15, 2004) is a Canadian professional football placekicker. He most recently played for the Toronto Argonauts of the Canadian Football League (CFL).

== University career ==
Lidster played U Sports football for the Windsor Lancers. During his U Sports career, he played in 38 games and was named a First-team All-Canadian in 2025.

== Professional career ==
=== Winnipeg Blue Bombers ===
Lidster was selected by the Winnipeg Blue Bombers in the eighth round, 69th overall, in the 2026 CFL draft and signed with the team on April 30, 2026. He spent training camp with the team but was released on June 1, 2026.

=== Toronto Argonauts ===
Lidster was signed by the Toronto Argonauts on July 15, 2026. He soon after made his professional debut on July 25, 2026, against the BC Lions, where he connected on four of five field goal attempts and made both convert attempts. He played in five games where he made 15 of 21 field goal attempts and eight of 12 conversion attempts. He was released on September 2, 2026.
