= Mapalo Mwansa =

English American football player (born 2004/05)

No. 42 – Carolina Panthers
- Position: Linebacker
- Roster status: Practice squad

Personal information
- Born: April 2, 2004 (age 22); Peterborough, England
- Listed height: 6 ft 2 in (1.88 m)
- Listed weight: 234 lb (106 kg)

Career information
- College: Loughborough
- NFL draft: 2025: undrafted
- CFL draft: 2026G: 1st round, 9th overall pick

Career history
- Nottingham Caesars (2024); Carolina Panthers (2025–present)*
- * Offseason or practice squad member only
- Stats at Pro Football Reference

Mapalo Mwansa (born April 2, 2004) is a British American football linebacker for the Carolina Panthers of the National Football League (NFL). He came through the NFL's International Player Pathway (IPP) program for 2025.

== Career ==
Mwansa grew up playing a lot of different sports and began powerlifting while at Loughborough University. He was scouted by a local football coach and took a "crash course" in the sport involving Netflix series Last Chance U and Quarterback, soon joined the school's BUAFL program and the Great Britain national team as a defensive end and linebacker, as well as playing for Nottingham Caesars of the BAFA National Leagues. Mwansa was part of the Great Britain Men's national team for the IFAF European Championship qualifiers in October 2024. He was named as part of the NFL's International Player Pathway in December 2024.

On April 28, 2025, Mwansa signed with the Carolina Panthers. He was waived on August 26, and re-signed to the practice squad. He signed a reserve/future contract on January 12, 2026.

He was drafted in the first round (ninth overall) by the Saskatchewan Roughriders in the 2026 CFL global draft.

On August 30, 2026, Mwansa was waived as part of final roster cuts and signed to the practice squad the next day.

== Personal life ==
Mwansa is an English native of Zambian descent. He grew up in Peterborough, England, and studied economics at Loughborough University. Mwansa ran 10.4 seconds for the 100 metres, and a 4.45-second 40-yard dash time.
