= Wesley Bailey (American football) =

21st century Canadian football player

No. 47 – Los Angeles Rams
- Position: Outside linebacker
- Roster status: Active

Personal information
- Born: April 26, 2001 (age 25); Ottawa, Ontario, Canada
- Listed height: 6 ft 5 in (1.96 m)
- Listed weight: 265 lb (120 kg)

Career information
- High school: Clearwater International (Clearwater, Florida, U.S.)
- College: Rutgers (2020–2024); Louisville (2025)
- NFL draft: 2026: undrafted
- CFL draft: 2026: 2nd round, 19th overall pick

Career history
- Los Angeles Rams (2026–present)

Career NFL statistics as of Week 10, 2026
- Total tackles: 16
- Sacks: 2.0
- Forced fumbles: 2
- Pass deflections: 2
- Interceptions: 1
- Stats at Pro Football Reference

Wesley Bailey (born April 26, 2001) is a Canadian professional football outside linebacker for the Los Angeles Rams of the National Football League (NFL). He played college football for the Rutgers Scarlet Knights and Louisville Cardinals.

== Early life ==
Bailey was born on April 26, 2001, in Ottawa, Ontario, Canada, growing up in the Ottawa community of Orleans. His mother was an immigrant from Jamaica and he has three sisters. His mother was killed while visiting Jamaica when Bailey was age five, and he afterwards was raised along with his twin sister by his uncle, before later moving in with a different uncle. He grew up playing football and began playing as a defensive end in 2019. He soon after decided to attend Clearwater Academy International in Florida. During the 2019 season there, Bailey posted 62 tackles and seven sacks. A three-star recruit, he initially committed to play college football for the Minnesota Golden Gophers before flipping to the Rutgers Scarlet Knights.

== College career ==
Bailey saw no playing time as a true freshman at Rutgers in 2020, then appeared in seven games while recording six tackles and a sack in 2021. In 2022, he started all 12 games at defensive end and led the team with 3.5 sacks while also recording 30 tackles. The following year, Bailey recorded 27 tackles, 4.5 tackles-for-loss (TFLs) and four sacks. Due to injuries, he only made four appearances during the 2024 season and took a redshirt. Bailey then transferred to the Louisville Cardinals for his final season of college football in 2025, totaling 39 tackles, seven TFLs and six sacks while starting 12 games. At Louisville, he played alongside his childhood friend Rene Konga. In his collegiate career, Bailey recorded 110 tackles, 22 TFLs and 15.5 sacks.

== Professional career ==
Pre-draft measurables
Height	Weight	Arm length	Hand span	Wingspan	40-yard dash	10-yard split	20-yard split	20-yard shuttle	Three-cone drill	Vertical jump	Broad jump	Bench press
6 ft 4 3/4 in (1.95 m)	260 lb (118 kg)	34 1/4 in (0.87 m)	9 1/2 in (0.24 m)	6 ft 9 3/4 in (2.08 m)	4.69 s	1.53 s	2.68 s	4.50 s	7.00 s	35.0 in (0.89 m)	10 ft 1 in (3.07 m)	27 reps
All values from Pro Day

After going unselected in the 2026 NFL draft, Bailey signed with the Los Angeles Rams as an undrafted free agent. He was also selected by the Edmonton Elks in the second round (19th overall) of the 2026 CFL draft.

== Externel links ==
- Career statistics from NFL.com · ESPN · CBS Sports · Yahoo Sports
- Los Angeles Rams bio
- Louisville Cardinals bio
- Rutgers Scarlet Knights bio
