= Barbara Turnbull =

Canadian journalist and activist (1965 – 2015)

- Born: Barbara Sue Turnbull; February 7, 1965; Montreal, Quebec, Canada
- Died: May 10, 2015 (aged 50); Toronto, Ontario, Canada
- Occupation: News reporter
- Known for: Advocacy for physically disabled people

Barbara Sue Turnbull (February 7, 1965 – May 10, 2015) was a Canadian quadriplegic news reporter and activist for those with physical disabilities. She grew up in Mississauga, Ontario.

== Shooting ==
Late in the evening of September 23, 1983 Turnbull, then an 18-year-old-student at Clarkson Secondary School, was working at her part-time job at a convenience store when four men (Hugh Logan, Sutcliffe Logan, Warren Johnson, and Clive Brown) robbed the establishment. Although she complied with their demands, Hugh Logan shot Turnbull in the throat with a .357 Magnum severing her spine, leaving Turnbull paralyzed from the neck down. All four men were arrested, convicted of attempted murder and other offences, and sent to prison.

Two of the offenders had their sentences reduced to armed robbery in 1986. All four were later deported to their native Jamaica. In Season 4 Episode 5 of the TV series Exhibit A: Secrets of Forensic Science, Turnbull tells her story in her own words.

== Education ==
In spite of the life-changing tragedy, Turnbull went on to journalism school in the Arizona State University, from 1987 to 1990, where she was the valedictorian of her graduating class.

The trial of her shooters was dramatized in the 1991 debut episode of the CBC Television docudrama series Scales of Justice, in which Turnbull appeared as herself despite virtually all other roles being played by actors.

== Journalism career ==
Upon returning home to Toronto, Turnbull was hired by the Toronto Star as a reporter for the Life section of their newspaper. She would write articles about other people with disabilities that were similar to her own, as well as research into spinal cord injury.

== Challenge To Famous Player Theatres ==
In 1993, she made a complaint with the Ontario Human Rights Commission over lack of accessibility in cinemas operated by Famous Players Theatres; in 2001, the commission ruled in her favour; however, two cinemas were closed instead of being made fully accessible.

== Illness and death ==
On Sunday, May 10, 2015, Turnbull died from complications with pneumonia, at age 50. Her funeral was held at Cathedral Church of St. James (Toronto). She is buried at Mount Pleasant Cemetery, Toronto.

== Order of Canada ==
On Canada Day, July 1, 2015, Turnbull was posthumously called to the Order of Canada, for her journalism and for her dedication to helping to improve the lives of those with quadriplegia.
