= Nolan Ulm =

Canadian gridiron football player (born 2002)

- Ulm with the Toronto Argonauts in 2026

No. 17 – Toronto Argonauts
- Position: Wide receiver
- Roster status: Active
- CFL status: National

Personal information
- Born: January 17, 2002 (age 24); Edmonton, Alberta, Canada
- Listed height: 6 ft 2 in (1.88 m)
- Listed weight: 205 lb (93 kg)

Career information
- High school: Kelowna (Kelowna, British Columbia)
- College: Eastern Washington (2020–2025)
- CFL draft: 2026: 4th round, 30th overall pick

Career history
- Toronto Argonauts (2026–present)
- Stats at CFL.ca

Nolan Ulm (born January 17, 2001) is a Canadian professional football wide receiver for the Toronto Argonauts of the Canadian Football League (CFL). He played college football for the Eastern Washington Eagles.

== College career ==
Ulm played college football for the Eastern Washington Eagles from 2020 to 2025. He played in 57 games, starting 32, where he had 117 receptions for 1,330 yards and 11 touchdowns.

== Professional career ==
Pre-draft measurables
Height	Weight	Arm length	Hand span	Wingspan	40-yard dash	10-yard split	20-yard split	20-yard shuttle	Three-cone drill	Vertical jump	Broad jump	Bench press
6 ft 2 in (1.88 m)	196 lb (89 kg)	31 5/8 in (0.80 m)	9 1/4 in (0.23 m)	6 ft 6 in (1.98 m)	4.74 s	1.52 s	2.69 s	4.94 s	7.23 s	34 in (0.86 m)	9 ft 10 in (3.00 m)	12 reps
All values from Pro Day

Ulm was selected by the Toronto Argonauts with the 30th overall pick in the fourth round of the 2026 CFL draft. On April 30, he signed with the team. On May 31, Ulm was placed on the six-game injured list. On July 24, he was promoted to the active roster and made his debut the following day.
