= Kyle Hergel =

Canadian-American football player (born 1999)

- Hergel with the Chicago Bears in 2026

No. 60 – Baltimore Ravens
- Position: Guard
- Roster status: Practice squad

Personal information
- Born: October 7, 1999 (age 27); Toronto, Ontario, Canada
- Listed height: 6 ft 2 in (1.88 m)
- Listed weight: 315 lb (143 kg)

Career information
- High school: Clarkson Secondary School (Clarkson, Mississauga)
- College: North Dakota (2018–2021); Texas State (2021–2022); Boston College (2023)
- NFL draft: 2024: undrafted
- CFL draft: 2024: 1st round, 3rd overall pick

Career history
- New Orleans Saints (2024); Chicago Bears (2025–2026)*; Baltimore Ravens (2026–present)
- * Offseason or practice squad member only

Career NFL statistics as of 2025
- Games played: 8
- Stats at Pro Football Reference

Kyle Hergel (born October 7, 1999) is a Canadian professional American football guard of the National Football League (NFL). He played college football for the North Dakota Fighting Hawks, Texas State Bobcats, and Boston College Eagles.

== Early life ==
Hergel was born on October 7, 1999, in Toronto, Ontario, Canada. From Mississauga, he attended Clarkson Secondary School, where he was team captain, but had no offers to play Division I college football. He initially committed to play for New Mexico Military Institute, but received a last-minute offer from the North Dakota Fighting Hawks which he accepted.

== College career ==
Hergel redshirted his first year at North Dakota, 2018, appearing in one game. He became a starter in 2019. He described his biggest strength as "My nastiness – I pride myself on being the meanest guy on the field at all times." That year, he started all 12 games at right guard and was chosen the FCS Independent Newcomer of the Year. He started the first five games in the 2020–21 season before entering the NCAA transfer portal.

Hergel transferred to the Texas State Bobcats for the fall 2021 season. In his first year, he started all 12 games, mainly at right guard, and was selected honorable mention All-Sun Belt Conference. He was named a team captain entering the 2022 season. He started all 12 games in 2022 and was named first-team all-conference by Pro Football Focus (PFF). He transferred to the Boston College Eagles for a final season of college football in 2023. He started all 13 games and was chosen honorable mention All-Atlantic Coast Conference (ACC). He ended his collegiate career with a total of 54 starts, allowing only five sacks on 1,774 snaps. He was invited to the 2024 East–West Shrine Bowl.

== Professional career ==
Pre-draft measurables
Height	Weight	Arm length	Hand span	Wingspan	40-yard dash	10-yard split	20-yard split	20-yard shuttle	Three-cone drill	Vertical jump	Broad jump	Bench press
6 ft 2 1/2 in (1.89 m)	302 lb (137 kg)	32 1/8 in (0.82 m)	10 1/2 in (0.27 m)	6 ft 7 3/4 in (2.03 m)	5.39 s	1.81 s	3.06 s	4.61 s	7.84 s	33 in (0.84 m)	9 ft 5 in (2.87 m)	30 reps
All values from Pro Day

=== New Orleans Saints ===
After going unselected in the 2024 NFL draft, Hergel signed with the New Orleans Saints as an undrafted free agent. He was also selected by the Saskatchewan Roughriders with the third overall pick of the 2024 CFL draft. He was waived on August 27, and re-signed to the practice squad. He was elevated to the active roster for the team's Week 4 game against the Atlanta Falcons and made his NFL debut in the 26–24 loss, appearing on four special teams snaps. He was waived on November 2, and re-signed to the practice squad. He was promoted to the active roster on November 30, but was waived by the team on December 7. On December 10, the Saints re–signed Hergel to their practice squad. He was signed to the team's active roster on December 28.

Hergel was waived by the Saints on August 25, 2025.

=== Chicago Bears ===
On November 4, 2025, Hergel signed with the Chicago Bears' practice squad. On January 20, 2026, he signed a reserve/futures contract with Chicago.

On August 30, 2026, Hergel was waived by the Bears as a part of final roster cuts; he was re-signed to the team's practice squad the following day. He was released by the Bears on September 22.

=== Baltimore Ravens ===
Hergel signed with the Baltimore Ravens' practice squad on September 30, 2026. He was promoted to the active roster on October 24. On November 10, Hergel was waived and re-signed to the practice squad two days later.
