= Aidan Laros =

South African gridiron football player (born 2002)

Profile
- Position: Punter

Personal information
- Born: 18 November 2002 (age 23); Cape Town, South Africa
- Listed height: 6 ft 2 in (1.88 m)
- Listed weight: 220 lb (100 kg)

Career information
- High school: Northwood (Pittsboro, North Carolina)
- College: Charlotte (2021–2022); UT Martin (2023); Kentucky (2024–2025)
- NFL draft: 2026: undrafted
- CFL draft: 2026G: 1st round, 1st overall pick

Career history
- Tampa Bay Buccaneers (2026)*; Pittsburgh Steelers (2026)*
- * Offseason or practice squad member only

Awards and highlights
- FCS Punter of the Year (2023); First-team FCS All-American (2023)

Aidan Laros (born 18 November 2002) is a South African professional football punter. He played college football at Charlotte, UT Martin and Kentucky.

== Early life ==
Aidan Laros was born to Adrian and Ann Laros on 18 September 2002, in Cape Town, South Africa. He moved to the United States in his freshman high school year, where he attended Northwood High School in Pittsboro, North Carolina. He grew up playing rugby union, and was named an all-America rugby player while in the U.S. During his senior year at Northwood, he helped the football team win the 3A Big 8 Conference championship, was named Conference Defensive Player of the Year and named to first-team all-league selection.

== College career ==
Laros began his college football career for the Charlotte 49ers of the University of North Carolina at Charlotte. He played all 12 games in 2022, punting 51 times for 3,093 yards (60.6 average) while also posting 28 touchbacks. For the 2023 season, Laros transferred to University of Tennessee at Martin, where played in all 11 games, punting 52 times for 2,458 yards (47.3 average) while also helping the team win the Big South–OVC championship. For his efforts, he was awarded the FCS Punter of the Year. For the 2024 season, Laros transferred to the University of Kentucky. He punted 32 times for 1,453 yards (45.4 average) and three touchbacks as a junior. He punted 50 times for 2,226 yards (44.9 average) as a senior in 2025.

== Professional career ==
After he went undrafted in the 2026 NFL draft, Laros was selected by the Ottawa Redblacks with the first overall pick of the 2026 CFL global draft. He did not sign with the Redblacks and instead signed with the Tampa Bay Buccaneers as an undrafted free agent on May 8, 2026. Laros was released by the Buccaneers on 8 June and claimed off waivers by the Pittsburgh Steelers the following day. He was released by the Steelers on 15 June.
