= Pierre Kemeni =

Canadian gridiron football player (born 2001)

- Kemeni with the BC Lions in 2026

No. 13 – BC Lions
- Position: Defensive back
- Roster status: Active
- CFL status: National

Personal information
- Born: September 19, 2001 (age 25); Milton, Ontario, Canada
- Listed height: 6 ft 1 in (1.85 m)
- Listed weight: 214 lb (97 kg)

Career information
- High school: Clarkson (Mississauga, Ontario)
- College: Ohio (2020–2021); Texas State (2022); Garden City (2023); New Mexico (2024); Ohio (2025)
- NFL draft: 2026: undrafted
- CFL draft: 2026: 4th round, 36th overall pick

Career history
- BC Lions (2026–present)
- Stats at CFL.ca

Pierre Kemeni Jr. (born September 19, 2001) is a Canadian professional football defensive back for the BC Lions of the Canadian Football League (CFL). He played college football for the Ohio Bobcats, Texas State Bobcats, Garden City Broncbusters and New Mexico Lobos.

== Early life ==
Kemeni was born on September 19, 2001, in Milton, Ontario. He attended Clarkson Secondary School in Mississauga, Ontario, where he lettered in football, soccer, basketball and track and field.

== College career ==
Kemeni played college football for the Ohio Bobcats in 2020 to 2021 and 2025, Texas State Bobcats in 2022, Garden City Broncbusters in 2023 and New Mexico Lobos in 2024. He played in 34 games at the FBS level, recording 24 tackles and one pass break up.

== Professional career ==
Pre-draft measurables
Height	Weight	Arm length	Hand span	Wingspan	40-yard dash	10-yard split	20-yard split	20-yard shuttle	Three-cone drill	Vertical jump	Broad jump	Bench press
6 ft 1 in (1.85 m)	212 lb (96 kg)	33 1/2 in (0.85 m)	9 5/8 in (0.24 m)	6 ft 8 1/4 in (2.04 m)	4.64 s	1.61 s	2.58 s	4.25 s	7.19 s	34 1/2 in (0.88 m)	10 ft 3 in (3.12 m)	17 reps
All values from Pro Day

Kemeni was selected by the BC Lions with the 36th overall pick in the fourth round of the 2026 CFL draft. He officially signed with the team on May 4, 2026.
