= Niklas Henning (American football) =

Canadian gridiron football player (born 2003)

No. 73 – Las Vegas Raiders
- Position: Offensive tackle
- Roster status: Practice squad

Personal information
- Born: May 12, 2003 (age 23); Munich, Germany
- Listed height: 6 ft 6 in (1.98 m)
- Listed weight: 287 lb (130 kg)

Career information
- High school: Craig Kielburger (Milton, Ontario)
- University: Queen's (2021–2025)
- NFL draft: 2026: undrafted
- CFL draft: 2026: 1st round, 2nd overall pick

Career history
- Las Vegas Raiders (2026–present)*
- * Offseason or practice squad member only

Awards and highlights
- 2× Second-team All-Canadian (2023, 2025); 2× First-team OUA All-star (2023, 2025)
- Stats at Pro Football Reference

Niklas Henning (born May 12, 2003) is a Canadian professional football offensive tackle for the Las Vegas Raiders of the National Football League (NFL). He played U Sports football for the Queen's Gaels.

== Early life ==
Henning was born on May 12, 2003, near Munich, Germany, and grew up in Milton, Ontario. He attended Craig Kielburger Secondary School in Milton.

== University career ==
Henning played U Sports football for the Queen's Gaels from 2021 to 2025. He walked-on to the team as an H-back, which he played as for the first three seasons. In 2023, Henning had seven receptions for 104 yards and a touchdown, earning first-team Ontario University Athletics All-star and second-team All-Canadian honors.

In 2024, he transitioned to offensive tackle which CFL scouts said would suit his physical attributes better. As a senior, Henning was again named an first-team All-star in the OUA and second-team All-Canadian.

== Professional career ==
Pre-draft measurables
Height	Weight	40-yard dash	20-yard shuttle	Three-cone drill	Vertical jump	Broad jump	Bench press
6 ft 5 3/4 in (1.97 m)	298 lb (135 kg)	4.90 s	4.82 s	7.70 s	31.5 in (0.80 m)	9 ft 6 1/8 in (2.90 m)	27 reps
All values from CFL Combine

After going undrafted in the 2026 NFL draft, Henning signed with the Las Vegas Raiders as an undrafted free agent. He was also selected with the second pick in the first round of the 2026 CFL Draft by the Toronto Argonauts. Henning was waived by Las Vegas on August 30, as a part of final roster cuts; he was re–signed to the team's practice squad the following day.
