= Nate DeMontagnac =

Canadian gridiron football player (born 2002)

- DeMontagnac with the BC Lions in 2026

No. 16 – BC Lions
- Position: Wide receiver
- Roster status: Active
- CFL status: National

Personal information
- Born: November 26, 2002 (age 23); Mississauga, Ontario, Canada
- Listed height: 6 ft 2 in (1.88 m)
- Listed weight: 186 lb (84 kg)

Career information
- College: North Dakota
- CFL draft: 2026: 1st round, 7th overall pick

Career history
- BC Lions (2026–present)
- Stats at CFL.ca

Nate DeMontagnac (born November 26, 2002) is a Canadian professional football wide receiver for the BC Lions of the Canadian Football League (CFL).

== College career ==
DeMontagnac played college football for the University of North Dakota Fighting Hawks from 2022 to 2025. He played in 40 games where he had 64 receptions for 775 yards and four touchdowns.

== Professional career ==
On May 4, 2026, DeMontagnac was drafted in the first round, seventh overall by the BC Lions in the 2026 CFL draft, and was immediately signed by the team. On June 12, 2026, DeMontagnac was placed on the Lions' 6-game injured list to start the 2026 CFL season, after suffering a shoulder injury during training camp. On July 30, 2026, DeMontagnac was shifted to the Lions' disabled list. On August 7, 2026, DeMontagnac was shifted to the Lions' reserve roster. He rejoined the active roster on August 12, 2026. On November 6, 2026, DeMontagnac was placed on the Lions' 1-game injured list ahead of the Western Final and he remained there to end the 2026 CFL season.
