= Collège Sainte-Anne =

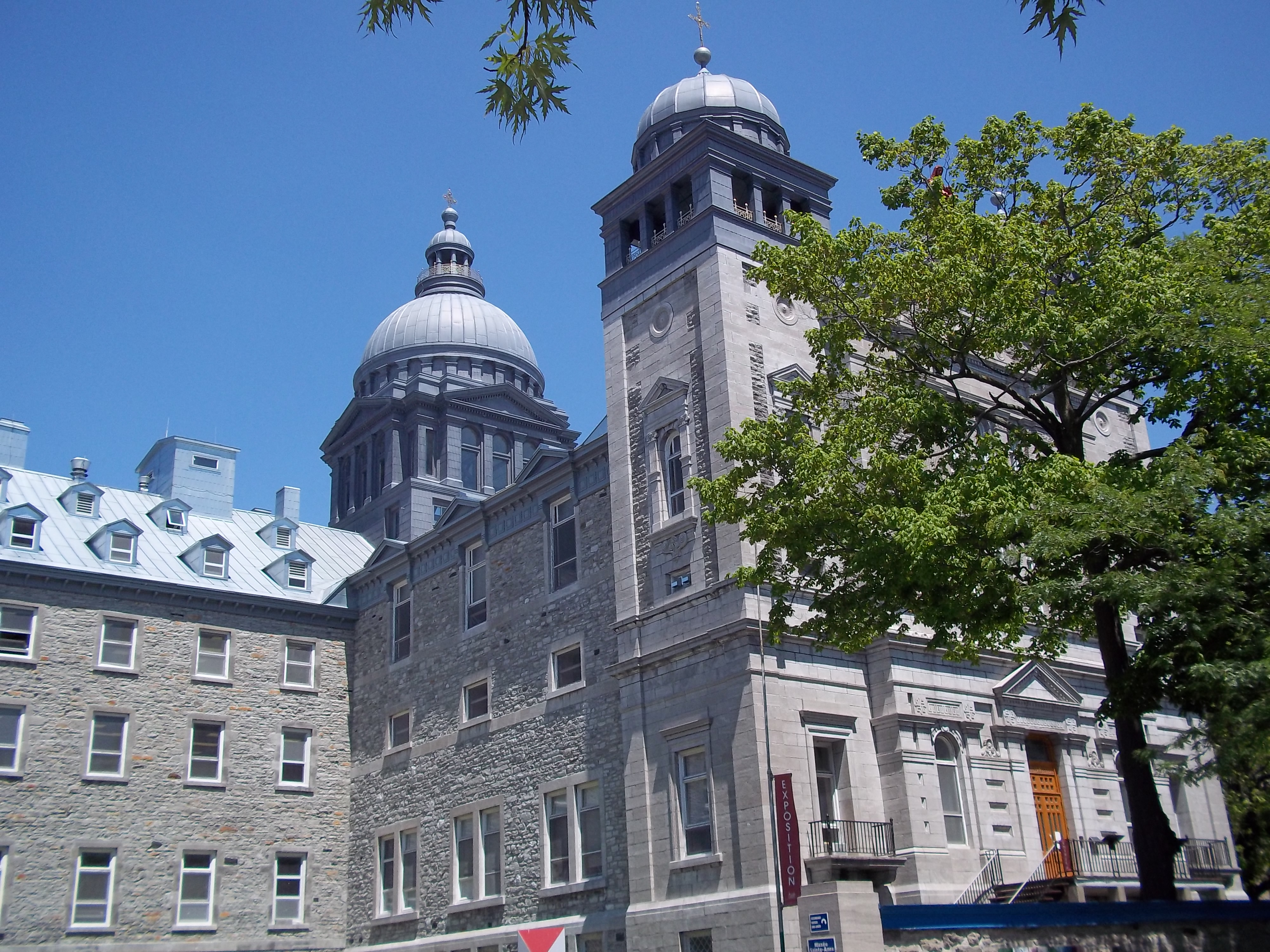

Location
- 1250, boulevard Saint-Joseph; Lachine, Quebec, H8S 2M8; Canada; 45.4323°N 73.6748°W

Information
- School type: Secondary school
- Motto: Cognosci ut melius facias (To know so as to better do)
- Established: 1861; 165 years ago
- Founder: Sisters of Saint Anne
- Principal: Ugo Cavenaghi
- Faculty: 191
- Grades: Secondary 1 to Secondary 5 (Grade 7 to Grade 11)
- Gender: Coeducational
- Enrollment: 1,952 total
- Language: French
- Colours: White, Blue, Gold
- Athletics: 12 Interscholastic sports 48 Interscholastic teams
- Mascot: Dragon
- Team name: Dragons
- Newspaper: Journal EKRI
- Website: secondaire.sainteanne.ca

Collège Sainte-Anne is a private Canadian corporation of primary, secondary and pre-university schools located in the western part of Montreal, Canada.

== History ==
Collège Sainte-Anne was founded in 1861 by the Sisters of Saint Anne, making it one of the oldest schools in Quebec.

== Reputation ==
In 2008, the Fraser Institute ranked its secondary school as one of the best private secondary schools in Quebec. In 2019, the Fraser Institute ranked its secondary school 15th out of all Quebec high schools. In 2026, the Fraser Institute reranked its secondary school 1st out of all Quebec high schools.

== Programs ==
At this College, there is 7 different programs.

Défimonde, SciMatic, Langues Sainte-Anne, Dragons+, Défisports, Arts-Technologies and Entrepreneuriat.

== See also ==
- List of colleges in Quebec
- Higher education in Quebec
