= Chase Henning =

Canadian gridiron football player (born 2002)

- Henning with the BC Lions in 2026

Profile
- Position: Linebacker

Personal information
- Born: September 10, 2002 (age 24)
- Listed height: 6 ft 0 in (1.83 m)
- Listed weight: 207 lb (94 kg)

Career information
- High school: Salmon Arm (Salmon Arm, British Columbia)
- University: UBC (2020–2025)
- CFL draft: 2026: 7th round, 63rd overall pick

Career history
- BC Lions (2026)

Awards and highlights
- Second-team All-Canadian (2024)
- Stats at CFL.ca

Chase Henning (born September 10, 2002) is a Canadian professional football linebacker. He played U Sports football for the UBC Thunderbirds.

== Early life ==
Henning was born on September 10, 2002. He attended Salmon Arm Secondary School in Salmon Arm, British Columbia.

== University career ==
Henning played U Sports football for the UBC Thunderbirds from 2020 to 2025. In 29 games, he had 101 tackles, including 3.5 for loss, one sack and one forced fumble. Henning was named a second-team All-Canadian in 2024.

== Professional career ==
Pre-draft measurables
Height	Weight	Arm length	Hand span	40-yard dash	10-yard split	20-yard split	20-yard shuttle	Three-cone drill	Broad jump	Bench press
6 ft 0 in (1.83 m)	207 lb (94 kg)	30 1/4 in (0.77 m)	8 3/4 in (0.22 m)	4.58 s	1.53 s	2.60 s	4.45 s	7.23 s	9 ft 7 in (2.92 m)	19 reps
All values from Pro Day

Henning was selected by the BC Lions with the 63rd overall pick in the seventh round of the 2026 CFL draft. He officially signed with the team on May 4, 2026. On May 31, Henning was signed to the practice roster. On July 3, 2026, Henning was promoted to the Lions' active roster, and made his CFL debut the next day, in a loss against the Edmonton Elks. On July 13, 2026, Henning was reassigned to the Lions' practice roster. On July 24, 2026, Henning was again promoted to the Lions' active roster. On July 30, 2026, Henning made his first tackle in a win against the Winnipeg Blue Bombers, on special teams. On August 7, 2026, Henning was again reassigned to the Lions' practice roster. On August 12, 2026, Henning was, for a third time, promoted to the Lions' active roster. On August 19, 2026, Henning was again reassigned to the Lions' practice roster. On September 24, 2026, Henning was, for the fourth time, promoted to the Lions' active roster. On September 28, 2026, Henning was again reassigned to the Lions' practice roster. On October 2, 2026, Henning was, for the fifth time, promoted to the Lions' active roster. On October 13, 2026, Henning was again reassigned to the Lions' practice roster. On October 17, 2026, Henning was, for the sixth time, promoted to the Lions' active roster. On October 26, 2026, Henning was again reassigned to the Lions' practice roster ahead of the Western Semi-Final. On November 8, 2026, Henning became a free agent as his contract expired at the conclusion of the Lions' season.
