= Parker McKenna =

American gridiron football player (born 2001)

- McKenna with the BC Lions in 2026

No. 42 – BC Lions
- Position: Linebacker
- Roster status: Active
- CFL status: American

Personal information
- Born: August 7, 2001 (age 25)
- Listed height: 6 ft 0 in (1.83 m)
- Listed weight: 225 lb (102 kg)

Career information
- High school: Beaverton (Beaverton, Oregon)
- College: Portland State (2020–2023); Washington State (2024–2025)
- NFL draft: 2026: undrafted

Career history
- BC Lions (2026–present)

Awards and highlights
- Pac-12 Defensive Top Performer (2025)
- Stats at CFL.ca

Parker McKenna (born August 7, 2001) is an American professional football linebacker for the BC Lions of the Canadian Football League (CFL). He played college football for the Portland State Vikings and Washington State Cougars.

== Early life ==
McKenna was born on August 6, 2001. He attended Beaverton High School in Beaverton, Oregon, and was an all-state selection and Metro League Defensive Player of the Year. McKenna was a two-star recruit and committed to play college football for the Portland State Vikings.

== College career ==
McKenna played college football for the Portland State Vikings from 2020 to 2023 and Washington State Cougars from 2024 to 2025. He played in 26 games at Portland State, recording 190 tackles, including 15 for loss, two sacks, one interception, five pass deflections, two forced fumbles and one fumble recovery. On December 31, 2023, McKenna transferred to Washington State University.

For Washington State, McKenna appeared in 25 games, recording 122 tackles, including six for loss, three sacks, one interception, two pass breakups, one forced fumble and fumble recovery. In 2025, he was named the Pac-12 Defensive Top Performer.

== Professional career ==
Pre-draft measurables
Height	Weight	Arm length	Hand span	Wingspan	40-yard dash	10-yard split	20-yard split	20-yard shuttle	Three-cone drill	Vertical jump	Broad jump	Bench press
6 ft 0 in (1.83 m)	223 lb (101 kg)	30 1/4 in (0.77 m)	9 3/8 in (0.24 m)	6 ft 8 3/4 in (2.05 m)	4.78 s	1.60 s	2.72 s	4.35 s	7.14 s	28 in (0.71 m)	9 ft 5 in (2.87 m)	24 reps
All values from Pro Day

On April 14, 2026, McKenna signed with the BC Lions of the Canadian Football League (CFL). He made his debut in the team's first game as a reserve, making one tackle on defense and special teams. On October 30, 2026, McKenna was placed on the Lions' 1-game injured list ahead of the Western Semi-Final and he remained there to end the 2026 CFL season.
