= Nick Cenacle =

Canadian gridiron football player (born 2001)

No. 85 – BC Lions
- Position: Wide receiver
- Roster status: Active
- CFL status: National

Personal information
- Born: September 13, 2001 (age 25); Ottawa, Ontario, Canada
- Listed height: 6 ft 1 in (1.85 m)
- Listed weight: 199 lb (90 kg)

Career information
- High school: Vanier College (Montreal)
- College: Hawaii (2022–2025)
- CFL draft: 2026: 5th round, 45th overall pick

Career history
- BC Lions (2026–present)
- Stats at CFL.ca

Nicholas Cenacle (born September 13, 2001) is a Canadian professional football wide receiver for the BC Lions of the Canadian Football League (CFL). He played college football for the Hawaii Rainbow Warriors.

== Early life ==
Cenacle was born on September 13, 2001, in Ottawa, Ontario, and attended Vanier College in Montreal.

== College career ==
Cenacle played college football for the Hawaii Rainbow Warriors from 2022 to 2025. He played in 44 games, starting 16, where he had 122 catches for 1,295 and nine touchdowns. In the 2025 Hawaii Bowl, Cenacle caught the game-winning touchdown against Cal. He finished the game with eight receptions for 59 yards and a touchdown in his final collegiate game.

== Professional career ==
Pre-draft measurables
Height	Weight	Arm length	Hand span	Wingspan	40-yard dash	10-yard split	20-yard split	20-yard shuttle	Three-cone drill	Vertical jump	Broad jump	Bench press
6 ft 2 in (1.88 m)	199 lb (90 kg)	31 1/8 in (0.79 m)	9 5/8 in (0.24 m)	6 ft 7 in (2.01 m)	4.74 s	1.64 s	2.64 s	4.41 s	6.96 s	31 1/2 in (0.80 m)	9 ft 10 in (3.00 m)	10 reps
All values from Pro Day

=== BC Lions ===
On April 28, 2026, Cenacle was selected by the BC Lions with the 45th overall pick in the fifth round of the 2026 CFL draft. On May 4, 2026, he officially signed with the team. Cenacle made his debut in week 3 against the Hamilton Tiger-Cats, recording nine receptions for 120 yards and two touchdowns. On August 12, 2026, Cenacle was placed on the Lions' reserve roster. On September 11, 2026, Cenacle was shifted to the Lions' 6-game injured list and he remained there to end the 2026 CFL season.
