= Kory Woodruff =

American gridiron football player (born 2000)

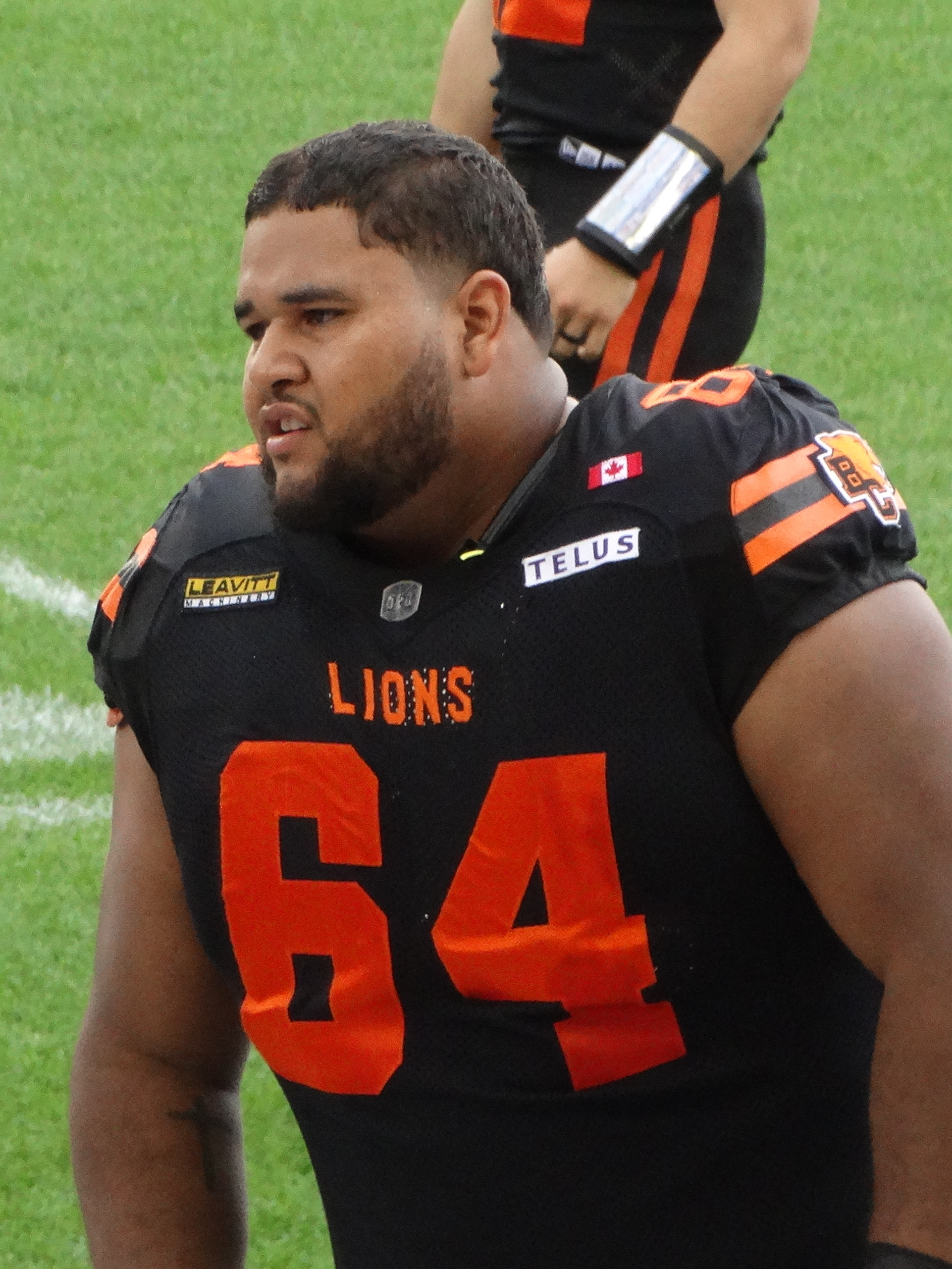
- Woodruff with the BC Lions in 2025

No. 64 – BC Lions
- Position: Offensive lineman
- Roster status: Active
- CFL status: American

Personal information
- Born: February 28, 2000 (age 26); Sioux City, Iowa, U.S.
- Listed height: 6 ft 3 in (1.91 m)
- Listed weight: 340 lb (154 kg)

Career information
- High school: West High (Sioux City, Iowa)
- College: Pittsburg State Gorillas; Briar Cliff Chargers
- NFL draft: 2022: undrafted

Career history
- 2023: Vegas Knight Hawks
- 2024–present: BC Lions
- Stats at CFL.ca

Kory Woodruff (born February 28, 2000) is an American professional football offensive lineman for the BC Lions of the Canadian Football League (CFL).

== College career ==
Woodruff first played college football for the Briar Cliff Chargers in 2018 to 2020. He then transferred to Pittsburg State University to play for the Gorillas, playing in 24 games from 2021 to 2022.

== Professional career ==
=== Vegas Knight Hawks ===
Woodruff signed with the Vegas Knight Hawks for the 2023 season where he played in eight games.

=== BC Lions ===
On February 20, 2024, Woodruff signed with the BC Lions. Following training camp, he accepted a practice roster position to start the 2024 season, but made his CFL debut on September 6, 2024, against the Montreal Alouettes. He played and started in five regular season games that year and also started at right guard in the West Semi-Final against the Saskatchewan Roughriders.

In 2025, Woodruff earned a starting position following training camp where he played and started in all 18 regular season games at left guard. That year, the Lions offence set a new CFL record as they averaged 8.04 yards per play. He also started in both playoff games that year.

As a pending free agent, it was announced on January 19, 2026, that Woodruff had agreed to a new two-year contract with the Lions. On October 22, 2026, Woodruff was placed on the Lions' 1-game injured list. He rejoined the active roster on October 30, 2026, ahead of the Western Semi-Final.

== Personal life ==
Woodruff was born to parents John Woodruff and Jacqueline Butts.
