= Rene Konga =

Cameroonian-Canadian football player (born 2002)

No. 95 – Miami Dolphins
- Position: Defensive tackle
- Roster status: Injured reserve

Personal information
- Born: November 14, 2002 (age 23); Ottawa, Ontario
- Listed height: 6 ft 4 in (1.93 m)
- Listed weight: 298 lb (135 kg)

Career information
- High school: Colonel By Secondary School (Ottawa, Ontario, Canada)
- College: Rutgers (2020–2023); Louisville (2024–2025)
- NFL draft: 2026: undrafted
- CFL draft: 2026: 6th round, 48th overall pick

Career history
- Miami Dolphins (2026–present)

Awards and highlights
- Second-team All-ACC (2025)
- Stats at Pro Football Reference

Rene Konga (born November 14, 2002) is a Cameroonian-Canadian professional American football defensive tackle for the Miami Dolphins of the National Football League (NFL). He played college football for the Rutgers Scarlet Knights and Louisville Cardinals.

== Early life ==
Konga was born on November 14, 2002, in Ottawa, Ontario, Canada. He initially played basketball before starting to play football at age 13. Konga played football at Colonel By Secondary School, earning league defensive MVP honors in 2019 while accounting for 21 offensive touchdowns. In high school, he was used at running back, defensive end, and placekicker. Konga initially planned to attend Clearwater Academy International in Florida in 2020, but instead reclassified to the class of 2020. A three-star prospect, he committed to play college football for the Rutgers Scarlet Knights.

== College career ==
Konga redshirted as a true freshman at Rutgers in 2020, then posted one tackle in two games in 2021, followed by five tackles, a tackle-for-loss (TFL), a sack and two passes defended in nine games in 2022. He totaled eight tackles, two TFLs and a sack in 2023 before entering the NCAA transfer portal. Konga transferred to the Louisville Cardinals for the 2024 season. He posted 20 tackles, three TFLs and two sacks while starting six games in 2024. In his last year, 2025, Konga started all 12 games he appeared in and tallied 29 tackles, five TFLs, 1.5 sacks and six passes defended, earning second-team All-Atlantic Coast Conference (ACC) honors. In his college career, he posted 63 tackles, eight passes defended and six sacks while appearing in 44 games. Konga participated in The American Bowl and the 2026 Senior Bowl.

== Professional career ==
Pre-draft measurables
Height	Weight	Arm length	Hand span	Wingspan	40-yard dash	10-yard split	20-yard split	20-yard shuttle	Three-cone drill	Vertical jump	Broad jump	Bench press
6 ft 3 3/4 in (1.92 m)	298 lb (135 kg)	33 5/8 in (0.85 m)	9 1/2 in (0.24 m)	6 ft 9 in (2.06 m)	4.82 s	1.60 s	2.80 s	4.59 s	7.03 s	37.0 in (0.94 m)	10 ft 2 in (3.10 m)	20 reps
All values from Pro Day

In addition to being an NFL draft prospect, Konga was ranked as the third-best prospect eligible for the 2026 CFL draft. Konga was drafted in the sixth round (48th overall) in the 2026 CFL draft by the Ottawa Redblacks. Konga went undrafted in the 2026 NFL draft and signed a free agent deal with the Miami Dolphins the following day. On August 4, head coach Jeff Hafley announced that Konga would miss the entirety of the 2026 season due to an undisclosed injury.
