= Brett Thorson =

American football player (born 2000)

No. 19 – Minnesota Vikings
- Position: Punter
- Roster status: Active

Personal information
- Born: January 6, 2000 (age 26); Melbourne, Australia
- Listed height: 6 ft 1 in (1.85 m)
- Listed weight: 237 lb (108 kg)

Career information
- High school: ProKick Australia
- College: Georgia (2022–2025)
- NFL draft: 2026: undrafted
- CFL draft: 2026G: 1st round, 7th overall pick

Career history
- Minnesota Vikings (2026–present)

Awards and highlights
- CFP national champion (2022); Ray Guy Award (2025); First-team All-American (2025); 2× Second-team All-SEC (2024, 2025)

Career NFL statistics as of Week 10, 2026
- Punts: 28
- Punting yards: 1,298
- Punting average: 46.4
- Longest punt: 66
- Inside 20: 16
- Stats at Pro Football Reference

Brett James Thorson (born 6 January 2000) is an Australian professional American football punter for the Minnesota Vikings of the National Football League (NFL). He played college football for the Georgia Bulldogs and he was signed as an undrafted free agent by the Vikings in 2026.

== Early life ==
Thorson attended the ProKick Australia academy. Working as a dairy farmer, he became a top punter recruit in the 2022 recruiting class, despite having never played American football. He committed to play college football at the University of Georgia.

== College career ==
As a freshman in 2022, Thorson assumed the role of Georgia's starting punter. Against Tennessee, he recorded a career-long 75-yard punt. He finished his freshman season with 36 punts for 1,620 yards, with an average of 45.0 yards. As a sophomore in 2023, he totaled 32 punts for 1,403 yards, and an average of 43.8 yards per punt. In 2024, Thorson was named a finalist for the Ray Guy Award. Against Tennessee, Thorson tackled Boo Carter during a punt return, potentially saving a touchdown, as Georgia went on to win 31–17. In the 2024 SEC Championship Game, he was injured while attempting to make a tackle, requiring him to undergo surgery on his non-kicking leg, prematurely ending his season.

=== Statistics ===
College statistics
Season	Team	Games	Punting			
Season	Team	GP	Punts	Avg	Lng	Yds
2022	Georgia	14	36	45.0	75	1,620
2023	Georgia	13	32	43.8	60	1,403
2024	Georgia	13	42	47.6	60	1,998
2025	Georgia	12	46	45.5	66	2,094
Career		52	156	45.6	75	7,115

== Professional career ==
Pre-draft measurables
Height	Weight	Arm length	Hand span	Wingspan
6 ft 1 1/4 in (1.86 m)	237 lb (108 kg)	30 3/8 in (0.77 m)	9 1/4 in (0.23 m)	6 ft 2 5/8 in (1.90 m)
All values from NFL Combine

Thorson was signed as an undrafted free agent by the Minnesota Vikings after the conclusion of the 2026 NFL draft. Additionally, he was drafted in the first round (7th overall) by the BC Lions in the 2026 CFL global draft.
