= Carter Kettyle =

Canadian gridiron football player (born 2004)

No. 80 – Edmonton Elks
- Position: Wide receiver
- Roster status: 6-game injured list
- CFL status: National

Personal information
- Born: April 25, 2004 (age 22)
- Listed height: 6 ft 0 in (1.83 m)
- Listed weight: 196 lb (89 kg)

Career information
- High school: St. Joseph's Catholic (Grande Prairie, Alberta)
- University: Alberta (2022–2025)
- CFL draft: 2026: 3rd round, 21st overall pick

Career history
- Edmonton Elks (2026–present)

Awards and highlights
- Grey Cup champion (2026); First-team All-Canadian (2025)
- Stats at CFL.ca

Carter Kettyle (born April 25, 2004) is a Canadian professional football wide receiver for the Edmonton Elks of the Canadian Football League (CFL). He played U Sports football for the Alberta Golden Bears.

== U Sports career ==
Kettyle played U Sports football for the Alberta Golden Bears from 2022 to 2025. In 25 games, he recorded 104 catches for 1,717 yards and 16 touchdowns. Kettyle had one kick return touchdown and passing touchdown in 2023 and 2025, respectively. He also served as the team's punter in 2025, punting 40 times for 1,582 yards for an average of 39.6 yards per kick and a long of 52. In his senior year, he was named a first-team All-Canadian as a receiver.

== Professional career ==
Pre-draft measurables
Height	Weight	40-yard dash	20-yard shuttle	Three-cone drill	Vertical jump	Broad jump	Bench press
6 ft 0 3/8 in (1.84 m)	196 lb (89 kg)	4.63 s	4.40 s	7.07 s	34 in (0.86 m)	9 ft 10 in (3.00 m)	7 reps
All values from CFL Combine

Kettyle was selected by the Edmonton Elks with the 21st overall pick in the third round of the 2026 CFL draft. On May 4, 2026, he officially signed with the team. Kettyle caught his first touchdown on August 8, in a loss to the Montreal Alouettes.
