= Chris Pashula =

Canadian gridiron football player (born 2003)

No. 63 – Edmonton Elks
- Position: Offensive lineman
- Roster status: Active
- CFL status: National

Personal information
- Born: August 22, 2003 (age 23)
- Listed height: 6 ft 3 in (1.91 m)
- Listed weight: 314 lb (142 kg)

Career information
- High school: Saint Francis (Calgary, Alberta)
- University: Calgary (2021–2025)
- CFL draft: 2026: 6th round, 50th overall pick

Career history
- Edmonton Elks (2026–present)

Awards and highlights
- Grey Cup champion (2026)
- Stats at CFL.ca

Chris Pashula (born August 22, 2003) is a Canadian professional football offensive lineman for the Edmonton Elks of the Canadian Football League (CFL). He played U Sports football for the Calgary Dinos.

== Early life ==
Pashula was born on August 22, 2003. He attended Saint Francis High School in Calgary, Alberta.

== University career ==
Pashula played U Sports football for the Calgary Dinos from 2021 to 2025. He played 30 games and started in 16.

== Professional career ==
Pashula was selected with the 50th pick in the sixth round of the 2026 CFL draft by the Edmonton Elks. On May 31, he was signed to the practice roster. On July 16, Pashula was elevated to the active roster and made his CFL debut the following day against the BC Lions. On August 6, he was signed to the practice roster. On August 13, Pashula was promoted to the active roster. On September 3, he was demoted back to the practice roster. On October 23, Pashula was elevated to the active roster for the final regular season game. He played in six games during the season as a reserve lineman. On October 25, Pashula was re-signed to the practice roster. On November 6, he was elevated for the West Final games against the BC Lions.
