= 2026 CFL global draft =

Canadian football draft

General information
- Sport: Canadian football
- Date: April 29, 2026
- Time: 1:00 pm EDT
- Location: Toronto, Ontario
- Network: CFL.ca

Overview
- 18 total selections in 2 rounds
- League: Canadian Football League
- First selection: Aidan Laros, Ottawa Redblacks
- U Sports selections: 0
- NCAA selections: 17

The 2026 CFL global draft was a selection of non-Canadian and non-American players by Canadian Football League (CFL) teams that took place on April 29, 2026, at 1:00 pm ET. It was the sixth CFL draft that pools all of the global players together after previously having separate drafts for Mexican players and European players in 2019.

== Draft format ==
For the fourth consecutive year, the global draft featured two rounds with a total of 18 selections and the draft order was based on the waiver priority (reverse standings from the previous year). Unlike previous years, the global draft did not precede its National draft counterpart on the same day, but instead followed it the day after.

== Draft order ==
=== Round one ===
Pick #	CFL team	Player	Position	University	Nationality
1	Ottawa Redblacks	Aidan Laros	P	Kentucky	South Africa
2	Toronto Argonauts	Jordan Spasojevic-Moko	OL	California	Australia
3	Edmonton Elks	Jesús Gómez	K	Arizona State	Mexico
4	Winnipeg Blue Bombers	Edward Vesterinen	DL	West Virginia	Finland
5	Hamilton Tiger-Cats	Nick Haberer	P	Vanderbilt	Australia
6	Calgary Stampeders	Jude McAtamney	K	Rutgers	Northern Ireland
7	BC Lions	Brett Thorson	P	Georgia	Australia
8	Montreal Alouettes	Mark Petry	OL	Syracuse	Germany
9	Saskatchewan Roughriders	Mapalo Mwansa	LB	Loughborough	England

=== Round two ===
Pick #	CFL team	Player	Position	University	Nationality
10	Ottawa Redblacks	Paul Geelen	K	Southern Illinois	Netherlands
11	Toronto Argonauts	Fa'alili Fa'amoe	OL	Wake Forest	American Samoa
12	Edmonton Elks	Jeffrey M'Ba	DL	Southern Methodist	France
13	Winnipeg Blue Bombers	Keegan Andrews	P	Massachusetts	Australia
14	Hamilton Tiger-Cats	Mitch McCarthy	P	Indiana	Australia
15	Calgary Stampeders	Jireh Ojata	DL	Purdue	Nigeria
16	BC Lions	Seydou Traore	TE	Mississippi State	England
17	Montreal Alouettes	Jack Burgess	P	Texas Tech	Australia
18	Saskatchewan Roughriders	Kansei Matsuzawa	K	Hawaii	Japan

== Trades ==
In the explanations below, (D) denotes trades that took place during the draft, while (PD) indicates trades completed pre-draft.

- None
