= Justin Pace =

Canadian gridiron football player (born 2003)

No. 49 – Edmonton Elks
- Position: Linebacker
- Roster status: Active
- CFL status: National

Personal information
- Born: February 14, 2003 (age 23)
- Listed height: 6 ft 0 in (1.83 m)
- Listed weight: 218 lb (99 kg)

Career information
- High school: Miami Killian (Miami, Florida)
- University: Queen's (2022–2025)
- CFL draft: 2026: 4th round, 35th overall pick

Career history
- Edmonton Elks (2026–present)

Awards and highlights
- Grey Cup champion (2026); First-team All-Canadian (2024); First-team OUA All-star (2024)
- Stats at CFL.ca

Justin Pace (born February 14, 2003) is a Canadian professional football linebacker for the Edmonton Elks of the Canadian Football League (CFL). He played U Sports football for the Queen's Gaels.

== Early life ==
Pace was born on February 14, 2003, and his hometown is Montreal, Quebec, Canada. He attended Miami Killian Senior High School in Miami, Florida.

== University career ==
Pace played U Sports football for the Queen's Gaels from 2022 to 2025. He played 42 games, recording 232 tackles, including 13 for loss, four sacks, six interceptions, one for a touchdown, eight pass deflections, three forced fumbles and fumble recoveries. In 2024, Pace was named a first-team OUA all-star and All-Canadian.

== Professional career ==
Pre-draft measurables
Height	Weight	40-yard dash	20-yard shuttle	Three-cone drill	Vertical jump	Broad jump
6 ft 0 1/8 in (1.83 m)	218 lb (99 kg)	4.84 s	4.32 s	7.22 s	30 1/2 in (0.77 m)	9 ft 2 1/4 in (2.80 m)
All values from CFL Combine

Pace was selected by the Edmonton Elks with the 35th overall pick in the fourth round of the 2026 CFL draft. He officially signed with the team on May 4, 2026. Pace made his professional debut on June 6, registering one special teams tackle. On July 8, he was placed on the one-game injured list and was subsequently removed on July 16.
