= David Gusta =

American football player

No. 96 – BC Lions
- Position: Defensive tackle
- Roster status: Active
- CFL status: American

Personal information
- Born: San Bernardino, California, U.S.
- Listed height: 6 ft 2 in (1.88 m)
- Listed weight: 308 lb (140 kg)

Career information
- High school: Cajon (San Bernardino, California)
- College: Washington State (2021–2024); Kentucky (2025)

Career history
- 2026–present: BC Lions
- Stats at CFL.ca

David Gusta is an American professional football defensive tackle for the BC Lions of the Canadian Football League (CFL). He played college football for the Kentucky Wildcats and the Washington State Cougars.

== Early life ==
Gusta attended Grand Terrace High School in Grand Terrace, California. He initially committed to play college football for the Fresno State Bulldogs before flipping his commitment to the Washington State Cougars.

== College career ==
=== Washington State ===
As a freshman in 2021, Gusta took a redshirt and did not play any games. In 2022, he tallied 11 tackles with one going for a loss in 10 games. In 2023, Gusta recorded 30 tackles, with two being for a loss, and half a sack in 10 starts. In week 2 of the 2024 season, he notched three tackles in a victory over Texas Tech. In week 11, Gusta notched his first sack of the season in a win over Utah State. In the 2024 season, he totaled 21 tackles with three being for a loss, a sack, and three pass deflections. After the season, Gusta entered his name into the NCAA transfer portal.

=== Kentucky ===
Gusta transferred to play for the Kentucky Wildcats.

== Professional career ==
Pre-draft measurables
Height	Weight	Arm length	Hand span	Wingspan	40-yard dash	10-yard split	20-yard split	Vertical jump	Broad jump	Bench press
6 ft 2 3/8 in (1.89 m)	308 lb (140 kg)	31 1/8 in (0.79 m)	10 in (0.25 m)	6 ft 4 1/4 in (1.94 m)	4.88 s	1.68 s	2.81 s	32.0 in (0.81 m)	8 ft 1 in (2.46 m)	37 reps
All values from NFL Combine/Pro Day

=== BC Lions ===
On April 27, 2026, Gusta signed with the BC Lions of the Canadian Football League (CFL). On May 31, 2026, he was assigned to the Lions' practice roster to start the 2026 CFL season. On August 7, 2026, Gusta was promoted to the Lions' active roster. On September 3, 2026, Gusta was reassigned to Lions' practice roster. On September 24, 2026, Gusta was again promoted to the Lions' active roster. On October 2, 2026, Gusta was placed on the Lions' reserve roster after suffering a head injury the previous week and he remained there to end the 2026 CFL season.
