= Dariel Djabome =

Canadian gridiron football player (born 1999)

No. 45 – Edmonton Elks
- Position: Defensive linemen
- Roster status: Active
- CFL status: National

Personal information
- Born: July 15, 2003 (age 23)
- Listed height: 6 ft 2 in (1.88 m)
- Listed weight: 235 lb (107 kg)

Career information
- High school: Canada Prep Academy
- College: Rutgers (2022–2025)
- CFL draft: 2026: 1st round, 3rd overall pick

Career history
- 2026–present: Edmonton Elks

Awards and highlights
- Grey Cup champion (2026)

Dariel Djabome (born September 8, 1999) is a Canadian professional football linebacker for the Edmonton Elks of the Canadian Football League (CFL).

== Early life ==
Djabome grew up in Longueil, Quebec and attended Canada Prep Academy in Toronto. He received scholarship offers from Maine and Buffalo after his COVID-shortened season. After a private camp with coach Greg Schiano, Djabome committed to play college football at Rutgers.

== University career ==
Djabome played four seasons for Rutgers. In his first two seasons, he posted 14 total tackles but broke out as a junior, finishing with team-high 105 tackles. He was a finalist for the Jon Cornish Trophy in 2024, which is awarded annually to the top Canadian player in NCAA football. In 2025, Djabome was a team captain and was named an All-Big Ten honorable mention. In his career, he had 192 total tackles, 13 tackles for loss, 5.5 sacks, four forced fumbles, two fumble recoveries, and one pass knockdown.

== Professional career ==
Djabome did not take part in the CFL Combine but was selected third overall in the 2026 CFL draft by the Edmonton Elks. He signed with the team on May 13.
