= 2026 CFL draft =

Canadian football draft

General information
- Sport: Canadian football
- Date: April 28, 2026
- Time: 7:00 pm EDT
- Location: Toronto, Ontario
- Network: TSN

Overview
- 74 total selections in 8 rounds
- League: CFL
- First selection: Giordano Vaccaro, Ottawa Redblacks
- Most selections (11): Toronto Argonauts
- Fewest selections (7): BC Lions; Calgary Stampeders; Ottawa Redblacks
- U Sports selections: 45
- NCAA selections: 29

The 2026 CFL national draft was a selection of national players by Canadian Football League teams that took place on April 28, 2026. Seventy-four players were chosen from among eligible players from Canadian Universities across the country, as well as Canadian players playing in the NCAA or NAIA.

== Format ==
The draft featured eight rounds of selections, with each team receiving one selection per round in reverse standings order from the 2025 CFL season. As per the 2022 collective bargaining agreement, the two teams that had National players featured in the highest percentage of snaps played in the 2025 CFL season (the Edmonton Elks and Winnipeg Blue Bombers) were each awarded an additional second-round pick. The first two rounds were broadcast on TSN and streamed on TSN+, while rounds 3 through 8 were streamed solely on TSN+.

== Top prospects ==
Source: CFL Scouting Bureau rankings.

Final ranking	January ranking	August ranking	Player	Position	University	Hometown
1	1	1	Akheem Mesidor	Defensive lineman	Miami (FL)	Ottawa, ON
2	2	2	Logan Taylor	Offensive lineman	Boston College	Lunenburg, NS
3	4	7	Rene Konga	Defensive lineman	Louisville	Ottawa, ON
4	5	3	Wesley Bailey	Defensive lineman	Louisville	Ottawa, ON
5	3	5	Albert Reese IV	Offensive lineman	Mississippi State	Edmonton, AB
6	10	16	Rohan Jones	Tight end	Arkansas	Montreal, QC
7	–	–	Kevin Cline	Offensive lineman	Boston College	Boca Raton, FL
8	7	10	Dariel Djabome	Linebacker	Rutgers	Longueuil, QC
9	6	6	Jett Elad	Defensive back	Rutgers	Mississauga, ON
10	9	12	Malcolm Bell	Defensive back	Michigan State	Montreal, QC
11	19	11	Giordano Vaccaro	Offensive lineman	Purdue	Winnipeg, MB
12	8	–	Nuer Gatkuoth	Defensive lineman	Wake Forest	Edmonton, AB
13	12	13	Darius Bell	Offensive lineman	East Carolina	Hamilton, ON
14	–	–	Niklas Henning	Offensive lineman	Queen's	Milton, ON
15	11	4	Nick Cenacle	Wide receiver	Hawaii	Montreal, QC
16	20	–	Émeric Boutin	Fullback	Laval	L'Assomption, QC
17	–	–	Malick Meiga	Wide receiver	Coastal Carolina	Montreal, QC
18	18	–	Nate DeMontagnac	Wide receiver	North Dakota	Mississauga, ON
19	15	–	Jonathan Denis	Offensive lineman	Louisiana Tech	Homestead, FL
20	13	18	Darius McKenzie	Linebacker	South Alabama	Ottawa, ON
–	14	8	Devynn Cromwell	Defensive back	Michigan State	Toronto, ON
–	16	19	Aamarii Notice	Defensive lineman	Coastal Carolina	Toronto, ON
–	17	9	Nolan Ulm	Wide receiver	Eastern Washington	Kelowna, BC
–	–	14	Jez Janvier	Offensive lineman	Southern Mississippi	Montreal, QC
–	–	15	Josh Baka	Defensive back	Alabama–Birmingham	Ottawa, ON
–	–	17	Tyrell Lawrence	Offensive lineman	Alabama A&M	Milton, ON
–	–	20	Trae Tomlinson	Defensive back	Louisiana	Winnipeg, MB

== Draft order ==
=== Round one ===
Pick #	CFL team	Player	Position	University
1	Ottawa Redblacks	Giordano Vaccaro	OL	Purdue
2	Toronto Argonauts	Niklas Henning	OL	Queen's
3	Edmonton Elks	Dariel Djabome	LB	Rutgers
4	Winnipeg Blue Bombers	Nuer Gatkuoth	DL	Wake Forest
5	Hamilton Tiger-Cats	Jonathan Denis	OL	Louisiana Tech
6	Calgary Stampeders	Eric Rascoe	LB	Angelo State
7	BC Lions	Nate DeMontagnac	WR	North Dakota
8	Montreal Alouettes	Rohan Jones	TE	Arkansas
9	Saskatchewan Roughriders	Malcolm Bell	DB	Michigan State

=== Round two ===
Pick #	CFL team	Player	Position	University
10	Winnipeg Blue Bombers (via Ottawa)	Dante Daniels	TE	North Carolina State
11	Toronto Argonauts	Isaiah Smith	RB	Guelph
12	Edmonton Elks	Benjamin Sangmuah	DB	British Columbia
13	Ottawa Redblacks (via Winnipeg)	Émeric Boutin	FB	Laval
14	Hamilton Tiger-Cats	Malick Meiga	WR	Coastal Carolina
15	BC Lions (via Calgary)	Jett Elad	DB	Rutgers
16	Toronto Argonauts (via BC)	Ethan John	DB	Windsor
17	Montreal Alouettes	Shakespeare Louis	DB	Southeastern Louisiana
18	Saskatchewan Roughriders	Dylan Djete	WR	Alabama State
19N	Edmonton Elks	Wesley Bailey	DL	Louisville
20N	Winnipeg Blue Bombers	Kevin Cline	OL	Boston College

=== Round three ===
Pick #	CFL team	Player	Position	University
21	Edmonton Elks (via Ottawa)	Carter Kettyle	WR	Alberta
22	Toronto Argonauts	Louis-Philippe Gauthier	DB	Montreal
23	Toronto Argonauts (via Ottawa via Edmonton)	Darius McKenzie	LB	South Alabama
24	Winnipeg Blue Bombers	Charles-Elliot Bouliane	LB	Montreal
25	Hamilton Tiger-Cats	Devynn Cromwell	DB	Michigan State
26	Calgary Stampeders	Jesulayomi Ojutalayo	WR	Wilfrid Laurier
27	Calgary Stampeders (via BC)	Tristan Marois	DL	Colorado
28	Montreal Alouettes	Nathan Udoh	WR	Manitoba
29	Saskatchewan Roughriders	Darius Bell	OL	East Carolina

=== Round four ===
Pick #	CFL team	Player	Position	University
30	Toronto Argonauts (via Ottawa)	Nolan Ulm	WR	Eastern Washington
31	Ottawa Redblacks (via Toronto)	Charlie Parks	DL	Saskatchewan
32	Edmonton Elks	Spencer Walsh	OL	Wilfrid Laurier
33	Winnipeg Blue Bombers	Ethan Stuart	DB	McMaster
34	Hamilton Tiger-Cats	Brayden Szeman	OL	Calgary
35	Edmonton Elks (via Ottawa via Calgary)	Justin Pace	LB	Queen's
36	BC Lions	Pierre Kemeni	DB	Ohio
37	Montreal Alouettes	Liam Talbot	RB	Windsor
38	Saskatchewan Roughriders	Osasere Odemwingie	LB	Calgary

=== Round five ===
Pick #	CFL team	Player	Position	University
39	Ottawa Redblacks	Alassane Diouf	OL	Montreal
40	Toronto Argonauts	Frank Vreugdenhil	OL	McMaster
41	Ottawa Redblacks (via Edmonton)	Benjamin Dobson	LB	Calgary
42	Winnipeg Blue Bombers	Brody Clark	LB	York
43	Hamilton Tiger-Cats	Loik Gagne	LB	Concordia (QC)
44	Calgary Stampeders	Matt Sibley	WR	Calgary
45	BC Lions	Nick Cenacle	WR	Hawaii
46	Montreal Alouettes	Harrison Daley	DB	Windsor
47	Saskatchewan Roughriders	Jez Janvier	OL	Southern Mississippi

=== Round six ===
Pick #	CFL team	Player	Position	University
48	Ottawa Redblacks	Rene Konga	DL	Louisville
49	Toronto Argonauts	Tyriq Quayson	WR	Windsor
50	Edmonton Elks	Chris Pashula	OL	Calgary
51	Winnipeg Blue Bombers	Ben Britton	WR	Calgary
52	Hamilton Tiger-Cats	Marc Djonay Rondeu	LB	Ottawa (ON)
53	Calgary Stampeders	Mitchell Schechinger	OL	Guelph
54	BC Lions	Ethan Graham	OL	Regina
55	Montreal Alouettes	Michael Horvat	K	McMaster
56	Saskatchewan Roughriders	Albert Reese IV	OL	Mississippi State

=== Round seven ===
Pick #	CFL team	Player	Position	University
57	Toronto Argonauts (via Ottawa)	Nathan Walker	K/P	York
58	Edmonton Elks (via Toronto)	Eloa Latendresse-Regimbald	WR/QB	McGill
59	Edmonton Elks	Matthew Ljuden	OL	Alberta
60	Winnipeg Blue Bombers	Josh Jack	WR	Saint Mary's
61	Hamilton Tiger-Cats	Aamarii Notice	DL	Coastal Carolina
62	Calgary Stampeders	Steven Kpehe	DL	Queen's
63	BC Lions	Chase Henning	DB	British Columbia
64	Montreal Alouettes	Cyrus McGarrell	DB	Northern Illinois
65	Saskatchewan Roughriders	Sherman McBean	WR	British Columbia

=== Round eight ===
Pick #	CFL team	Player	Position	University
66	Ottawa Redblacks	Josh Connors	LB	Wilfrid Laurier
67	Toronto Argonauts	Weagbe Mombo	RB	Windsor
68	Toronto Argonauts (via Edmonton)	Sebastian Parsalidis	FB	Wilfrid Laurier
69	Winnipeg Blue Bombers	Brady Lidster	K	Windsor
70	Hamilton Tiger-Cats	Kyler Laing	LB	Mercyhurst
71	Calgary Stampeders	Jack Warrack	OL	Saskatchewan
72	BC Lions	Ebenezer Dibula	DL	Kennesaw State
73	Montreal Alouettes	Zachary Houde	WR	St. Francis Xavier
74	Saskatchewan Roughriders	Ryan Speight	FB	Wilfrid Laurier

== Trades ==
In the explanations below, (D) denotes trades that took place during the draft, while (PD) indicates trades completed pre-draft.

=== Round two ===
- Calgary → BC (PD). Calgary traded a second-round pick in this year's draft and the ninth overall pick and the 29th overall pick in the 2025 CFL draft to BC in exchange for Vernon Adams, a third-round pick in this year's draft, and the 32nd overall pick in the 2025 CFL draft.
- BC → Toronto (PD). BC traded a second-round pick in this year's draft and Ryder Varga to Toronto in exchange for Dejon Allen.
- Ottawa ←→ Winnipeg (D). Ottawa traded the 10th overall pick in this year's draft to Winnipeg in exchange for the 13th overall pick in this year's draft and a second-round pick in the 2027 CFL draft.

=== Round three ===
- BC → Calgary (PD). BC traded a third-round pick in this year's draft, Vernon Adams, and the 32nd overall pick in the 2025 CFL draft to Calgary in exchange for a second-round pick in this year's draft and the ninth overall pick and the 29th overall in the 2025 CFL draft.
- Edmonton ←→ Ottawa (PD). Edmonton traded the 23rd overall pick in this year's draft, Nyles Morgan, and a fifth-round pick in this year's draft to Ottawa in exchange for the 21st overall pick and a fourth-round pick in this year's draft.
- Ottawa → Toronto (PD). Ottawa traded the 23rd overall pick in this year's draft and a conditional third-round pick in the 2027 CFL draft to Toronto in exchange for the playing rights to Luiji Vilain and the 31st overall pick in this year's draft.

=== Round four ===
- Calgary → Ottawa (PD). Calgary traded a fourth-round pick in this year's draft to Ottawa in exchange for Lorenzo Mauldin.
- Ottawa → Edmonton (PD). Ottawa traded the 35th overall pick in this year's draft and a third-round pick in this year's draft to Edmonton in exchange for a third-round pick, Nyles Morgan, and a fifth-round pick in this year's draft.
- Ottawa → Toronto (PD). Ottawa traded a conditional sixth-round pick in this year's draft and the negotiation rights to Andre Carter to Toronto in exchange for Daniel Adeboboye. This was confirmed to be upgraded to a fourth-round pick upon the release of the draft order.
- Toronto → Ottawa (PD). Toronto traded the 31st overall pick in this year's draft and the playing rights to Luiji Vilain to Ottawa in exchange for the 23rd overall pick in this year's draft and a conditional third-round pick in the 2027 CFL draft.

=== Round five ===
- Edmonton → Ottawa (PD). Edmonton traded the 41st overall pick in this year's draft, Nyles Morgan, and a fifth-round pick in this year's draft to Ottawa in exchange for a third-round pick and a fourth-round pick in this year's draft.

=== Round seven ===
- Ottawa → Toronto (PD). Ottawa traded a seventh-round pick in this year's draft to Toronto in exchange for Mark Milton.
- Toronto → Edmonton (PD). Toronto traded a conditional eighth-round pick in this year's draft to Edmonton in exchange for the negotiation rights to Spencer Brown. This was confirmed to be upgraded to a seventh-round pick while the Argonauts received the Elks' eighth-round pick upon the release of the draft order.

=== Round eight ===
- Edmonton → Toronto (PD). Edmonton traded an eighth-round pick in this year's draft and the negotiation rights to Spencer Brown to Toronto in exchange for a seventh-round pick.
