= Clarkson Secondary School =

Location
- 2524 Bromsgrove Road; Mississauga, Ontario, L5J 1L8; Canada; 43.504029°N 79.646131°W

Information
- School type: Public, high school
- Motto: Committed to Excellence
- Founded: 1969
- School board: Peel District School Board
- Superintendent: Mary Zammit
- Area trustee: Brad MacDonald
- Principal: Kristy Zammit
- Staff: 104 teachers, 2 vice-principals, 6 secretaries, 8 janitors, 4 cafeteria staff
- Grades: 9-12+
- Enrolment: 754 (April 2025)
- Language: English, French immersion
- Campus: Urban
- Area: Clarkson
- Colours: Gold and Black
- Mascot: Charlie the Charger (horse)
- Team name: Clarkson Chargers
- Newspaper: Clarkson Communicates
- Feeder schools: Hillside Senior Public School, Green Glade Senior Public School, Hillcrest Public School
- Website: clarksonss.peelschools.org

Clarkson Secondary School is a high school in Clarkson community of Mississauga, Ontario, Canada; designated Ward 18 by the Peel District School Board. Clarkson is an average school in both population (11th, at 866 students) and age (13th, built in 1969) of the entire Peel range of 28 public secondary schools. It is also known as the "Peel Academy for International Students".

== History ==
Clarkson was designed like many 1970s-era schools in Ontario as part of an experimental open concept design. On the ground floor, the cafeteria and auditorium are central to the design; a tech/drama wing, staff room, and gymnasiums are placed on the west side, while a classroom wing adorns the east side. These were open to the hallways, to other classrooms, separated only by pillars. Other schools using the same concepts include The Woodlands Secondary School, Bayridge Secondary School, and St. Thomas More Catholic School. During the late 1970s, the design was abandoned for a more traditional approach, as such designs proved deficient in the leakage of noise from other classes.

== Notable alumni ==
- Don Biggs - Former professional ice hockey player
- Brad Boyes - NHL hockey player
- Francis D'Souza - CityTV Personality
- Kyle Hergel - NFL football player
- Sean Jones - R&B singer
- Don Kerr - Multi-instrumentalist and record producer
- Matt Kudu - CFL football player
- Nick Mardner – CFL football player
- Shaun Majumder - Comedian, writer, and actor
- M. H. Murray - Filmmaker
- Camilla Scott - Actress and host of the television show The Camilla Scott Show
- Barbara Turnbull - Journalist and Activist for people with Disabilities
- Debbie Van Kiekebelt - Track & Field star and former Citytv personality
- Phil X - Session Guitarist
- Kiana Madeira - Actress

== See also ==
- Education in Ontario
- List of secondary schools in Ontario
