= Clearwater Academy International =

Private school in Clearwater, Florida, US

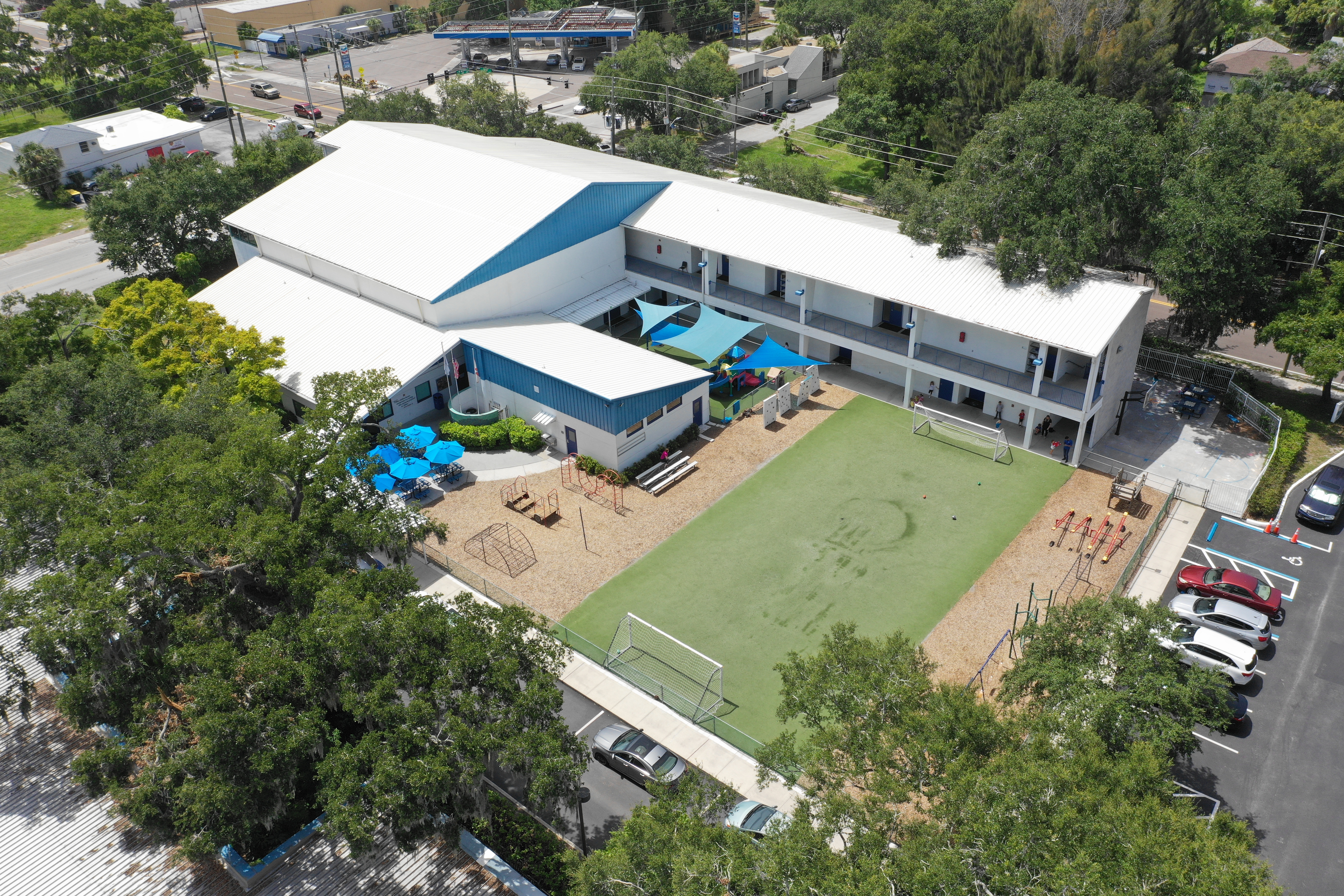

Location
- 801 Drew St; Clearwater, Florida; USA; 27°58′4″N 82°47′44″W

Information
- Type: Private School
- Grades: Pre-K to 12
- Gender: Co-educational
- Website: www.clearwateracademy.org

Clearwater Academy International is a Scientologist school located in Clearwater, Florida. The school serves grades Pre-K to 12 in a co-educational system. It was formed in 1997 after the merger of Jefferson Academy, A To Be School, and the Renaissance Academy.

The school is licensed by Applied Scholastics and uses the Study Technology by Scientology's founder L. Ron Hubbard. The school receives public funding through voucher and tax credit scholarship programs as per a 2017 Huffington Post investigation where it was disclosed the school received more than $500,000 in taxpayer money for student scholarships between 2012 and 2016.

Clearwater Academy's football team are called the Knights and they won the 8-man football championships in 2014 and 2015, and moved to 11-to-11 in 2016.

In 2017, students from the academy participated in Hurricane Harvey relief efforts in Texas.
