= 2026 Toronto Argonauts season =

CFL team season

- General manager: Michael Clemons
- Head coach: Mike Miller
- Home stadium: BMO Field

Results
- Record: 9–9
- Division place: 2nd, East
- Playoffs: Lost East Semi-Final
- Team MOP: Chad Kelly
- Team MODP: Adarius Pickett
- Team MOC: David Ungerer
- Team MOOL: Peter Nicastro
- Team MOST: Janarion Grant
- Team MOR: Tyler Kahmann

Uniform
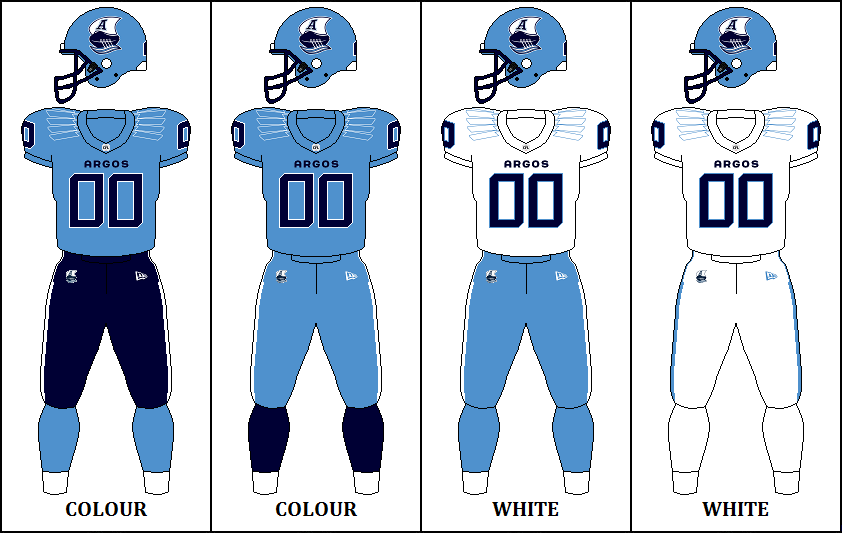

The 2026 Toronto Argonauts season was the 68th season for the team in the Canadian Football League (CFL) and their 153rd year of existence. The Argonauts improved upon their 5–13 record from 2025 and qualified for the playoffs following their week 14 victory over the Edmonton Elks. The team attempted to win the 20th Grey Cup championship in franchise history, but lost to the Winnipeg Blue Bombers 25–23 in the East Semi-Final. The Argonauts played three "home" games outside of Toronto due to the 2026 FIFA World Cup games being hosted by BMO Field from June 12, 2026, to July 2, 2026.

The 2026 CFL season was the first season for Mike Miller as head coach after former head coach Ryan Dinwiddie left to join the Ottawa Redblacks. This was the seventh season for Michael Clemons as general manager.

== Offseason ==
=== CFL Canadian draft ===
The 2026 CFL draft took place on April 28, 2026. The Argonauts had 11 selections in the eight-round draft after acquiring another second-round selection in the trade for Dejon Allen, another seventh-round selection in the trade for Mark Milton, and another fourth-round pick in the trade involving Daniel Adeboboye. Not including traded picks or forfeitures, the team selected second in each round of the draft, after finishing eighth in the 2025 league standings.

Round	Pick	Player	Position	School
1	2	Niklas Henning	OL	Queen's
2	11	Isaiah Smith	RB	Guelph
2	16	Ethan John	DB	Windsor
3	22	Louis-Philippe Gauthier	DB	Montreal
3	23	Darius McKenzie	LB	South Alabama
4	30	Nolan Ulm	WR	Eastern Washington
5	40	Frank Vreugdenhil	OL	McMaster
6	49	Tyriq Quayson	WR	Windsor
7	57	Nathan Walker	K/P	York
8	67	Weagbe Mombo	RB	Windsor
8	68	Sebastian Parsalidis	FB	Wilfrid Laurier

=== CFL global draft ===
The 2026 CFL global draft took place on April 29, 2026. The Argonauts had two selections in the draft, holding the second pick in each round.

Round	Pick	Player	Position	School	Nationality
1	2	Jordan Spasojevic-Moko	OL	California	Australia
2	11	Fa'alili Fa'amoe	OL	Wake Forest	American Samoa

== Stadium renovations ==
On March 3, 2025, it was announced that the team's home stadium, BMO Field, would be getting $150 million in renovations in advance of the 2026 FIFA World Cup games to be played there. This included new videoboards, an upgraded playing surface, and a 1,000-person rooftop patio. The capacity of the stadium would also temporarily be increased to 45,000.

== Preseason ==
The Argonauts' home preseason game was played at Alumni Stadium in Guelph, Ontario.

=== Schedule ===
Week	Game	Date	Kickoff	Opponent	Results		TV	Venue	Attendance	Summary
Week	Game	Date	Kickoff	Opponent	Score	Record	TV	Venue	Attendance	Summary
A	Bye									
B	1	Sat, May 23	4:00 p.m. EDT	at Hamilton Tiger-Cats	W 20–10	1–0	TSN/CFL+	Hamilton Stadium	N/A	Recap
C	2	Fri, May 29	7:00 p.m. EDT	vs. Hamilton Tiger-Cats	L 14–20	1–1	CFL+	Alumni Stadium	N/A	Recap

# Games played with white uniforms.

== Regular season ==
=== Standings ===
East Division
Team	GP	W	L	Pts	PF	PA	Div	Stk	
Montreal Alouettes	18	14	4	28	624	476	8–0	W1	Details
Toronto Argonauts	18	9	9	18	517	528	4–4	L3	Details
Hamilton Tiger-Cats	18	6	12	12	443	523	3–5	W1	Details
Ottawa Redblacks	18	1	17	2	437	673	1–7	L1	Details

=== Schedule ===
On August 15, 2025, it was announced that the Argonauts would play one "home" game in each of Hamilton Stadium against the Hamilton Tiger-Cats, Mosaic Stadium against the Saskatchewan Roughriders and Princess Auto Stadium against the Winnipeg Blue Bombers while the 2026 FIFA World Cup is being played. For record-keeping purposes, these three games were officially "away" games for the Argonauts. The team's remaining six home games were scheduled toward the second half of the season.

Week	Game	Date	Kickoff	Opponent	Results		TV	Venue	Attendance	Summary
Week	Game	Date	Kickoff	Opponent	Score	Record	TV	Venue	Attendance	Summary
1	Bye									
2	1	Fri, June 12	7:00 p.m. EDT	at Montreal Alouettes	L 30–37	0–1	TSN/RDS	Molson Stadium	21,106	Recap
3	2	Sat, June 20	1:00 p.m. EDT	at Ottawa Redblacks	W 44–24	1–1	TSN	TD Place Stadium	13,943	Recap
4	3	Fri, June 26	9:00 p.m. EDT	at Saskatchewan Roughriders	W 40–34	2–1	TSN/CBSSN	Mosaic Stadium	25,035	Recap
5	4	Thu, July 2	9:00 p.m. EDT	at Calgary Stampeders	L 36–58	2–2	TSN/CBSSN	McMahon Stadium	19,100	Recap
6	5	Fri, July 10	8:30 p.m. EDT	at Winnipeg Blue Bombers	L 21–30	2–3	TSN/RDS	Princess Auto Stadium	32,134	Recap
7	6	Sat, July 18	7:30 p.m. EDT	at Hamilton Tiger-Cats	L 23–24	2–4	TSN/CBSSN	Hamilton Stadium	21,262	Recap
8	7	Sat, July 25	7:00 p.m. EDT	at BC Lions	W 26–12	3–4	TSN/RDS2/CBSSN	BC Place	21,438	Recap
9	Bye									
10	8	Thu, Aug 6	7:30 p.m. EDT	vs. Calgary Stampeders	W 33–30	4–4	TSN/RDS	BMO Field	16,160	Recap
11	9	Sat, Aug 15	3:00 p.m. EDT	at Edmonton Elks	L 12–42	4–5	TSN/CTV	Commonwealth Stadium	22,583	Recap
12	10	Sat, Aug 22	7:00 p.m. EDT	vs. Hamilton Tiger-Cats	W 39–20	5–5	TSN/CBSSN	BMO Field	18,842	Recap
13	11	Sat, Aug 29	7:00 p.m. EDT	at Saskatchewan Roughriders	L 24–28	5–6	TSN	Mosaic Stadium	33,350	Recap
14	12	Mon, Sept 7	2:30 p.m. EDT	at Hamilton Tiger-Cats	W 37–22	6–6	TSN/RDS2/CBSSN	Hamilton Stadium	25,274	Recap
15	13	Sat, Sept 12	1:00 p.m. EDT	vs. Ottawa Redblacks	W 26–23	7–6	TSN/RDS	BMO Field	12,494	Recap
16	14	Sat, Sept 19	3:00 p.m. EDT	vs. Edmonton Elks	W 24–19	8–6	TSN/CTV	BMO Field	15,991	Recap
17	15	Fri, Sept 25	8:00 p.m. EDT	at Winnipeg Blue Bombers	W 30–28	9–6	TSN/RDS/CBSSN	Princess Auto Stadium	32,343	Recap
18	16	Sat, Oct 3	3:00 p.m. EDT	vs. BC Lions	L 17–24	9–7	TSN/CTV	BMO Field	13,974	Recap
19	Bye									
20	17	Fri, Oct 16	7:00 p.m. EDT	at Ottawa Redblacks	L 39–40	9–8	TSN	TD Place Stadium	16,371	Recap
21	18	Fri, Oct 23	7:00 p.m. EDT	vs. Montreal Alouettes	L 16–33	9–9	TSN/RDS	BMO Field	13,198	Recap

# Games played with colour uniforms.
# Games played with white uniforms.

== Post-season ==
=== Schedule ===
Game	Date	Kickoff	Opponent	Results		TV	Venue	Attendance	Summary
Game	Date	Kickoff	Opponent	Score	Record	TV	Venue	Attendance	Summary
East Semi-Final	Sat, Oct 31	1:00 p.m. EDT	vs. Winnipeg Blue Bombers	L 22–25	0–1	TSN/TSN2/CTV/RDS	BMO Field	21,786	Recap

# Games played with colour uniforms.

== Team ==
=== Roster ===
Toronto Argonauts roster
**Quarterbacks**: 4 Nick Arbuckle; 5 Tucker Horn; 12 Chad Kelly; **Receivers**: 86 Damonte Coxie; 3 Janarion Grant WR/KR; 82 Tyler Kahmann; 10 Kevin Mital; 15 Makai Polk; 81 Tristan Ready; 83 David Ungerer; **Running backs**: 38 Cam Porter; 21 Isaiah Smith; **Fullbacks**: 45 Jack Cassar; 41 Sebastian Parsalidis	**Offensive linemen**: 68 Desmond Bland; 62 Ryan Hunter; 67 Chris Kolankowski; 52 Peter Nicastro; 69 Kendall Randolph; 64 Dakoda Shepley; 56 Frank Vreugdenhil; **Defensive linemen**: 97 Dewayne Hendrix; 99 Ralph Holley; 98 Da'Marcus Johnson; 95 Jonathan Kongbo; 42 Shawn Lemon; 92 Paris Shand; 91 Soane Toia	**Linebackers**: 35 Isaac Darkangelo; 26 Brian Harelimana; 49 Jordan Herdman-Reed; 46 Vi Jones; 40 Darius McKenzie; 33 Alexander Teubner; **Defensive backs**: 1 DaShaun Amos; 34 Bubba Bolden; 28 James Ceasar; 37 Dathan Hickey; 23 Benjie Franklin; 9 Louis-Philippe Gauthier; 24 Ethan John; 6 Adarius Pickett; **Special teams**: 14 James Burnip P; 47 Adam Guillemette LS; 70 Lirim Hajrullahu K	**Reserve**: 61 Brandon Kemp OL; 0 Dymere Miller WR; **1-game injured**: 76 Ali Fayad DL; 87 Jake Herslow WR; 20 Derek Slywka DB; 17 Nolan Ulm WR; **6-game injured**: 94 Andrew Chatfield DL; 27 Owen Goss LB; 8 Cameron Judge LB; 2 Tarvarus McFadden DB; 44 Jeremiah Ojo DL; 11 Robert Priester DB; 63 Rush Reimer OL	**Practice roster**: 36 Akili Arnold DB; 93 Jalen Bell DL; 84 Michael Buckley WR; 96 Jason Compoh DL; 13 Solomon Davis WR; 90 Denzel Daxon DL; 29 John Haggerty P; 25 Samuel Hicks RB; 7 Qualan Jones RB; 79 Gabriel Maisonneuve DL; 32 James Neal LB; 16 Luis Perez QB; 66 Domenico Piazza OL; 30 Jalen Rayam LB; 43 Nic Toomer DB; **Suspended**: 14 Delonte Hood DB; -- Keenan Isaac DB; 56 George Moore OL
Italics indicate American player • **Bold** indicates Global player • 45 Active, 2 Reserve, 15 Practice, 11 Injured, 3 Suspended; Roster updated 2026-10-30 • Depth chart • Transactions • More CFL rosters

=== Coaching staff ===
Toronto Argonauts staff
**Front office and support staff**: Owner – Maple Leaf Sports & Entertainment; President – Vacant; General manager – Michael Clemons; Director, Player Personnel – Jim Barker; Senior Advisor – John Hufnagel; Director, Football Operations – Melissa Firth; Pro Scout Coordinator – Afram Jolak; Pro and Canadian Scouting Assistant – Nate Bickford; Head Athletic Therapist – Josh Shewell; Assistant Athletic Therapist – Mark Belmore; Equipment Manager – Danny Webb; Assistant Equipment Manager – David Sillberg; Strength and Conditioning – Usama Mujtaba; Manager, Football Media – Chris Balenovich; Manager, Communications – Mike Hogan	**Head coaches**: Head Coach – Mike Miller; Assistant Head Coach – Demetrious Maxie; **Offensive coaches**: Offensive coordinator – Mike Miller; Quarterbacks – Chris Miller; Receivers – Kierrie Johnson; Offensive Line – Dominic Picard; Running backs – Ka'Deem Carey; Assistant Offensive Line and Quality Control – Colyn Haugh; **Defensive coaches**: Defensive Coordinator and Linebackers – Greg Quick; Defensive Backs – Jovon Johnson; Defensive Line – Demetrious Maxie; Assistant Linebackers and Quality Control – Bubba Walker; **Special teams coaches**: Special Teams Coordinator – Mickey Donovan; → Coaching Staff → More CFL staffs
