= List of Toronto Argonauts starting quarterbacks =

The following is an incomplete list of starting quarterbacks for the Toronto Argonauts of the Canadian Football League that have started a regular season game for the team. This list includes postseason appearances since 1990, but does not include preseason games. They are listed in order of most starts with any tiebreaker being the date of each player's first start at quarterback for the Argonauts.

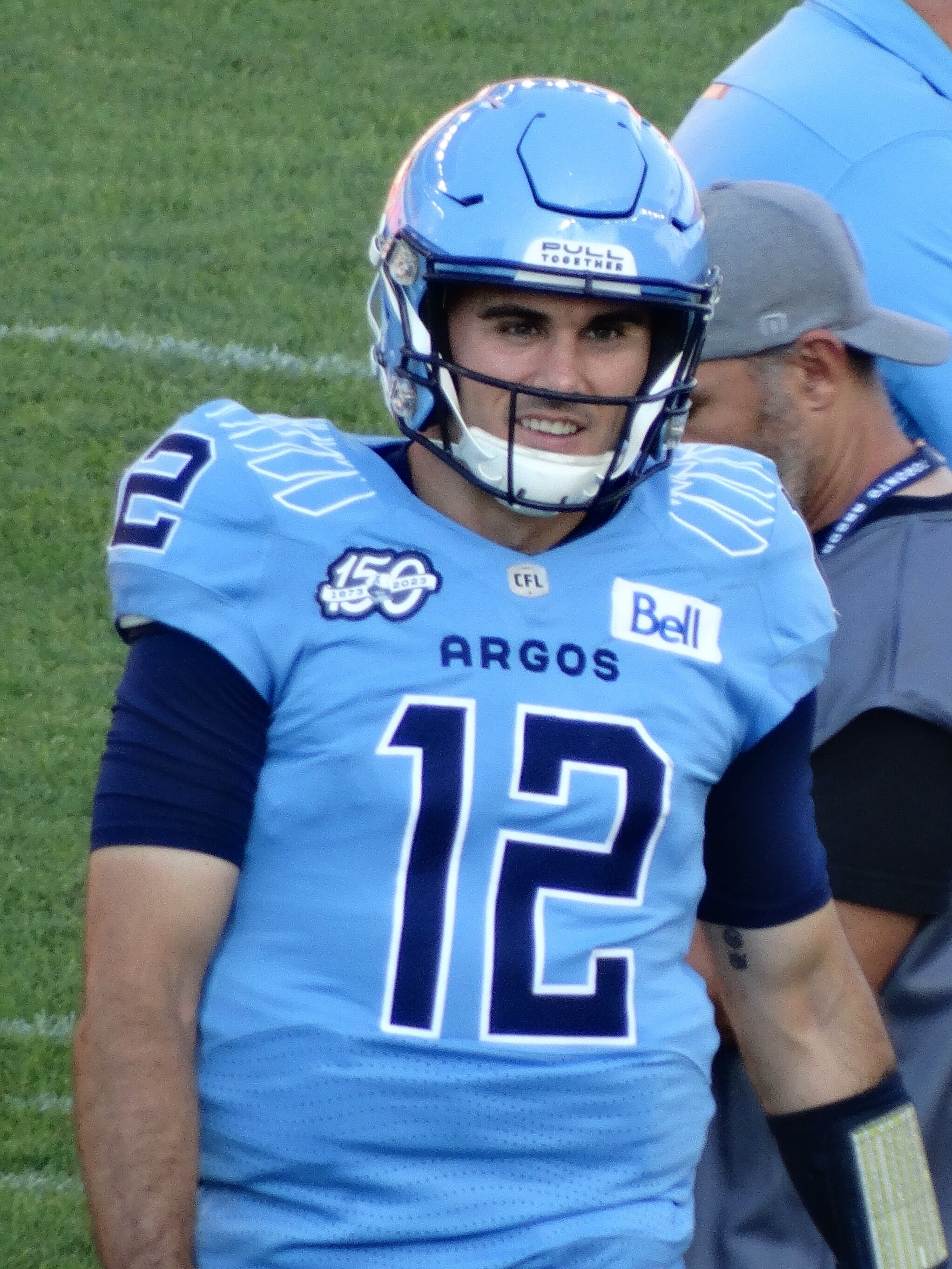
Chad Kelly is the most recent Argonauts' quarterback to win the CFL's Most Outstanding Player Award.

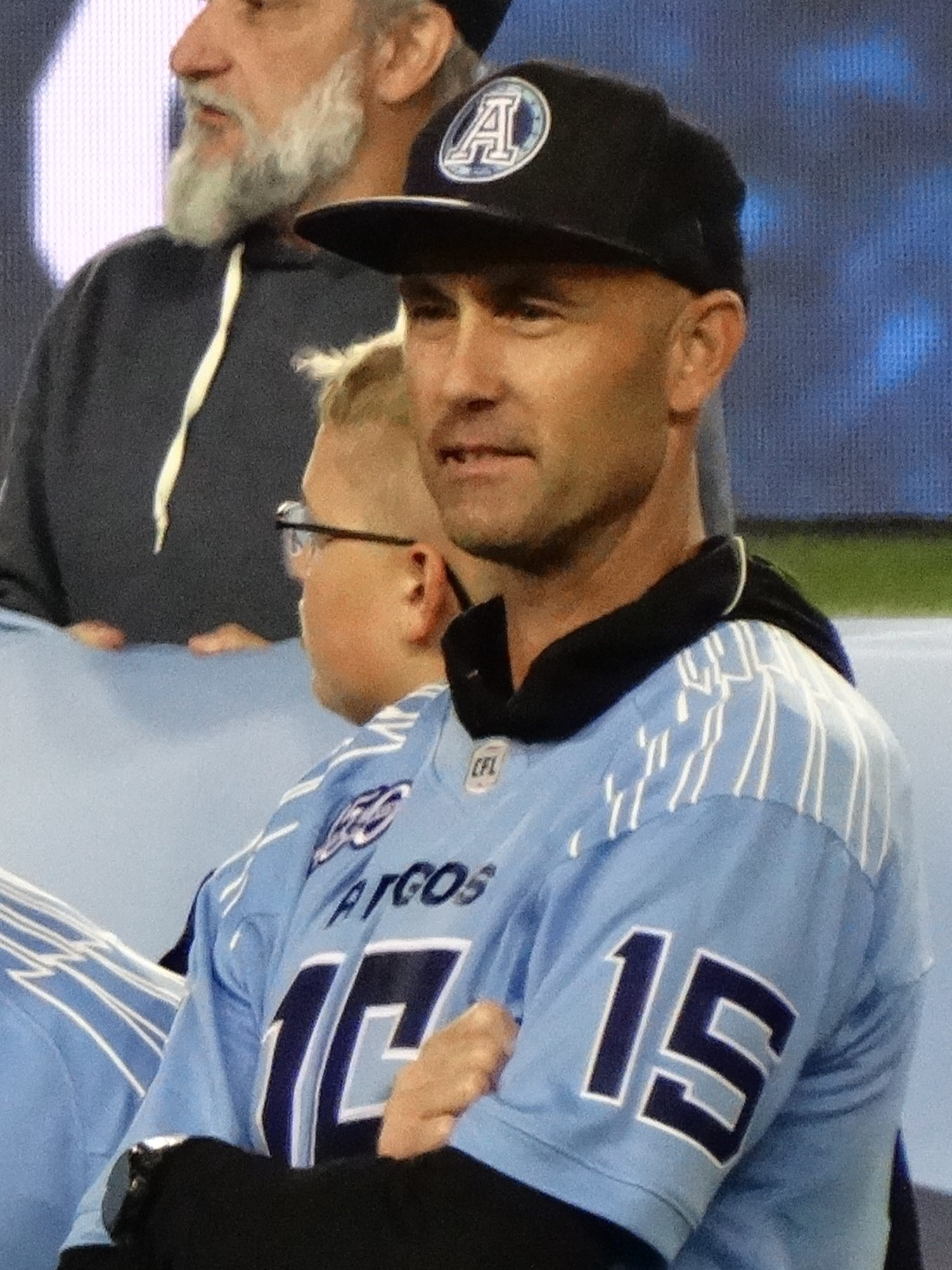
Ricky Ray is the Argonauts' all-time leader in passing yards, completions, and touchdowns.

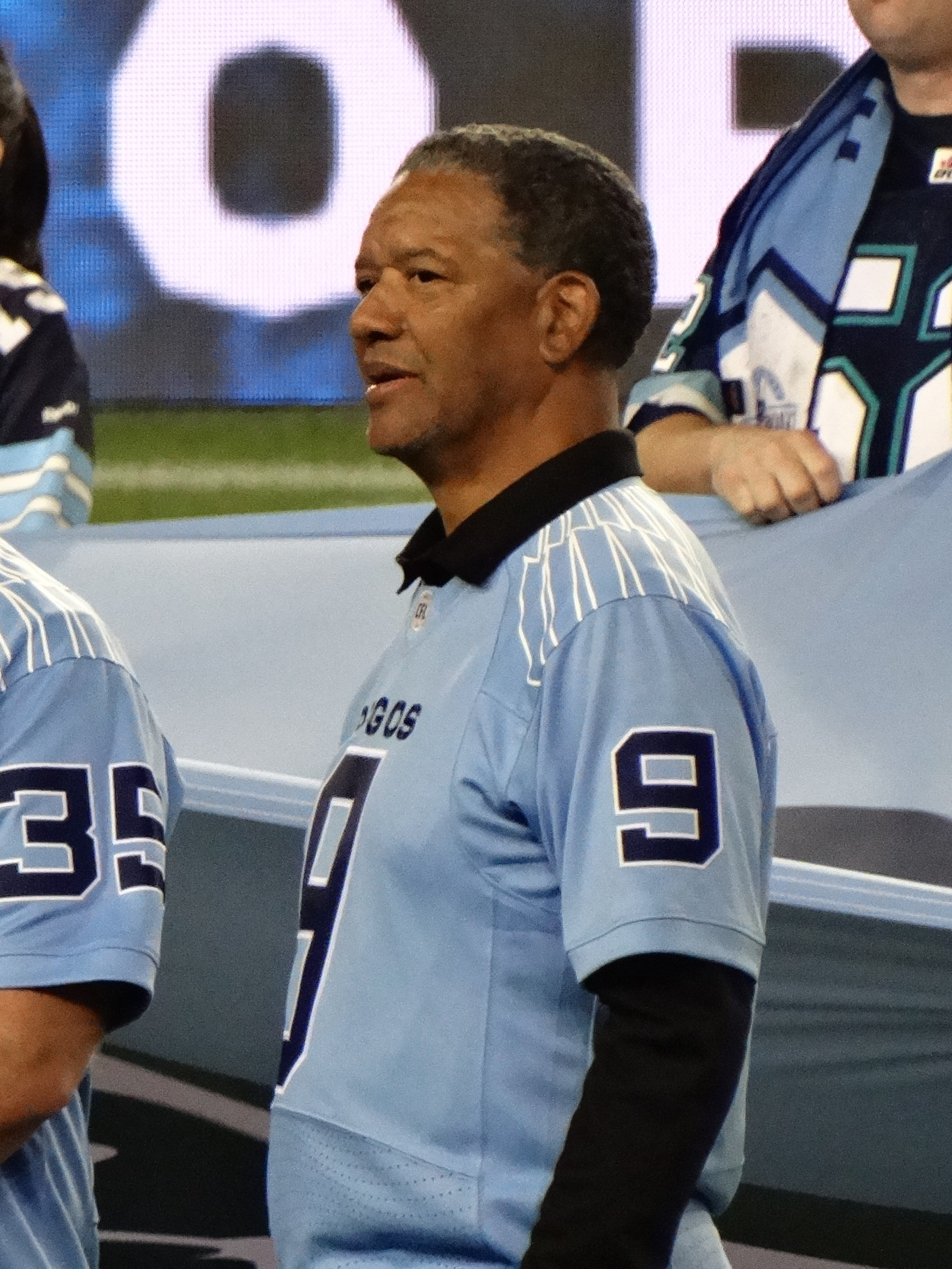
Damon Allen won the CFL's Most Outstanding Player Award in 2005 and the 92nd Grey Cup.

== Starting quarterbacks by season ==
Where known, the number of games they started during the season is listed to the right:

Season(s)	Regular season	Postseason
2026	Chad Kelly (16) / Nick Arbuckle (1) / Tucker Horn (1)	Chad Kelly (1)
2025	Nick Arbuckle (15) / Jarret Doege (3)	
2024	Cameron Dukes (9) / Nick Arbuckle (1) / Chad Kelly (8)	Chad Kelly (2) / Nick Arbuckle (1)
2023	Chad Kelly (16) / Cameron Dukes (2)	Chad Kelly (1)
2022	McLeod Bethel-Thompson (17) / Chad Kelly (1)	McLeod Bethel-Thompson (2)
2021	McLeod Bethel-Thompson (9) / Nick Arbuckle (4) / Antonio Pipkin (1)	McLeod Bethel-Thompson (1)
2020	Season cancelled due to COVID-19 pandemic	
2019	McLeod Bethel-Thompson (13) / James Franklin (4) / Dakota Prukop (1)	
2018	James Franklin (8) / McLeod Bethel-Thompson (8) / Ricky Ray (2)	
2017	Ricky Ray (17) / Jeff Mathews (1)	Ricky Ray (2)
2016	Ricky Ray (9) / Logan Kilgore (3) / Dan LeFevour (3) / Drew Willy (3)	
2015	Trevor Harris (16) / Ricky Ray (2)	Ricky Ray (1)
2014	Ricky Ray (17) / Trevor Harris (1)	
2013	Ricky Ray (10) / Zach Collaros (8)	Ricky Ray (1)
2012	Ricky Ray (14) / Jarious Jackson (4)	Ricky Ray (3)
2011	Cleo Lemon (8) / Steven Jyles (8) / Dalton Bell (2)	
2010	Cleo Lemon (17) / Dalton Bell (1)	Cleo Lemon (1)
2009	Kerry Joseph (10) / Cody Pickett (7) / Stephen Reaves (1)	
2008	Kerry Joseph (16) / Cody Pickett (2)	
2007	Michael Bishop (12) / Damon Allen (2) / Mike McMahon (2) / Ian Butler (2)	Michael Bishop (1)
2006	Damon Allen (14) / Spergon Wynn (4)	Damon Allen (2)
2005	Damon Allen (17) / Michael Bishop (1)	Damon Allen (1)
2004	Damon Allen (9) / Michael Bishop (9)	Damon Allen (3)
2003	Damon Allen (15) / Marcus Brady (3)	Damon Allen (2)
2002	Reggie Slack (7) / Michael Bishop (5) / Jim Ballard (4) / Stanley Jackson (2)	Reggie Slack (2)
2001	Kerwin Bell (9) / Jimmy Kemp (9)	
2000	Kerwin Bell (9) / Jimmy Kemp (7) / Jay Barker (1) / Oteman Sampson (1)	
1999	Jay Barker (11) / Jimmy Kemp (7)	Jay Barker (1)
1998	Kerwin Bell (14) / Jay Barker (4)	Kerwin Bell (1)
1997	Doug Flutie (18)	Doug Flutie (2)
1996	Doug Flutie (18)	Doug Flutie (2)
1995	Kent Austin (13) / Marvin Graves (3) / Erik White (2)	
1994	Mike Kerrigan (8) / Marvin Graves (7) / Reggie Slack (2) / Erik White (1)	Marvin Graves (1)
1993	Tracy Ham (10) / Reggie Slack (5) / Mike Kerrigan (3)	
1992	Rickey Foggie (16) / John Congemi (2)	
1991	Rickey Foggie (11) / Matt Dunigan (7)	Matt Dunigan (2)
1990	Matt Dunigan (7) / John Congemi (5) / Rickey Foggie (4) / Tom Porras (2)	Rickey Foggie (1) / John Congemi (1)
1989	Gilbert Renfroe (8) / John Congemi (7) / Rick Johnson (3)	
1988	Gilbert Renfroe (18)	
1987	Danny Barrett (8) / Gilbert Renfroe (7) / John Congemi (3)	

- * - Indicates that the number of starts is not known for that year for each quarterback

== Team passer rankings ==
Quarterbacks are listed by number of starts for the Argonauts.

Name	GS	W–L–T	Comp	Att	Pct	Yards	TD	Int
Ricky Ray	71	33–38–0	1,757	2,476	71.0	20,205	114	47
Condredge Holloway	68	38–30–0	1,149	1,988	57.8	16,619	98	55
Damon Allen	55	33–22–0	1,051	1,713	61.4	13,974	77	40
McLeod Bethel-Thompson	47	24–23–0	1,125	1,683	66.8	13,261	70	49
Chad Kelly	41	29–12–0	837	1,213	69.0	11,398	68	47
Wally Gabler	41	18–22–1	532	1,046	50.9	8,400	41	67
Tobin Rote	40	21–18–1	663	1,187	55.9	9,872	66	58
Chuck Ealey	40	15–24–1	414	759	54.5	5,426	30	29
Doug Flutie	36	30–6–0	864	1,350	64.0	11,125	76	41
Gilbert Renfroe	33	21–12–0	520	1,008	51.6	7,134	36	41
