= Mike Miller (gridiron football coach, born 1970) =

American gridiron football coach (born 1970)

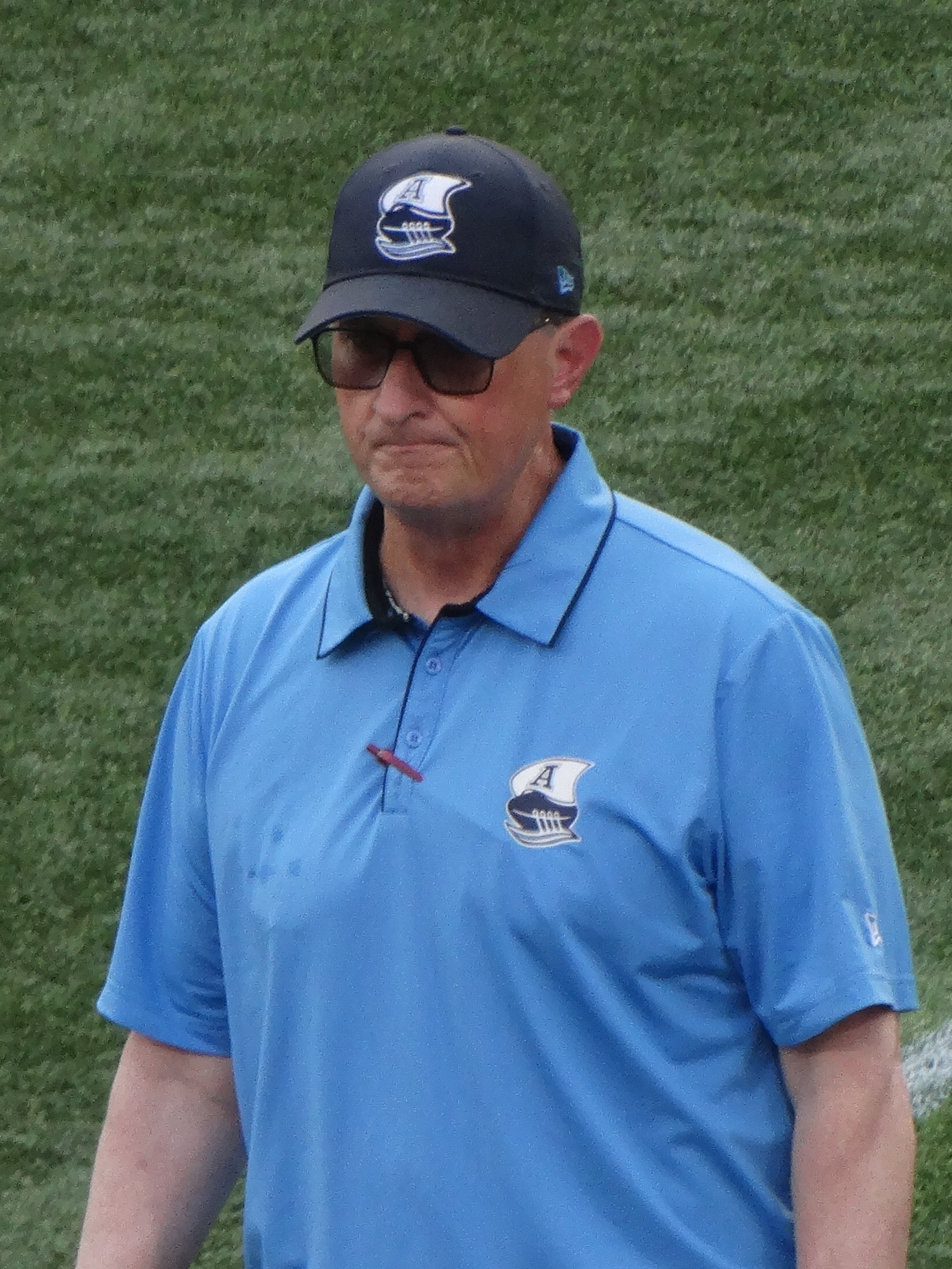
- Miller with the Toronto Argonauts in 2026

Toronto Argonauts
- Title: Head coach

Personal information
- Born: April 9, 1970 (age 56); Pittsburgh, Pennsylvania, U.S.

Career information
- College: Clarion

Career history
- Robert Morris (1997–1998) Graduate assistant & running backs coach; Pittsburgh Steelers (1999–2003) Offensive quality control coach; Buffalo Bills (2004) Tight ends/quality control coach; Buffalo Bills (2005) Tight ends coach; Berlin Thunder (2006) Quarterbacks coach & wide receivers coach; Robert Morris (2006) Defensive line coach; Arizona Cardinals (2007–2008) Wide receivers coach; Arizona Cardinals (2009–2010) Passing game coordinator; Arizona Cardinals (2011–2012) Offensive coordinator; Montreal Alouettes (2013) Assistant head coach/offensive coordinator & quarterbacks coach; Edinboro (2014) Offensive coordinator/quarterbacks coach & receivers coach; Robert Morris (2016–2017) Offensive coordinator & quarterbacks coach; Westminster (PA) (2018) Defensive coordinator & defensive line coach; Westminster (PA) (2019) Offensive consultant & assistant offensive line coach; New York Guardians (2020) Wide receivers coach; Toronto Argonauts (2022–2025) Quarterbacks coach; Toronto Argonauts (2026–present) Head coach

Awards and highlights
- 2× Grey Cup champion (2022, 2024)
- Coaching profile at Pro Football Reference

Mike Miller (born April 9, 1970) is an American football coach who is the head coach of the Toronto Argonauts of the Canadian Football League (CFL). He also coached in the National Football League (NFL) from 1999 to 2005 and from 2007 to 2012. He was the offensive coordinator of the Arizona Cardinals from 2011 to 2012.

== Early life ==
Miller graduated in 1988 from Plum High School in Plum, Pennsylvania, a suburb of Pittsburgh. He also earned a bachelor's degree in communications from Clarion University of Pennsylvania and a master's degree in education from Robert Morris University.

== Coaching career ==
Miller's first exposure to the professional sports scene was as a public relations intern. He held internships with the Pittsburgh Penguins, Pittsburgh Steelers and Indianapolis Colts. During this time, he also helped the scouting department and learned the inner workings of the coaching profession. He gained valuable experience in his first coaching opportunity as a running backs coach and graduate assistant at Robert Morris University where he coached under veteran NFL coaches Joe Walton and Dan Radakovich.

In 1999, Bill Cowher offered Miller his first professional coaching position as an offensive quality control coach with the Pittsburgh Steelers At this position, Miller worked closely with offensive coordinator Mike Mularkey. When Mularkey was hired as head coach for the Buffalo Bills, Miller was offered a position on his staff as tight ends and quality control Coach in 2004 and 2005. Following Mularkey's dismissal, Miller landed a coaching job with the Berlin Thunder of NFL Europa in 2006.

In 2007, Ken Whisenhunt was named as head coach of the Arizona Cardinals and offered Miller a position on his staff. Like Mularkey, Whisenhunt first worked with Miller on the Steelers coaching staff. Miller spent the 2007 and 2008 seasons as the wide receivers coach. In 2008, his top two receivers Larry Fitzgerald and Anquan Boldin were named to the Pro Bowl. Also in 2008, Fitzgerald, Boldin and Steve Breaston each gained over 1000 receiving yards, a feat only accomplished five times in NFL history. Miller was promoted to Arizona's pass game coordinator (2009–2010) and offensive coordinator (2011–2012). Miller helped the team reach Super Bowl XLIII in 2009.

Miller joined the Montreal Alouettes of the Canadian Football League in 2013 as the assistant head coach, offensive coordinator, and quarterbacks coach under the new head coach Dan Hawkins. The Alouettes were the first offense in CFL history to have four starting quarterbacks each record two wins in a season.

In 2014, Miller became the offensive coordinator, quarterbacks coach, and receivers coach for Edinboro University of Pennsylvania. Edinboro's offense led the country with 80% completion percentage and set single season reception record.

Following a two-year stint as offensive coordinator and quarterbacks coach at Robert Morris (2016–2017), Miller served in 2018 as defensive coordinator and defensive line coach Westminster College in New Wilmington, Pennsylvania. In 2019, Miller moved to a part-time role as Westminster's offensive consultant and assistant offensive line coach having accepted the receivers coaching position with the New York Guardians of the XFL.

On January 19, 2022, it was announced that Miller had joined the Toronto Argonauts as the team's quarterbacks coach, overseeing veteran starter McLeod Bethel-Thompson and backup quarterbacks Chad Kelly and Ben Holmes. Under Miller, Bethel-Thompson threw for a CFL-high 4,731 passing yards during the regular CFL season and helped lead the Argos to an upset victory over the Winnipeg Blue Bombers in the 109th Grey Cup. Backup Kelly was also critical in helping lead the Argos to the championship win by stepping in for the injured Bethel-Thompson in the fourth quarter to lead the Argo's on their game winning scoring drive. The following year, Miller coached Kelly to become the CFL's MOP and have a record breaking season, tying the all-time win record in CFL history. In 2024, he worked with three different starting quarterbacks as the team finished 10–8 and won the 111th Grey Cup. Backup quarterback, Nick Arbuckle, started the Grey Cup and was named MVP. During the 2022 and 2023 Argonaut training camps, Miller developed Canadian university quarterback, Taylor Elgersma. Elgersma won the 2024 Hec Crighton Trophy in 2024 as U Sports football's most outstanding player. In 2025, Elgersma became the first Canadian university quarterback invited to the NFL's Senior Bowl.

On December 2, 2025, it was announced that Miller had been named head coach of the Argonauts, the 46th in franchise history.

== Head coaching record ==
Team	Year	Regular season					Postseason		
Team	Year	Won	Lost	Ties	Win %	Finish	Won	Lost	Result
TOR	2026	9	9	0	.500	2nd in East Division	0	1	Lost in Division Semi-Finals
Total		9	9	0	.500	0 Division Championships	0	1	
