= Isaiah Smith =

Canadian gridiron football player (born 2003)

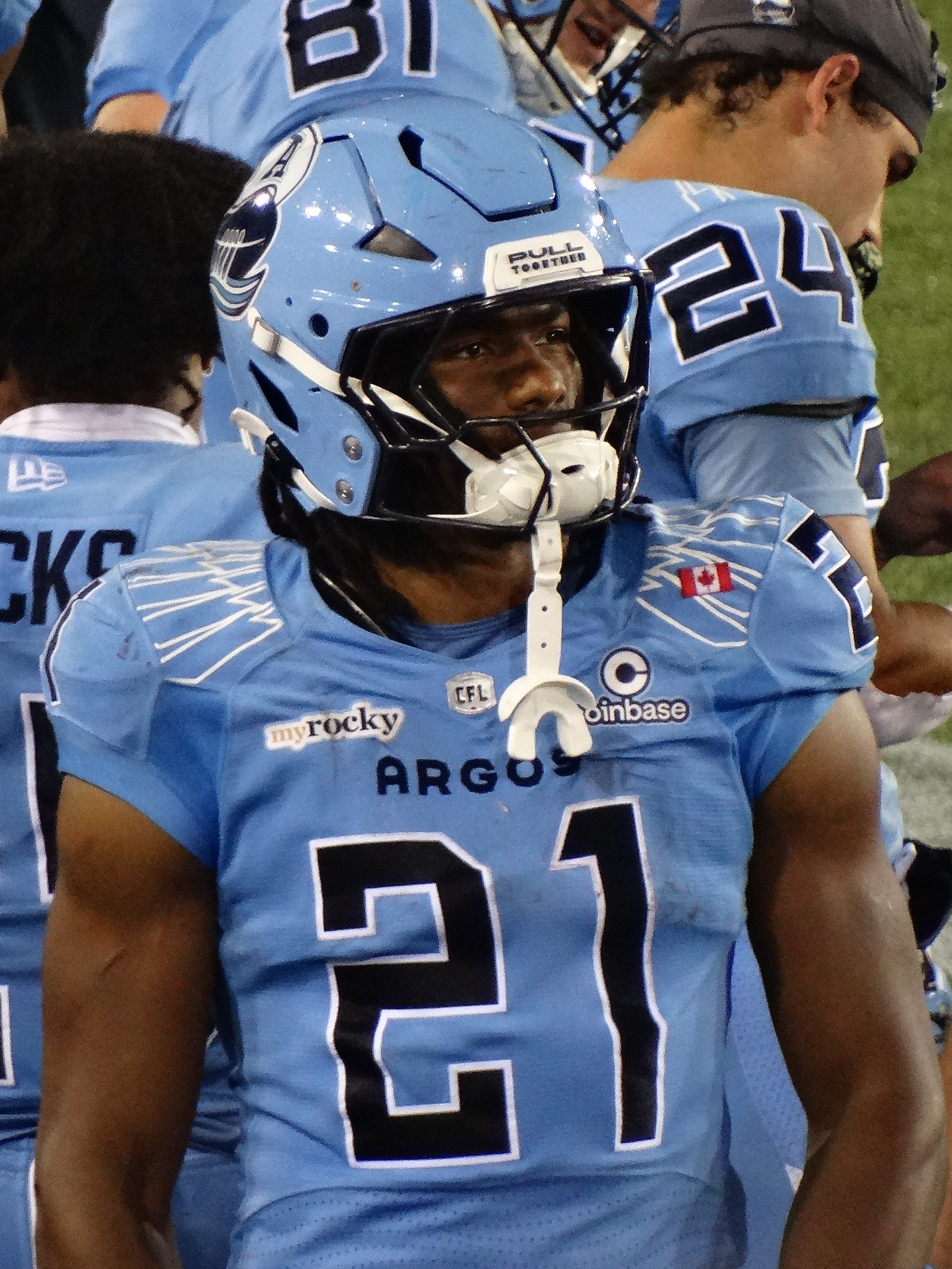
- Smith with the Toronto Argonauts in 2026

No. 21 – Toronto Argonauts
- Position: Running back
- Roster status: Active
- CFL status: National

Personal information
- Born: August 6, 2003 (age 23); Burlington, Ontario, Canada
- Listed height: 6 ft 0 in (1.83 m)
- Listed weight: 230 lb (104 kg)

Career information
- High school: Aldershot
- CJFL: Hamilton Hurricanes
- University: Guelph
- CFL draft: 2026: 2nd round, 11th overall pick

Career history
- Toronto Argonauts (2026–present)
- Stats at CFL.ca

Isaiah Smith (born August 6, 2003) is a Canadian professional football running back for the Toronto Argonauts of the Canadian Football League (CFL).

== Junior career ==
Smith first played in the Canadian Junior Football League (CJFL) for the Hamilton Hurricanes in 2021. He played in one game where he had 80 rushing yards, but injured his wrist and did not play again that year.

== University career ==
Smith played U Sports football for the Guelph Gryphons from 2022 to 2025. He was named the OUA Rookie of the Year in 2022 after finishing eighth in the OUA in rushing yards with 495 while also scoring three touchdowns. He played in 24 games over four seasons where he had 173 carries for 1,060 yards with seven rushing touchdowns and 41 receptions for 469 yards and two receiving touchdowns.

== Professional career ==
Smith was drafted in the second round, 11th overall, in the 2026 CFL draft by the Toronto Argonauts and signed with the team on May 10, 2022. Following training camp, he made the team's active roster as the backup running back to Samuel Hicks and played in his first professional game on June 12, 2026, against the Montreal Alouettes, where he had one catch for 35 yards.
