= Ethan John =

American gridiron football player (born 2001)

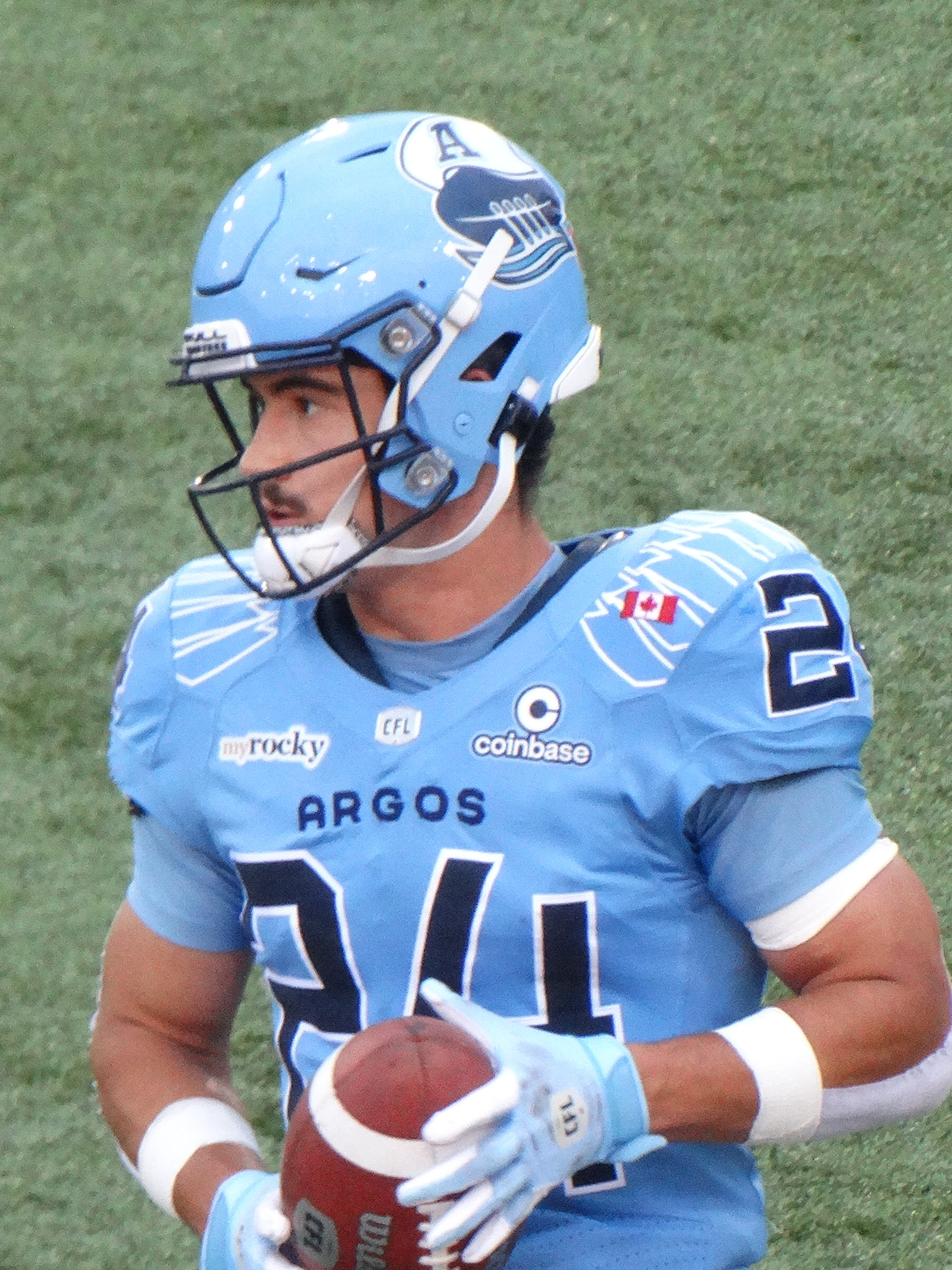
- John with the Toronto Argonauts in 2026

No. 24 – Toronto Argonauts
- Position: Defensive back
- Roster status: Active
- CFL status: National

Personal information
- Born: December 7, 2001 (age 24); Felton, Minnesota, U.S.
- Listed height: 5 ft 9 in (1.75 m)
- Listed weight: 189 lb (86 kg)

Career information
- High school: Dilworth-Glyndon-Felton High
- University: Windsor
- CFL draft: 2026: 2nd round, 16th overall pick

Career history
- 2026–present: Toronto Argonauts

Career CFL statistics
- Total tackles: 7
- Stats at CFL.ca

Ethan John (born December 7, 2001) is an American professional football defensive back for the Toronto Argonauts of the Canadian Football League (CFL).

== University career ==
John attended Concordia College in 2020 with the intention of playing baseball, but the season was cancelled due to the COVID-19 pandemic. He then transferred to the North Dakota State College of Science in 2021 where he played in nine games for Wildcats where he recorded 29 tackles. He attended Southwest Minnesota State University in the spring of 2022 and then transferred again to Antelope Valley College where he played in 10 games for the Marauders where he had 46 tackles and one interception.

John transferred to the University of Windsor in 2023 where he played U Sports football for the Lancers. In three seasons, he played in 29 games where he had 197 tackles, 11 tackles for loss, 10 pass knockdowns, one interception, and one fumble recovery. After playing in three seasons in U Sports, John qualified as a National player and was eligible for the CFL draft.

== Professional career ==
John was selected by the Toronto Argonauts in the second round, 16th overall, in the 2026 CFL draft and signed with the team on May 1, 2026. He made the active roster following training camp and played in his first CFL game on June 12, 2026, against the Montreal Alouettes. John later made his first career start at safety on July 10, 2026, against the Winnipeg Blue Bombers where he recorded three defensive tackles.
