= Sebastian Parsalidis =

Canadian gridiron football player (born 2003)

- Parsalidis with the Toronto Argonauts in 2026

No. 41 – Toronto Argonauts
- Position: Fullback
- Roster status: Active
- CFL status: National

Personal information
- Born: June 9, 2003 (age 23); Toronto, Ontario, Canada
- Listed height: 5 ft 9 in (1.75 m)
- Listed weight: 224 lb (102 kg)

Career information
- High school: Chaminade College (Toronto)
- University: Wilfrid Laurier (2023–2025)
- CFL draft: 2026: 8th round, 68th overall pick

Career history
- Toronto Argonauts (2026–present)

Awards and highlights
- Second-team All-Canadian (2024); 2× OUA First-team All-Star (2024, 2025); OUA second-team All-Star (2023)

Career CFL statistics as of 2026
- Receptions: 2
- Receiving yards: 22
- Total tackles: 6
- Stats at CFL.ca

Sebastian Parsalidis (born June 9, 2003) is a Canadian professional football fullback for the Toronto Argonauts of the Canadian Football League (CFL). He played U Sports football for the Wilfrid Laurier Golden Hawks.

== University career ==
Parsalidis played U Sports football for the Wilfrid Laurier Golden Hawks from 2023 to 2025. He played in 30 games, starting in two and caught nine passes for 72 yards and one touchdown. Parsalidis also registered nine tackles, including one for loss, three forced fumbles, one fumble recovery, and two blocked kicks. He was a three-time OUA All-Star and earned second-team All-Canadian honors in 2024 as utility.

== Professional career ==
Pre-draft measurables
Height	Weight	40-yard dash	20-yard shuttle	Vertical jump	Broad jump	Bench press
5 ft 8 3/4 in (1.75 m)	224 lb (102 kg)	4.89 s	4.57 s	35 in (0.89 m)	9 ft 0 in (2.74 m)	29 reps
All values from CFL Combine

Parsalidis was selected by the Toronto Argonauts with the 68th overall pick in the eighth round of the 2026 CFL draft. On May 4, he officially signed with the team. He played in all 18 regular season games where he had two catches for 22 yards and six special teams tackles.
