= Louis-Philippe Gauthier (Canadian football) =

Canadian gridiron football player (born 2002)

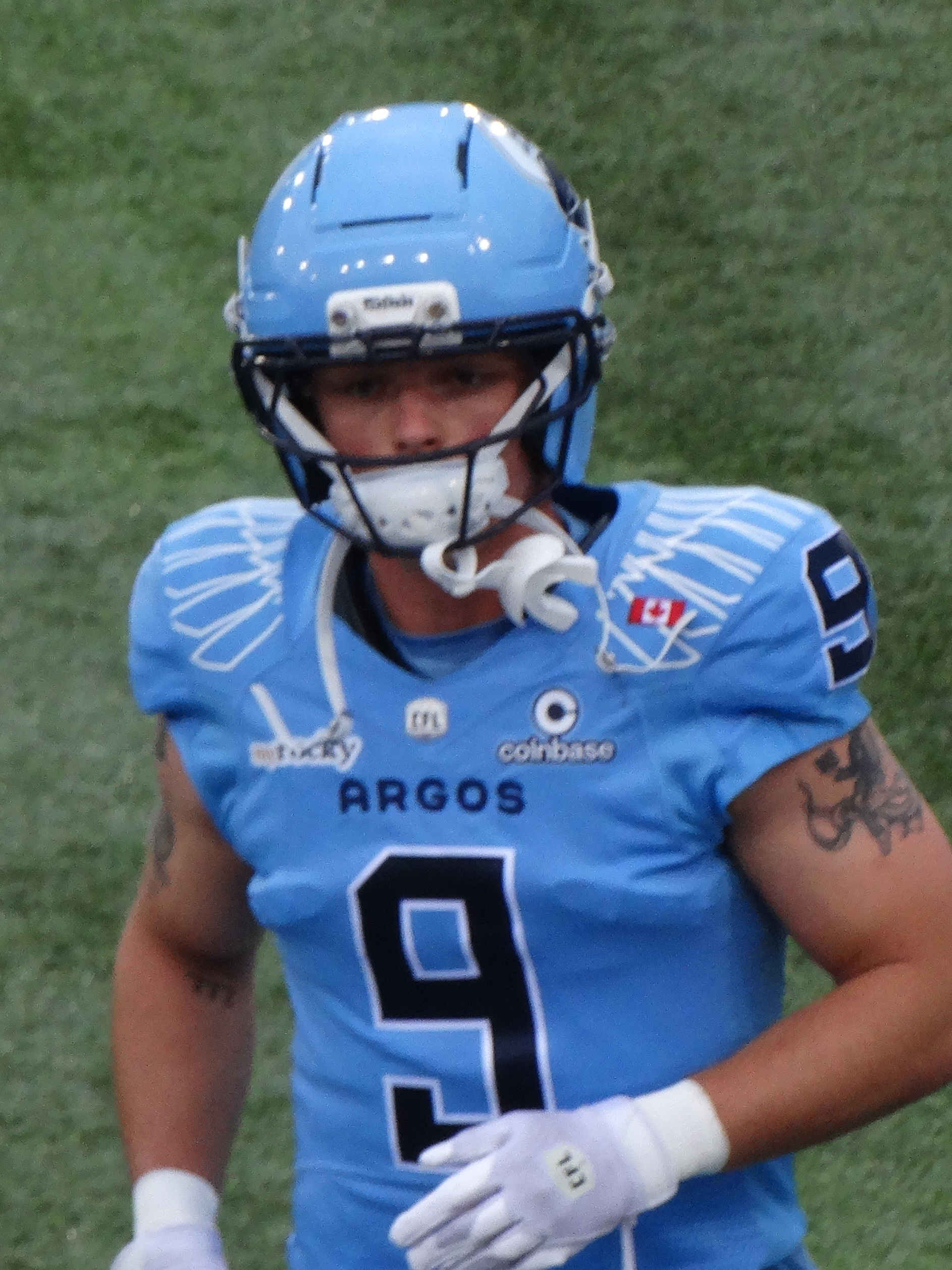
- Gauthier with the Toronto Argonauts in 2026

No. 9 – Toronto Argonauts
- Position: Defensive back
- Roster status: Active
- CFL status: National

Personal information
- Born: April 7, 2002 (age 24); Montreal, Quebec, Canada
- Listed height: 6 ft 0 in (1.83 m)
- Listed weight: 202 lb (92 kg)

Career information
- University: Montreal
- CFL draft: 2026: 3rd round, 22nd overall pick

Career history
- 2026–present: Toronto Argonauts

Awards and highlights
- Vanier Cup champion (2025); Bruce Coulter Award (2025); Vanier Cup champion (2023); RSEQ All-Star Team (2025)
- Stats at CFL.ca

Louis-Philippe Gauthier (born April 7, 2002) is a Canadian professional football defensive back for the Toronto Argonauts of the Canadian Football League (CFL).

== University career ==
Gauthier played U Sports football for the Montreal Carabins from 2022 to 2025. In four seasons, he played in 33 games where he had 84 tackles, 10 pass knockdowns, eight interceptions — seven of which have come in playoff games, and three forced fumbles. He finished his U Sports career with a championship after the Carabins won the 60th Vanier Cup where Gauthier won the Bruce Coulter Award as the top defensive player in the game after recording six tackles and an interception.

== Professional career ==
Gauthier was selected by the Toronto Argonauts in the third round, 22nd overall, in the 2026 CFL draft and signed with the team on May 4, 2026. He made the active roster following training camp and played in his first CFL game on June 12, 2026, against his hometown Montreal Alouettes in Montreal.
