= Owen Goss =

American gridiron football player (born 2001)

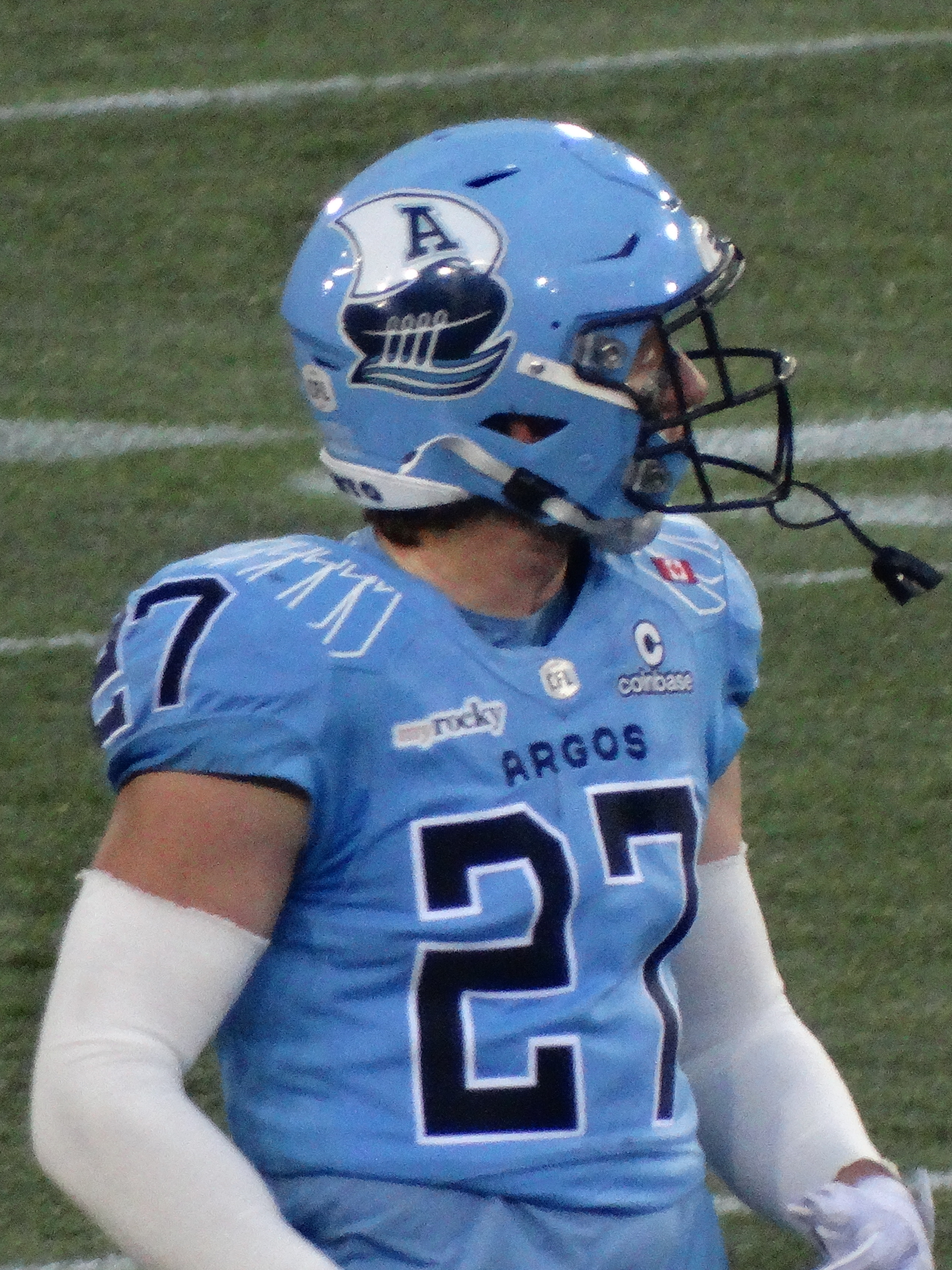
- Goss with the Toronto Argonauts in 2026

No. 27 – Toronto Argonauts
- Position: Defensive back
- Roster status: Active
- CFL status: American

Personal information
- Born: August 5, 2001 (age 25); Hinsdale, Illinois, U.S.
- Listed height: 6 ft 0 in (1.83 m)
- Listed weight: 202 lb (92 kg)

Career information
- High school: Hinsdale Central High
- College: Colgate (2020–2023); Arizona (2024)

Career history
- 2026–present: Toronto Argonauts
- Stats at CFL.ca

Owen Fogerty Goss (born August 5, 2001) is an American professional football defensive back for the Toronto Argonauts of the Canadian Football League (CFL).

== College career ==
Goss first played college football for the Colgate Raiders from 2020 to 2023. He then transferred to the University of Arizona to play for the Wildcats in 2024. He played in 11 games for the Wildcats where he recorded 52 tackles, one sack, three forced fumbles, and two fumble recoveries.

== Professional career ==
Goss signed with the Toronto Argonauts on January 26, 2026. He made the active roster following training camp and played in his first CFL game on June 12, 2026, against the Montreal Alouettes where he recorded one forced fumble. Following an injury to Cameron Judge, Goss earned his first career start at weakside linebacker on July 10, 2026, against the Winnipeg Blue Bombers, where he had four defensive tackles and one sack.

== Personal life ==
Goss was born to parents Amy and Brian Goss and has three brothers.
