= Samuel Hicks =

American gridiron football player (born 2000)

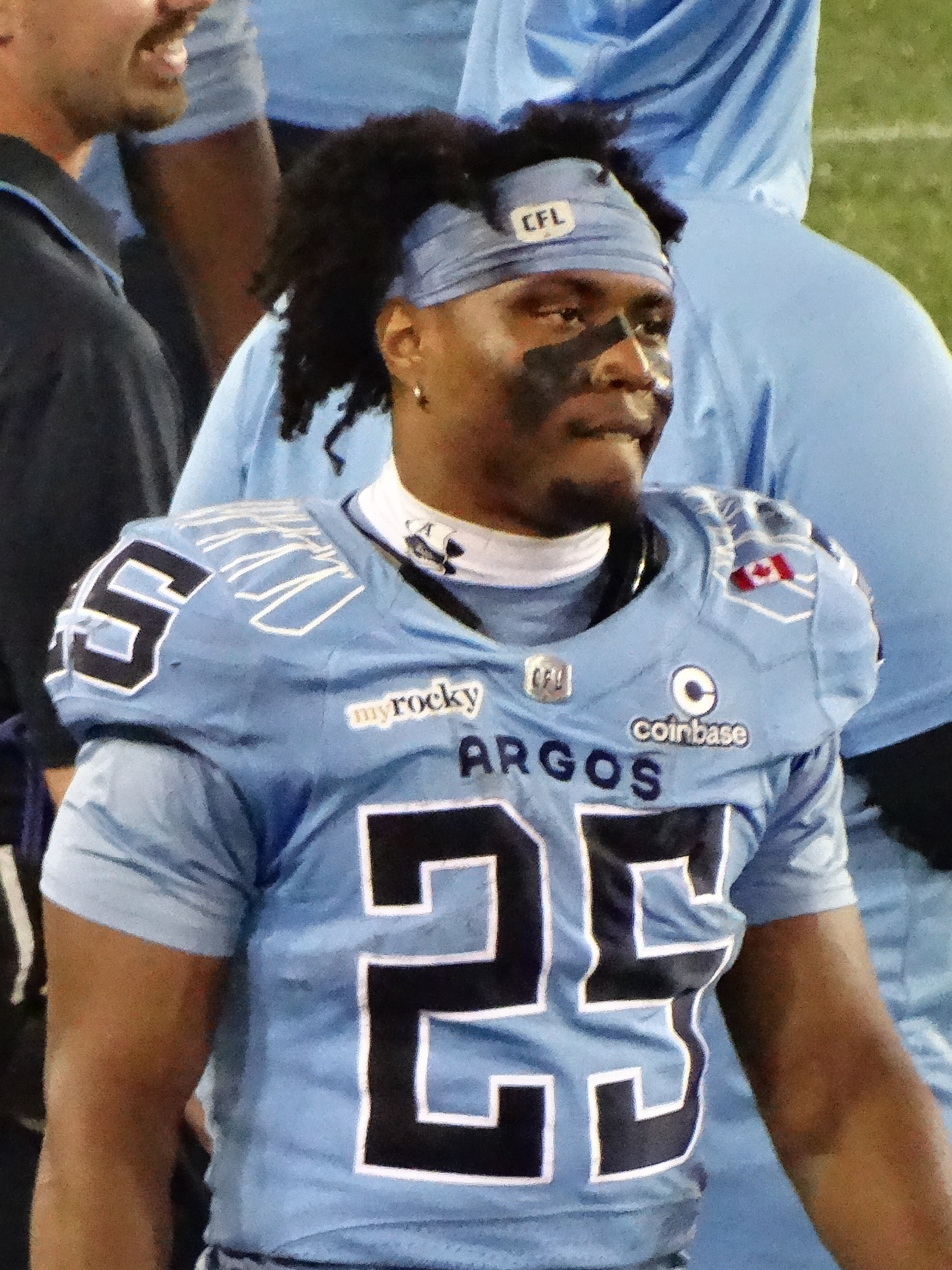
- Hick with the Toronto Argonauts in 2026

No. 25 – Toronto Argonauts
- Position: Running back
- Roster status: Active
- CFL status: American

Personal information
- Born: September 10, 2000 (age 26); Fort Worth, Texas, U.S.
- Listed height: 5 ft 9 in (1.75 m)
- Listed weight: 190 lb (86 kg)

Career information
- High school: Nolan Catholic (Fort Worth)
- College: Abilene Christian (2021); Central Michigan (2022–2023); Saddleback College (2024)
- NFL draft: 2025: undrafted

Career history
- 2026–present: Toronto Argonauts
- Stats at CFL.ca

Samuel Hicks (born September 10, 2000) is an American professional football running back for the Toronto Argonauts of the Canadian Football League (CFL).

== College career ==
Hicks first played college football for the Saddleback College Bobcats as a wide receiver in 2021 where he caught 40 passes for 432 yards and four touchdowns. He then transferred to Central Michigan University to play for the Chippewas from 2022 to 2023. Hicks transferred again to Abilene Christian University, where he played for the Wildcats in 2024. He played in all 14 games at running back and returner, starting in 10, where he had 211 carries for 1,333 yards and 14 touchdowns.

== Professional career ==
After spending 2025 away from organized football, Hicks signed with the Toronto Argonauts on January 26, 2026. He won the starting running back position in training camp for the 2026 season and made his professional debut on June 12, 2026, against the Montreal Alouettes, where he recorded nine carries for 53 yards and three receptions for 29 yards. He scored his first professional touchdown one week later on June 20, 2026, against the Ottawa Redblacks, on a seven-yard carry.
