= James Ceasar =

American gridiron football player (born 1998)

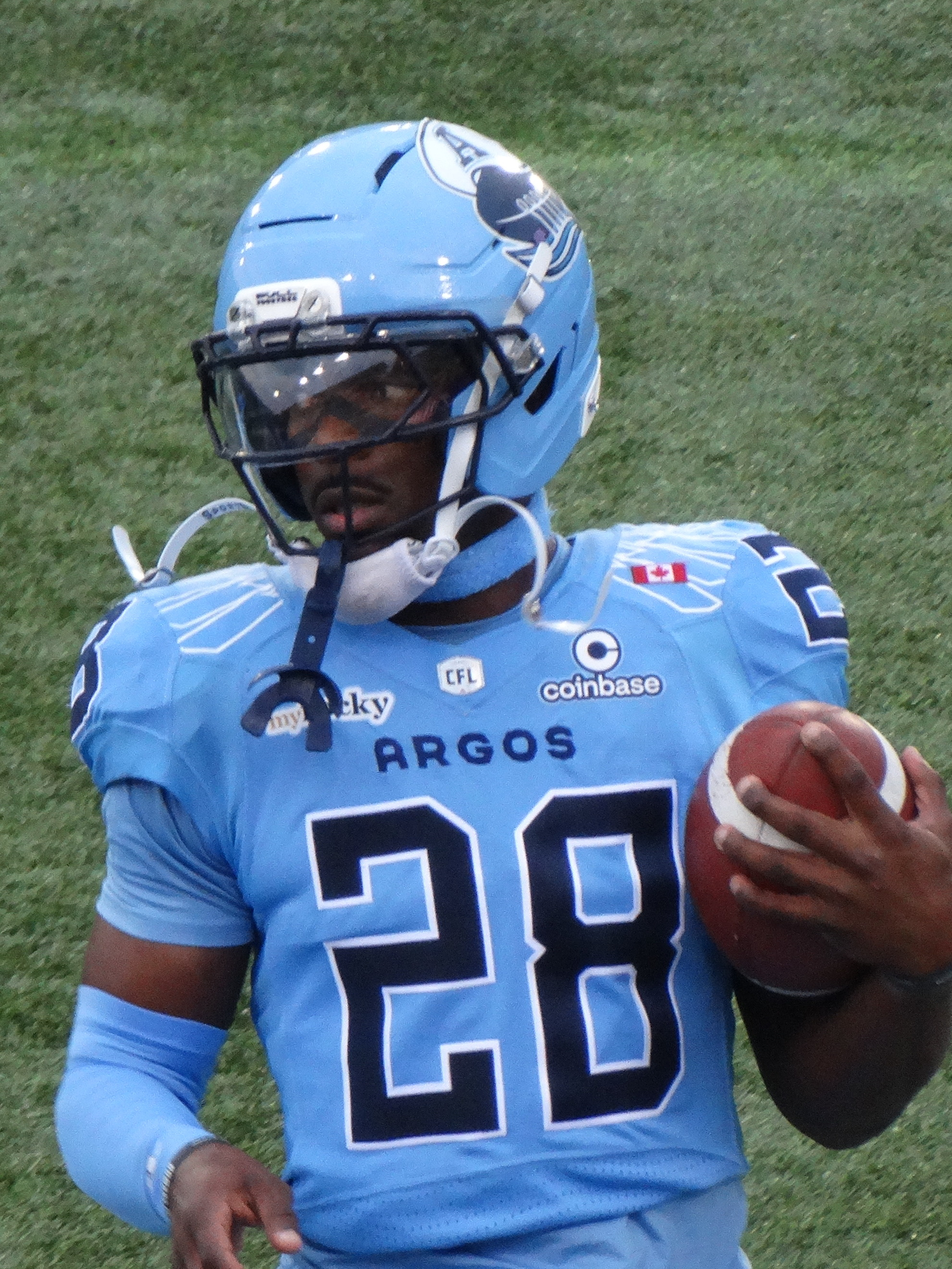
- Ceasar with the Toronto Argonauts in 2026

No. 28 – Toronto Argonauts
- Position: Defensive back
- Roster status: Active
- CFL status: American

Personal information
- Born: June 2, 1998 (age 28); Detroit, Michigan, U.S.
- Listed height: 5 ft 10 in (1.78 m)
- Listed weight: 185 lb (84 kg)

Career information
- High school: East English Village Preparatory
- College: Southern Illinois (2016–2018, 2020–2021); Ferris State (2019)
- NFL draft: 2022: undrafted

Career history
- 2024–2025: Vegas Knight Hawks
- 2026–present: Toronto Argonauts
- Stats at CFL.ca

James Ceasar (born June 2, 1998) is an American professional football defensive back for the Toronto Argonauts of the Canadian Football League (CFL).

== College career ==
Ceasar played college football for the Southern Illinois Salukis from 2016 to 2018 and then re-joined the team and played from 2020 to 2021. He played in 36 games with the Salukis where he recorded 101 tackles, 7.5 tackles for loss, one interception, 1.5 sacks, one forced fumble, and two fumble recoveries. He also spent one year with the Ferris State Bulldogs in 2019 where he played in 11 games and had 31 tackles, including 3.5 tackles for loss, six interceptions, and one sack.

Following his playing career with Southern Illinois, he joined the team as a graduate assistant coach in 2022.

== Professional career ==
=== Vegas Knight Hawks ===
Ceasar signed with the Vegas Knight Hawks for the 2024 season where he played in 13 games and had 58 tackles, 2.5 tackles for loss, six interceptions, and 15 pass knockdowns. In 2025, he played and started in 16 regular season games and three post-season games where he recorded 94 tackles, four interceptions, one forced fumble, one fumble recovery, 20 pass knockdowns, and also returned a kick for a touchdown. He was a member of the 2025 IFL National Championship team that year.

=== Toronto Argonauts ===
Ceasar signed with the Toronto Argonauts on January 27, 2026. He made the active roster following training camp and made his CFL debut on June 12, 2026, against the Montreal Alouettes where he had six defensive tackles and one forced fumble. In the next week against the Ottawa Redblacks, he had his first interception.

== Personal life ==
Ceasar was born to parents Lundrell Johnson and James Ceasar Sr. and has two siblings.
