= Adarius Pickett =

American gridiron football player (born 1996)

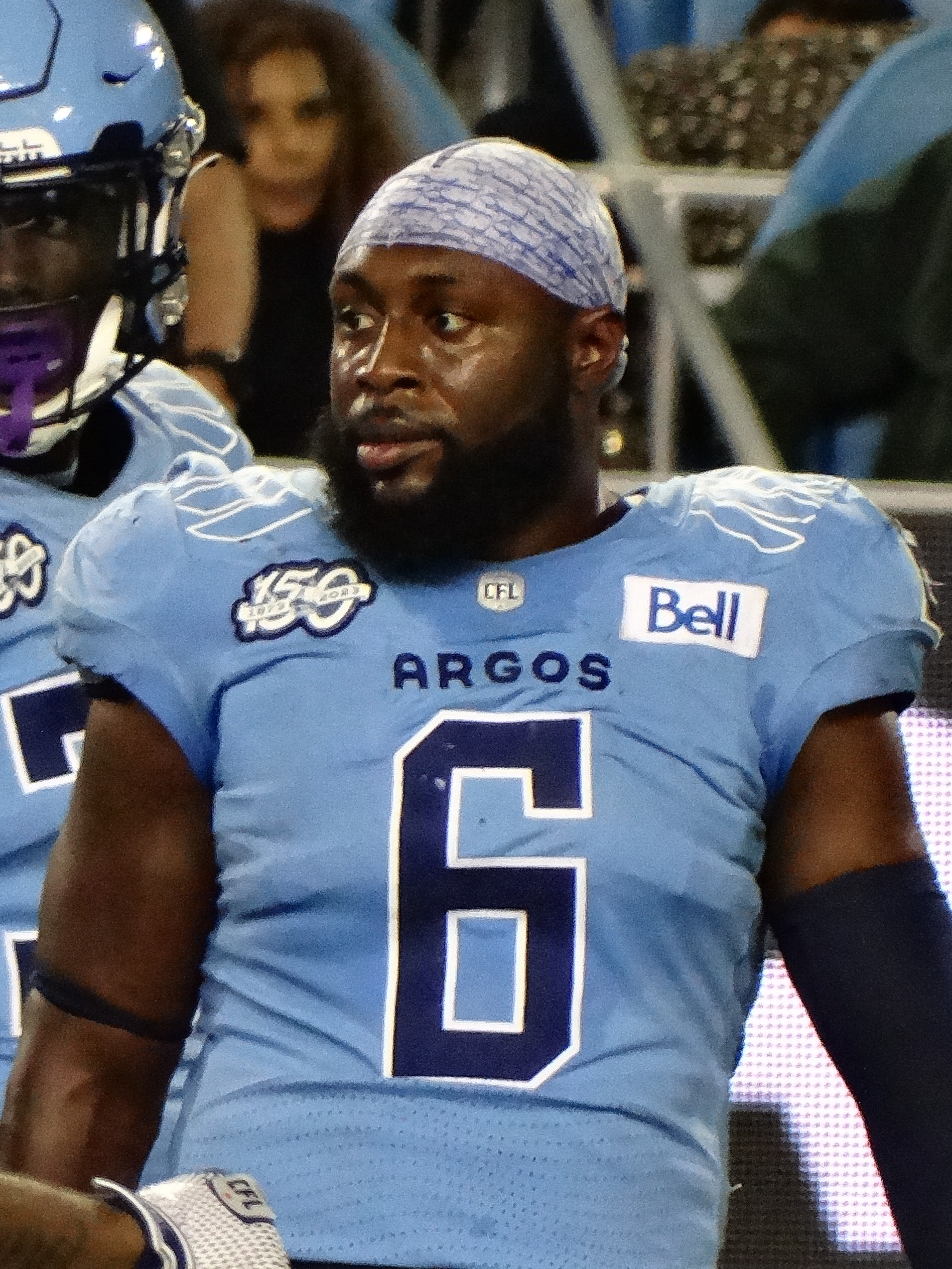
- Pickett with the Toronto Argonauts in 2023

Toronto Argonauts
- Position: Defensive back
- Roster status: Active
- CFL status: American

Personal information
- Born: September 5, 1996 (age 30); Berkeley, California, U.S.
- Listed height: 6 ft 0 in (1.83 m)
- Listed weight: 215 lb (98 kg)

Career information
- High school: El Cerrito (El Cerrito, California)
- College: UCLA (2014–2018)
- NFL draft: 2019: undrafted

Career history
- Chicago Bears (2019)*; Los Angeles Chargers (2019)*; New England Patriots (2019–2020)*; Montreal Alouettes (2021–2022); Toronto Argonauts (2023); Ottawa Redblacks (2024–2025); Toronto Argonauts (2026–present)
- * Offseason or practice squad member only

Awards and highlights
- James P. McCaffrey Trophy (2023); CFL All-Star (2023); 4x CFL East All-Star (2023, 2024, 2025, 2026)

Career CFL statistics as of Week 16, 2026
- Games played: 93
- Defensive tackles: 423
- Spec. team tackles: 77
- Sacks: 16
- Interceptions: 4
- Forced fumbles: 7
- Fumble recoveries: 6
- Stats at CFL.ca
- Stats at Pro Football Reference

Adarius Khyree Pickett (born September 5, 1996) is an American professional football defensive back for the Toronto Argonauts of the Canadian Football League (CFL). He played college football at UCLA.

== Early life ==
His father Antoine Pickett, played minor league baseball for the Kansas City and Oakland systems. Graduated from El Cerrito High School in 2013 were played running back and cornerback, rushing for 1,800 yards and 31 touchdowns, while posting 70 tackles and nine interceptions, including three returned for touchdowns. At El Cerrito Pickett was named Bay Area News Group East Bay Football Player of the Year during highschool he played on both sides of the ball and on the special teams and got the nickname “Pick-Six” after making many big plays.

== College career ==
Pickett played in 50 games over four seasons at UCLA, finishing his career with 274 tackles, one forced fumble, two fumble recoveries, seven interceptions and 20 passes defensed. Pickett led all defensive backs in the nation with 123 tackles as a senior, earning second-team All-Pac-12 for his efforts.

== Professional career ==
Pre-draft measurables
Height	Weight	Arm length	Hand span	Wingspan	40-yard dash	10-yard split	20-yard split	20-yard shuttle	Three-cone drill	Vertical jump	Broad jump	Bench press
5 ft 10 3/4 in (1.80 m)	201 lb (91 kg)	30 3/4 in (0.78 m)	9 in (0.23 m)	6 ft 1 3/4 in (1.87 m)	4.74 s	1.63 s	2.78 s	4.16 s	6.76 s	28.0 in (0.71 m)	9 ft 1 in (2.77 m)	17 reps
All values from Pro Day

=== Chicago Bears ===
Pickett signed with Chicago Bears as an undrafted free agent following the 2019 NFL draft but was released on May 5.

=== Los Angeles Chargers ===
On May 16, 2019, Pickett signed with the Los Angeles Chargers. He was waived on August 31, 2019 and re-signed to the practice squad on September 17. He was released on October 1, 2019.

=== New England Patriots ===
On December 11, 2019, Pickett was signed to the New England Patriots practice squad. He signed a reserve/future contract on January 6, 2020. On July 26, 2020, Pickett was released before training camp opened.

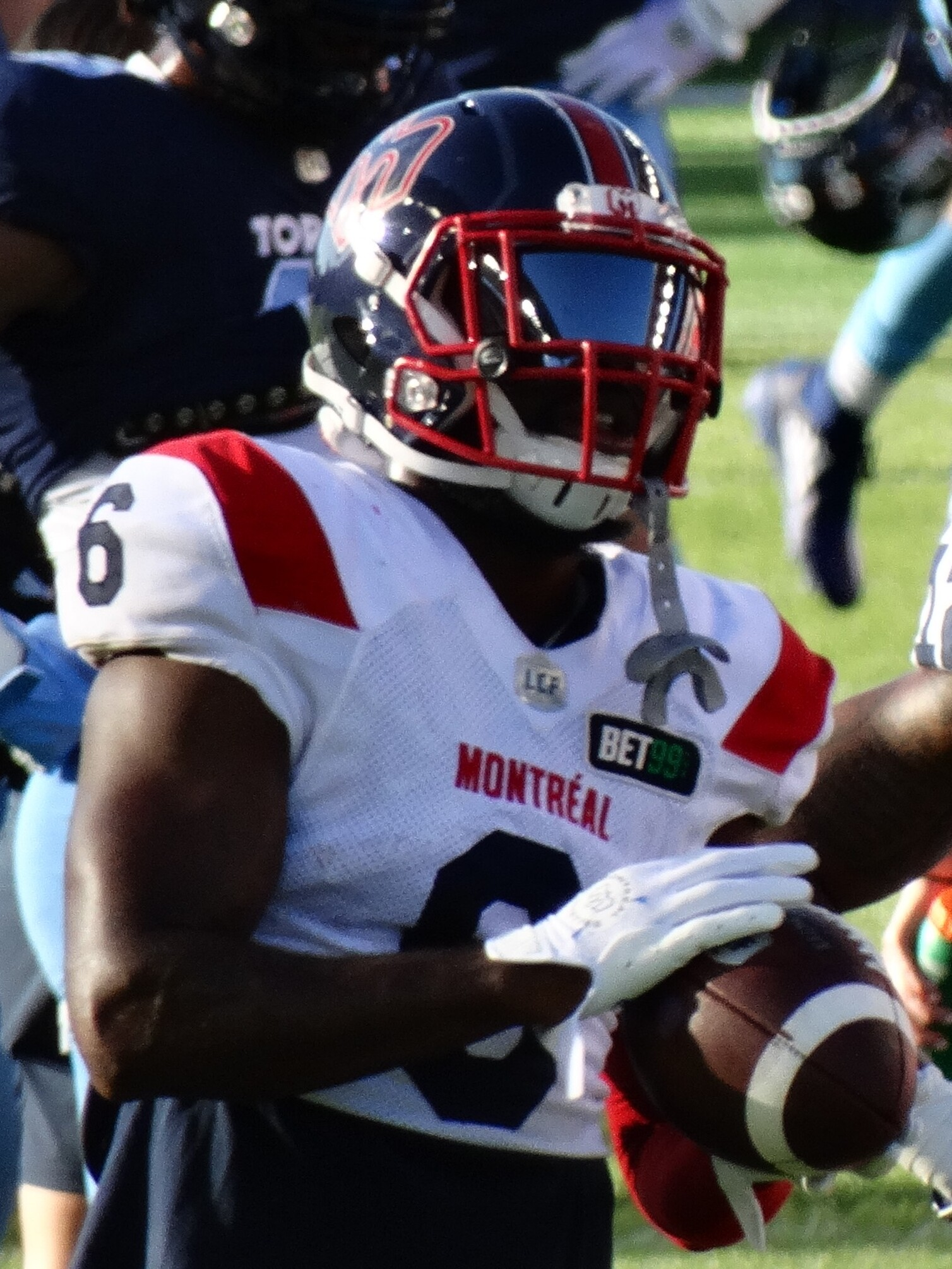
Pickett with the Montreal Alouettes in 2022

Pickett had a tryout with the Tennessee Titans on August 23, 2020.

=== Montreal Alouettes ===
Pickett signed with the Montreal Alouettes of the CFL on June 9, 2021. In his first season, he played in 14 regular season games where he had 23 defensive tackles, 12 special teams tackles, one sack, one interception, and one forced fumble. In 2022, Pickett played in 16 regular season games and recorded 73 defensive tackles, seven special teams tackles, four sacks, one interception, three forced fumbles and two fumble recoveries. He became a free agent upon the expiry of his contract on February 14, 2023.

=== Toronto Argonauts (first stint) ===
On the first day of free agency, on February 14, 2023, it was announced that Pickett had signed with the Toronto Argonauts to a one-year deal. He played in all 18 regular season games where he recorded a career-high 105 defensive tackles, 19 special teams tackles, six sacks, and one forced fumble. He was named an East Division All-Star for the first time in his career and also a CFL All-Star. On February 6, 2024, he was granted an early release by the Argonauts.

=== Ottawa Redblacks ===
On February 5, 2024, during the CFL's Free Agency communication window, it was reported that Pickett would be signing a contract with the Ottawa Redblacks once the free agent market opens on February 13. His one-year contract with the Redblacks was made official on February 6, 2024. In the 2024 season, Pickett played in 13 regular season games after suffering a season-ending injury in week 15. He recorded 52 defensive tackles, 14 special teams tackles, one sack, one interception, and one forced fumble. Despite missing five games, he was named a Divisional Al-Star for the second consecutive year. In 2025, he played in 18 games where he had 84 defensive tackles, 14 special teams tackles, two sacks, one interception, and one forced fumble. As a pending free agent, he was released on January 13, 2026.

=== Toronto Argonauts (second stint) ===
Pickett signed again with the Argonauts on January 16, 2026.

== Career Statistics ==
Legend
	Led the league
**Bold**	League career high

=== CFL ===
Year	Team	Games	Tackles				Fumbles				Interceptions		
Year	Team	GP	Cmb	Sck	TFL	FF	FR	Yds	TD	Int	Yds	TD	PD
2021	MTL	14	35	1.0	0	1	0	0	0	0	0	0	0
2022	MTL	16	80	4.0	0	2	0	0	0	0	0	0	0
2023	TOR	18	124	6.0	5	1	0	0	0	0	0	0	0
2024	OTT	13	66	1.0	0	1	0	0	0	0	0	0	0
2025	OTT	18	98	2.0	5	0	0	0	0	0	0	0	0
2026	TOR	17	116	3.0	6	2	0	0	0	0	0	0	0
Career		96	519	17.0	16	7	0	0	0	0	0	0	0
