= Dalton Bell =

American gridiron football player (born 1983)

Profile
- Position: Quarterback

Personal information
- Born: March 9, 1983 (age 43); Canyon, Texas, U.S.
- Listed height: 6 ft 3 in (1.91 m)
- Listed weight: 210 lb (95 kg)

Career information
- High school: Canyon
- College: West Texas A&M

Career history
- 2007–2008: Green Bay Packers*
- 2008: Seattle Seahawks*
- 2008–2009: Saskatchewan Roughriders
- 2010–2011: Toronto Argonauts
- * Offseason or practice squad member only

Dalton Bell (born March 9, 1983) is an American former professional football player who was a quarterback in the National Football League (NFL) and Canadian Football League (CFL). He played college football for the West Texas A&M Buffaloes and was signed by the NFL's Carolina Panthers as an undrafted free agent in 2007. He was later signed by the Seattle Seahawks. He signed with the Saskatchewan Roughriders in 2008 and was traded to the Toronto Argonauts in 2010. Bell was also a member of the Green Bay Packers and Seattle Seahawks.

== Early life ==
Bell attended Canyon High School in Canyon, Texas and was a student and a letterman in football and track. In football, he was named the Canyon H.S. Offensive M.V.P. and was an All-District Honorable Mention selection.

== College career ==
Bell played in 40 games at West Texas A&M University, with 21 starts. He guided the Buffaloes to back-to-back Lone Star Conference championships and a 20-4 record in two seasons as the team's starting quarterback. He threw for 7,841 yards and 63 touchdowns during his career at West Texas A&M, connecting on 699 of 1044 passes (66.9%).

As a senior, he completed 386 of 583 passes for 3,998 yards and 32 touchdowns. As a junior, he passed for 3,799 yards and 30 touchdowns, completing 311 of 454 passes, and threw for more than 400 yards in 4 of the 11 games he started. As a sophomore, he completed just 1 of 5 passes for 8 yards, but ran for a 54-yard touchdown against Texas A&M-Kingsville.

== Professional career ==
=== Carolina Panthers ===
Bell signed with the Carolina Panthers in 2007 as a rookie free agent was released on team's final roster cuts.

=== Green Bay Packers ===
Bell signed with the Green Bay Packers in 2007 spent time on the practice squad.

=== Seattle Seahawks ===
Bell signed with the Seattle Seahawks in 2008 and spent most of the time on the practice squad. He was released and subsequently signed with the Saskatchewan Roughriders of the CFL.

=== Saskatchewan Roughriders ===
Bell signed a practice roster agreement with the Saskatchewan Roughriders on October 8, 2008 and spent the rest of the season as the fourth-string quarterback. After former starter Michael Bishop was released, Bell was promoted to third-string quarterback for the 2009 season but did not see any touches that season.

=== Toronto Argonauts ===
On March 9, 2010 (his birthday), it was announced that Bell had been traded to the Toronto Argonauts for a 5th round pick in the 2010 CFL draft. He got his first career professional start against his former team, the Roughriders, on Oct 2, 2010, a 27-16 loss. He entered free agency on February 15, 2012.
