= Tucker Horn =

American gridiron football player (born 1999)

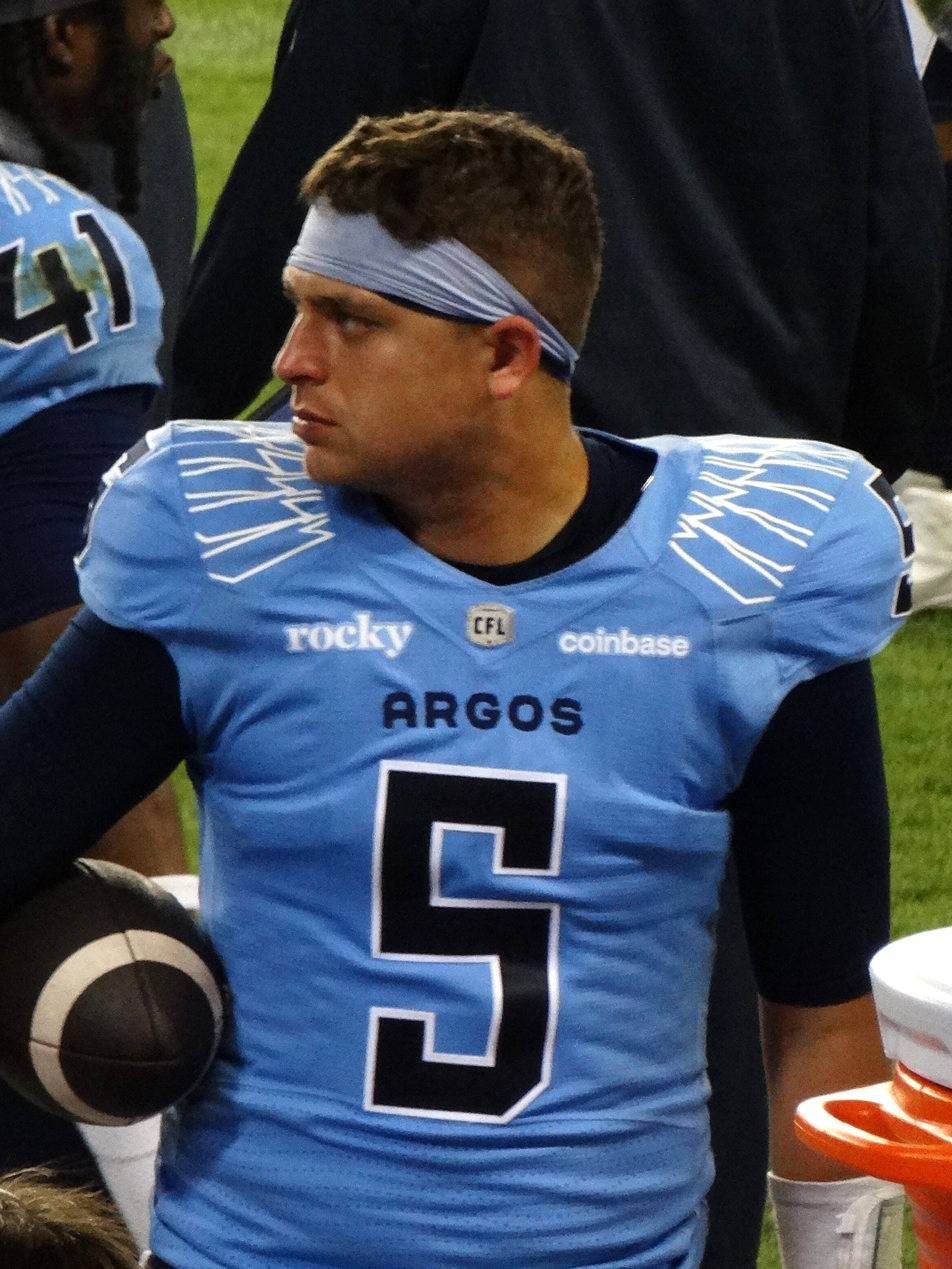
- Horn with the Toronto Argonauts in 2025

No. 5 – Toronto Argonauts
- Position: Quarterback
- Roster status: Active
- CFL status: American

Personal information
- Born: November 29, 1999 (age 26); Lubbock, Texas, U.S.
- Listed height: 6 ft 1 in (1.85 m)
- Listed weight: 195 lb (88 kg)

Career information
- High school: Graham High (Graham, Texas)
- College: Abilene Christian (2018); Trinity (2019–2023)
- NFL draft: 2024: undrafted

Career history
- 2025–present: Toronto Argonauts
- Stats at CFL.ca

Tucker Horn (born November 29, 1999) is an American professional football quarterback for the Toronto Argonauts of the Canadian Football League (CFL).

== College career ==
Horn first attended Abilene Christian University where he redshirted for the Wildcats in his freshman year in 2018. He then transferred to Trinity University in 2019 to play for the Tigers. From 2019 to 2023, Horn played in 42 games where he completed 710 of 1,048 pass attempts for 97 touchdowns and 17 interceptions. He led the team to SAA conference championships in 2019, 2021, 2022, and 2023.

== Professional career ==
On October 17, 2024, it was announced that Horn had signed a futures contract with the Toronto Argonauts for the 2025 season. Due to his strong play in the preseason, where he completed 26 passes out of 38 attempts for 276 yards and one touchdown in two games, the Argonauts released incumbent backup Cameron Dukes and Horn made the team's active roster as the third-string quarterback while Chad Kelly began the season on the injured list.

== Personal life ==
Horn was born to parents Jeff and Kari Horn and has two brothers, Raider, a medical student at Texas Tech University Health Science Center, and Welker, a sophomore quarterback at Trinity University in San Antonio, Texas.
