= Chad Kelly =

American gridiron football player (born 1994)

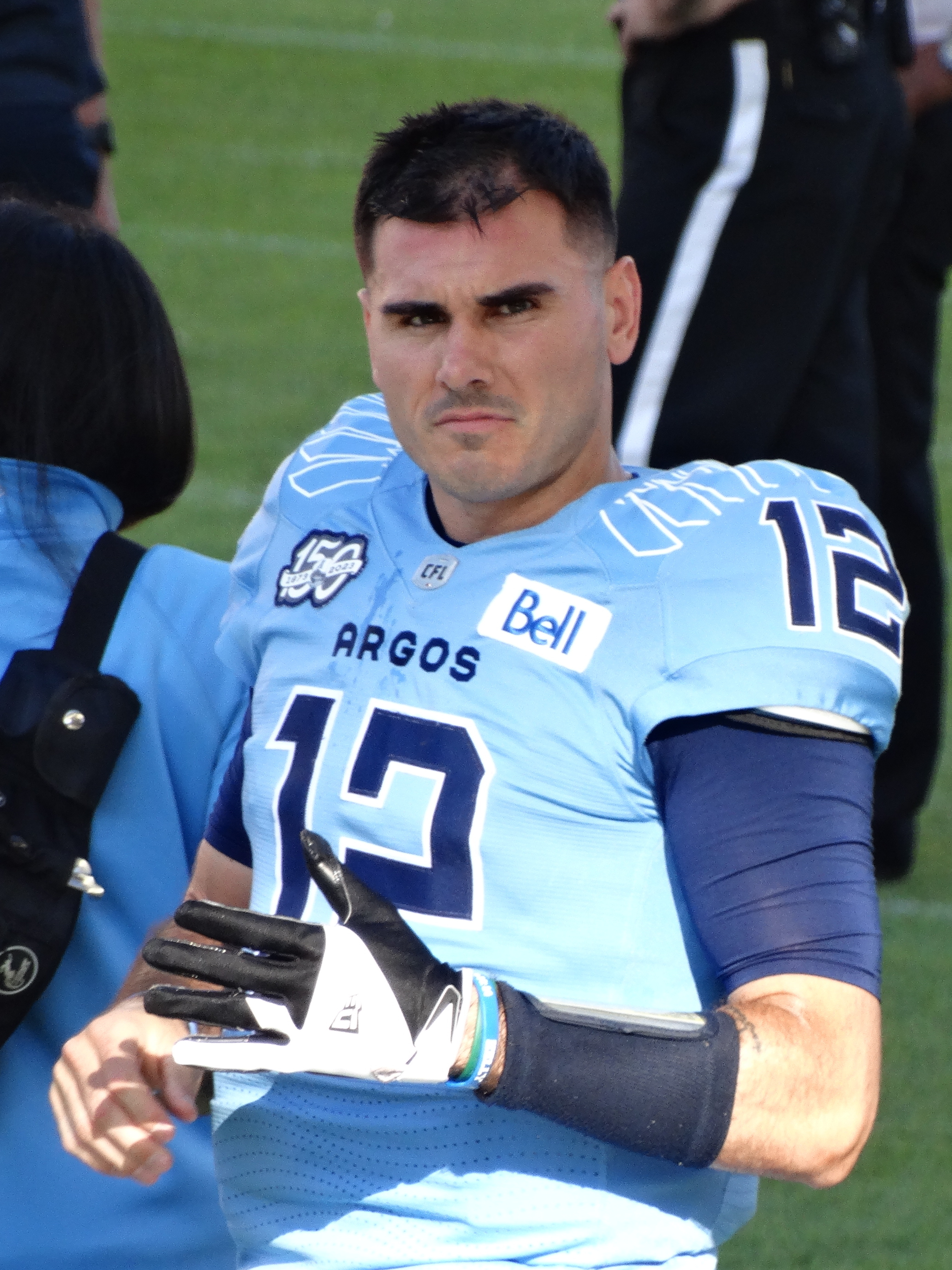
- Kelly with the Toronto Argonauts in 2023

No. 12 – Toronto Argonauts
- Position: Quarterback
- Roster status: Active
- CFL status: American

Personal information
- Born: March 26, 1994 (age 32); Buffalo, New York, U.S.
- Listed height: 6 ft 2 in (1.88 m)
- Listed weight: 216 lb (98 kg)

Career information
- High school: St. Joseph's Collegiate Institute (Tonawanda, New York)
- College: Clemson (2012–2013); East Mississippi CC (2014); Ole Miss (2015–2016)
- NFL draft: 2017: 7th round, 253rd overall pick

Career history

Playing
- Denver Broncos (2017–2018); Indianapolis Colts (2019–2020); Toronto Argonauts (2022–present)

Coaching
- East Mississippi CC (2021) Offensive assistant coach

Awards and highlights
- 2× Grey Cup champion (2022, 2024); CFL Most Outstanding Player (2023); CFL All-Star (2023); CFL East All-Star (2023); Terry Evanshen Trophy (2023); NJCAA National champion (2014); First-team All-SEC (2015); Second-team All-SEC (2016); Sugar Bowl MVP (2016)

Career NFL statistics
- Games played: 1
- Stats at Pro Football Reference

Career CFL statistics as of 2026
- Passing completions: 837
- Passing attempts: 1,213
- Completion percentage: 69.0%
- Passing yards: 11,938
- TD–INT: 68–47
- Stats at CFL.ca

Chad Patrick Kelly (born March 26, 1994) is an American professional football quarterback for the Toronto Argonauts of the Canadian Football League (CFL). He played college football for the Clemson Tigers and Ole Miss Rebels. The Denver Broncos selected him in the seventh round with the final pick of the 2017 NFL draft, making him that year's Mr. Irrelevant.

After several years as a reserve player on the Broncos and later the Indianapolis Colts, Kelly signed with the Argonauts, gaining success as a starter in the CFL. He won the CFL Most Outstanding Player in 2023, in addition to helping the Argonauts win two Grey Cups.

== Early life ==
Kelly was born to Charlene Cudzylo and Kevin Kelly, a supermarket manager and younger brother of Pro Football Hall of Fame quarterback Jim Kelly. He spent his early years in Western New York, his mother's home area, not far from where his uncle Jim was playing professional football. Chad Kelly was a consistent strong performer in Punt, Pass, and Kick competitions as a youth, becoming national champion four times. His family moved to Red Lion, Pennsylvania, after Kevin was assigned to a Wegmans in the area, but unexplained disciplinary issues removed Chad from the Red Lion High School football team, and he returned to Western New York.

Regarding Chad's early football career, a football coach once said, "Being Jim Kelly's nephew has been harder for him than it has helped him. A lot is expected of him because he’s Jim's nephew. He was never just 'Chad' or even 'Kevin Kelly’s son.' He was always 'Jim Kelly’s nephew.'"

Jim Kelly said of his nephew, "Athletic ability, Chad has more than I had", with "a freaking rocket for an arm". Kelly attended St. Joseph's Collegiate Institute in Tonawanda, New York. He passed for 2,159 yards and 24 touchdowns and rushed for 1,059 yards and 15 touchdowns as a junior. He passed for 3,050 yards, 27 touchdowns and rushed for 991 yards with 14 touchdowns as a senior. He was rated by Rivals.com as a four-star recruit and was ranked among the top dual-threat quarterbacks in his class. Kelly won the prestigious Connolly Cup, given to the most outstanding high school football player in Western New York in 2011. Kelly committed to Clemson University to play college football.

== College career ==
=== Clemson ===
Kelly was redshirted his first year at Clemson in 2012. As a freshman in 2013, he appeared in five games, passing for 58 yards and rushing for 117 yards with a touchdown. In April 2014, Kelly was dismissed from Clemson's football team due to conduct detrimental to the team.

=== East Mississippi ===
He transferred to East Mississippi Community College, where he spent one year. In his lone season with the Lions, he started 12 games and threw for 3,906 yards with 47 touchdowns and eight interceptions. He led East Mississippi to an undefeated 12–0 record and victory in the NJCAA National Football Championship over Iowa Western Community College.

=== Ole Miss ===
In December 2014, Kelly committed to the University of Mississippi under head coach Hugh Freeze. In his first year at Ole Miss, Kelly was named the starting quarterback.

Kelly played in his first game with Mississippi on September 5, 2015, against UT Martin and completed 9 for 15 pass attempts for 211 yards and two touchdowns while adding a 20-yard rushing touchdown. On September 19, 2015, he led Ole Miss to its second victory ever at Tuscaloosa. In the 43–37 victory over No. 2 Alabama, he completed 18 out of 33 passes for 341 passing yards and 3 passing touchdowns. On November 7, 2015, Kelly accounted for 478 total yards and six touchdowns against Arkansas. Although he completed 24-of-34 passes for 368 passing yards and three passing touchdowns, Mississippi lost to Arkansas, 53–52, in overtime. The following week, he threw two touchdown passes and rushed for two touchdowns in a 38–17 victory over No. 15 LSU. On January 1, 2016, he helped lead Ole Miss to a 48–20 victory over No. 16 Oklahoma State in the 2016 All-State Sugar Bowl. He won Sugar Bowl MVP Honors after accounting for 21 completions out of 33 passes for 302 passing yards, four touchdowns, and one interception. Kelly also led the team with 73 rushing yards on 10 carries. His 4 passing touchdowns tied a Sugar Bowl record and were most ever by a Rebels' quarterback in the Sugar Bowl.

Kelly finished his first season with Ole Miss with 298 of 458 (65.1%) completions for 31 touchdowns and 13 interceptions. He also accounted for 10 rushing touchdowns while appearing in all 13 games. While finishing the season with a 10–3 record, he became the first Ole Miss quarterback to lead the Rebels with victories over Alabama, Auburn, and LSU in the same season.

Kelly returned for his senior season in 2016. On November 5, 2016, Kelly suffered an injury during a 37–27 victory over Georgia Southern. The following day, it was reported that he would miss the rest of the season due to a torn ACL and a torn lateral meniscus. On February 16, 2017, the NFL rescinded an offer previously made to Kelly to participate in the NFL Scouting Combine.

== Professional career ==
Pre-draft measurables
Height	Weight	Arm length	Hand span	Wingspan
6 ft 1 3/4 in (1.87 m)	228 lb (103 kg)	32 in (0.81 m)	9 1/8 in (0.23 m)	6 ft 4 5/8 in (1.95 m)
All values from Pro Day

=== Denver Broncos ===
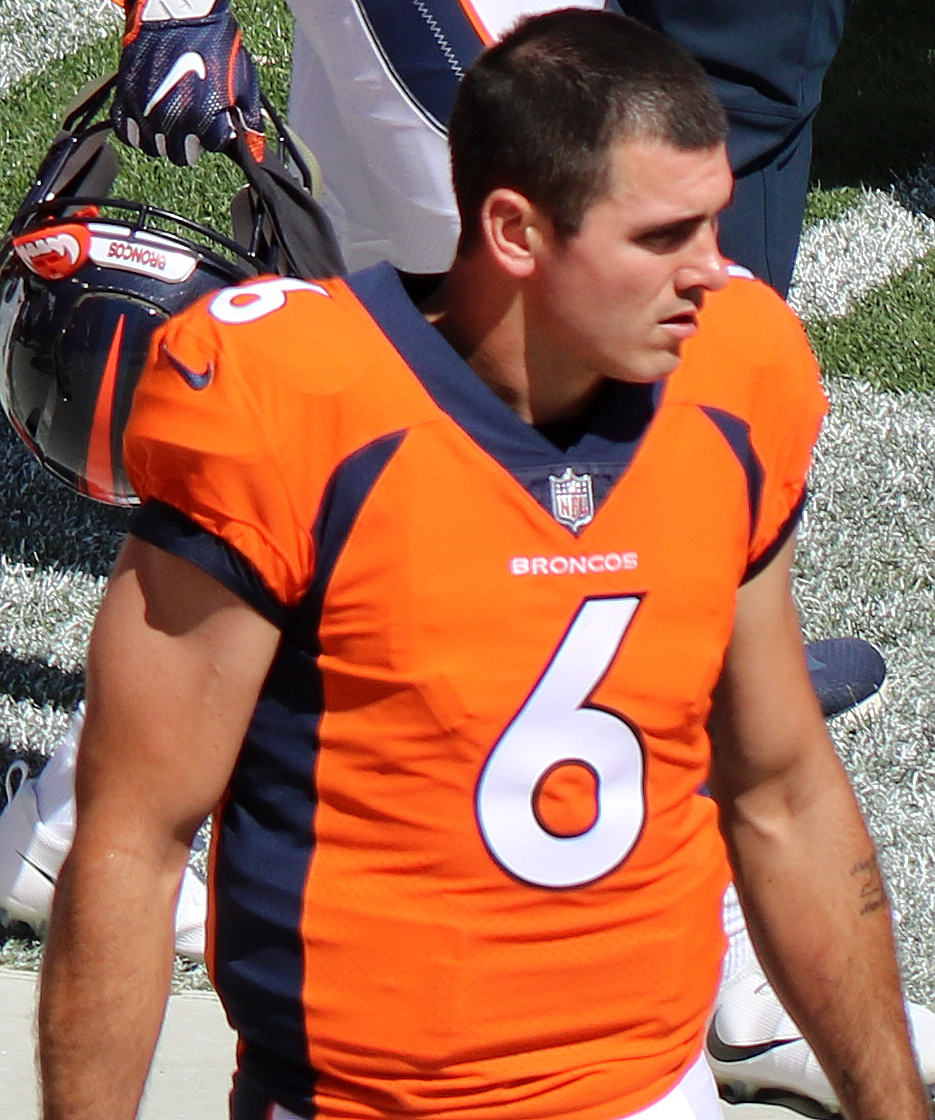
Kelly with the Denver Broncos in 2018

Kelly was selected by the Denver Broncos in the seventh round, 253rd overall, the last selection in the 2017 NFL draft (Mr. Irrelevant). He was placed on the reserve/non-football injury list after having offseason wrist surgery.

Going into mini-camps for the 2018 season, he would compete with 2016 first-round draft pick Paxton Lynch for the backup quarterback role behind newly acquired Case Keenum. On August 13, 2018, Kelly was promoted to second-team to act as Keenum's backup. In Week 6 of the 2018 season, Kelly appeared in his first NFL game, kneeling for a one-yard loss at the end of the first half.

On October 24, 2018, the Broncos released Kelly following his arrest on suspicion of first-degree criminal trespassing. He allegedly entered a couple's place of residence after leaving teammate Von Miller’s Halloween party. On March 20, 2019, Kelly pleaded guilty to misdemeanor second-degree criminal trespassing for the incident.

=== Indianapolis Colts ===
On May 20, 2019, Kelly signed with the Indianapolis Colts. He was suspended the first two games of the regular season for violating the NFL's personal conduct policy. After being reinstated from suspension, Kelly was waived by Indianapolis on September 18. He was re-signed to the team's practice squad the following day. Kelly was promoted to the active roster on November 9.

On September 5, 2020, Kelly was waived by the Colts; he was re–signed to the practice squad the next day. He was released by the Colts on September 30.

After being released from the Colts, Kelly temporarily stepped away from his professional playing career and returned to East Mississippi where he briefly worked as an offensive coach.

=== Toronto Argonauts ===
On February 11, 2022, Kelly signed with the Toronto Argonauts of the Canadian Football League (CFL). In the Argos first preseason game Kelly completed seven of 12 pass attempts for 78 yards. He completed eight of 15 pass attempts in his second preseason game, throwing for 85 yards with one touchdown and one interception. The Argos released Antonio Pipkin as part of the team's final roster cuts, which promoted Kelly to the role of backup quarterback to veteran McLeod Bethel-Thompson to begin the 2022 season. Kelly served as the backup quarterback for the entire season before being named the team's starting quarterback for the Argo's final match of the regular season. In the 109th Grey Cup, after Bethel-Thompson injured his throwing hand in the fourth quarter, Kelly came off the bench with the Argos trailing 23–17 and helped lead them to a 24–23 win against the Winnipeg Blue Bombers. He completed four of six passes for 43 yards and rushed twice for 21 yards, including a 20-yard run to convert a second and 15 on the team's game-winning touchdown drive.

Kelly started the Argos 2023 campaign as the starting quarterback, with a 32–14 win over the Hamilton Tiger-Cats. On August 31, 2023, Kelly and the Argos agreed to a three-year contract extension worth a total of $1.865 million, making him the highest paid player in the league. The team would go 16–2 though lost to the eventual champion Montreal in the East final. Following the season Kelly won the CFL's Most Outstanding Player Award.

On May 7, 2024, the CFL announced that Kelly was suspended for at least nine games after an investigation into allegations made against him and the Argonauts by a former strength and conditioning coach. On August 18, he was reinstated by the CFL on a "last-chance agreement" that requires him to follow a number of confidential conditions. Kelly played in nine games for the Argonauts, starting in eight, where he had 175 completions, 2,451 yards, 10 touchdowns, and eight interceptions. In his first playoff start since his disastrous playoff starting debut in 2023, Kelly completed 18 of 20 passes for 358 yards and four touchdowns, for an uncapped passer rating of 218.3, which was the second highest of any CFL game ever. In the East Final game against the Montreal Alouettes on November 9, Kelly was involved in a play in which Isaac Adeyemi-Berglund fell on his right leg, resulting in tibia and fibula fractures. He subsequently underwent surgery to repair the fractures and was given a recovery timetable of roughly six months. In his absence, Nick Arbuckle started the 111th Grey Cup where the Argonauts defeated the Blue Bombers and Kelly won his second championship.

Kelly began the 2025 season on the one-game injured list as the team had wanted him to practice with the team as he recovered. However, despite being listed as "week-to-week", he was later placed on the six-game injured list on July 27, 2025, with Arbuckle continuing as the starting quarterback. After Arbuckle was injured in September, Kelly remained off the roster as the team's playoff hopes dwindled. He eventually sat out the entire season due to injury as the Argonauts missed the playoffs for the first time since 2019.

Kelly returned from his injury in 2026 and resumed his role as the Argonauts' starting quarterback. Starting 16 games, Kelly set career-highs in passing yards and touchdowns with 5,067 and 33, but also threw a league-leading 24 interceptions. He was named the Argonauts' nominee for Most Outstanding Player as he led the Argonauts back to the playoffs after a one-year absence. On October 27, 2026, at the conclusion of the 2026 season, Kelly signed a five-year $5.55 million contract extension with the Argonauts, making him the first $1 million player in CFL salary cap era.

== Professional statistics ==
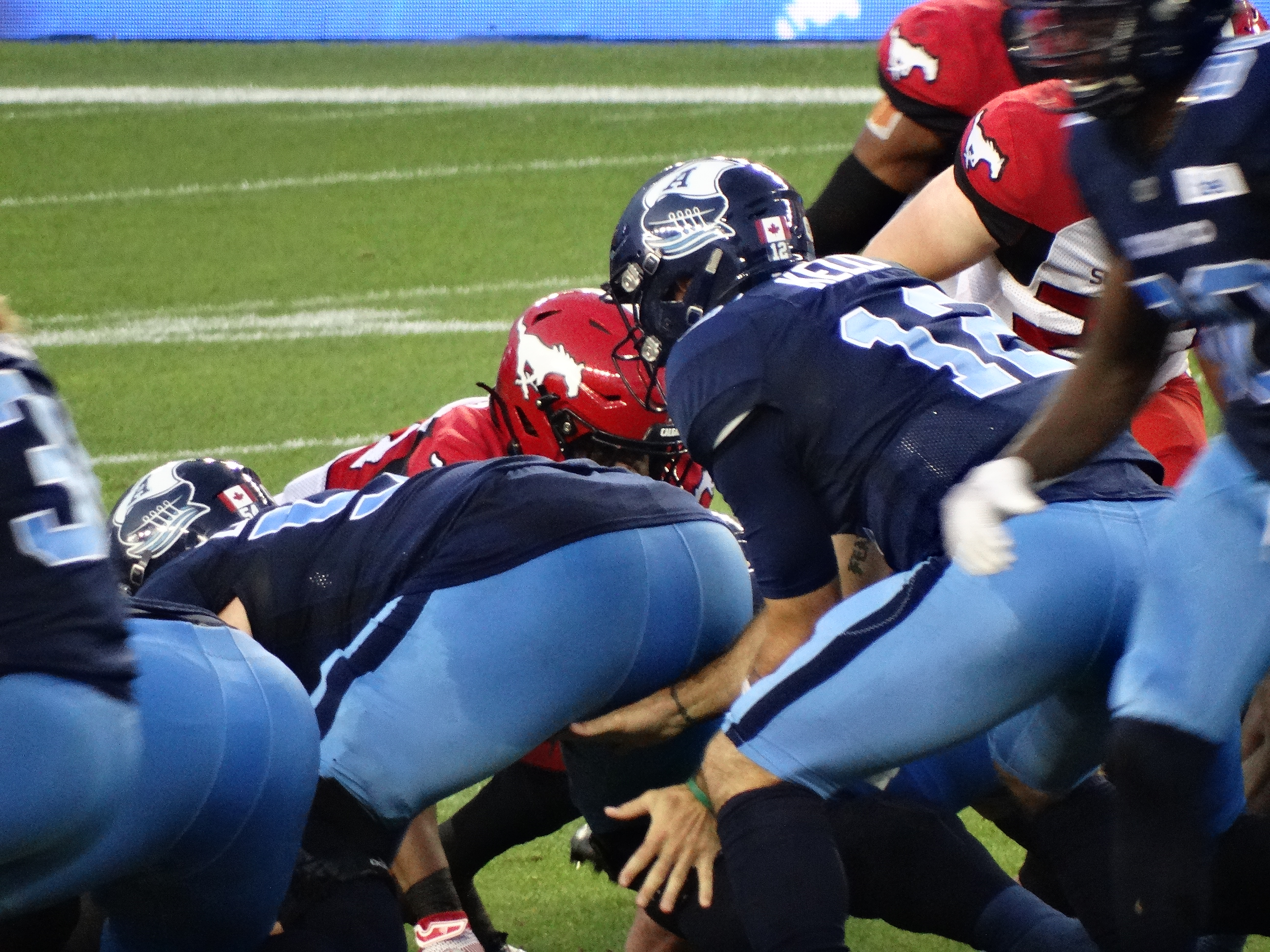
Kelly under center in 2022

Legend
	Won the CFL's Most Outstanding Player Award
	Won the Grey Cup
	Led the league
**Bold**	Career high

=== NFL ===
Year	Team	Games		Passing								Rushing			
Year	Team	GP	GS	Cmp	Att	Pct	Yds	Y/A	TD	Int	Rtg	Att	Yds	Y/A	TD
2017	DEN	0	0	Did not play due to injury											
2018	DEN	**1**	0	0	0	0.0	0	0.0	0	0	0.0	1	−1	−1.0	0
2019	IND	0	0	DNP											
2020	IND	0	0	DNP											
Career		1	0	0	0	0.0	0	0.0	0	0	0.0	1	−1	−1.0	0

=== CFL ===
==== Regular season ====
Year	Team	Games			Passing								Rushing				
Year	Team	GP	GS	Record	Cmp	Att	Pct	Yds	Y/A	TD	Int	Rtg	Att	Yds	Y/A	Lng	TD
2022	TOR	18	1	0–1	26	45	57.8	297	6.6	2	3	64.8	25	137	5.5	**42**	6
2023	TOR	18	16	**15–1**	270	394	68.5	4,123	**10.5**	23	12	**109.6**	40	**248**	6.2	18	**8**
2024	TOR	9	8	5–3	175	258	67.8	2,451	9.5	10	8	98.2	**48**	214	4.5	18	5
2025	TOR	0	0	—	Did not play due to injury												
2026	TOR	16	16	9–7	**366**	**516**	**70.9**	**5,067**	9.8	**33**	**24**	104.0	29	183	**6.3**	18	3
Career		61	41	29–12	837	1,213	69.0	11,938	9.8	68	47	103.1	142	782	5.5	42	22

==== Postseason ====
Year	Team	Games			Passing								Rushing			
Year	Team	GD	GS	Record	Cmp	Att	Pct	Yds	Y/A	TD	Int	Rtg	Att	Yds	Avg	TD
2022	TOR	2	0	0–0	5	7	71.4	89	12.7	1	0	153.3	7	30	4.3	0
2023	TOR	1	1	0–1	21	36	58.3	246	6.8	1	4	48.8	8	62	7.8	0
2024	TOR	2	2	2–0	29	42	69.0	540	12.9	5	2	131.4	6	55	9.2	1
2026	TOR	1	1	0–1	18	30	60.0	193	6.4	1	0	90.0	0	0	0.0	0
Career		6	4	2–2	73	115	63.5	1,068	9.3	8	6	95.1	21	147	7.0	1

=== College ===
Year	Team	Games			Passing								Rushing			
Year	Team	GP	GS	Record	Cmp	Att	Pct	Yds	Y/A	TD	Int	Rtg	Att	Yds	Avg	TD
2012	Clemson	0	0	—	Redshirted (redshirt)											
2013	Clemson	5	0	—	10	17	58.8	58	3.4	0	0	87.5	16	117	7.3	1
2014	East Mississippi	12	12	12–0	303	453	66.9	3,906	8.6	47	8	170.0	69	446	6.5	4
2015	Ole Miss	13	13	10–3	298	458	65.1	4,822	8.8	41	13	155.9	106	509	4.8	10
2016	Ole Miss	9	9	4–5	205	328	62.5	3,758	8.4	19	8	147.4	81	332	4.1	5
Career		39	34	26–8	513	803	63.9	6,858	8.5	50	21	150.9	203	958	4.7	16

== Personal life ==
Kelly's younger brother Casey also played quarterback for St. Joseph's and Mallard Creek High School. He began his college career playing tight end at Ole Miss before transferring to Oregon and then East Carolina.

In December 2014, Kelly was arrested following an altercation outside of a Buffalo, New York, nightclub in which he fought with bouncers and resisted arrest. Criminal charges were dropped in exchange for his plea of guilty to disorderly conduct, and he was ordered to complete fifty hours of community service.

In early 2024, Kelly was named in a wrongful dismissal lawsuit by a former Toronto Argonaut coach, with allegations that Kelly had made attempts of "unwanted romantic advances and escalating into instances of threatening language" leading to the coach’s dismissal upon reporting the incidents. The lawsuit prompted a denial by Kelly and a league investigation.
