= 2026 CFL season =

Canadian Football League season

- Duration: June 4 – October 24, 2026
- East champions: Montreal Alouettes
- West champions: Edmonton Elks

113th Grey Cup
- Date: November 15, 2026
- Venue: McMahon Stadium, Calgary
- Champions: Edmonton Elks

CFL seasons
- ← 2025 2027 →

Locations of the active CFL teams West East

The 2026 CFL season was the 72nd season of modern professional Canadian football. Officially, it was the 68th season of the Canadian Football League. Calgary hosted the 113th Grey Cup on November 15, 2026. The regular season began on June 4 and ended on October 24.

== CFL news in 2026 ==
=== Salary cap ===
The salary cap for the 2026 season is $6,330,514 ($140,755 per active roster spot) per team. Including non-football related services of $110,000, the total salary expenditure cap was to be at or above $6,440,514. This will be the third season that players will receive revenue sharing, which will be set at 27% this season. The minimum player salary was set at $70,000, which remains unchanged since 2023.

According to the new collective bargaining agreement, the 2026 salary cap was scheduled to be at least $6,162,365, largely as a result of the revenue sharing increase from 2025. On January 23, 2026, the CFL and CFLPA announced the cap will be $6,280,514 ($139,567 per active roster spot). Under the revenue share formula in the collective agreement, the CFLPA elected to allocate $50,000 per club preseason veteran bonus payment and $218,149 increase in each clubs salary cap. On April 29, the league and CFLPA agreed to a $6,330,514 salary cap ($140,678 average) for 2026 season and increased playoff compensation for 2027 season.

=== Rule changes ===
On September 22, 2025 and May 12, 2026, the league and commissioner Stewart Johnston announced that a series of significant rule changes would come into effect for the 2026 season.

- 35-second play clock: Teams will have 35 seconds to begin the next play after the previous play is whistled dead. Previously, following a play, the referees placed the ball and a 20-second play clock was initiated by an official, leading to inconsistencies based on the officiating team. A 20-second clock will still be utilized after the 3-minute warning of each half beginning with the first play after the 3-minute time-out.
- Opposite-field team benches: To facilitate the play clock change, all teams will be required to have their bench areas on opposite sidelines of the field, reducing the distance required for substitutions. In the 2025 season, the BC Lions and all East Division teams had team benches side-by-side on one side of the field.
- Ineligible receiver: An incomplete pass will be added to the possible outcomes available to the defending team when an ineligible receiver penalty is called against the offence.
- Modified rouge: A single will no longer be awarded if it is kicked past the dead line or through the side of the endzone. A single can only be scored if a punt, field goal, or kickoff settles in the end zone, and the returner fails to take it out or takes a knee in the end zone.
- Dead-ball placement: If a field goal attempt hits the goalpost and no points are awarded, or if a kick goes out of bounds through the end zone without a single awarded, the receiving team will scrimmage from its 40-yard line.
- Overtime: If the game is tied after regulation, "mini-games" will still be played where each team has one possession starting from the opponent's 35-yard line. Should the score remain level after a second mini-game, teams will alternate 2-point conversion attempts from the 3-yard line until a winner is determined, therefore assuring that regular-season games will no longer end in a tie. This alternate-play rule change is similar to that employed by American college football since 2021.
- Replay: The league's Replay Centre will automatically review any turnover on downs.
- Kneel-downs: A half or the game may end on a single kneel if the defence does not have a time-out, if it is first down and the offence wishes to end the half or game, and if 40 seconds or less remain on the game clock.
- Roster flexibility: Prior to the game, teams may provide officials with a third ineligible number capable of reporting and lining up in an eligible position.

=== Relocated games ===
The home stadiums of the BC Lions and Toronto Argonauts hosted 2026 FIFA World Cup games from June 12, 2026, to July 7, 2026, resulting in those stadiums being unavailable for most of June and July.

The Argonauts played three additional road games at Hamilton, Saskatchewan, and Winnipeg during the World Cup, with its six home games being scheduled towards the second half of the season; although these were initially referred to as "home" games, the Argonauts were officially designated as the visiting team. The Argonauts also played their preseason game in Guelph at Alumni Stadium for the fifth season in a row.

The Edmonton Elks moved their preseason game against the Calgary Stampeders on May 29 to Clarke Stadium, as Canada was hosting a pre-World Cup friendly against Uzbekistan on June 1. Clarke Stadium, located directly beside Commonwealth Stadium, was the team's former home stadium. This was the first time since 1978 that the stadium hosted a professional football game.

On September 26, 2025, the Lions announced that they would play their first two regular season home games in Kelowna at the Apple Bowl with an expanded capacity of 17,500 seats. The Lions also announced that their pre-season game would be played in Langford at Starlight Stadium for the second consecutive season.

The Roughriders played a preseason game at Griffiths Stadium at the University of Saskatchewan in Saskatoon.

=== Schedule ===
The season schedule was released on December 9, 2025, notably featuring four relocated pre-season games and five relocated regular season games. The season started on June 4, with three teams on a bye week, with the three opening-week games being the fewest in league history. The 112th Grey Cup rematch took place on the Thanksgiving Day Classic as opposed to the more typical early season entry. The schedule also features a quadruple-header for the Labour Day rematch games, which was the first time since 1995, when the CFL had 13 teams, that the league played four games in one day. The season featured more Sunday games with five games from week 4 to week 8 and three games from week 12 to week 14. The regular season concluded on October 24, 2026, with two games kicking off at 3:00pm ET.

=== Coaching changes ===
Team	2025 HC	2026 HC	Comments
Ottawa Redblacks	Bob Dyce	Ryan Dinwiddie	Bob Dyce served as head coach of the Redblacks since being named interim head coach on October 1, 2022. While he led the team to the playoffs in 2024, the team disappointed the next season with a 4–14 record and Dyce was fired at the end of the season. He finished his tenure with Ottawa with an 18–39–1 record. After receiving permission to speak with Toronto Argonauts head coach, Ryan Dinwiddie, he was named both head coach and general manager of the Redblacks on November 5, 2025.
Toronto Argonauts	Ryan Dinwiddie	Mike Miller	Dinwiddie was the head coach of the Argonauts from 2021 to 2025 where he had a 51–35 record and led the franchise to two Grey Cup victories. After a difficult 2025 season where the team had a 5–13 record, he was approached by the Ottawa Redblacks and became their head coach and general manager. The team's quarterbacks coach, Mike Miller, was named as his replacement on December 2, 2025.

== Player movement ==
=== Free agency ===
The 2026 free agency period began on Tuesday, February 10, 2026, at 12:00 p.m. ET. Pending free agents and teams were able to negotiate offers for one week starting Sunday, February 1, 2026, and ending Sunday, February 8, 2026. All formal offers to a player during this time were sent to both the league and the players union and could not be rescinded.

== Regular season ==
=== Standings ===
West Division
Team	GP	W	L	Pts	PF	PA	Div	Stk	
Edmonton Elks	18	13	5	26	541	435	7–3	L1	Details
BC Lions	18	10	8	20	516	484	5–5	L2	Details
Saskatchewan Roughriders	18	10	8	20	486	473	5–5	W2	Details
Winnipeg Blue Bombers	18	9	9	18	475	492	4–6	W1	Details
Calgary Stampeders	18	9	9	18	632	587	4–6	W1	Details

East Division
Team	GP	W	L	Pts	PF	PA	Div	Stk	
Montreal Alouettes	18	14	4	28	624	476	8–0	W1	Details
Toronto Argonauts	18	9	9	18	517	528	4–4	L3	Details
Hamilton Tiger-Cats	18	6	12	12	443	523	3–5	W1	Details
Ottawa Redblacks	18	1	17	2	437	673	1–7	L1	Details

== Postseason ==
=== Bracket ===
October 31: Division semi-finals
East
E2	Toronto Argonauts	22
W4	Winnipeg Blue Bombers	25
West
W2	BC Lions	33
W3	Saskatchewan Roughriders	26

November 7: Division finals
E1	Montreal Alouettes	33
W4	Winnipeg Blue Bombers	23
W1	Edmonton Elks	28
W2	BC Lions	16

November 15: 113th Grey Cup; McMahon Stadium – Calgary
E1	Montreal Alouettes	30
W1	Edmonton Elks	37

== Attendance ==
Ranked from highest to lowest average home attendance.

Regular season
No.	Team	Home games	Total attendance	Average attendance	Percentage Change
1	Winnipeg Blue Bombers	10	321,356	32,136	-0.6%
2	Saskatchewan Roughriders	10	290,236	29,024	+2.1%
3	BC Lions	9	209,281	23,286	-13.9%
4	Edmonton Elks	9	201,786	22,421	+17.7%
5	Montreal Alouettes	9	191,143	21,238	+0.5%
6	Hamilton Tiger-Cats	10	204,822	20,482	-10.4%
7	Calgary Stampeders	9	182,043	20,227	-9.3%
8	Ottawa Redblacks	9	136,505	15,167	-16.4%
9	Toronto Argonauts	6	90,659	15,110	0%

== CFL rankings ==
	Pre	Wk 1	Wk 2	Wk 3	Wk 4	Wk 5	Wk 6	Wk 7	Wk 8	Wk 9	Wk 10	Wk 11	Wk 12	Wk 13	Wk 14	Wk 15	Wk 16	Wk 17	Wk 18
BC Lions	2	2	2	3	6	8	8	7	8	8	6	6	4	3	3	3	3	3	2
Calgary Stampeders	8	7	7	7	8	7	4	4	4	4	4	4	5	5	6	7	7	7	7
Edmonton Elks	5	5	5	5	4	1	2	2	2	2	2	3	2	2	2	2	1	2	3
Hamilton Tiger-Cats	4	4	4	4	3	4	6	8	7	7	8	8	7	8	8	8	8	8	8
Montreal Alouettes	3	3	3	2	2	2	1	1	1	1	1	1	1	1	1	1	2	1	1
Ottawa Redblacks	7	8	8	9	9	9	9	9	9	9	9	9	9	9	9	9	9	9	9
Saskatchewan Roughriders	1	1	1	1	1	3	3	3	3	3	3	2	3	4	5	4	5	6	6
Toronto Argonauts	9	9	9	8	7	5	5	6	6	6	5	5	8	7	7	6	6	5	4
Winnipeg Blue Bombers	6	6	6	6	5	6	7	5	5	5	6	7	6	6	4	5	4	4	5

Legend
Improvement in ranking
Drop in ranking
No change in ranking

== Broadcasting ==
In Canada, this is the final year of the league's exclusive contract with TSN (in English) and RDS (in French). Games will be broadcast in the United States by CBS Sports Network with a deal also set to expire after this season. Johnston stated in January 2026 that the league was seeking to finalize an extension with TSN prior to the start of the 2026 season, and that the league refused to consider any competitors' offers.

Outside of North America, the league's streaming platform, CFL+, will stream all regular season games for free (along with games not carried by CBS Sports Network in the United States). Most pre-season games will be streamed worldwide for free on CFL+. Radio broadcast rights belong to teams' local stations and SiriusXM.

== Award winners ==
=== CFL Players of the Week ===
Week	First	Second	Third
1	Justin Rankin RB (Edmonton)	Robert Kennedy III DB (Montreal)	Jake Ceresna DL (Winnipeg)
2	Trevor Harris QB (Saskatchewan)	Tyson Philpot WR (Montreal)	Davis Alexander QB (Montreal)
3	Bo Levi Mitchell QB (Hamilton)	Justin Rankin RB (Edmonton)	Kevin Mital WR (Toronto)
4	Tyson Philpot WR (Montreal)	Davis Alexander QB (Montreal)	Chad Kelly QB (Toronto)
5	Vernon Adams Jr. QB (Calgary)	KeeSean Johnson WR (Saskatchewan)	James Butler RB (BC)
6	Justin Rankin RB (Edmonton)	Tyson Philpot WR (Montreal)	Dru Brown QB (Winnipeg)
7	Davis Alexander QB (Montreal)	Travis Theis RB (Montreal)	Dedrick Mills RB (Calgary)
8	Cody Fajardo QB (Edmonton)	Tyreik McAllister RB (Calgary)	Travis Theis RB (Montreal)
9	Zander Horvath RB (BC)	Davis Alexander QB (Montreal)	Tyson Philpot WR (Montreal)
10	Tyson Philpot WR (Montreal)	KeeSean Johnson WR (Saskatchewan)	Damonte Coxie WR (Toronto)
11	J. J. Ross DB (Edmonton)	Cody Fajardo QB (Edmonton)	Zander Horvath RB (BC)
12	Kabion Ento DB (Montreal)	Davis Alexander QB (Montreal)	Nathan Rourke QB (BC)
13	Zander Horvath RB (BC)	Zach Collaros QB (Winnipeg)	KeeSean Johnson WR (Saskatchewan)
14	Tyrice Beverette DB (Montreal)	Dhel Duncan-Busby DB (Saskatchewan)	Trevor Harris QB (Saskatchewan)
15	David Ungerer WR (Toronto)	Tyrice Beverette DB (Montreal)	Keon Hatcher WR (BC)
16	Adarius Pickett LB (Toronto)	Jalen Philpot WR (Calgary)	Justin Hardy WR (Ottawa)
17	Nathan Rourke QB (BC)	Vernon Adams Jr. QB (Calgary)	Vincent Blanchard K (Edmonton)
18	Tyson Philpot WR (Montreal)	Kenny Lawler WR (Hamilton)	Vernon Adams Jr. QB (Calgary)
19	Malik Carney DL (Edmonton)	Davis Alexander QB (Montreal)	Zach Collaros QB (Winnipeg)
20	Bryson Barnes QB (Ottawa)	Ayden Eberhardt WR (Ottawa)	Ontaria Wilson WR (Winnipeg)
21	Dru Brown QB (Winnipeg)	Brady Oliveira RB (Winnipeg)	Dorian Singer WR (Winnipeg)

=== CFL Players of the Month ===
Month	First	Second	Third
June	Tyson Philpot WR (Montreal)	Justin Rankin RB (Edmonton)	Davis Alexander QB (Montreal)
July	Davis Alexander QB (Montreal)	Travis Theis RB (Montreal)	Cody Fajardo QB (Edmonton)
August	Zander Horvath RB (BC)	KeeSean Johnson WR (Saskatchewan)	Tyson Philpot WR (Montreal)
September	Nathan Rourke QB (BC)	Adarius Pickett LB (Toronto)	Tyrice Beverette LB (Montreal)
October	Davis Alexander QB (Montreal)	Tyson Philpot WR (Montreal)	Dorian Singer WR (Winnipeg)

== 2026 All-CFL teams ==
=== 2026 All-CFL team ===
==== Offence ====
- QB – Davis Alexander, Montreal Alouettes
- RB – Brady Oliveira, Winnipeg Blue Bombers
- FB/TE – Skyler Griffith, Edmonton Elks
- R – Tyson Philpot, Montreal Alouettes
- R – KeeSean Johnson, Saskatchewan Roughriders
- R – Tyler Snead, Montreal Alouettes
- R – Damonte Coxie, Toronto Argonauts
- R – Austin Mack, Edmonton Elks
- OT – Nick Callender, Montreal Alouettes
- OT – Jarell Broxton, Winnipeg Blue Bombers
- OG – Pier-Olivier Lestage, Montreal Alouettes
- OG – Christy Nkanu, Calgary Stampeders
- C – Logan Ferland, Saskatchewan Roughriders

==== Defence ====
- DT – Ralph Holley, Toronto Argonauts
- DT – Jake Ceresna, Winnipeg Blue Bombers
- DE – Malik Carney, Edmonton Eks
- DE – Clarence Hicks, Calgary Stampeders
- LB – Darnell Sankey, BC Lions
- LB – Tyrice Beverette, Montreal Alouettes
- CLB – Adarius Pickett, Toronto Argonauts
- CB – Tyrell Ford, Edmonton Elks
- CB – Lorenzo Burns, Montreal Alouettes
- HB – Kordell Jackson, Edmonton Elks
- HB – Evan Holm, Winnipeg Blue Bombers
- S – Jackson Findlay, BC Lions

==== Special teams ====
- K – Vincent Blanchard, Edmonton Elks
- P – Jake Julien, Edmonton Elks
- ST – Trey Vaval, Winnipeg Blue Bombers
- LS – Louis-Philippe Bourassa, Montreal Alouettes

=== 2026 Western All-CFL team ===
==== Offence ====
- QB – Nathan Rourke, BC Lions
- RB – Brady Oliveira, Winnipeg Blue Bombers
- FB/TE – Skyler Griffith, Edmonton Elks
- R – KeeSean Johnson, Saskatchewan Roughriders
- R – Austin Mack, Edmonton Elks
- R – Keon Hatcher, BC Lions
- R – Jalen Philpot, Calgary Stampeders
- R – Kian Schaffer-Baker, Saskatchewan Roughriders
- OT – Jarell Broxton, Winnipeg Blue Bombers
- OT – Jermarcus Hardrick, Saskatchewan Roughriders
- OG – Carter O'Donnell, Edmonton Elks
- OG – Christy Nkanu, Calgary Stampeders
- C – Logan Ferland, Saskatchewan Roughriders

==== Defence ====
- DT – Jaylon Hutchings, Calgary Stampeders
- DT – Jake Ceresna, Winnipeg Blue Bombers
- DE – Malik Carney, Edmonton Eks
- DE – Clarence Hicks, Calgary Stampeders
- LB – Jameer Thurman, Saskatchewan Roughriders
- LB – Darnell Sankey, BC Lions
- CLB – Deontai Williams, BC Lions
- CB – Tyrell Ford, Edmonton Elks
- CB – J.J. Ross, Edmonton Elks
- HB – Kordell Jackson, Edmonton Elks
- HB – Evan Holm, Winnipeg Blue Bombers
- S – Jackson Findlay, BC Lions

==== Special teams ====
- K – Vincent Blanchard, Edmonton Elks
- P – Jake Julien, Edmonton Elks
- ST – Trey Vaval, Winnipeg Blue Bombers
- LS – Mike Benson, Saskatchewan Roughriders

=== 2026 Eastern All-CFL team ===
==== Offence ====
- QB – Davis Alexander, Montreal Alouettes
- RB – Travis Theis, Montreal Alouettes
- FB/TE – Jacob Mason, Montreal Alouettes
- R – Tyson Philpot, Montreal Alouettes
- R – Damonte Coxie, Toronto Argonauts
- R – David Ungerer III, Toronto Argonauts
- R – Ayden Eberhardt, Ottawa Redblacks
- R – Tyler Snead, Montreal Alouettes
- OT – Tiger Shanks, Montreal Alouettes
- OT – Nick Callender, Montreal Alouettes
- OG – Brandon Revenberg, Hamilton Tiger-Cats
- OG – Pier-Olivier Lestage, Montreal Alouettes
- C – Peter Nicastro, Toronto Argonauts

==== Defence ====
- DT – Ralph Holley, Toronto Argonauts
- DT – Mustafa Johnson, Montreal Alouettes
- DE – Philip Ossai, Hamilton Tiger-Cats
- DE – Shawn Lemon, Toronto Argonauts
- LB – Tyrice Beverette, Montreal Alouettes
- LB – Isaac Darkangelo, Toronto Argonauts
- CLB – Adarius Pickett, Toronto Argonauts
- CB – Lorenzo Burns, Montreal Alouettes
- CB – Benjie Franklin, Toronto Argonauts
- HB – Robert Kennedy III, Montreal Alouettes
- HB – Wesley Sutton, Montreal Alouettes
- S – Alonzo Addae, Ottawa Redblacks

==== Special teams ====
- K – José Maltos Díaz, Montreal Alouettes
- P – James Burnip, Toronto Argonauts
- ST – Janarion Grant, Toronto Argonauts
- LS – Louis-Philippe Bourassa, Montreal Alouettes

== 2026 CFL awards ==
Beginning this season, the CFL restructured their awards process with respect to league award nominees and presentations. While each team would continue to vote upon team award winners, each player who received a vote in this process would also be eligible for the associated league award as opposed to only the team award winner being eligible. Additionally, each award will have three finalists, regardless of division, instead of one nominee from each division. The CFL will also forgo an awards ceremony and instead award players in surprise presentations. Furthermore, the complete ballots of all 56 voters will be disclosed.

Award	Finalists			Winner
George Reed Most Outstanding Player	Davis Alexander (Montreal)	Cody Fajardo (Edmonton)	Tyson Philpot (Montreal)	Davis Alexander (Montreal)
Most Outstanding Canadian	Brady Oliveira (Winnipeg)	Tyson Philpot (Montreal)	Nathan Rourke (BC)	Tyson Philpot (Montreal)
Most Outstanding Defensive Player	Clarence Hicks (Calgary)	Adarius Pickett (Toronto)	Darnell Sankey (BC)	Darnell Sankey (BC)
Most Outstanding Offensive Lineman	Jarell Broxton (Winnipeg)	Nick Callender (Montreal)	Pier-Olivier Lestage (Montreal)	Jarell Broxton (Winnipeg)
Most Outstanding Special Teams Player	Vincent Blanchard (Edmonton)	Tyreik McAllister (Calgary)	Trey Vaval (Winnipeg)	Trey Vaval (Winnipeg)
Most Outstanding Rookie	Tyler Kahmann (Toronto)	Parker McKenna (BC)	Major Williams (Winnipeg)	Tyler Kahmann (Toronto)
Coach of the Year	Mark Kilam (Edmonton)	Jason Maas (Montreal)	Buck Pierce (BC)	
