= Winnipeg Blue Bombers all-time records and statistics =

The following is a list of Winnipeg Blue Bombers all-time records and statistics current to the 2026 CFL season. Each category lists the top five players, where known, except for when the fifth place player is tied in which case all players with the same number are listed.

== Tenure ==
Most games played

- 394 – Bob Cameron (1980–2002)
- 293 – Troy Westwood (1991–2007, 2009)
- 249 – Chris Walby (1981–1996)
- 223 – Jake Thomas (2012–2019, 2021–2025)
- 220 – Stan Mikawos (1982–1996)

Most seasons played

- 23 – Bob Cameron (1980–2002)
- 18 – Troy Westwood (1991–2007, 2009)
- 16 – Bill Ceretti (1933–1949)
- 16 – Chris Walby (1981–1996)
- 15 – Roger Savoie (1951–1965)
- 15 – Stan Mikawos (1982–1996)

Most consecutive games played

- 353 – Bob Cameron (1980–2000)
- 279 – Troy Westwood (1991–2007)

== Scoring ==
Most points – career

- 2,748 – Troy Westwood (1991–2007, 2009)
- 1,840 – Trevor Kennerd (1980–1991)
- 890 – Milt Stegall (1995–2008)
- 848 – Sergio Castillo (2015, 2021, 2023–2026)
- 802 – Justin Medlock (2016–2019)

Most points – season

- 227 – Justin Medlock – 2016
- 226 – Justin Medlock – 2017
- 213 – Troy Westwood – 1994
- 209 – Troy Westwood – 1993
- 208 – Sergio Castillo – 2026

Most points – game

- 36 – Bob McNamara – versus BC Lions, October 13, 1956
- 30 – Ernie Pitts – versus Saskatchewan Roughriders, August 29, 1959
- 24 – Seven players, nine times

Most touchdowns – career

- 147 – Milt Stegall (1995–2008)
- 79 – Charles Roberts (2001–2008)
- 75 – Leo Lewis (1955–1966)
- 63 – Gerry James (1952–1963)
- 62 – James Murphy (1983–1990)

Most touchdowns – season

- 23 – Milt Stegall – 2002
- 19 – Gerry James – 2002
- 17 – Milt Stegall – 2005
- 16 – Ernie Pitts – 1959
- 16 – Ronald Williams – 1997
- 16 – Charles Roberts – 2007
- 16 – Dalton Schoen – 2022

Most touchdowns – game

- 6 – Bob McNamara – versus BC Lions, October 13, 1956
- 5 – Ernie Pitts – versus Saskatchewan Roughriders, August 29, 1959
- 4 – Seven players, nine times

Most rushing touchdowns – career

- 64 – Charles Roberts (2001–2008)
- 57 – Gerry James (1952–1963)
- 48 – Leo Lewis (1955–1966)
- 44 – Willard Reaves (1983–1987)
- 32 – Chris Streveler (2018–2019, 2024)

Most rushing touchdowns – season

- 18 – Gerry James – 1957
- 16 – Ronald Williams – 1997
- 16 – Charles Roberts – 2007
- 15 – Robert Mimbs – 1991
- 14 – Willard Reaves – 1984

Most rushing touchdowns – game

- 4 – Bob McNamara – at BC Lions, October 13, 1956
- 4 – Willard Reaves – versus Hamilton Tiger-Cats, September 15, 1984
- 4 – Tim Jessie – at Ottawa Rough Riders, July 25, 1989
- 4 – Charles Roberts – versus BC Lions, September 8, 2002
- 4 – Charles Roberts – at Edmonton Eskimos, June 28, 2007

Most receiving touchdowns – career

- 144 – Milt Stegall (1995–2008)
- 61 – James Murphy (1983–1990)
- 54 – Ernie Pitts (1957–1969)
- 48 – Joe Poplawski (1978–1986)
- 46 – Jeff Boyd (1983–1987)
- 46 – Rick House (1979–1991)
- 46 – Terrence Edwards (2007–2013)

Most receiving touchdowns – season

- 23 – Milt Stegall – 2002
- 18 – Gerald Alphin – 1994
- 17 – Milt Stegall – 2005
- 16 – Ernie Pitts – 1959
- 16 – Dalton Schoen – 2022

Most receiving touchdowns – game

- 5 – Ernie Pitts – versus Saskatchewan Roughriders, August 29, 1959
- 4 – Alfred Jackson – versus Edmonton Eskimos, July 14, 1994
- 4 – Gerald Alphin – at Shreveport Pirates, October 8, 1994
- 4 – Arland Bruce – versus Calgary Stampeders, August 23, 2002
- 4 – Milt Stegall – at Saskatchewan Roughriders, October 6, 2002
- 4 – Milt Stegall – versus BC Lions, October 10, 2005

== Passing ==
Most passing yards – career

- 29,623 – Dieter Brock (1974–1983)
- 22,214 – Zach Collaros (2019, 2021–2026)
- 20,175 – Khari Jones (2000–2004)
- 18,116 – Kevin Glenn (2004–2008, 2016)
- 16,470 – Ken Ploen (1957–1967)

Most passing yards – season

- 5,334 – Khari Jones – 2002
- 5,114 – Kevin Glenn – 2007
- 4,796 – Dieter Brock – 1981
- 4,686 – Tom Clements – 1987
- 4,682 – Matt Dunigan – 1993

Most passing yards – game

- 713 – Matt Dunigan – versus Edmonton Eskimos, July 14, 1994
- 464 – Tom Burgess – versus Saskatchewan Roughriders, September 8, 1991
- 462 – Khari Jones – versus Calgary Stampeders, August 23, 2002
- 454 – Kerwin Bell – at BC Lions, July 29, 1999
- 454 – Sean Salisbury – versus BC Lions, September 10, 1989

Most pass completions – career

- 2,167 – Dieter Brock (1974–1983)
- 1,693 – Zach Collaros (2019, 2021–2026)
- 1,416 – Khari Jones (2000–2004)
- 1,328 – Kevin Glenn (2004–2008, 2016)
- 1,312 – Matt Nichols (2015–2019)

Most pass completions – season

- 411 – Matt Nichols – 2017
- 388 – Kevin Glenn – 2007
- 382 – Khari Jones – 2002
- 374 – Kerwin Bell – 1999
- 354 – Dieter Brock – 1981

Most pass completions – game

- 41 – Dieter Brock – at Ottawa Rough Riders, October 3, 1981
- 39 – Khari Jones – at BC Lions, September 27, 2002
- 35 – Matt Nichols – versus Ottawa Redblacks, October 29, 2016
- 35 – Matt Nichols – at Saskatchewan Roughriders, September 3, 2017
- 34 – Matt Nichols – at Montreal Alouettes, July 27, 2017
- 34 – Zach Collaros – versus Calgary Stampeders, July 4, 2025

Most consecutive pass completions – game

- 19 – Matt Nichols – versus Ottawa Redblacks, July 19, 2019
- 16 – Dieter Brock – at Ottawa Rough Riders, October 3, 1981

Most pass attempts – career

- 3,777 – Dieter Brock (1974–1983)
- 2,405 – Zach Collaros (2019, 2021–2026)
- 2,346 – Khari Jones (2000–2004)
- 2,183 – Kevin Glenn (2004–2008, 2016)
- 1,930 – Matt Nichols (2015–2019)

Most pass attempts – season

- 630 – Kerwin Bell – 1999
- 621 – Kevin Glenn – 2007
- 620 – Khari Jones – 2002
- 600 – Matt Dunigan – 1993
- 595 – Sean Salisbury – 1989

Most pass attempts – game

- 55 – Sammy Garza – at Ottawa Rough Riders, June 28, 1995
- 55 – Khari Jones – at BC Lions, September 27, 2002
- 54 – Kevin Glenn – at Toronto Argonauts, September 23, 2007

Highest pass completions percentage – career (minimum 750 attempts)

- 70.40 – Zach Collaros (2019, 2021–26)
- 67.98 – Matt Nichols (2015–2019)
- 66.55 – Drew Willy (2014–2016)
- 63.08 – Buck Pierce (2010–2013)
- 60.83 – Kevin Glenn (2004–2008, 2016)

Highest pass completions percentage – season (minimum 175 attempts)

- 72.57 – Zach Collaros – 2025
- 71.25 – Matt Nichols – 2019
- 70.98 – Matt Nichols – 2017
- 70.45 – Zach Collaros – 2026
- 70.23 – Zach Collaros – 2021

Highest pass completions percentage – game (minimum 20 attempts)

- 88.0 – Drew Willy (22/25) – at Saskatchewan Roughriders, June 27, 2015

Most passing touchdowns – career

- 187 – Dieter Brock (1974–1983)
- 141 – Zach Collaros (2019, 2021–2026)
- 139 – Khari Jones (2000–2004)
- 119 – Ken Ploen (1957–1967)
- 104 – Jack Jacobs (1950–1954)

Most passing touchdowns – season

- 46 – Khari Jones – 2002
- 37 – Zach Collaros – 2022
- 36 – Matt Dunigan – 1993
- 35 – Tom Clements – 1987
- 34 – Jack Jacobs – 1952

Most passing touchdowns – game

- 7 – Jim Van Pelt – at Saskatchewan Roughriders, August 29, 1959
- 6 – Jack Jacobs – at Calgary Stampeders, October 4, 1952
- 6 – Sean Salisbury – versus BC Lions, September 10, 1989
- 6 – Zach Collaros – versus Edmonton Elks, September 27, 2024

== Rushing ==
Most rushing yards – career

- 9,987 – Charles Roberts (2001–2008)
- 8,861 – Leo Lewis (1955–1966)
- 6,973 – Brady Oliveira (2019, 2021–2026)
- 5,926 – Willard Reaves (1983–1987)
- 5,736 – Jim Washington (1974–1979)

Most rushing yards – season

- 1,769 – Robert Mimbs – 1991
- 1,733 – Willard Reaves – 1984
- 1,624 – Charles Roberts – 2005
- 1,609 – Charles Roberts – 2006
- 1,554 – Charles Roberts – 2003

Most rushing yards – game

- 260 – Fred Reid – at BC Lions, August 21, 2009
- 249 – Blaise Bryant – at Hamilton Tiger-Cats, September 17, 1994
- 221 – Willard Reaves – versus Ottawa Rough Riders, September 17, 1984
- 212 – Ronald Williams – at Saskatchewan Roughriders, October 24, 1997
- 200 – Willard Reaves – versus Ottawa Rough Riders, August 8, 1985

Most rushing attempts – career

- 1,853 – Charles Roberts (2001–2008)
- 1,351 – Leo Lewis (1955–1966)
- 1,233 – Brady Oliveira (2019, 2021–2026)
- 1,110 – Willard Reaves (1983–1987)
- 991 – Gerry James (1952–1963)

Most rushing attempts – season

- 326 – Robert Mimbs – 1991
- 304 – Willard Reaves – 1984
- 303 – Charles Roberts – 2006
- 300 – Charles Roberts – 2004
- 290 – Charles Roberts – 2005

Most rushing attempts – game

- 34 – Blaise Bryant – at Hamilton Tiger-Cats, September 17, 1994
- 32 – Charles Roberts – versus Toronto Argonauts, June 23, 2006

== Receiving ==
Most receiving yards – career

- 15,153 – Milt Stegall (1995–2008)
- 9,036 – James Murphy (1983–1990)
- 8,341 – Joe Poplawski (1978–1986)
- 7,200 – Terrence Edwards (2007–2013)
- 6,385 – Nic Demski (2018–2026)

Most receiving yards – season

- 1,862 – Milt Stegall – 2002
- 1,746 – James Murphy – 1986
- 1,624 – Gerald Wilcox – 1994
- 1,616 – Milt Stegall – 1997
- 1,499 – Milt Stegall – 2000

Most receiving yards – game

- 308 – Alfred Jackson – versus Edmonton Eskimos, July 14, 1994
- 254 – Milt Stegall – at Edmonton Eskimos, July 20, 2006
- 240 – David Williams – versus Edmonton Eskimos, July 14, 1994
- 234 – Milt Stegall – versus BC Lions, October 10, 2005
- 233 – Milt Stegall – at BC Lions, July 29, 1999

Most receptions – career

- 854 – Milt Stegall (1995–2008)
- 573 – James Murphy (1983–1990)
- 549 – Joe Poplawski (1978–1986)
- 491 – Nic Demski (2018–2026)
- 469 – Terrence Edwards (2007–2013)

Most receptions – season

- 116 – James Murphy – 1986
- 111 – Gerald Wilcox – 1994
- 106 – Milt Stegall – 2002
- 105 – Andrew Harris – 2017
- 100 – Eugene Goodlow – 1981

Most receptions – game

- 15 – Eugene Goodlow – versus Calgary Stampeders, November 1, 1981
- 13 – James Murphy – at BC Lions, Jun 26, 1986
- 13 – Derick Armstrong – at Saskatchewan Roughriders – September 2, 2007
- 13 – Ontaria Wilson – versus Calgary Stampeders – July 12, 2024

== Yards from scrimmage ==
Most yards from scrimmage, career

- 15,208 – Milt Stegall (55 yards rushing, 15,153 yards receiving)
- 13,328 – Charles Roberts (9,987 yards rushing, 3,341 yards receiving)
- 13,112 – Leo Lewis (8,861 yards rushing, 4,251 yards receiving)
- 9,151 – Brady Oliveira (6,973 yards rushing, 2,178 yards receiving)
- 9,123 – James Murphy (87 yards rushing, 9,036 yards receiving)

Most yards from scrimmage, one season

- 2,207 – Robert Mimbs (1991, 1769 yards rushing, 438 yards receiving)
- 2,140 – Willard Reaves (1984, 1,733 yards rushing, 407 yards receiving)
- 2,102 – Charles Roberts (2003, 1,554 yards rushing, 548 yards receiving)
- 2,098 – Charles Roberts (2005, 1,624 yards rushing, 474 yards receiving)
- 2,020 – Charles Roberts (2006, 1,609 yards rushing, 411 yards receiving)

Most yards from scrimmage, one game

- 308 – Alfred Jackson (1994, 308 yards receiving)
- 266 – Fred Reid (2009, 260 yards rushing, 6 yards receiving)
- 263 – Blaise Bryant (1994, 249 yards rushing, 14 yards receiving)

== Interceptions ==
Most interceptions – career

- 47 – Rod Hill (1988–1992)
- 34 – Norm Rauhaus (1956–1967)
- 31 – Gord Rowland (1954–1963)
- 27 – Reggie Pierson (1978–1983)
- 27 – Less Browne (1989–1991)
- 27 – Ken Hailey (1983–1991)

Most interceptions – season

- 14 – Less Browne – 1990
- 13 – Roy Bennett – 1987
- 12 – Rod Hill – 1990
- 12 – Rod Hill – 1989
- 10 – Ken Ploen – 1959
- 10 – Less Browne – 1991

Most interceptions – game

- 5 – Rod Hill – versus Edmonton Eskimos, September 9, 1990
- 4 – Peter Ribbins – versus BC Lions, August 17, 1972

== Tackles ==
- Note: Tackles were first recorded in 1987, but there was no differentiation between Defensive and Special Teams tackles. Those categorical differences were added in 1991.

Most defensive tackles – career

- 607 – Greg Battle (1987–1993, 1997–1998)
- 430 – Adam Bighill (2018–2019, 2021–2024)
- 428 – Darryl Sampson (1986–1995)
- 426 – Doug Brown (2001–2011)
- 378 – James West (1985–1992)

Most defensive tackles – season

- 124 – Greg Battle – 1989
- 114 – Greg Battle – 1990
- 112 – Barrin Simpson – 2007
- 105 – Adam Bighill – 2018
- 102 – Khalil Bass – 2015
- 102 – Tony Jones – 2025

Most defensive tackles – game

- 14 – Barrin Simpson – versus Toronto Argonauts, July 24, 2009
- 14 – Ian Wild – versus Montreal Alouettes, August 22, 2014
- 13 – Ken Hailey – at Hamilton Tiger-Cats, August 14, 1987
- 13 – Greg Battle – versus Saskatchewan Roughriders, September 23, 1990
- 13 – K.D. Williams – at Toronto Argonauts, October 9, 1995

Most special teams tackles – career

- 184 – Wade Miller (1995–2005)
- 124 – Brendan Rogers (1991–1995)
- 110 – Mike Miller (2017–2019, 2021–2022)
- 95 – Nick Hallett (2019–2026)
- 92 – Neil McKinlay (2004–2009)

Most special teams tackles – season

- 37 – Wade Miller – 1999
- 35 – Wade Miller – 1997
- 34 – Brendan Rogers – 1994
- 31 – Brendan Rogers – 1993

Most special teams tackles – game

- 7 – Brendan Rogers – at BC Lions, September 23, 1994
- 7 – Mike Miller – at Ottawa Redblacks, July 5, 2019
- 6 – Wade Miller – versus Saskatchewan Roughriders, October 24, 1997
- 6 – Derrick Doggett – versus Montreal Alouettes, August 15, 2009
- 5 – Kerfalla Exumé – at BC Lions, June 15, 2019

== Quarterback sacks ==
Most sacks – career

- 98 – Tyrone Jones (1983–1991)
- 59 – Tony Norman (1986–1995)
- 53 – Willie Jefferson (2019, 2021–2026)
- 52 – Doug Brown (2001–2011)
- 47 – Elfrid Payton (1990–1993, 2000, 2004)
- 47 – Gavin Walls (2005–2009)

Most sacks – season

- 22 – Elfrid Payton – 1993
- 20.5 – Tyrone Jones – 1984
- 17.5 – Tyrone Jones – 1983
- 17 – Jamaal Westerman – 2015

Most sacks – game

- 4.5 – Tyrone Jones – versus BC Lions, July 22, 1984
- 4 – Charlie Clemons – versus Saskatchewan Roughriders, October 13, 1995
- 4 – Gavin Walls – versus BC Lions, October 10, 2005

== Field goals ==
Most field goals – career

- 617 – Troy Westwood (1991–2007, 2009)
- 394 – Trevor Kennerd (1980–1991)
- 215 – Sergio Castillo (2015, 2021, 2023–2026)
- 195 – Justin Medlock (2016–2019)
- 148 – Bernie Ruoff (1975–1979)

Most field goals – season

- 60 – Justin Medlock – 2016
- 56 – Justin Medlock – 2017
- 53 – Sergio Castillo – 2026
- 51 – Sergio Castillo – 2024
- 48 – Sergio Castillo – 2025

Most field goals – game

- 7 – Trevor Kennerd – versus Toronto Argonauts, October 11, 1981
- 7 – Justin Medlock – at Saskatchewan Roughriders, September 4, 2016
- 7 – Justin Medlock – at BC Lions, October 14, 2016
- 7 – Justin Medlock – versus BC Lions, October 28, 2017

Highest field goal accuracy – career (minimum 75 attempts)

- 85.5% (195/228) – Justin Medlock (2016–2019)
- 83.7% (215/257) – Sergio Castillo (2015, 2021, 2023–2026)
- 82.0% (114/139) – Justin Palardy (2010–2013)
- 72.3% (617/853) – Troy Westwood (1991–2007, 2009)
- 71.9% (82/114) – Alexis Serna (2008–2010)

Highest field goal accuracy – season (minimum 30 attempts)

- 90.2% (46/51) – Sergio Castillo – 2023
- 89.4% (42/47) – Justin Medlock – 2018
- 88.2% (60/68) – Justin Medlock – 2016
- 87.0% (40/46) – Lirim Hajrullahu – 2014
- 86.7% (26/30) – Justin Palardy – 2010
- 86.7% (39/45) – Justin Palardy – 2012

Longest field goal

- 63 – Sergio Castillo – at Calgary Stampeders, August 9, 2025
- 60 – Sergio Castillo – at Calgary Stampeders, June 29, 2024
- 60 – Sergio Castillo – versus BC Lions, August 1, 2024
- 58 – Bernie Ruoff – versus Calgary Stampeders, September 14, 1980
- 58 – Justin Medlock – versus Montreal Alouettes, June 24, 2016
- 58 – Sergio Castillo – versus Calgary Stampeders, July 18, 2025

Most consecutive field goals

- 28 – Justin Medlock (September 30, 2016 – July 13, 2017)
- 26 – Sergio Castillo (July 24, 2026 – September 12, 2026)
- 22 – Justin Medlock (July 14, 2016 – September 4, 2016)
- 16 – Troy Westwood (1996)
