= Kyle Walters =

Canadian football player (born 1973)

- Walters at Winnipeg's 2019 Grey Cup parade

Winnipeg Blue Bombers
- Title: General manager

Personal information
- Born: July 23, 1973 (age 53); St. Thomas, Ontario, Canada
- Listed height: 5 ft 11 in (1.80 m)
- Listed weight: 175 lb (79 kg)

Career information
- Position: Defensive back (No. 7)
- College: Guelph
- CFL draft: 1996: 2nd round, 10th overall pick

Career history

Playing
- 1997–2003: Hamilton Tiger-Cats

Coaching
- 2004–2005: Guelph Gryphons (DC)
- 2006–2009: Guelph Gryphons (HC)
- 2010–2012: Winnipeg Blue Bombers (STC)

Operations
- 2013: Winnipeg Blue Bombers (Ass. GM)
- 2013–present: Winnipeg Blue Bombers (GM)

Awards and highlights
- Grey Cup champion (1999, 2019, 2021)

Kyle Walters (born July 23, 1973) is a Canadian former professional football defensive back and is currently the general manager for the Winnipeg Blue Bombers of the Canadian Football League.

== Playing career ==
=== University ===
Walters played CIAU football for the Guelph Gyphons from 1992-1996. He was named team captain in 1996, and captured the Yates Championship in 1992 and 1996.

=== Professional ===
Walters was drafted by the Hamilton Tiger-Cats in the second round (10th overall) in the 1996 CFL Draft.

He played for seven seasons for the Hamilton Tiger-Cats and won a Grey Cup championship as a player with the team in 1999.

== University coaching career ==
Following his retirement as a player, Walters became a coach at Guelph, holding the title of defensive coordinator from 2004 to 2005. From 2006 to 2009, he was the team's head coach where he posted a 13-18-1 record.

== Winnipeg Blue Bombers ==
=== Assistant Coach ===
On March 1, 2010, the Winnipeg Blue Bombers announced that Walters had been hired as the team's special teams coordinator.

In 2011, he added the title of Canadian College Draft Coordinator.

=== Management ===
==== Assistant General Manager ====
On December 5, 2012, Walters was named the Blue Bombers' Assistant General Manager and Director of Canadian Scouting.

==== General Manager ====
===== 2013 =====
In 2013, following a disappointing 1–5 start, the Blue Bombers fired general manager Joe Mack in August, and Walters was named acting general manager. In this role, Walters acquired Canadian offensive lineman Patrick Neufeld from the Saskatchewan Roughriders. The team went 2-10 under Walters, and ultimately missed the CFL playoffs for the second consecutive season.

Following the season, Wade Miller, who had been the team's Acting CEO since August, became the team's President and CEO, and on November 26, he named Walters the Blue Bombers' General Manager. In early December, Walters made three hirings that laid a foundation of continuity in the football operations that would last over a decade. On December 2, the hirings of Danny McManus (Assistant General Manager, Director of U.S. Scouting) and Ted Goveia (Assistant General Manager, Director of Player Personnel) were announced. On December 4, the hiring of Head Coach Mike O'Shea was announced. Throughout their tenure, Walters has preferred to do the scouting for the team and work in the background, while O'Shea has done most of the media interviews for the team. With the football operations finalized, the Blue Bombers started to gradually rebuild their team.

===== 2014 =====
In 2014, the Blue Bombers acquired Drew Willy from Saskatchewan to be the team's starting quarterback. Buck Pierce, who had been a Blue Bomber quarterback from 2010 to 2013, had been traded to the BC Lions late in 2013. He was brought back to be the team's running backs coach. The team started 5–1, but ultimately finished 7–11 and out of the playoffs for the third consecutive season.

===== 2015 =====
In 2015, the Blue Bombers brought Richie Hall in to be the defensive coordinator. Offensive lineman Stanley Bryant was acquired from the Grey Cup champion Calgary Stampeders. Quarterback Matt Nichols was acquired from Edmonton during the season. After a 3–3 start, the Blue Bombers finished 5–13 and out of the playoffs for the fourth consecutive season.

===== 2016 =====
In 2016, Winnipeg signed Paul LaPolice to be their offensive coordinator. LaPolice had been the offensive coordinator in Winnipeg from 2002 to 2003, and head coach from 2010 to 2012, when he was fired during the season. As head coach, Lapolice brought Walters in to be the team's special teams coordinator, and the team went to the Grey Cup in 2011. Offensive lineman Jermarcus Hardrick was acquired from Saskatchewan, as was receiver Weston Dressler. Kicker Justin Medlock was acquired from Hamilton. Running back Andrew Harris, a Winnipeg native, was signed after playing for several years with the BC Lions.

After a 1–4 start, the Blue Bombers replaced Willy with Nichols at quarterback, and the team finished 11–7, third place in the West Division. Unfortunately, they lost to the BC Lions in the West Semi-Final. Following the season, Walters and O'Shea, who were in the final year of their respective contracts, agreed to contract extensions (Walters through 2020 and O'Shea through 2019).

===== 2017 =====
In 2017, the Blue Bombers improved to 12–6, second place in the West, but lost to Edmonton in the West Semi-Final. Defensive lineman Jackson Jeffcoat and defensive back Brandon Alexander were two noteworthy acquisitions by the team.

===== 2018 =====
In 2018, Winnipeg won the West Semi-Final in Saskatchewan, but lost the West Final to Calgary. Linebacker Adam Bighill and receiver Nic Demski were signed. Rookie quarterback Chris Streveler started the first three games of the season while Nichols was injured.

===== 2019 =====
In 2019, defensive lineman Willie Jefferson and receiver Rasheed Bailey were signed, and receiver Kenny Lawler became a regular contributor. Brady Oliveira was drafted. After nine games, Nichols was leading the CFL in touchdown passes (15) and passer rating (107.2), but suffered an upper-body injury in Week 10 against the BC Lions which sidelined him for the rest of the season. Streveler started a number of games, but was playing injured late in the season. On October 9, just prior to the trade deadline, the Blue Bombers acquired quarterback Zach Collaros from Toronto.

In the West Semi-Final, Winnipeg defeated Calgary on the road, then defeated Saskatchewan in the West Final on the road. In the 107th Grey Cup, Winnipeg defeated the Hamilton Tiger-Cats 33–12, which ended the Blue Bombers' 29 year Grey Cup drought. Walters' contract was extended through 2023, while O'Shea's was extended through 2022.

===== 2020 =====
The 2020 season was cancelled due to the COVID-19 pandemic.

===== 2021 =====
In 2021, the Blue Bombers were able to maintain a roster largely intact following the hiatus 2020 season. They finished first place in the West Division with a league-best 11–3 record, and went undefeated at home. This was the first time they finished first place in the West Division since 1972; They had finished first place in the East Division several times over the years. The Blue Bombers hosted the Saskatchewan Roughriders as they had in the 1972 West Final, but unlike that year, the Blue Bombers defeated the Roughriders 21–17. This victory allowed the Blue Bombers to qualify for their second consecutive Grey Cup appearance, something the team had not done since 1992–1993. Winnipeg would once again defeat Hamilton in the 108th Grey Cup, this time played at Hamilton's home stadium, 33–25 in overtime. This was the last game Andrew Harris would play for the Blue Bombers.

===== 2022 =====
In 2022, the Blue Bombers once again finished with the best record in the CFL, this time 15–3. They would host BC in the West Final, defeating them 28–20. The Blue Bombers would qualify for their third consecutive Grey Cup appearance, something not done since 1957–1959. The Blue Bombers lost to the Toronto Argonauts in the 109th Grey Cup game 24–23. Andrew Harris, who had signed with Toronto in the offseason, was a contributor to this result.

===== 2023 =====
In 2023, the Blue Bombers finished 14–4, good for first place in the West Division for the third consecutive season, but second in the league to the defending Grey Cup champion, Toronto Argonauts, who finished 16–2. Winnipeg defeated BC in the West Final for the second consecutive season, qualifying them for their fourth consecutive Grey Cup appearance. In the 110th Grey Cup game, the Blue Bombers lost on a last second touchdown to the Montreal Alouettes.

After the season, Walters signed a contract extension, keeping him in Winnipeg through the 2025 season.

===== 2024 =====
In 2024, Winnipeg started 0–4 and 2–6. In the team's ninth game, they shutout the BC Lions 25–0 at home, and held the Lions to four first downs for the entire game. In the team's 10th game of the season, after a bye week, Winnipeg defeated BC once again. The Blue Bombers finished with a winning record for the eighth consecutive season, first in the West Division for the fourth consecutive season, and appeared in the West Final for the sixth consecutive season. In the West Final, Winnipeg defeated Saskatchewan 38–22 en route to their fifth consecutive Grey Cup appearance, but lost the 111th Grey Cup game to Toronto for the second time in three years.

===== 2025 =====
In 2025, the Blue Bombers finished 10–8, good enough for the crossover the East Division playoffs. The team lost to Montreal in the East Semi-Final.

== CFL GM record ==
Team	Year	Regular season					Postseason		
Team	Year	Won	Lost	Ties	Win %	Finish	Won	Lost	Result
WPG	2013	2	10	0	.166	4th in East Division	-	-	Interim - Failed to Qualify
WPG	2014	7	11	0	.388	5th in West Division	-	-	Failed to Qualify
WPG	2015	5	13	0	.278	4th in West Division	-	-	Failed to Qualify
WPG	2016	11	7	0	.611	3rd in West Division	0	1	Lost in Division Semi-Finals
WPG	2017	12	6	0	.667	2nd in West Division	0	1	Lost in Division Semi-Finals
WPG	2018	10	8	0	.556	3rd in West Division	1	1	Lost in Division Final
WPG	2019	11	7	0	.611	3rd in West Division	3	0	Won 107th Grey Cup
WPG	2020	-	-	-	-	-	-	-	Season Cancelled
WPG	2021	11	3	0	.786	1st in West Division	2	0	Won 108th Grey Cup
WPG	2022	15	3	0	.833	1st in West Division	1	1	Lost in 109th Grey Cup
WPG	2023	14	4	0	.778	1st in West Division	1	1	Lost in 110th Grey Cup
WPG	2024	11	7	0	.611	1st in West Division	1	1	Lost in 111th Grey Cup
WPG	2025	10	8	0	.556	4th in West Division	0	1	Lost in Division Semi-Finals
Total		119	87	0	.578	4 Division Championships	9	7	2 Grey Cups
