= Matthew Peterson (Canadian football) =

Canadian football player (born 2001)

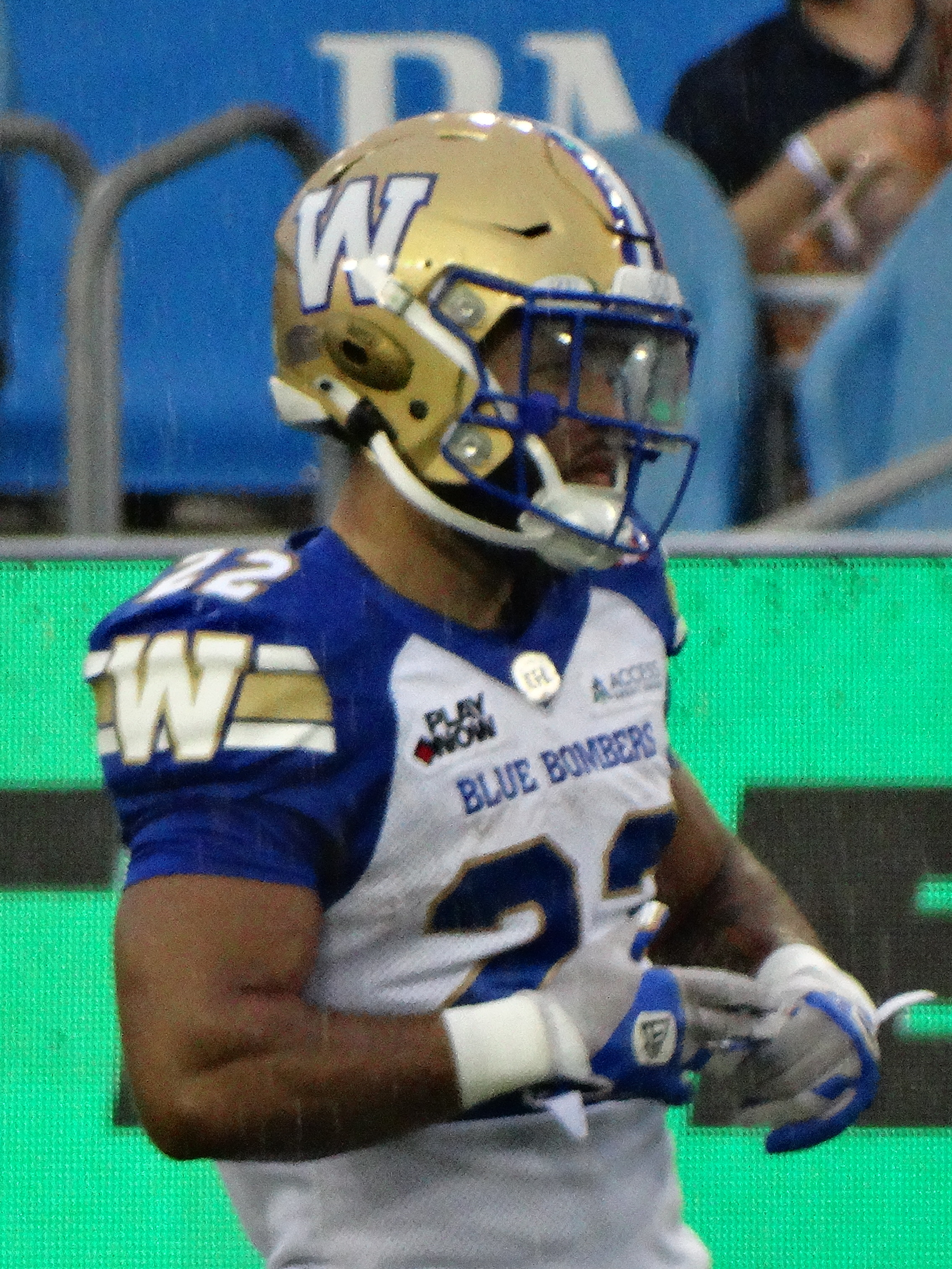
- Peterson with the Winnipeg Blue Bombers in 2025

No. 22 – Winnipeg Blue Bombers
- Position: Running back
- Roster status: Practice roster
- CFL status: National

Personal information
- Born: January 29, 2001 (age 25)
- Listed height: 5 ft 9 in (1.75 m)
- Listed weight: 214 lb (97 kg)

Career information
- High school: Brooks (Brooks, Alberta)
- University: Alberta (2019–2024)
- CFL draft: 2024: 4th round, 36th overall pick

Career history
- Hamilton Tiger-Cats (2024)*; Winnipeg Blue Bombers (2025–present)
- * Offseason or practice squad member only

Awards and highlights
- First-team All-Canadian (2023)
- Stats at CFL.ca

Matthew Peterson (born January 29, 2001) is a Canadian professional football running back for the Winnipeg Blue Bombers of the Canadian Football League (CFL). He played U Sports football at Alberta.

== Early life ==
Matthew Peterson was born on January 29, 2001. He attended Brooks Composite High School in Brooks, Alberta.

== University career ==
Peterson played U Sports football for the Alberta Golden Bears of the University of Alberta. He majored in arts at Alberta. He played in nine games during the 2019 season, rushing 58 times for 210 yards and one touchdown while also catching 17 passes for 124 yards and returning two kicks for 30 yards. The 2020 season was cancelled due to the COVID-19 pandemic. Peterson appeared in eight games in 2021, recording 99 carries for 438 yards and three touchdowns, and 18 receptions for 162 yards and three touchdowns. He played in five games in 2022, rushing 57 times for 283 yards while catching nine passes for 95 yards. He appeared in ten games during the 2023 season, totaling 158 rushes for a career-high 1,317 yards and four touchdowns, and 12 receptions for 157 yards.

Peterson was selected by the Hamilton Tiger-Cats in the fourth round, with the 36th overall pick, of the 2024 CFL draft. He signed with the team on May 3, 2024. He was released before the start of the 2024 CFL season and returned to Alberta for his final season of U Sports eligibility. He played in six games for the Golden Bears during the 2024 U Sports season, rushing 105 times for 784 yards and one touchdown while also catching six passes for 45 yards.

== Professional career ==
Pre-draft measurables
Height	Weight	40-yard dash	20-yard shuttle	Three-cone drill	Vertical jump	Broad jump	Bench press
5 ft 9 in (1.75 m)	203 lb (92 kg)	4.64 s	4.46 s	7.47 s	29.0 in (0.74 m)	9 ft 0 1/8 in (2.75 m)	14 reps
All values from CFL Combine

Peterson re-signed with the Tiger-Cats on December 9, 2024. On April 29, 2025, the morning of the CFL draft, Peterson, the second overall pick in the 2025 CFL global draft, and the 39th overall pick in the 2025 CFL draft were traded to the Winnipeg Blue Bombers for Kyle Samson, the eighth pick in the 2025 global draft, and the 36th pick in the 2025 CFL draft. On June 12, 2025, in Winnipeg's season opener against the BC Lions, Blue Bombers starting running back Brady Oliveira left the game with an injury late in the first quarter. Peterson then made his CFL debut, rushing 23 times for 130 yards and one touchdown as Winnipeg won 34–20. He was named the CFL Running Back of the Week.

On May 31, 2026, Peterson was released as part of final roster cuts but immediately signed to the team's practice roster.
