= Troy Westwood =

Canadian gridiron football player (born 1967)

No. 7
- Positions: Kicker, Punter

Personal information
- Born: March 21, 1967 (age 59); Dauphin, Manitoba, Canada
- Listed height: 5 ft 10 in (1.78 m)
- Listed weight: 190 lb (86 kg)

Career information
- College: Augustana College
- CFL draft: 1991: 6th round, 48th overall pick

Career history
- Winnipeg Blue Bombers (1991–2007, 2009)

Awards and highlights
- 2× Dave Dryburgh Memorial Trophy (2002, 2003); CFL All-Star (1992); 2× CFL East All-Star (1992, 1994)
- Stats at CFL.ca

Troy Westwood (born March 21, 1967) is a Canadian former professional football place kicker and punter who played 18 years for the Winnipeg Blue Bombers of the Canadian Football League (CFL). He was drafted 48th overall in the 6th round of the 1991 CFL draft by the Blue Bombers and holds several club records, including most points scored in a career (2748) and most points scored in a single season (213).

== Early life ==
Westwood was born in Dauphin, Manitoba and raised in Winnipeg. He attended Augustana University in Sioux Falls, South Dakota and graduated in 1991. He played college football for the Augustana College Vikings and was inducted into their Hall of Fame in 2011. Westwood was a gifted youth soccer player, playing for the Manitoba provincial soccer team and invited to a camp for the U18 national team. He was drafted by the Winnipeg Fury of the Canadian Soccer League.

== Professional career ==
Westwood was selected by the Bombers in the 1991 season, when he was selected 48th overall in the 6th round of the Canadian College Draft. Westwood was also known for his mullet, which he reportedly vowed not to cut until he wins the Grey Cup. He decided to grow it out after the 2001 Grey Cup loss to Calgary, in which he missed three out of four field goal attempts. In a radio interview, he publicly denied this claim and attributed his hair to his spirituality, and resents the notion that his hair has anything to do with football. This poor performance capped off what was Westwood's worst season statistically as he only converted on 60.8% of his field goal attempts that year.

After a disappointing start to the 2007 season against Edmonton, Westwood was told by Bomber coach Doug Berry not to dress for the second game of the season against Montreal. After replacement Rob Pikula went 1/2 in field goals, Westwood was reinstated as the Bomber's place kicker by the third game of the season. In the 7th game of the season however, Westwood sustained a hamstring injury and his future with the club was again in doubt. However, after injuries to Pikula and newly signed Pat Fleming, Westwood was called upon for kicking and punting duties in the Eastern Semi-Final where he went 1/2, kicking the game-winning field goal from 20 yards out with no time left on the clock.

Westwood was cut by the Bombers during training camp on June 15, 2008.

Westwood was re-signed by the Blue Bombers on Oct 19, 2009 to their practice roster following an injury to starting punter Mike Renaud and struggles by place kicker Alexis Serna to pull double duty. In April 2010, Westwood was released by the Blue Bombers.

He is known for stirring things up off-field: he has tried his hand at professional boxing and tap dancing, and had a public feud with Montreal Alouette Ed Philion. He is arguably most known for his insult of the rival Saskatchewan Roughriders' fans by calling them "banjo-pickin' inbreds." He later followed that up with a faux apology, saying he did not think anyone in Saskatchewan was actually capable of playing a banjo. These quotes inspired the Banjo Bowl.

== Career stats ==
=== Regular season ===
Year	Kicking							
Year	FG	FG Att	FG %	Singles	Conv	Conv Att	Conv %	Points
1991	16	22	72.7	6	21	21	100	75
1992	47	62	75.8	11	47	48	97.9	199
1993	45	56	80.4	6	68	69	98.5	209
1994	42	58	72.4	15	72	72	100	213
1995	36	49	73.5	5	34	34	100	147
1996	37	51	72.5	9	36	36	100	156
1997	39	54	72.2	7	40	40	100	164
1998	36	64	66.7	6	30	30	100	144
1999	34	49	69.4	11	27	27	100	140
2000	45	58	77.6	8	52	52	100	195
2001	31	51	60.8	12	54	54	100	159
2002	45	62	72.6	12	57	57	100	204
2003	47	61	77.0	9	48	48	100	198
2004	39	50	78.0	8	41	41	100	166
2005	28	40	70.0	8	49	49	100	141
2006	30	43	69.8	15	32	32	100	137
2007	20	33	60.6	6	28	28	100	94
2009	0	0	--	4	0	0	--	4
Career	617	853	72.3	158	736	738	99.7	2,745

== Music ==
Westwood, who was exposed to First Nations culture growing up in Dauphin, has also recorded several albums inspired by First Nations music, both in the band Eagle & Hawk and later as a solo artist named Little Hawk.

== Broadcasting ==
After retiring from football, Westwood was an on-air host for CFQX-FM in Winnipeg from March 2009 to March 2011. He was a morning host on CFRW, Winnipeg's TSN Radio station until the closing of the station by Bell Media in January 2021.

Preceded by Bob Cameron	Winnipeg Blue Bombers Punters; 2003	Succeeded by Jon Ryan
Preceded by Jon Ryan	Winnipeg Blue Bombers Punters; 2006	Succeeded by Pat Fleming
