= Ontaria Wilson =

American gridiron football player (born 1999)

- Wilson with the Winnipeg Blue Bombers in 2026

No. 80 – Winnipeg Blue Bombers
- Position: Wide receiver
- Roster status: Active
- CFL status: American

Personal information
- Born: August 12, 1999 (age 27); Ashburn, Georgia, U.S.
- Listed height: 6 ft 0 in (1.83 m)
- Listed weight: 171 lb (78 kg)

Career information
- High school: Turner County
- College: Florida State (2018–2022)
- NFL draft: 2023: undrafted

Career history
- Los Angeles Chargers (2023)*; Winnipeg Blue Bombers (2024); New York Jets (2025)*; Winnipeg Blue Bombers (2025–present)
- * Offseason or practice squad member only

Career CFL statistics as of 2025
- Games played: 24
- Receptions: 92
- Receiving yards: 1,408
- Receiving touchdowns: 6
- Stats at CFL.ca
- Stats at Pro Football Reference

Ontaria "Pokey" Wilson (born August 12, 1999) is an American professional football wide receiver for the Winnipeg Blue Bombers of the Canadian Football League (CFL).

== College career ==
After using a redshirt season in 2017, Wilson played college football for the Florida State Seminoles from 2018 to 2022. He played in 51 games, starting in 36, where he had 108 receptions for 1,521 yards and 12 touchdowns.

== Professional career ==
Pre-draft measurables
Height	Weight	Arm length	Hand span	Wingspan	40-yard dash	10-yard split	20-yard split	20-yard shuttle	Three-cone drill	Vertical jump	Broad jump	Bench press
6 ft 0 1/8 in (1.83 m)	181 lb (82 kg)	32 in (0.81 m)	9 5/8 in (0.24 m)	6 ft 5 7/8 in (1.98 m)	4.60 s	1.62 s	2.77 s	4.40 s	7.16 s	32.0 in (0.81 m)	10 ft 1 in (3.07 m)	8 reps
All values from Pro Day

=== Los Angeles Chargers ===
After going unselected in the 2023 NFL draft, Wilson was signed by the Los Angeles Chargers as an undrafted free agent. At the end of training camp, he was released on August 29, 2023.

=== Winnipeg Blue Bombers (first stint) ===
On October 30, 2023, Wilson signed a futures contract with the Winnipeg Blue Bombers. Following training camp in 2024, he made the team's active roster as an opening day starter. He made his professional debut on June 6, 2024, against the Montreal Alouettes, where he had one reception for 16 yards. Wilson had a breakout game on July 12, against the Calgary Stampeders, where he had 13 receptions for 201 yards and his first professional touchdown. The 13 catches tied for second all-time in Blue Bombers history.

=== New York Jets ===
On January 16, 2025, Wilson signed a reserve/future contract with the New York Jets. He was waived by the Jets on August 23.

=== Winnipeg Blue Bombers (second stint) ===
Wilson re-signed with the Blue Bombers on September 1, 2025.

== Personal life ==
Wilson's nickname is "Pokey", as his grandmother stated that he looked like a Pokémon as a baby.
