= 2024 Winnipeg Blue Bombers season =

CFL team season

- General manager: Kyle Walters
- President: Wade Miller
- Head coach: Mike O'Shea
- Home stadium: Princess Auto Stadium

Results
- Record: 11–7
- Division place: 1st, West
- Playoffs: Lost Grey Cup
- Team MOP: Brady Oliveira
- Team MODP: Tyrell Ford
- Team MOC: Brady Oliveira
- Team MOOL: Stanley Bryant
- Team MOST: Sergio Castillo
- Team MOR: Ontaria Wilson

Uniform
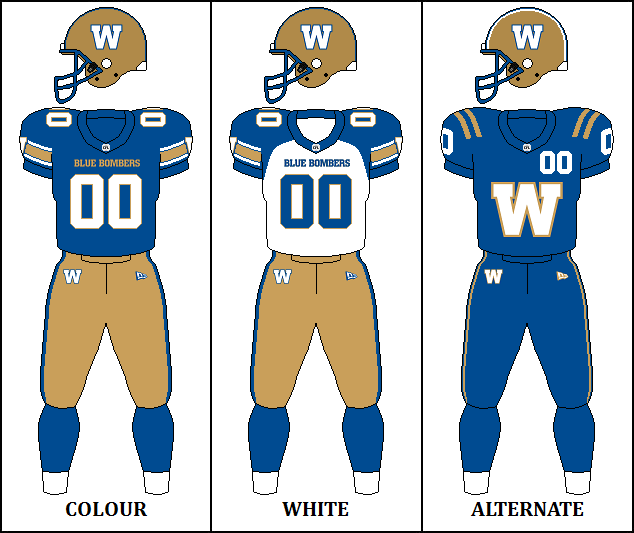

The 2024 Winnipeg Blue Bombers season was the 66th season for the team in the Canadian Football League (CFL) and their 91st season overall. The Blue Bombers qualified for the playoffs for the eighth consecutive season following their week 17 win over the Edmonton Elks. The team also finished in first place in West Division for the fourth season in a row. The Blue Bombers defeated the Saskatchewan Roughriders in the West Final and appeared in their fifth consecutive Grey Cup game. However, the team lost 41–24 in the 111th Grey Cup to the Toronto Argonauts, resulting in their third consecutive loss.

The 2024 CFL season was the tenth season under head coach Mike O'Shea and the tenth full season under general manager Kyle Walters.

The Winnipeg Blue Bombers drew an average home attendance of 31,165 in 2024.

== Offseason ==
=== CFL global draft ===
The 2024 CFL global draft took place on April 30, 2024. The Blue Bombers had two picks in the draft, selecting eighth in each round.

Round	Pick	Player	Position	Club/School	Nationality
1	8	Fabian Weitz	LB	Cologne Centurions	Germany
2	17	Lucky Ogbevoen	DB	Raiders Tirol	Austria

== CFL national draft ==
The 2024 CFL draft took place on April 30, 2024. The Blue Bombers had ten selections in the eight-round draft. Not including traded picks, the team selected eighth in each round of the draft by virtue of losing the 110th Grey Cup game.

Round	Pick	Player	Position	University team	Hometown
2	13	Kevens Clercius	WR	Connecticut	Montreal, QC
2	14	Michael Chris-Ike	RB	Delaware State	Hamilton, ON
2	17	Gabe Wallace	OL	Buffalo	Salmon Arm, BC
2	20	Kyle Samson	DL	British Columbia	Hamilton, ON
4	37	Ian Leroux	LS	Laval	Quebec City, QC
5	40	Ethan Kalra	OL	Waterloo	Acton, ON
5	46	Giovanni Manu	OL	British Columbia	Pitt Meadows, BC
6	55	Abdul-Karim Gassama	WR	Manitoba	Winnipeg, MB
7	64	Michael Vlahogiannis	OL	McGill	Mount Royal, QC
8	73	Owen Hubert	DL	McMaster	Kitchener, ON

== Preseason ==
=== Schedule ===
Week	Game	Date	Kickoff	Opponent	Results		TV	Venue	Attendance	Summary
Week	Game	Date	Kickoff	Opponent	Score	Record	TV	Venue	Attendance	Summary
A	1	Mon, May 20	3:00 p.m. CDT	at Saskatchewan Roughriders	L 12–25	0–1	CFL+	Mosaic Stadium	N/A	Recap
B	Bye									
C	2	Fri, May 31	7:30 p.m. CDT	vs. Calgary Stampeders	L 10–31	0–2	CFL+	Princess Auto Stadium	N/A	Recap

== Regular season ==
=== Standings ===
West Division
Team	GP	W	L	T	Pts	PF	PA	Div	Stk	
Winnipeg Blue Bombers	18	11	7	0	22	447	365	7–3	W1	Details
Saskatchewan Roughriders	18	9	8	1	19	478	434	5–5	L1	Details
BC Lions	18	9	9	0	18	448	439	5–5	W1	Details
Edmonton Elks	18	7	11	0	14	494	500	5–5	W2	Details
Calgary Stampeders	18	5	12	1	11	427	510	3–7	W1	Details

=== Schedule ===
Week	Game	Date	Kickoff	Opponent	Results		TV	Venue	Attendance	Summary
Week	Game	Date	Kickoff	Opponent	Score	Record	TV	Venue	Attendance	Summary
1	1	Thu, June 6	7:30 p.m. CDT	vs. Montreal Alouettes	L 12–27	0–1	TSN/RDS/CBSSN	Princess Auto Stadium	30,140	Recap
2	2	Thu, June 13	6:30 p.m. CDT	at Ottawa Redblacks	L 19–23	0–2	TSN/RDS	TD Place Stadium	16,310	Recap
3	3	Fri, June 21	7:30 p.m. CDT	vs. BC Lions	L 24–26	0–3	TSN/RDS	Princess Auto Stadium	31,210	Recap
4	4	Sat, June 29	6:00 p.m. CDT	at Calgary Stampeders	L 19–22 (OT)	0–4	TSN/CBSSN	McMahon Stadium	22,386	Recap
5	5	Fri, July 5	7:30 p.m. CDT	vs. Ottawa Redblacks	W 25–16	1–4	TSN/RDS	Princess Auto Stadium	28,719	Recap
6	6	Fri, July 12	7:30 p.m. CDT	vs. Calgary Stampeders	W 41–37	2–4	TSN/RDS	Princess Auto Stadium	29,467	Recap
7	7	Fri, July 19	8:30 p.m. CDT	at Saskatchewan Roughriders	L 9–19	2–5	TSN	Mosaic Stadium	29,649	Recap
8	8	Sat, July 27	6:00 p.m. CDT	at Toronto Argonauts	L 14–16 (OT)	2–6	TSN/CBSSN	BMO Field	14,994	Recap
9	9	Thu, Aug 1	7:30 p.m. CDT	vs. BC Lions	W 25–0	3–6	TSN/RDS	Princess Auto Stadium	31,859	Recap
10	Bye									
11	10	Sun, Aug 18	6:00 p.m. CDT	at BC Lions	W 20–11	4–6	TSN/RDS2/CBSSN	BC Place	30,803	Recap
12	11	Fri, Aug 23	7:30 p.m. CDT	vs. Hamilton Tiger-Cats	W 26–23	5–6	TSN/RDS/CBSSN	Princess Auto Stadium	32,343	Recap
13	12	Sun, Sept 1	6:00 p.m. CDT	at Saskatchewan Roughriders	W 35–33	6–6	TSN/CBSSN	Mosaic Stadium	33,861	Recap
14	13	Sat, Sept 7	2:00 p.m. CDT	vs. Saskatchewan Roughriders	W 26–21	7–6	CTV	Princess Auto Stadium	32,343	Recap
15	Bye									
16	14	Sat, Sept 21	6:00 p.m. CDT	at Edmonton Elks	W 27–14	8–6	TSN	Commonwealth Stadium	22,605	Recap
17	15	Fri, Sept 27	7:00 p.m. CDT	vs. Edmonton Elks	W 55–27	9–6	TSN/CBSSN	Princess Auto Stadium	32,343	Recap
18	16	Fri, Oct 4	6:00 p.m. CDT	at Hamilton Tiger-Cats	W 31–10	10–6	TSN/RDS	Tim Hortons Field	22,241	Recap
19	17	Fri, Oct 11	7:30 p.m. CDT	vs. Toronto Argonauts	L 11–14	10–7	TSN/RDS2	Princess Auto Stadium	32,343	Recap
20	Bye									
21	18	Sat, Oct 26	2:00 p.m. CDT	at Montreal Alouettes	W 28–27	11–7	CTV/RDS	Molson Stadium	23,035	Recap

== Post-season ==
=== Schedule ===
Game	Date	Kickoff	Opponent	Results		TV	Venue	Attendance	Summary
Game	Date	Kickoff	Opponent	Score	Record	TV	Venue	Attendance	Summary
West Semi-Final	Sat, Nov 2	Bye							
West Final	Sat, Nov 9	5:30 p.m. CST	vs. Saskatchewan Roughriders	W 38–22	1–0	TSN/RDS	Princess Auto Stadium	32,343	Recap
111th Grey Cup	Sun, Nov 17	5:00 p.m. CST	Toronto Argonauts	L 24–41	1–1	CTV/TSN/RDS	BC Place	52,439	Recap

== Roster ==
2024 Winnipeg Blue Bombers final roster
**Quarterbacks**: 8 Zach Collaros; 15 Jake Dolegala; 3 Terry Wilson; **Running backs**: 27 Johnny Augustine; 36 Bailey Feltmate; 20 Brady Oliveira; **Receivers**: 86 Kevens Clercius; 10 Nic Demski; 89 Kenny Lawler; 88 Keric Wheatfall; 13 Lucky Whitehead; 80 Ontaria Wilson	**Offensive linemen**: 66 Stanley Bryant T; 61 Liam Dobson G; 65 Asotui Eli G/C; 67 Chris Kolankowski C; 55 Eric Lofton T; 53 Patrick Neufeld G; 61 Gabe Wallace G; **Defensive linemen**: 90 Miles Fox DT; 9 TyJuan Garbutt DE; 45 Celestin Haba DE; 5 Willie Jefferson DE; 93 Kyle Samson DT; 96 Tanner Schmekel DT; 95 Jake Thomas DT	**Linebackers**: 49 Michael Ayers; 47 Tanner Cadwallader; 39 Max Charbonneau; 44 Shayne Gauthier; 33 Tony Jones; 50 Fabian Weitz; 19 Kyrie Wilson; **Defensive backs**: 37 Brandon Alexander; 24 Terrell Bonds; 30 Tyrell Ford; 32 Michael Griffin; 21 Nick Hallett; 31 Evan Holm; 6 Redha Kramdi; 1 Deatrick Nichols; 12 Nick Taylor	**Special teams**: 40 Mike Benson LS; 14 Sergio Castillo K; 18 Jamieson Sheahan P; **Practice roster**: 93 Owen Hubert DE; 42 Souleymane Karamoko DB; 87 Jeremy Murphy WR; 43 Lucky Ogbevoen LB; 26 Chris Smith RB; **Suspended list**: Montrae Braswell DB; Braxton Burmeister WR; James Campbell DB; Kenny Randall DT	**Injured list**: 94 Devin Adams DT; 4 Adam Bighill LB; 29 Marquise Bridges DB; 2 Kody Case WR; 25 Michael Chris-Ike FB; 41 Brian Cole II LB; 23 Noah Hallett DB; 16 Jake Kelly DB; 99 Cameron Lawson DT; 0 Myron Mitchell SB; 7 Jamal Parker DB; 37 Jay Person DE; 69 Kendall Randolph G/T; 83 Dalton Schoen SB; 17 Chris Streveler QB; 68 Micah Vanterpool G; 82 Drew Wolitarsky WR; 91 Jamal Woods DT
Italics indicate American player • **Bold** indicates Global player

== Coaching staff ==
Winnipeg Blue Bombers staff
Front office: Owner – Winnipeg Football Club; Chairperson of the Board of Governors – Dayna Spiring; President/CEO – Wade Miller; General Manager of Football Operations – Kyle Walters; Senior Assistant General Manager / Director of Player Personnel – Ted Goveia; Assistant General Manager / Director of U.S. Scouting – Danny McManus; Assistant Director of Player Personnel — Cyril Penn; Director of Football Operations – Matt Gulakow; Equipment Staff: Head Equipment Manager – Brad Fotty; Assistant Equipment Manager – Kevin Todd	Head Coaches: Head Coach – Mike O'Shea; Offensive coaches: Offensive Coordinator and Quarterbacks – Buck Pierce; Receivers – Kevin Bourgoin; Running Backs – Jason Hogan; Offensive Line – Marty Costello; Defensive coaches: Defensive Coordinator – Jordan Younger; Defensive Line – Darrell Patterson; Pass Game Analyst and Linebackers – James Stanley; Defensive Assistant – Richie Hall; Special teams coaches: Special Teams Coordinator – Mike Miller; Video Coaches: Video Coordinator – Evan Best; → Coaching staff
