= Kyle Samson (Canadian football) =

Canadian gridiron football player (born 2000)

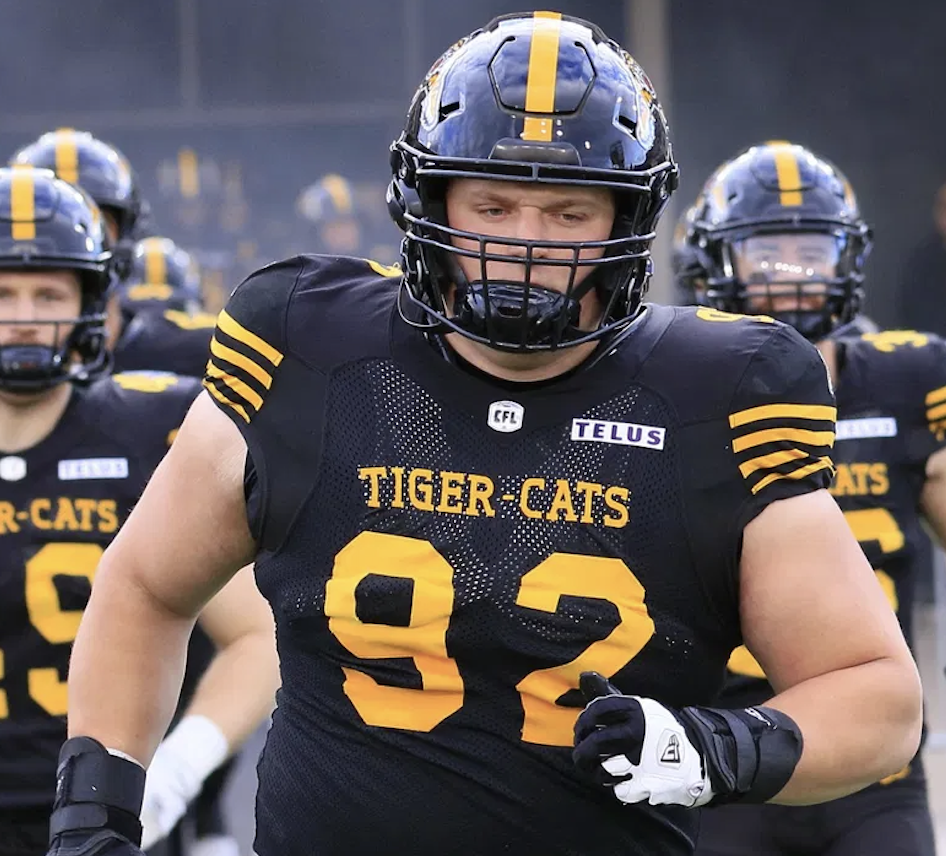

Profile
- Position: Defensive lineman

Personal information
- Born: November 14, 2000 (age 25); Hamilton, Ontario, Canada
- Listed height: 6 ft 3 in (1.91 m)
- Listed weight: 290 lb (132 kg)

Career information
- University: British Columbia
- CFL draft: 2024: 2nd round, 20th overall pick

Career history
- 2024: Winnipeg Blue Bombers
- 2025: Hamilton Tiger-Cats*
- 2025: Calgary Stampeders
- * Offseason or practice squad member only

Awards and highlights
- 2× Second-team All-Canadian (2022, 2023)
- Stats at CFL.ca

Kyle Samson (born November 14, 2000) is a Canadian professional football defensive lineman. He most recently played for the Calgary Stampeders of the Canadian Football League (CFL).

== University career ==
Samson played U Sports football for the UBC Thunderbirds from 2019 to 2023. He played in 33 games over four seasons with the team where he had 76 total tackles, 19.5 tackles for a loss, eight sacks, and one interception. He was named a Second-team All-Canadian in 2022 and 2023.

== Professional career ==
=== Winnipeg Blue Bombers ===
Samson was drafted in the second round, 20th overall by the Winnipeg Blue Bombers in the 2024 CFL draft and signed with the team on May 5, 2024. Following training camp in 2024, he was assigned to the practice roster where he remained for the entirety of the regular season and playoffs. He then made his professional and post-season debut on November 17, 2024, in the 111th Grey Cup, where the Blue Bombers lost to the Toronto Argonauts.

=== Hamilton Tiger-Cats ===
On April 29, 2025, Samson was traded to the Hamilton Tiger-Cats in exchange for running back Matthew Peterson and an exchange of draft picks. He began the season on the practice roster and was released on July 30, 2025.

=== Calgary Stampeders ===
On August 3, 2025, it was announced that Samson had signed with the Calgary Stampeders. He dressed in one regular season game and finished the year on the practice roster. His contract expired on November 2, 2025.
