= 2018 Winnipeg Blue Bombers season =

Canadian football team season

- General manager: Kyle Walters
- Head coach: Mike O'Shea
- Home stadium: Investors Group Field

Results
- Record: 10–8
- Division place: 3rd, West
- Playoffs: Lost West Final
- Team MOP: Adam Bighill
- Team MOC: Andrew Harris
- Team MOR: Marcus Sayles

Uniform
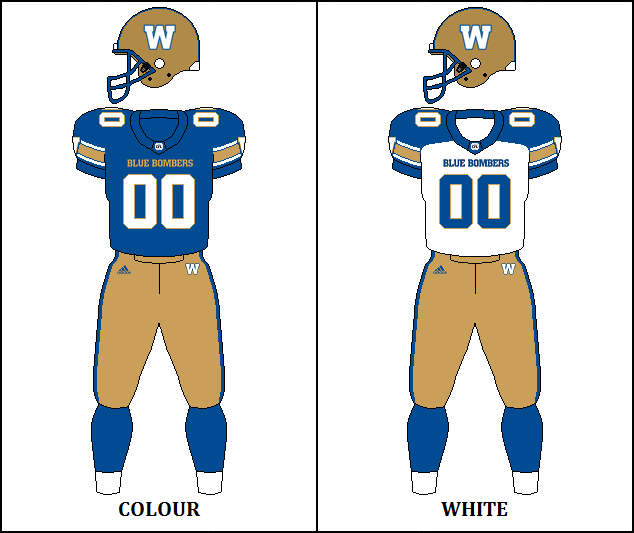

The 2018 Winnipeg Blue Bombers season was the 61st season for the team in the Canadian Football League (CFL) and their 86th season overall. This was the fifth season under head coach Mike O'Shea and the fifth full season under general manager Kyle Walters. Following a week 20 win over the Calgary Stampeders, the Blue Bombers qualified for the playoffs for the third consecutive season, rebounding from a 5–7 record to start the season. The Blue Bombers defeated the Saskatchewan Roughriders in the West Division Semi-Final to start the postseason and appeared in their first Division Final since 2011, playing against the Stampeders in the 2018 edition. The team lost against the Stampeders 22–14, extending the franchise's Grey Cup drought for a 28th year.

== Offseason ==
=== CFL draft ===
The 2018 CFL draft took place on May 3, 2018. The Blue Bombers had seven selections in the eight-round draft after trading their first and second round selections to the BC Lions for their second round pick in the 2018 draft and their first round pick in the 2019 CFL draft. The Bombers also lost a third-round pick after taking Drew Wolitarsky in the 2017 Supplemental Draft but gained Toronto's after dealing Drew Willy to the Argonauts in 2016.

Round	Pick	Player	Position	School/Club team
2	12	Rashaun Simonise	WR	Calgary
3	26	Daniel Petermann	WR	McMaster
4	33	Arnaud Gendron-Dumouchel	OL	Montreal
5	41	Tyrone Pierre	WR	Laval
6	49	Matthew Ouellet De Carlo	OL	Bishop's
7	58	Jacob Firlotte	DB	Queen's
8	67	Ben Koczwara	OL	Waterloo

== Preseason ==
Week	Date	Kickoff	Opponent	Results		TV	Venue	Attendance	Summary
Week	Date	Kickoff	Opponent	Score	Record	TV	Venue	Attendance	Summary
A	Bye								
B	Fri, June 1	7:30 p.m. CDT	vs. Edmonton Eskimos	W 33–13	1–0	None	Investors Group Field	23,034	Recap
C	Fri, June 8	9:30 p.m. CDT	at BC Lions	L 21–34	1–1	TSN	BC Place	15,237	Recap

== Regular season ==
=== Standings ===
West Division
Team	GP	W	L	T	Pts	PF	PA	Div	Stk	
Calgary Stampeders	18	13	5	0	26	522	363	5–5	W1	Details
Saskatchewan Roughriders	18	12	6	0	24	450	444	7–3	W2	Details
Winnipeg Blue Bombers	18	10	8	0	20	550	419	4–6	L1	Details
BC Lions	18	9	9	0	18	423	473	4–6	L2	Details
Edmonton Eskimos	18	9	9	0	18	482	471	5–5	W1	Details

=== Schedule ===
Week	Game	Date	Kickoff	Opponent	Results		TV	Venue	Attendance	Summary
Week	Game	Date	Kickoff	Opponent	Score	Record	TV	Venue	Attendance	Summary
1	1	Thurs, June 14	7:30 p.m. CDT	Edmonton Eskimos	L 30–33	0–1	TSN/RDS2/ESPN2	Investors Group Field	25,458	Recap
2	2	Fri, June 22	6:00 p.m. CDT	@ Montreal Alouettes	W 56–10	1–1	TSN/RDS/ESPN2	Molson Stadium	19,498	Recap
3	3	Fri, June 29	6:00 p.m. CDT	@ Hamilton Tiger-Cats	L 17–31	1–2	TSN/RDS/ESPN2	Tim Hortons Field	23,721	Recap
4	4	Sat, July 7	7:30 p.m. CDT	BC Lions	W 41–19	2–2	TSN	Investors Group Field	26,567	Recap
5	5	Sat, July 14	9:00 p.m. CDT	@ BC Lions	L 17–20	2–3	TSN	BC Place	19,541	Recap
6	6	Sat, July 21	3:00 p.m. CDT	@ Toronto Argonauts	W 38–20	3–3	TSN	BMO Field	10,844	Recap
7	7	Fri, July 27	7:30 p.m. CDT	Toronto Argonauts	W 40–14	4–3	TSN/RDS/ESPN2	Investors Group Field	27,116	Recap
8	Bye									
9	8	Fri, Aug 10	7:30 p.m. CDT	Hamilton Tiger-Cats	W 29–23	5–3	TSN/RDS	Investors Group Field	26,454	Recap
10	9	Fri, Aug 17	7:30 p.m. CDT	Ottawa Redblacks	L 21–44	5–4	TSN/RDS	Investors Group Field	27,602	Recap
11	10	Sat, Aug 25	2:30 p.m. CDT	@ Calgary Stampeders	L 26–39	5–5	TSN	McMahon Stadium	27,800	Recap
12	11	Sun, Sept 2	2:00 p.m. CDT	@ Saskatchewan Roughriders	L 23–31	5–6	TSN	Mosaic Stadium	33,350	Recap
13	12	Sat, Sept 8	3:00 p.m. CDT	Saskatchewan Roughriders	L 27–32	5–7	TSN	Investors Group Field	33,134	Recap
14	Bye									
15	13	Fri, Sept 21	7:30 p.m. CDT	Montreal Alouettes	W 31–14	6–7	TSN/RDS	Investors Group Field	24,349	Recap
16	14	Sat, Sept 29	6:00 p.m. CDT	@ Edmonton Eskimos	W 30–3	7–7	TSN/RDS2	Commonwealth Stadium	28,788	Recap
17	15	Fri, Oct 5	6:30 p.m. CDT	@ Ottawa Redblacks	W 40–32 (OT)	8–7	TSN	TD Place Stadium	21,027	Recap
18	16	Sat, Oct 13	1:00 p.m. CDT	Saskatchewan Roughriders	W 31–0	9–7	TSN	Investors Group Field	26,070	Recap
19	Bye									
20	17	Fri, Oct 26	7:30 p.m. CDT	Calgary Stampeders	W 29–21	10–7	TSN	Investors Group Field	25,173	Recap
21	18	Sat, Nov 3	3:00 p.m. CDT	@ Edmonton Eskimos	L 24–33	10–8	TSN	Commonwealth Stadium	27,749	Recap

== Post-season ==
=== Schedule ===
The Winnipeg Blue Bombers win against Saskatchewan in the 2018 West Division Semi Final was the first playoff win for the Blue Bombers franchise since their 19-3 victory against the Hamilton Tiger-Cats in the 2011 East Division Final. Their West Final game against the Calgary Stampeders team marked the first time since the 2001 Grey Cup Game that both the Blue Bombers and Stampeders met in playoff contention (the Winnipeg Blue Bombers were then representing the CFL's East Division when there were only eight teams in the Canadian Football League).

Game	Date	Kickoff	Opponent	Results		TV	Venue	Attendance	Summary
Game	Date	Kickoff	Opponent	Score	Record	TV	Venue	Attendance	Summary
West Semi-Final	Sun, Nov 11	3:30 p.m. CST	@ Saskatchewan Roughriders	W 23–18	1–0	TSN/RDS/ESPN2	Mosaic Stadium	30,609	Recap
West Final	Sun, Nov 18	3:30 p.m. CST	@ Calgary Stampeders	L 14–22	1–1	TSN/RDS/ESPNews	McMahon Stadium	29,268	Recap

== Roster ==
2018 Winnipeg Blue Bombers final roster
Quarterbacks: 18 Bryan Bennett; 15 Matt Nichols; 17 Chris Streveler; Running backs: 33 Andrew Harris; 27 Kienan LaFrance; 24 Mike Miller; 32 John Rush; Receivers: 1 Darvin Adams; 10 Nic Demski; 7 Weston Dressler; 84 Ryan Lankford; 12 Charles Nelson; 81 Daniel Petermann; 13 Rashaun Simonise; 82 Drew Wolitarsky	Offensive linemen: 66 Stanley Bryant T; 69 Sukh Chungh G; 59 Michael Couture G/T; 61 Matthias Goossen C; 51 Jermarcus Hardrick T; 53 Patrick Neufeld G; Defensive linemen: 96 Brandin Bryant DE; 94 Jackson Jeffcoat DE; 92 Drake Nevis DT; 54 Tristan Okpalaugo DE; 93 Craig Roh DE; 95 Jake Thomas DT; Special teams: 9 Justin Medlock K/P; 46 Chad Rempel LS	Linebackers: 4 Adam Bighill; 34 Jesse Briggs; 44 Shayne Gauthier; 52 Thomas Miles; 39 Frédéric Plesius; 38 Ian Wild; 19 Kyrie Wilson; Defensive backs: 37 Brandon Alexander; 41 Abu Conteh; 22 Chandler Fenner; 3 Kevin Fogg; 23 Anthony Gaitor; 29 Jeff Hecht; 16 Taylor Loffler; 21 Brendan Morgan; 8 Chris Randle; 36 Marcus Sayles	Practice Roster: 25 Johnny Augustine RB; 90 Patrick Choudja DE; 26 Tyneil Cooper DB; 42 Jacob Firlotte LB; 20 Tim Flanders RB; 89 Kenny Lawler WR; 56 Gerald Rivers DE; 64 Qadr Spooner G; Injured list: 43 Trent Corney DE; 57 Manase Foketi T; 68 Geoff Gray G; 35 Chris Humes DB; 0 Derek Jones DB; 31 Maurice Leggett DB; 40 Frank Renaud LB; 45 Jovan Santos-Knox LB; 62 Cody Speller C; 2 Kenbrell Thompkins SB; 6 Corey Washington SB; Italics indicate International players

== Coaching staff ==
Winnipeg Blue Bombers Staff
Front office: Owner – Community owned (non-profit corporation owned by members); Chairperson of the board of governors – Brock Bulbuck; President/CEO – Wade Miller; General manager of football operations – Kyle Walters; Assistant General Manager / Director of U.S. Scouting – Danny McManus; Assistant general manager / director of player personnel – Ted Goveia; National scout – Craig Smith; Team services coordinator – Matt Gulakow; Head equipment manager – Brad Fotty; Assistant equipment manager – Kevin Todd; Assistant equipment manager – Jared Cronk; Video coordinator – Kent Anderson; Assistant video coordinator – Colin Thurston	Head coaches: Head coach – Mike O'Shea; Offensive coaches: Offensive coordinator/receivers – Paul LaPolice; Quarterbacks – Buck Pierce; Running backs – Kevin Bourgoin; Offensive line – Marty Costello; Defensive coaches: Defensive coordinator – Richie Hall; Defensive Line & Linebackers – Glen Young; Defensive backs – Jordan Younger; Special teams coaches: Special teams coordinator – Paul Boudreau; → Coaching staff
