= Michael Palardy =

American football player (born 1992)

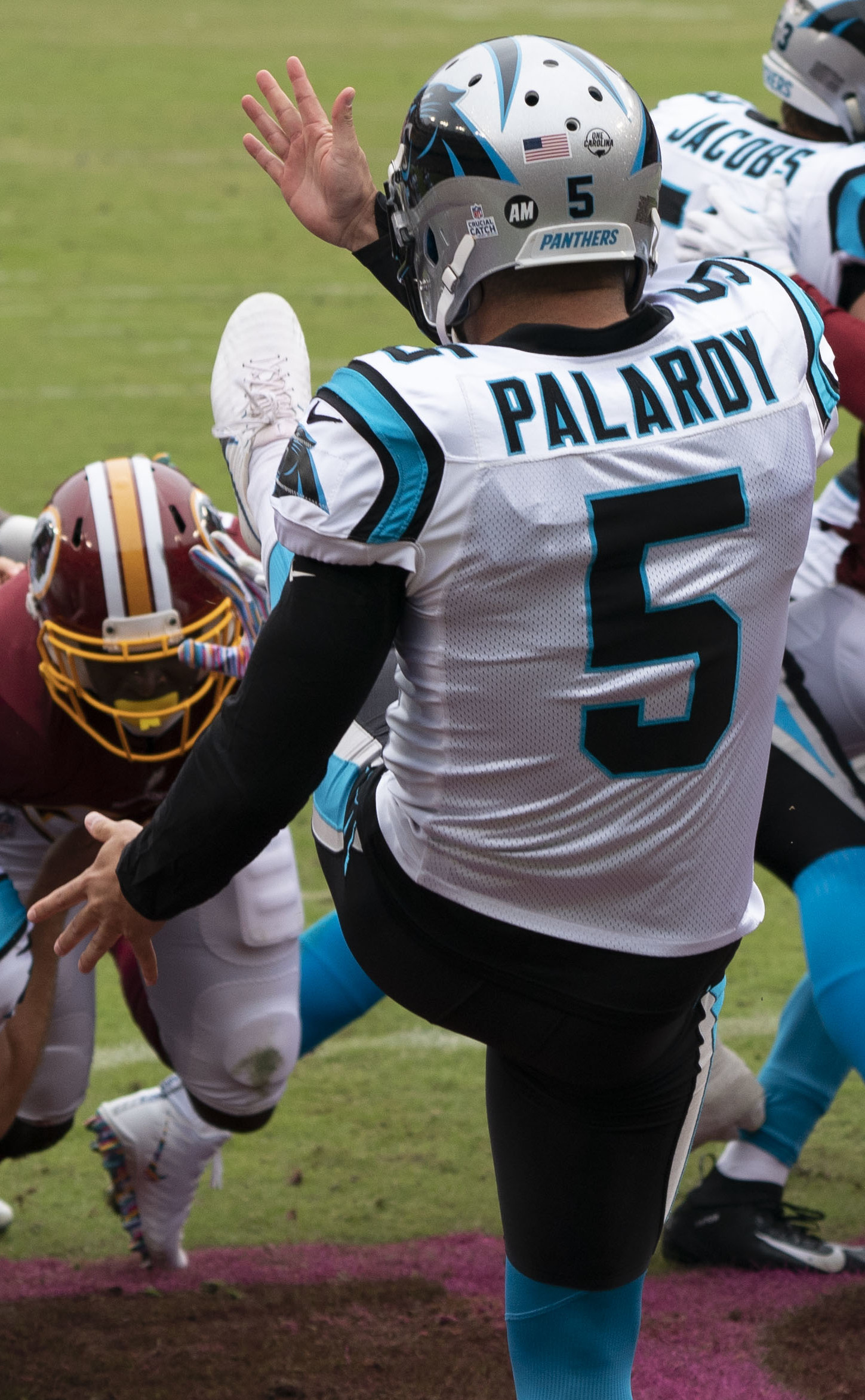
- Palardy with the Carolina Panthers in 2018

Profile
- Position: Punter

Personal information
- Born: July 6, 1992 (age 34); Margate, Florida, U.S.
- Listed height: 5 ft 11 in (1.80 m)
- Listed weight: 200 lb (91 kg)

Career information
- High school: St. Thomas Aquinas (Fort Lauderdale, Florida)
- College: Tennessee (2010–2013)
- NFL draft: 2014: undrafted

Career history
- Oakland Raiders (2014)*; St. Louis Rams (2015)*; Toronto Argonauts (2015); Carolina Panthers (2016)*; Baltimore Ravens (2016)*; Indianapolis Colts (2016)*; Cleveland Browns (2016)*; Atlanta Falcons (2016)*; Carolina Panthers (2016–2020); Miami Dolphins (2021); New England Patriots (2022); Washington Commanders (2023)*; Arizona Cardinals (2024)
- * Offseason or practice squad member only

Awards and highlights
- Second-team All-SEC (2013)

Career NFL statistics as of 2023
- Punts: 363
- Punting yards: 16,281
- Average punt: 44.9
- Longest punt: 65
- Inside 20: 128
- Stats at Pro Football Reference

Michael Albert Palardy (born July 6, 1992) is an American professional football punter. He played college football for the Tennessee Volunteers and was signed by the Oakland Raiders as an undrafted free agent in 2014. He has also been a member of the St. Louis Rams, Toronto Argonauts, Carolina Panthers, Baltimore Ravens, Indianapolis Colts, Cleveland Browns, Atlanta Falcons, Miami Dolphins, New England Patriots, and Washington Commanders.

== Early life ==
Paladry attended and played high school football at St. Thomas Aquinas High School. He was rated as a three-star prospect on Rivals.com.

== College career ==
Palardy attended the University of Tennessee, where he played on the Tennessee Volunteers football team from 2010 to 2013 under head coaches Derek Dooley and Butch Jones. During his time with the Volunteers, Palardy had roles as the placekicker and punter.

As a freshman in 2010, Palardy converted 13 of 14 extra point attempts and 5 of 7 field goal attempts. In addition, he had four punts for 157 yards for a 39.3 average. As a sophomore in 2011, he converted 25 of 26 extra point attempts and 9 of 14 field goal attempts. In addition, he had 14 punts for 515 net yards for a 36.8 average. As a junior in 2012, he converted 37 of 40 extra point attempts and 9 of 12 field goal attempts. In addition, he had 36 punts for 1,551 net yards for a 43.1 average. On October 19, 2013, against the No. 11 South Carolina Gamecocks, Palardy hit a game-winning 19-yard field goal as time expired to give the Volunteers their first win over a ranked opponent in several years. As a senior in 2013, he converted 34 of 35 extra point attempts and 14 of 17 field goal attempts.

=== Collegiate statistics ===
Michael Palardy			Kicking							Punting		
Year	School	G	XPM	XPA	XP%	FGM	FGA	FG%	Pts	Punts	Yds	Avg
2010	Tennessee	11	13	14	92.9	5	7	71.4	28	4	157	39.3
2011	Tennessee	11	25	26	96.2	9	14	64.3	52	14	515	36.8
2012	Tennessee	12	37	40	92.5	9	12	75.0	64	36	1,551	43.1
2013	Tennessee	12	34	35	97.1	14	17	82.4	76	15	689	45.9
Career	Tennessee	46	109	115	94.8	37	50	74.0	220	69	2,912	42.2

== Professional career ==
Pre-draft measurables
Height	Weight	Arm length	Hand span	40-yard dash	10-yard split	20-yard split
5 ft 11 1/4 in (1.81 m)	191 lb (87 kg)	29 1/2 in (0.75 m)	9 in (0.23 m)	4.68 s	1.65 s	2.75 s
All values are from Tennessee's Pro Day

=== Oakland Raiders ===
After going undrafted in the 2014 NFL draft, Palardy signed with the Oakland Raiders on June 5, 2014. On August 7, 2014, he was waived. Palardy was signed to the Raiders' practice squad on December 24, 2014.

=== St. Louis Rams ===
On January 6, 2015, Palardy was signed by the St. Louis Rams. He was waived on September 1, 2015.

=== Toronto Argonauts ===
Palardy was signed by the Toronto Argonauts of the Canadian Football League on September 19, 2015. He played in one game for the Argonauts in 2015, punting six times and scoring one rouge. On March 30, 2016, he was released. While with the Argonauts, he was teammates with fellow kicker Justin Palardy, who was also signed by the team in September. They are not related.

=== Carolina Panthers (first stint) ===
On April 4, 2016, Palardy was signed by the Carolina Panthers. He was waived on June 7, 2016.

=== Baltimore Ravens ===
Palardy was signed by the Baltimore Ravens on July 30, 2016. On August 3, 2016, he was released.

=== Indianapolis Colts ===
On August 6, 2016, Palardy was signed by the Indianapolis Colts. He was waived on August 15, 2016.

=== Cleveland Browns ===
Palardy was signed by the Cleveland Browns on August 30, 2016. On September 3, 2016, he was waived. Palardy was signed to the Browns' practice squad on September 5, 2016. On September 22, 2016, he was released.

=== Atlanta Falcons ===
On October 4, 2016, Palardy was signed to the Atlanta Falcons' practice squad. He was waived on October 11, 2016.

=== Carolina Panthers (second stint) ===
Palardy was signed by the Panthers on November 14, 2016, after Andy Lee was placed on injured reserve. He made his NFL debut against the New Orleans Saints in Week 11. He recorded six punts for 280 net yards for a 46.67 average. Overall, in the 2016 season, he finished with 36 punts for 1,531 net yards for a 42.53 average.

In 2017, Palardy won the Panthers' punting job after the Panthers released Lee during final roster cuts. Overall, in the 2017 season, he finished with 71 punts for 3,268 net yards for a 46.03 average.

On April 16, 2018, Palardy signed his exclusive rights tender, staying with the Panthers for the 2018 season. On October 2, 2018, Palardy signed a three-year contract extension with the Panthers through the 2021 season.

In the 2018 season, Palardy had 61 punts for a 45.23 average. In the 2019 season, Palardy had 75 punts with a 46.03 average.

On July 28, 2020, Palardy was placed on the reserve/non-football injury list (NFI) after suffering a torn ACL in the offseason. He was placed on the reserve/COVID-19 list by the team on December 7, 2020, and moved back to the NFI list on December 11. He was released on February 19, 2021.

=== Miami Dolphins ===
Palardy signed a one-year contract with the Miami Dolphins on March 15, 2021. In Week 13, Palardy had six punts, with a long of 65, including three landing inside the 20-yard line in a 20–9 win over the New York Giants, earning AFC Special Teams Player of the Week. In the 2021 season, Palardy had 78 punts with a 44.73 average.

=== New England Patriots ===
On October 27, 2022, Palardy was hosted for a workout with the New England Patriots, following a poor performance from Jake Bailey the previous game. On November 1, Palardy signed with the Patriots' practice squad. He was promoted to the active roster on November 19, 2022, following an injury to Bailey. He appeared in eight games for the Patriots in the 2022 season. He had 42 punts with a 42.40 average.

=== Washington Commanders ===
On August 20, 2023, Palardy signed with the Washington Commanders, but was released three days later.

=== Arizona Cardinals ===
On December 11, 2024, the Arizona Cardinals signed Palardy to their practice squad. On December 18, he was signed to their active roster.

== NFL career statistics ==
Legend
**Bold**	Career high

=== Regular season ===
Year	Team	Punting									
Year	Team	GP	Punts	Yds	Net Yds	Lng	Avg	Net Avg	Blk	Ins20	TB
2016	CAR	7	36	1,531	1,365	56	42.5	37.9	0	13	2
2017	CAR	16	71	3,269	3,013	63	**46.0**	**42.4**	0	25	4
2018	CAR	16	61	2,759	2,498	59	45.2	41.0	0	24	4
2019	CAR	16	75	3,452	2,905	62	**46.0**	38.7	0	25	3
2021	MIA	**17**	**78**	**3,489**	**3,127**	**65**	44.7	40.1	0	**31**	**5**
2022	NE	8	42	1,781	1,559	58	42.4	36.3	**1**	10	**5**
Career		80	363	16,281	14,467	65	44.9	39.7	1	128	23

=== Playoffs ===
Year	Team	Punting									
Year	Team	GP	Punts	Yds	Net Yds	Lng	Avg	Net Avg	Blk	Ins20	TB
2017	CAR	**1**	**3**	**145**	**128**	**53**	**48.3**	**42.7**	0	**1**	0
Career		1	3	145	128	53	48.3	42.7	0	1	0

== Coaching career ==
Palardy signed with Athletes Untapped as a private football coach on Apr 18, 2024.
