= Fabian Weitz =

Canadian gridiron football player (born 1998)

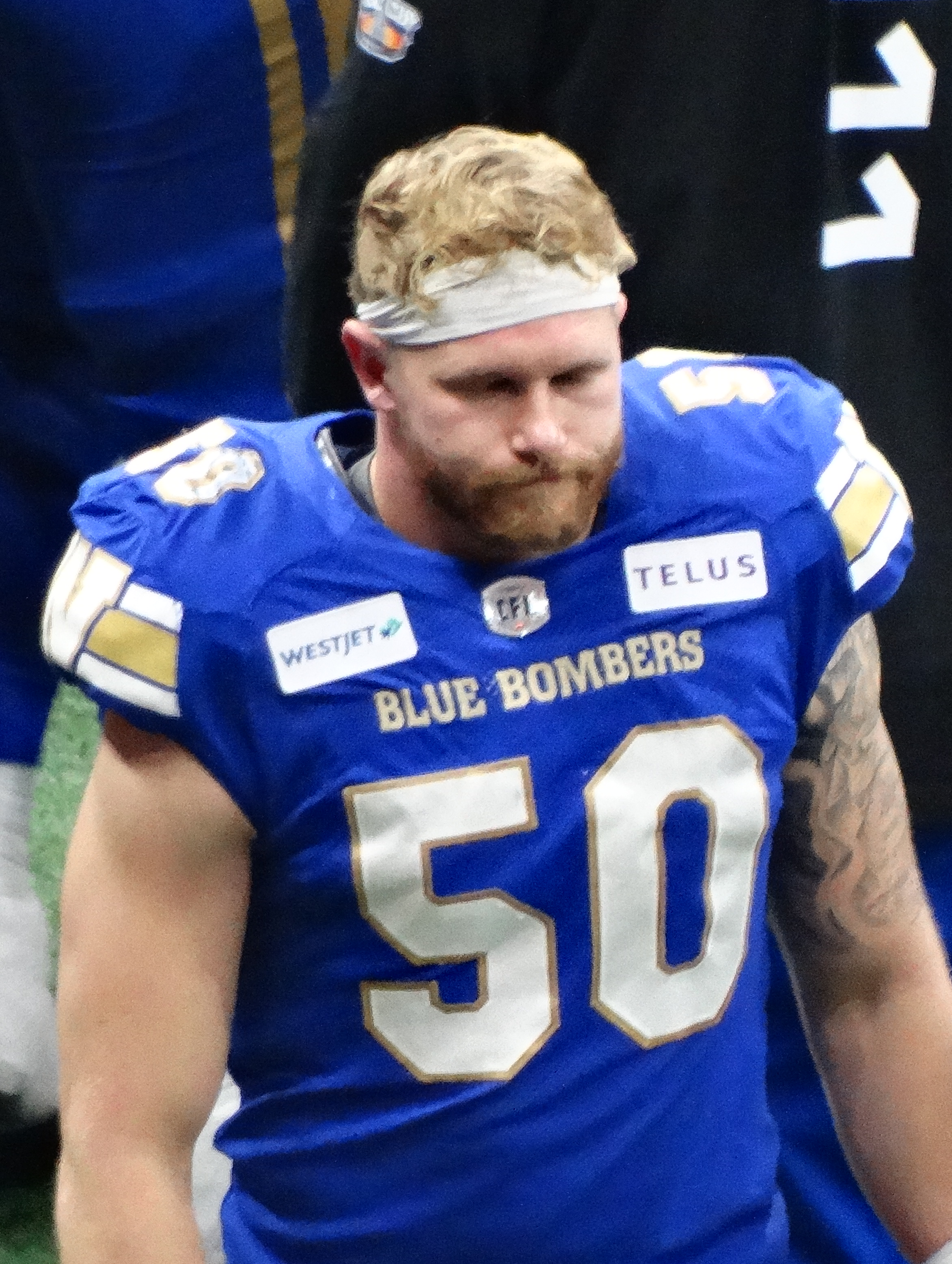
- Weitz with the Winnipeg Blue Bombers in 2024

Frankfurt Galaxy
- Position: Linebacker
- Roster status: Active
- CFL status: Global

Personal information
- Born: February 6, 1998 (age 28); Cologne, North Rhine-Westphalia, Germany
- Listed height: 5 ft 11 in (1.80 m)
- Listed weight: 228 lb (103 kg)

Career information
- College: Buffalo
- CFL draft: 2024G: 1st round, 8th overall pick

Career history
- 2023: Cologne Centurions
- 2024–2025: Winnipeg Blue Bombers
- 2026–present: Frankfurt Galaxy
- Stats at CFL.ca

Fabian Weitz (born February 6, 1998) is a German professional football linebacker for the Frankfurt Galaxy of the European Football Alliance. He previously played for the Winnipeg Blue Bombers of the Canadian Football League (CFL).

== Youth career ==
Weitz spent his youth career playing in the youth departments of the Cologne Falcons and the Cologne Crocodiles.

== College career ==
Weitz played college football for the Buffalo Bulls from 2018 to 2019 and 2021 to 2022, including a redshirt season in 2018. He played in 22 games over four seasons with the team where he had 12 total tackles.

== Professional career ==
=== Cologne Centurions ===
On July 18, 2023, Weitz signed with his hometown team, the Cologne Centurions. In the 2023 season, he played in five games where he had 20 tackles and a fumble recovery.

=== Winnipeg Blue Bombers ===
Weitz was drafted in the first round, eighth overall by the Winnipeg Blue Bombers in the 2024 CFL global draft and signed with the team on May 8, 2024. Following training camp in 2024, he accepted a practice roster spot with the team. Weitz then made his CFL debut on August 23, 2024, against the Hamilton Tiger-Cats. He played in seven regular season games where he had one special teams tackle. He did not play in the West Final, but he made his post-season debut in the 111th Grey Cup where the Blue Bombers lost to the Toronto Argonauts.

In 2025, Weitz played in four regular season games. He finished the season on the practice roster and his contract expired on November 2, 2025.

=== Frankfurt Galaxy ===
On July 30, 2026, Weitz signed with the Frankfurt Galaxy of the European Football Alliance.
