= James Murphy (gridiron football) =

American gridiron football player (born 1959)

No. 21
- Position: Wide receiver

Personal information
- Born: October 10, 1959 (age 67); DeLand, Florida, U.S.
- Listed height: 5 ft 10 in (1.78 m)
- Listed weight: 150 lb (68 kg)

Career information
- College: Utah State
- NFL draft: 1981: 10th round, 266th overall pick

Career history
- 1981: Kansas City Chiefs
- 1982–1990: Winnipeg Blue Bombers

Awards and highlights
- 3× Grey Cup champion (1984, 1988, 1990); Grey Cup MVP (1988); CFL's Outstanding Player Award (1986); Jeff Nicklin Memorial Trophy (1986); 2× CFL All-Star (1986, 1988); 4× CFL East All-Star (1986–1989)
- Stats at Pro Football Reference
- Canadian Football Hall of Fame (Class of 2000)

James Jessie Murphy (born October 10, 1959) was a receiver for eight seasons with the Winnipeg Blue Bombers of the Canadian Football League (CFL).

== Career ==
Murphy played for the Bombers from 1982 to 1990. He was named the league's Most Outstanding Player in 1986 and was a two-time All-Star. He helped the Bombers to three Grey Cup victories and finished his career with 9,036 receiving yards, which was the Blue Bombers record until it was broken by Milt Stegall.

He was elected into the Canadian Football Hall of Fame in 2000 and was selected as one of the Blue Bombers 20 All-Time Greats in 2005.

Murphy was inducted into the Manitoba Sports Hall of Fame in 2009.
