= Brandon Alexander =

American gridiron football player (born 1993)

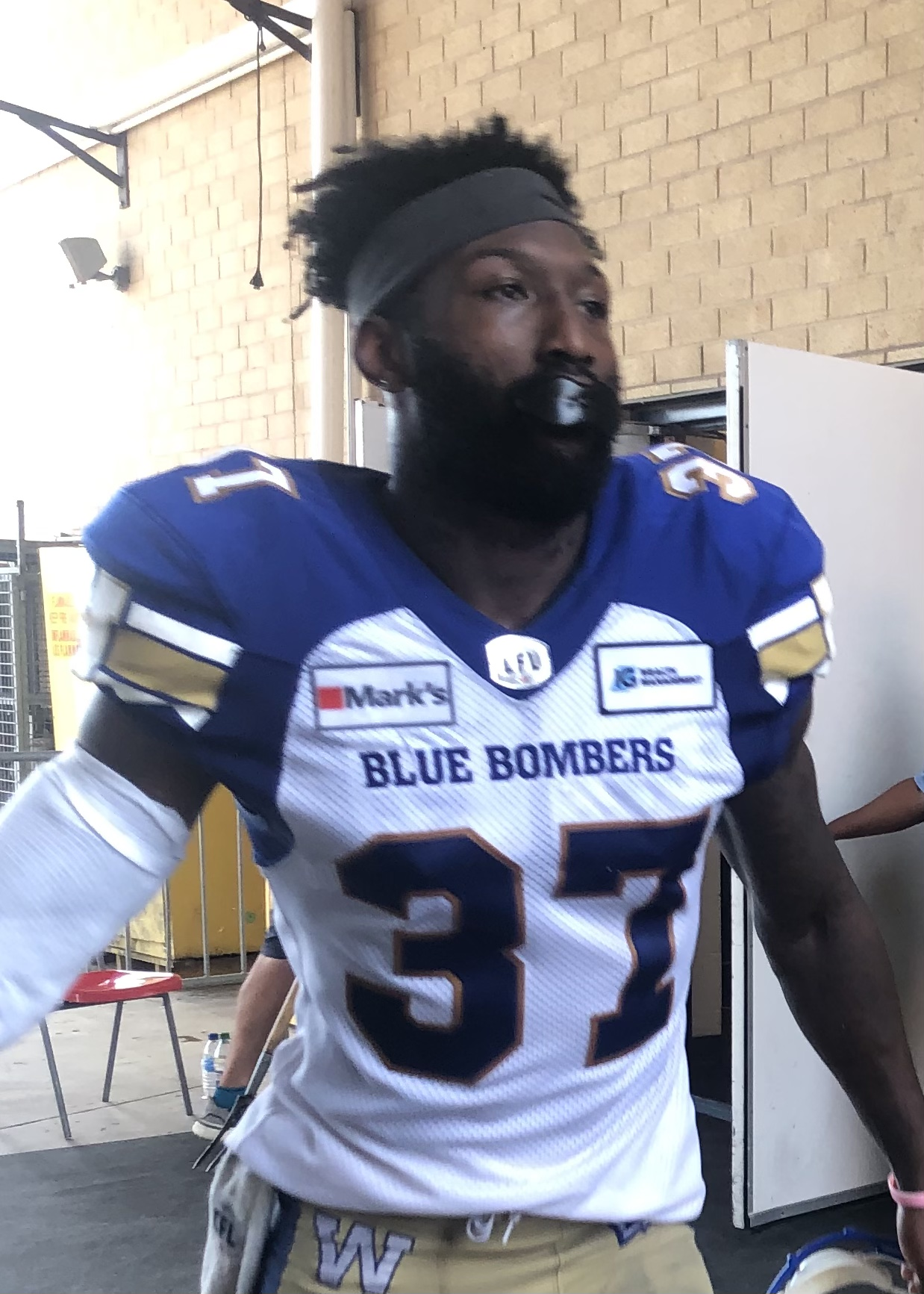
- Alexander with the Winnipeg Blue Bombers in 2021

Profile
- Position: Defensive back

Personal information
- Born: September 27, 1993 (age 33); Orlando, Florida, U.S.
- Listed height: 6 ft 0 in (1.83 m)
- Listed weight: 190 lb (86 kg)

Career information
- College: Central Florida

Career history
- 2015: Atlanta Falcons*
- 2017–2024: Winnipeg Blue Bombers
- * Offseason or practice squad member only

Awards and highlights
- 2× Grey Cup champion (2019, 2021); CFL All-Star (2021); 2× CFL West All-Star (2021, 2023); Second-team All-AAC (2014)

Career CFL statistics
- Games played: 90
- Def. tackles: 268
- ST tackles: 20
- Interceptions: 8
- Quarterback sacks: 0
- Forced fumbles: 7
- Stats at CFL.ca

Brandon Alexander (born September 27, 1993) is an American professional football defensive back. He most recently played for the Winnipeg Blue Bombers of the Canadian Football League (CFL). He is a two-time Grey Cup champion after winning with Blue Bombers in 2019 and 2021.

== College career ==
Alexander played college football for the UCF Knights from 2011 to 2014.

== Professional career ==
Following his collegiate career, Alexander was undrafted in the 2015 CFL draft, but had a mini-camp tryout with the Atlanta Falcons of the National Football League (NFL).

On April 17, 2017, Alexander signed with the Winnipeg Blue Bombers. After earning a starting position following training camp, he played and started in 15 regular season games while missing three due to injury. He had 52 defensive tackles, four special teams tackles, four pass knockdowns, two forced fumbles, and one interception that he returned for a touchdown. For his outstanding season in 2017, Alexander was the team's nominee for the most outstanding rookie in the CFL.

In 2018, Alexander played and started in 14 regular season games where he recorded 36 defensive tackles, four special teams tackles, four pass knockdowns, two forced fumbles, and three interceptions. In the 2019 season, he played in just ten regular season games where he had 38 defensive tackles, four special teams tackles, and four pass knockdowns. He played in all three of the team's post-season games, including his first Grey Cup appearance. Alexander won the 107th Grey Cup with the Blue Bombers when they defeated the Hamilton Tiger-Cats 33–12. He had an interception early in that game when he picked Dane Evans' first pass of the game, which was one of seven turnovers created by Winnipeg.

Alexander did not play in 2020 due to the cancellation of the 2020 CFL season. He signed a one-year contract extension with the Blue Bombers on January 11, 2021. Throughout the 2021 season, Alexander continued to build his reputation as a hard hitting safety for the Blue Bombers. While being named both a CFL West All-Star and CFL All-Star at safety for the first time, Alexander helped solidify the Blue Bombers' secondary and recorded 36 defensive tackles, two interceptions, and one forced fumble as part of a defence that allowed a league-low 12.9 points per game. He made a second appearance in the Grey Cup when the team qualified for the 108th Grey Cup against the hometown Hamilton Tiger-Cats. Alexander would go on to contribute two defensive tackles before suffering a knee injury as the Bombers would go on to win their second consecutive Grey Cup in overtime by a score of 33–25.

After recovering from a knee injury sustained in the 108th Grey Cup game, Alexander missed the first 13 games of the 2022 season. He played in the final five regular season games where he had eight defensive tackles and a forced fumble. He also played in the 109th Grey Cup where he recorded four defensive tackles in the loss to the Toronto Argonauts. In 2023, Alexander played in 17 regular season games where he had 41 defensive tackles, one pass knockdown, and two interceptions. He also played in both post-season games, including the 110th Grey Cup where he had three defensive tackles and one forced fumble in the loss to the Montreal Alouettes.

Alexander played in 16 regular season games in 2024 where he had a career-high 57 defensive tackles and one forced fumble. He played in his fifth consecutive Grey Cup game where he had three defensive tackles and one special teams tackle in the Blue Bombers' 111th Grey Cup loss to the Argonauts. He became a free agent upon the expiry of his contract on February 11, 2025.

== Personal life ==
Alexander's father, Derrick, played at defensive end for five years in the NFL.
