= Justin Palardy =

Canadian football player (born 1988)

No. 17
- Positions: Kicker, Punter

Personal information
- Born: May 24, 1988 (age 38); Truro, Nova Scotia
- Listed height: 5 ft 11 in (1.80 m)
- Listed weight: 190 lb (86 kg)

Career information
- High school: Cobequid Educational Centre
- University: Saint Mary's
- CFL draft: 2010: 5th round, 36th overall pick

Career history
- 2010: Hamilton Tiger-Cats
- 2010–2013: Winnipeg Blue Bombers
- 2014: Ottawa Redblacks*
- 2014: Saskatchewan Roughriders*
- 2015: Toronto Argonauts
- * Offseason or practice squad member only
- Stats at CFL.ca (archive)

Justin Palardy (born May 24, 1988) is a Canadian former professional football placekicker. He was drafted 36th overall by the Hamilton Tiger-Cats in the 2010 CFL draft and was used as a punter. After being released by the Tiger-Cats, he was signed by the Winnipeg Blue Bombers as their placekicker, where he played for four seasons. Palardy also spent some time on the Ottawa Redblacks roster. In the 2010 season, he set the Blue Bombers single season record for place-kicking accuracy with 86.7%, a feat he would equal in 2012. He played CIS football for the Saint Mary's Huskies.

== University career ==
=== Saint Mary's University ===
Palardy attended Saint Mary's University where he played university football for the Huskies as the team's placekicker and punter from 2006-2009. He earned AUS All-Star kicker three times, twice as a punter and was named to the CIS 2nd All Canadian Team. Palardy also earned rookie of the year for both the AUS and SMU in 2006 and was named SMU MVP after the 2009 season. In his four years with the Huskies, Palardy was a part of three straight AUS championships and a 2007 Uteck Bowl win.

==== AUS records ====
Most career points (320) Most career field goal (65) Most career converts (116) Most field goals in a season (23)

==== SMU records ====
Most career points (320) Most career field goal (65) Most career converts (116) Most field goals in a season (23) Most points in a season (96)

== Professional career ==
=== Hamilton Tiger-Cats ===
Palardy’s was drafted by the Hamilton Tiger-Cats in the fifth round (36th overall) of the 2010 CFL Draft. He began the year as the Tiger-Cats punter and played in five games for Hamilton, punting the ball 27 times for an average of 42.1 yards before being released in August.

=== Winnipeg Blue Bombers ===
==== 2010 season ====
He signed with Winnipeg in August 2010 and became their field-goal kicker after Louie Sakoda injured his calf muscle in a pregame warmup. Palardy connected on 26 of 30 field goals for a Blue Bomber single-season record of 86.7%.

==== 2011 season ====
In his first full season with the Blue Bombers, Palardy played in all 18 games and connected on 40 of 52 field goals for a 76.9% accuracy rating. On four separate occasions, he kicked at least four field goals in one game and hit on all five of his attempts on Oct 28/11 against the Toronto Argonauts. Palardy also averaged 57.1 yards on 70 kickoffs. Palardy also kicked 100% in the playoffs making two field goals in the East Final and three field goals in the 99th Grey Cup.

==== 2012 season ====
Palardy was once again a consistent point-getter for the Blue Bombers, tying the franchise’s single-season field goal percentage record of 86.7%, the same record he set in his rookie season. He started the year by missing only one field goal in his first 14 attempts and also had a streak of 14 straight between Sep 9/12 and Nov 3/12. Palardy completed 39 of 45 field goals overall and also averaged a career-high 57.3 yards on 70 kickoffs. He was named the CFL’s Special Teams Player of the Week for the second time in his career after connecting on all five of his attempts on Jul 18/12 against the Toronto Argonauts and was the team’s Most Outstanding Special Teams Player nominee at the end of the season. His career field-goal percentage mark of 82.7% is currently an all-time team-best.

==== 2013 season ====
Palardy started the season completed 9 of 12 field goals, before being replaced by Sandro DeAngelis in the middle of the season. On August 27, 2013, Palardy was released by the Blue Bombers.

=== Ottawa Redblacks ===
Palardy was signed by the expansion Ottawa Redblacks on March 6, 2014. In two preseason games with the Redblacks, Palardy punted the ball 20 times for an average of 41.6. He also went 1 for 2 in field goals. Palardy's 44 yard field goal in Saskatchewan was the first ever made field goal in Redblacks history. Palardy was released as one of the Redblacks preseason cuts in June 2014.

=== Saskatchewan Roughriders ===
On August 18, 2014, Palardy signed a practice roster agreement with the Saskatchewan Roughriders, after the Roughriders were looking for a veteran kicker to compete with kicker Christopher Milo. Palardy was released on October 8, 2014.

=== Toronto Argonauts ===
Palardy was signed by the Toronto Argonauts to a practice roster agreement on September 24, 2015 following an injury to incumbent kicker Swayze Waters. Palardy played in five games with the Argos connecting on 8 of 11 field goals and punted the ball 17 times for a 44.4 average. While with the Argonauts, he was teammates with fellow kicker Michael Palardy, who was also signed by the team in September 2015. They are not related.
