= Nic Demski =

Canadian gridiron football player (born 1993)

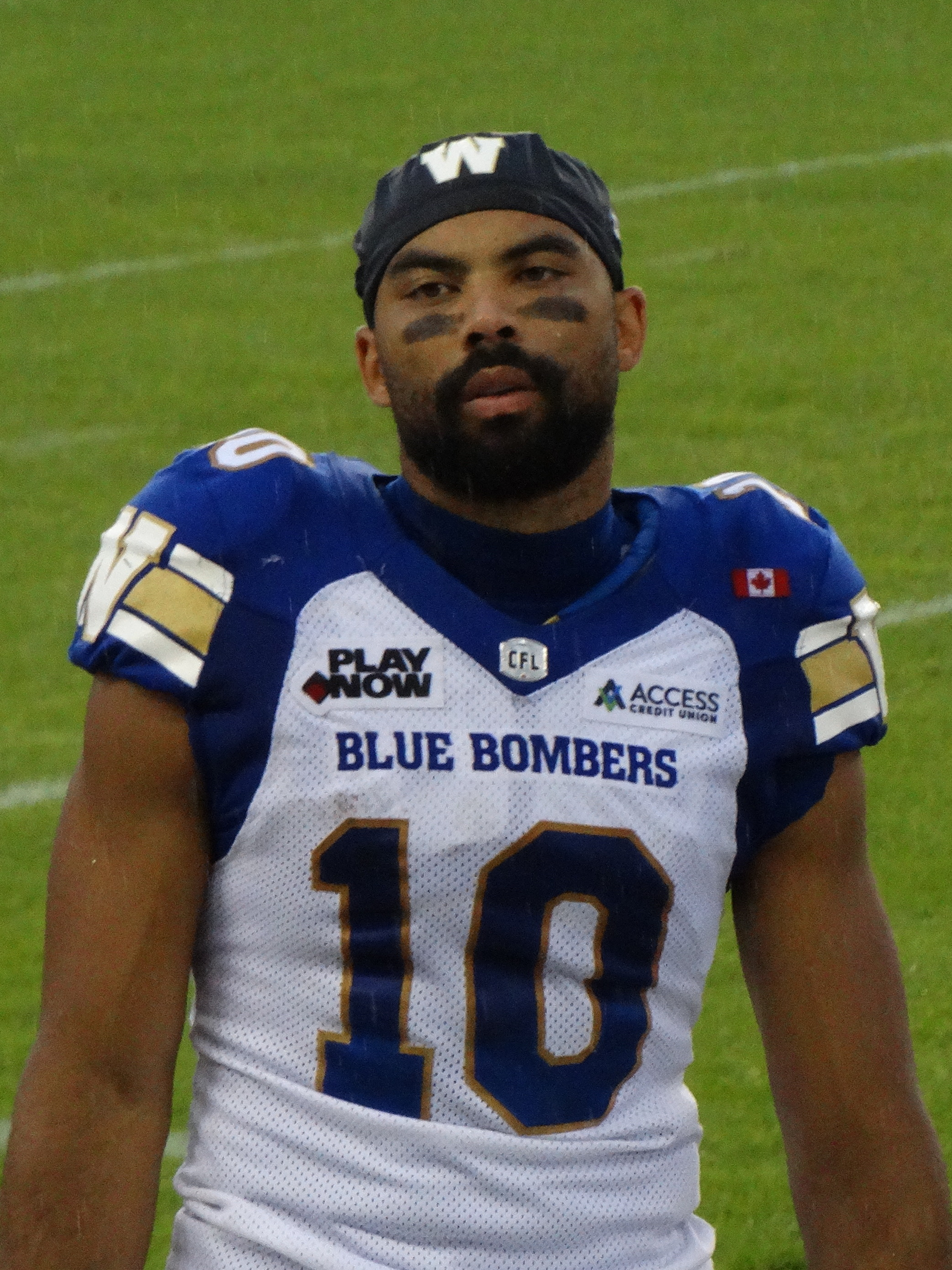
- Demski with the Winnipeg Blue Bombers in 2025

No. 10 – Winnipeg Blue Bombers
- Position: Slotback
- Roster status: Active
- CFL status: National

Personal information
- Born: December 14, 1993 (age 32); Winnipeg, Manitoba, Canada
- Listed height: 5 ft 11 in (1.80 m)
- Listed weight: 211 lb (96 kg)

Career information
- University: Manitoba
- CFL draft: 2015: 1st round, 6th overall pick

Career history
- Saskatchewan Roughriders (2015–2017); Winnipeg Blue Bombers (2018–present)

Awards and highlights
- 2× Grey Cup champion (2019, 2021); 5× CFL West All-Star (2021, 2022, 2023, 2024, 2025); Grey Cup Most Valuable Canadian (2021)

Career CFL statistics as of 2025
- Games played: 152
- Receptions: 494
- Receiving yards: 6,285
- Receiving touchdowns: 42
- Rushing yards: 897
- Rushing touchdowns: 4
- Stats at CFL.ca

Nic Demski (born December 14, 1993) is a Canadian professional football slotback for the Winnipeg Blue Bombers of the Canadian Football League (CFL). He is a two-time Grey Cup champion after winning with the Blue Bombers in 2019 and 2021.

== Junior career ==
Demski started playing football at the young age of seven with the Charleswood Broncos as a runningback. He then started playing football for the Oak Park Raiders where he played QB in grade 10 before moving to runningback and slotback. In his final high school year he was the MVP of the championship game which the Raiders won, was named the league's offensive player of the year and an all-star for the Winnipeg High School Football League.

Following his secondary school years Demski joined the University of Manitoba Bisons where he was named a CIS All-Canadian and Canada West All-Star in each of his four seasons with the team. Demski was the first Bison to be named to four CIS All-Star teams. He finished his career with the Bisons ranked fourth in total touchdowns (21), seventh in receiving yards (1,577), fifth in kickoff-return yards (899) and fifth in punt-return yards (941).

== Professional career ==
=== Saskatchewan Roughriders ===
Demski was considered a top prospect in the 2015 CFL draft and was selected by the Saskatchewan Roughriders with the sixth overall pick. He played for the Roughriders from 2015 to 2017. Demski was en route for a breakout season in 2017 before his season was ended by injury with a broken foot in the Labour Day Classic.

=== Winnipeg Blue Bombers ===
On February 13, 2018, Demski signed a free agent contract that included a significant signing bonus with his hometown Winnipeg Blue Bombers. Demski had 59 catches for 554 yards and a career high three touchdowns during the 2018 season. Demski also picked up additional use as a runner, rushing for a career high 248 yards, and his first rushing touchdown on 34 attempts.

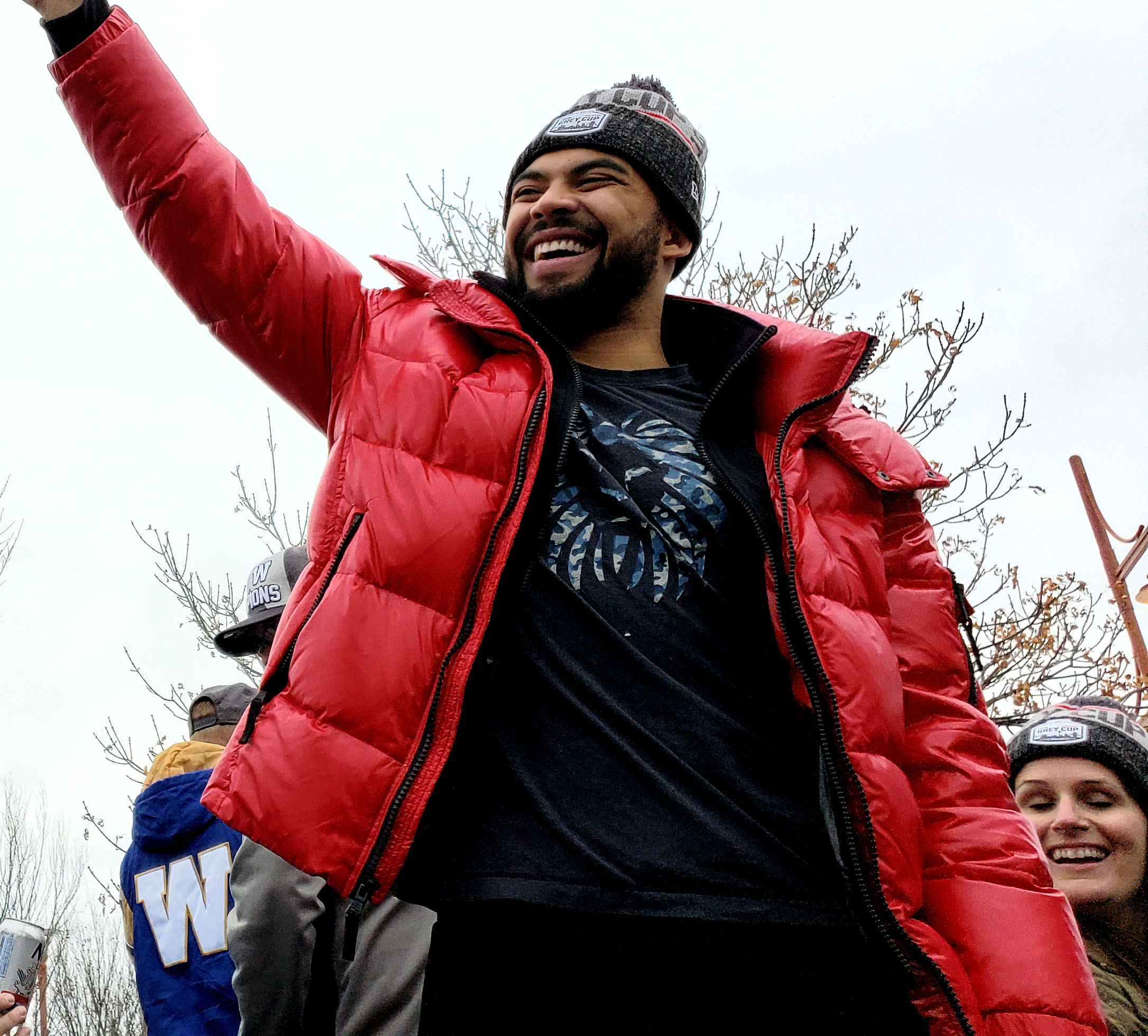
Demski at the 2019 Grey Cup parade.

Winnipeg signed Demski to a new two-year contract several hours into free agency in 2019, on February 12, 2019. In a week 4 game against Ottawa, during the 2019 CFL season, Matt Nichols connected with Demski on an 82-yard touchdown, which was the longest of Demski's career. Nichols and Demski hooked up for another catch-and-run touchdown in the next game, at home against the Argonauts, this time for 67 yards. Demski continue to play a critical role as a slotback receiver for the Blue Bombers. He helped the team upset the Hamilton Tiger-Cats as Winnipeg won the 107th Grey Cup 33–12, ending a 29-year championship drought. Demski was one of a few Winnipeg born players on the team and after the win he said, "It's crazy, it's nuts. Just to be on a championship (team) wearing blue. We're able to bring this Cup back home after the drought they had. It feels great. I don’t have any words for it. I'm proud of this team and I'm proud of this organization. I just can't wait to get home to Winnipeg and celebrate with our fans."

After the pandemic cancelled the 2020 CFL season, Demski signed a two-year contract extension with the team on January 5, 2021. This allowed him to play a part in the Bomber's title defence season as the team finished with the best record in the CFL that year, at 11–3. He finished the 2021 season with 48 catches for 654 yards and four touchdowns in 12 games. When the Bombers hosted their first West Division Final since 1972, Demski had six catches for 51 yards, helping the team to their second consecutive Grey Cup game. During the 108th Grey Cup, Demski and the team were frustrated by the Hamilton Tiger-Cats and trailed 22-10 late in the fourth quarter. Demski had a catch and cut back from the two defenders at the 15 yard line, scoring the Bombers' first touchdown. The Blue Bombers would force overtime where they won their second Grey Cup in a row. Demski finished with four catches for 27 yards and one touchdown and was named the Grey Cup's Most Valuable Canadian.

Demski played in the first three games of the 2022 season before suffering an ankle injury which caused him to miss five games. He finished with 64 receptions for 772 yards and a career-high ten touchdown catches in just 13 games played. In the 109th Grey Cup, he had three catches for 23 yards and two carries for five yards in the Blue Bombers' 24–23 loss to the Toronto Argonauts. In 2023, Demski played in 17 regular season games where he had 67 receptions for 1,006 yards and six touchdowns as he recorded his first 1,000-yard season. He also played in the 110th Grey Cup where he recorded eight receptions for 74 yards and two carries for one yard, but the Blue Bombers lost their second straight championship, this time to the Montreal Alouettes.

In the 2024 season, Demski played in all 18 regular season games where he recorded career-highs in receptions and yards, with 76 and 1,030, respectively and also had six receiving touchdowns. He played in his fifth straight Grey Cup game, recording just two catches for 18 yards in the 111th Grey Cup loss to the Toronto Argonauts.

== Statistics ==
		Games		Receiving					Rushing
Year	Team	GP	GS	Rec	Yards	Avg	TD	Long	Att	Yards	Avg	TD
2015	SSK	14	6	13	165	12.7	0	72	6	30	5.0	0
2016	SSK	17	14	37	338	9.1	2	53	3	8	2.7	0
2017	SSK	9	6	19	222	11.7	1	35	0	0	0.0	0
2018	WPG	17	17	59	554	9.4	3	42	34	248	7.3	1
2019	WPG	17	17	44	543	12.3	3	82	26	147	5.7	2
2020	WPG	Season cancelled
2021	WPG	12	12	48	654	13.6	4	54	13	87	6.7	1
2022	WPG	13	13	64	772	12.1	10	50	20	151	7.6	0
2023	WPG	17	16	67	1,006	15.0	6	70	19	142	7.5	0
2024	WPG	18	18	76	1,030	15.0	6	54	6	17	2.8	0
2025	WPG	16	16	67	1,001	14.9	7	74	9	67	7.4	0
CFL totals		152	135	494	6,285	12.7	42	82	136	897	6.6	4
