= Brady Oliveira =

Canadian gridiron football player (born 1997)

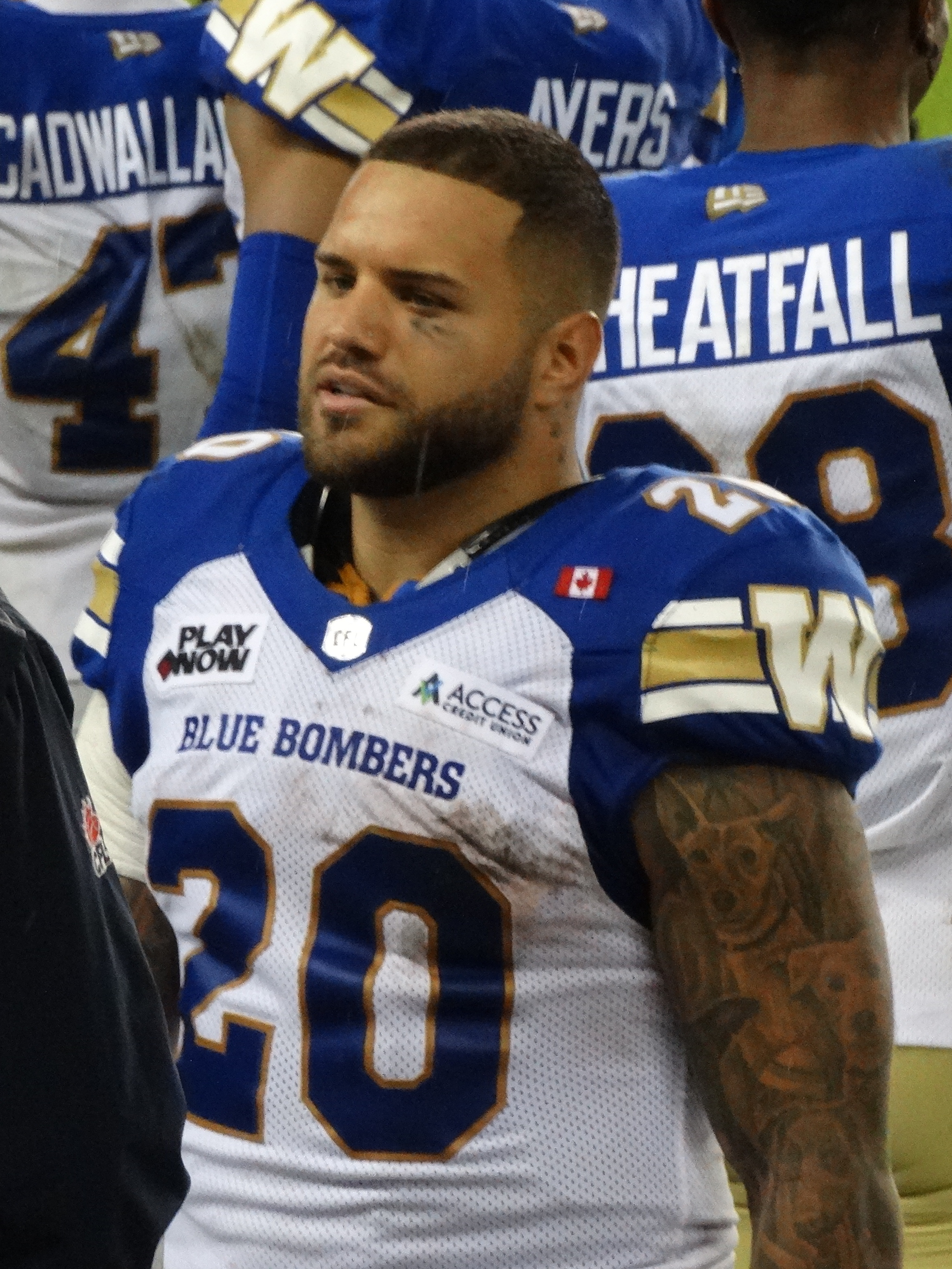
- Oliveira with the Winnipeg Blue Bombers in 2025

No. 20 – Winnipeg Blue Bombers
- Position: Running back
- Roster status: Active
- CFL status: National

Personal information
- Born: August 15, 1997 (age 29); Winnipeg, Manitoba, Canada
- Listed height: 5 ft 9 in (1.75 m)
- Listed weight: 226 lb (103 kg)

Career information
- High school: Oak Park
- College: North Dakota
- CFL draft: 2019: 2nd round, 14th overall pick

Career history
- Winnipeg Blue Bombers (2019–present)

Awards and highlights
- 2× Grey Cup champion (2019, 2021); CFL Most Outstanding Player (2024); 2× CFL's Most Outstanding Canadian (2023, 2024); 2× Jeff Nicklin Memorial Trophy (2023, 2024); 2× Dr. Beattie Martin Trophy (2023, 2024); Eddie James Memorial Trophy (2023); 2× CFL All-Star (2023, 2024); 3× CFL West All-Star (2023, 2024, 2026); 3× CFL rushing yards leader (2023, 2024, 2026); CFL rushing touchdowns co-leader (2023); Hero Sports Sophomore All-American (2016); Third-team All-Big Sky Conference (2016)

Career CFL statistics as of 2026
- Rushing yards: 6,973
- Rushing average: 5.7
- Rushing touchdowns: 28
- Receptions: 230
- Receiving yards: 2,178
- Receiving touchdowns: 7
- Stats at CFL.ca

Brady Oliveira (born August 15, 1997) is a Canadian professional football running back for the Winnipeg Blue Bombers of the Canadian Football League (CFL). After finishing his college career among the University of North Dakota's all-time leading rushers, he was drafted with the 14th overall pick in the 2019 CFL draft, making him the first overall running back selected. He is a two-time Grey Cup champion after winning with the Blue Bombers in 2019 and 2021. He was also named to the All-CFL team in 2023 and 2024 and also won the CFL's Most Outstanding Canadian Award in both of those years while being named the CFL's Most Outstanding Player in 2024.

== Early life ==
As a youth, Brady initially played soccer due to his father playing the sport but his skills transferred to football. The coach for the North Winnipeg Nomads asked his mother if he could play football as they had an injured player and she allowed the request. Oliveira initially did some kicking before switching to playing receiver and running back. For high school football, he started playing for the school team at Oak Park High School where he became a star player. As a senior at Oak Park, Oliveira was named the Winnipeg High School Football League (WHSFL) Potter Division Offensive Player of the Year after rushing 170 times for 2,220 yards and 34 touchdowns, and catching six passes for 142 yards and two additional touchdowns. In his 370-yard game against Sturgeon High School, he broke the WHSFL record for single-game touchdowns with six.

He was named 2012 WHSFL Rookie of the Year as a sophomore in 2012.

Oliveira spent the 2013 season at the Canada Prep Academy in Ontario.

== College career ==
Oliveira finished his career at UND as the program's 7th all-time leading rusher with 2,822 yards (5.6 yards per carry average).

He earned All-Big-Sky Conference honors in 2016 and 2017. UND competed as an FCS independent school in 2018 with no All-Conference teams applicable. He was named to the 2016 Hero Sports Sophomore All-American team after posting 897 yards and 10 touchdowns.

Oliveira was among 169 nominees for the Allstate Good Works Team recognizing "distinguished accomplishments off the field."

He was invited to and participated in the 2019 College Gridiron Showcase college football all-star event in Fort Worth, Texas.

Oliveira was named one of five finalists for the second annual Jon Cornish Trophy given to the most outstanding Canadian player in collegiate football. Oliveira was named the Red Jarrett Male Athlete of the Year at the 2019 UND Night of Champions as the school's top male athlete.

== Professional career ==
Pre-draft measurables
Height	Weight	Arm length	Hand span	Wingspan	40-yard dash	10-yard split	20-yard split	20-yard shuttle	Three-cone drill	Vertical jump	Broad jump	Bench press
5 ft 9 1/8 in (1.76 m)	228 lb (103 kg)	29 3/4 in (0.76 m)	10 in (0.25 m)	6 ft 1 1/4 in (1.86 m)	4.77 s	1.64 s	2.71 s	4.24 s	6.90 s	33.5 in (0.85 m)	9 ft 10 in (3.00 m)	29 reps
All values from Pro Day

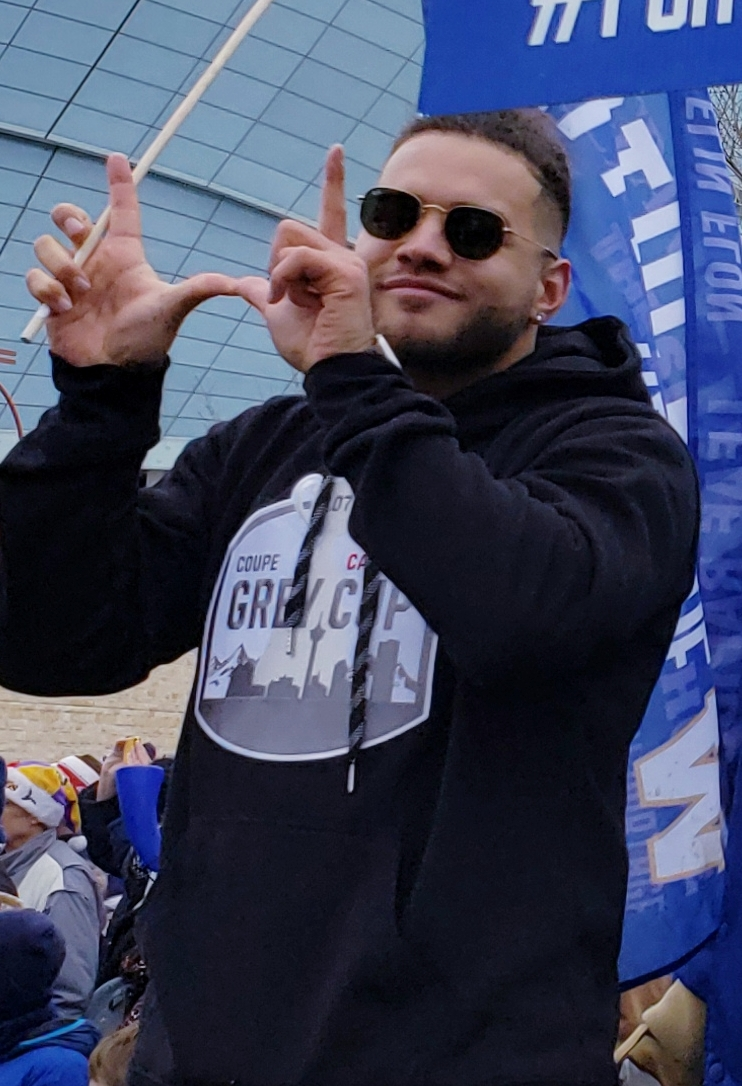
Oliveira at the 2019 Grey Cup parade in Winnipeg

Oliveira went undrafted in the 2019 NFL draft but was selected 14th overall in the 2019 CFL draft by the Winnipeg Blue Bombers. On May 13, 2019, it was announced that he had signed his first professional contract with the Blue Bombers. Oliveira injured his ankle during a Week 3 game against the Edmonton Eskimos while working on the kick return team which required surgery, and as a result he missed the rest of the 2019 CFL season. The Blue Bombers went on to win the 107th Grey Cup with Oliveira on the injured list. He did not play in 2020 due to the cancellation of the 2020 CFL season.

In 2021, Oliveira played in 13 regular season games and started in six with the incumbent starting running back, Andrew Harris, on the injured list. Oliveira had 94 rushing attempts for 429 yards and two touchdowns and nine receptions for 74 yards. He also dressed in both post-season games, including Oliveira's first appearance in a Grey Cup game. He dressed as the back-up running back, and while he did not record any statistics, he earned his second Grey Cup ring as the Blue Bombers defeated the Hamilton Tiger-Cats in the 108th Grey Cup.

On February 7, 2022, the Blue Bombers announced that Oliveira had agreed to a two-year contract extension. That year, he played and started in all 18 regular season games where he rushed for over 1,000 yards for the first time in his CFL career, while also scoring five total touchdowns. He helped Winnipeg finish 15-3 and made another appearance in the Grey Cup that year. In his first start in the championship game, he had 15 carries for 82 yards and one reception for four yards. However, the Blue Bombers lost to the Toronto Argonauts.

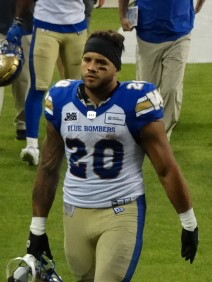
Oliveira with the Blue Bombers in 2022

In 2023, Oliveira rushed for 1,534 yards, the second most by a Canadian in a single season. He also led the league in yards from scrimmage with 2,016 and in touchdowns with 13. For his efforts, he won the CFL's Most Outstanding Canadian award and the Jeff Nicklin Memorial Trophy as the Most Outstanding Player in the West Division and was named a CFL All-Star. Oliveira played in his third Grey Cup game, where he had 19 carries for 119 yards and one touchdown and one reception for eight yards, but the Blue Bombers lost the 110th Grey Cup to the Montreal Alouettes.

In February 2024, Oliveira was eligible to test free agency. However, prior to entering free agency, the Blue Bombers announced that he had signed a two-year contract extension with the team on February 6, 2024. Oliveira was a non-participant for training camp for the 2024 season due to a knee injury, but nonetheless played in the season-opening Grey Cup rematch against the Alouettes. After recording 11 carries for 38 yards and three receptions for 17 yards, he was unable to finish that game after re-aggravating his knee injury. He was inactive for the team's week 2 loss to the Ottawa Redblacks and was named the backup to Johnny Augustine for the Blue Bombers' next game against the BC Lions. However, after the Lions jumped to an early lead, Oliveira began receiving the majority of the snaps in the second quarter and finished the game with nine carries for 64 yards while the Bombers dropped to an 0–3 start to the year. After a fourth straight loss and just 26 rushing yards in the loss to the Stampeders, Oliveira recorded back-to-back 100-yard rushing games in weeks 5 and 6, with both resulting in wins. While he maintained strong production in the following games, he did not score a touchdown until the week 16 game against the Edmonton Elks, where he had 18 carries for 127 yards and two touchdowns. Oliveira finished the year having played in 17 regular season games, starting in 16, where he had 239 carries for 1,353 yards and three rushing touchdowns with 57 carries for 476 yards and one receiving touchdown. At the end of the year, he was named to the All-CFL team and won both the CFL's Most Outstanding Canadian Award and CFL's Most Outstanding Player Award. After recovering from an 0–4 start to finish first in the West Division, the Blue Bombers hosted the West Final where Oliveira had 20 carries for 119 yards and one touchdown and two catches for 22 yards in the victory over the Saskatchewan Roughriders. In his third start in a Grey Cup game, he had 11 carries for 84 yards and one touchdown and two receptions for 18 yards in the 111th Grey Cup loss to the Toronto Argonauts.

Oliveira entered the 2025 season as the league's highest-paid running back and defending Most Outstanding Player. In the team's opening game, he had two carries for 49 yards, including a career-long 43-yard run in the first half where he sustained an injury and was out for the rest of the game. He missed two games due to injury and returned for the team's week 5 game against the Calgary Stampeders. In week 10, also against the Stampeders, he had a season-high nine receptions for 100 receiving yards along with 12 carries for 68 yards. Two weeks later, he recorded his first 100-yard rushing game of the season with 137 yards and one touchdown against the Montreal Alouettes. Oliveira had a strong finish to end the regular season as he had 506 yards rushing and 147 yards receiving in his last five games. With the Blue Bombers already having a guaranteed road playoff game, Oliveira did not play in the team's last game of the regular season. He played and started in 15 regular season games where he had 201 carries for 1,163 yards and three touchdowns. He finished fourth in rushing yards in the league, but led the league in yards-per-carry (among players with a minimum of 50 carries) with a 5.8-yard average. He also had a career-high 61 receptions for 546 yards to finish second in the league for yards-from-scrimmage with 1,709. In the East Semi-Final against the Alouettes, Oliveira had just eight carries for 38 yards and one catch for 19 yards as the Blue Bombers fell behind early and ultimately lost 42–33.

On December 15, 2025, it was announced that Oliveira had signed a three-year extension with the Blue Bombers, keeping him under contract with the team through to the 2028 season. The contract will reportedly pay him $290,000 in 2026, and then $300,000 in 2027 and 2028 with guaranteed money the final year of the contract.

== Career statistics ==
=== CFL ===
		Rushing							Receiving
Year	Team	GP	GS	Att	Yards	Avg	TD	Long	Rec	Yards	Avg	TD
2019	WPG	2	0	0	0	0	0	0	0	0	0	0
2020	WPG	Season cancelled
2021	WPG	13	6	94	429	4.6	2	18	9	74	8.2	0
2022	WPG	18	18	202	1,001	5.0	4	31	23	252	11.0	1
2023	WPG	18	18	260	1,534	5.9	9	36	38	482	12.7	4
2024	WPG	17	16	239	1,353	5.7	3	30	57	476	8.4	1
2025	WPG	15	15	201	1,163	5.8	3	43	61	546	9.0	0
2026	WPG	18	18	237	1,493	6.3	7	63	42	348	9.3	1
CFL totals		101	91	1,234	6,979	5.7	28	63	230	2,178	9.5	7

=== College ===
Year	Team	GP	Rushing						Receiving				
Year	Team	GP	Att	Yds	Avg	Yds/G	Long	TD	Rec	Yds	Avg	Long	TD
2015	UND	8	60	348	5.8	43.5	38	1	5	45	9.0	26	0
2016	UND	12	168	897	5.3	74.8	60	10	6	36	6.0	11	0
2017	UND	11	111	637	6.7	57.9	57	3	5	56	11.2	23	0
2018	UND	11	161	940	5.8	85.5	68	8	9	104	11.6	34	0
Total		42	500	2,822	5.6	67.2	68	22	25	241	9.6	34	0

== Personal life ==
Oliveira's father Adail, was a soccer player in Brazil and kickboxer in Canada. His father was absent through much of his family's life, appearing sometimes and disappearing other times. They lived in co-op housing and Oliveira took up jobs such as mowing grass and delivering flyers to help support his mother and family including buying a cellphone and helping to buy groceries.

His brother Kyle is a mixed martial artist and boxer. His sister got a soccer scholarship to the University of Winnipeg where she studied criminal justice and later worked at the Manitoba Law Courts.

Oliveira has been featured on multiple episodes of the YouTube channel The Dodo for his contribution of rescuing and fostering animals.

Oliveira appears on the CBC show Must Love Dogs with his partner, rescue influencer Alex Blumberg, produced by Omnifilm Entertainment.
