= 2025 Ottawa Redblacks season =

CFL team season

- General manager: Shawn Burke
- President: Adrian Sciarra
- Head coach: Bob Dyce
- Home stadium: TD Place Stadium

Results
- Record: 4–14
- Division place: 4th, East
- Playoffs: Did not qualify
- Team MOP: Kalil Pimpleton
- Team MODP: Jovan Santos-Knox
- Team MOC: Daniel Adeboboye
- Team MOOL: Dino Boyd
- Team MOST: Kalil Pimpleton
- Team MOR: Keelan White

Uniform
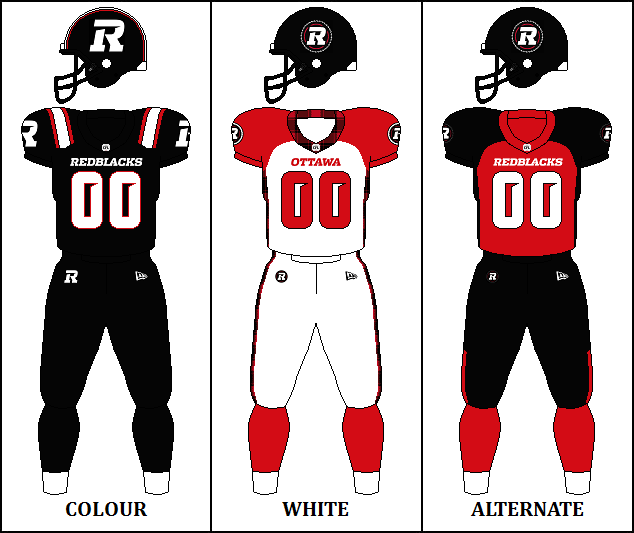

The 2025 Ottawa Redblacks season was the 11th season for the team since re-entering the Canadian Football League in 2014. The Redblacks were unable to qualify for the playoffs after being eliminated from post-season contention in Week 18 following their loss to the Saskatchewan Roughriders. The team finished with a 4–14 record and finished last in the overall league standings.

The 2025 CFL season was the third full season for Bob Dyce as head coach and the fourth season for Shawn Burke as general manager.

The Redblacks drew an average home attendance of 18,136, the second-worst in the league.

== Offseason ==
=== CFL global draft ===
The 2025 CFL global draft took place on April 29, 2025. The Redblacks had two selections in the draft, holding the fifth pick in each round.

Round	Pick	Player	Position	School	Nationality
1	5	Callum Eddings	K/P	Stephen F. Austin	Australia
2	14	James Burnip	P	Alabama	Australia

== CFL national draft ==
The 2025 CFL draft took place on April 29, 2025. The Redblacks had seven selections in the eight-round draft. Not including traded picks or forfeitures, the team selected fifth in each round of the draft after finishing fifth in the 2024 league standings.

Round	Pick	Player	Position	School	Hometown
1	3	Keelan White	WR	Montana	North Vancouver, BC
2	12	Samuel Carson	OL	Louisiana–Monroe	Calgary, AB
4	33	Muftah Ageli	DL	Northwestern Oklahoma State	Windsor, ON
5	42	Eric Cumberbatch	DB	Ottawa	Alexandria, ON
6	51	Ethan Jordan	WR	Wilfrid Laurier	Chatham, ON
7	60	Jayden Griffiths	LB	Wilfrid Laurier	Mississauga, ON
8	68	King Ambers	DB	East Texas A&M	Pickering, ON

== Preseason ==
=== Schedule ===
Week	Game	Date	Kickoff	Opponent	Results		TV	Venue	Attendance	Summary
Week	Game	Date	Kickoff	Opponent	Score	Record	TV	Venue	Attendance	Summary
A	Bye									
B	1	Sat, May 24	4:00 p.m. EDT	at Montreal Alouettes	W 23–7	1–0	RDS	Molson Stadium	13,098	Recap
C	2	Fri, May 30	7:00 p.m. EDT	vs. Montreal Alouettes	L 16–24	1–1	TSN/RDS	TD Place Stadium	17,820	Recap

# Games played with white uniforms.

== Regular season ==
=== Standings ===
East Division
Team	GP	W	L	T	Pts	PF	PA	Div	Stk	
Hamilton Tiger-Cats	18	11	7	0	22	525	496	7–1	W1	Details
Montreal Alouettes	18	10	8	0	20	445	430	6–2	L1	Details
Toronto Argonauts	18	5	13	0	10	497	583	2–6	L5	Details
Ottawa Redblacks	18	4	14	0	8	417	537	1–7	L6	Details

=== Schedule ===
Week	Game	Date	Kickoff	Opponent	Results		TV	Venue	Attendance	Summary
Week	Game	Date	Kickoff	Opponent	Score	Record	TV	Venue	Attendance	Summary
1	1	Thu, June 5	9:00 p.m. EDT	at Saskatchewan Roughriders	L 26–31	0–1	TSN/RDS2/CBSSN	Mosaic Stadium	25,973	Recap
2	2	Fri, June 13	7:30 p.m. EDT	vs. Montreal Alouettes	L 18–39	0–2	TSN/RDS	TD Place Stadium	21,441	Recap
3	3	Sat, June 21	4:00 p.m. EDT	at Calgary Stampeders	W 20–12	1–2	TSN/RDS/CBSSN	McMahon Stadium	16,584	Recap
4	4	Sun, June 29	7:00 p.m. EDT	vs. Toronto Argonauts	L 16–29	1–3	TSN/RDS Info/CBSSN	TD Place Stadium	17,700	Recap
5	5	Sun, July 6	7:00 p.m. EDT	at Edmonton Elks	L 33–39	1–4	TSN/RDS/CBSSN	Commonwealth Stadium	16,588	Recap
6	6	Sat, July 12	7:00 p.m. EDT	at Hamilton Tiger-Cats	L 20–23	1–5	TSN/CTV/RDS	Tim Hortons Field	22,913	Recap
7	7	Sun, July 20	7:00 p.m. EDT	vs. Hamilton Tiger-Cats	L 15–30	1–6	TSN/RDS	TD Place Stadium	15,054	Recap
8	Bye									
9	8	Thu, July 31	7:30 p.m. EDT	vs. Calgary Stampeders	W 31–11	2–6	TSN/RDS	TD Place Stadium	16,115	Recap
10	9	Sat, Aug 9	3:00 p.m. EDT	at Toronto Argonauts	W 46–42	3–6	TSN/CTV/RDS/CBSSN	BMO Field	13,297	Recap
11	10	Thu, Aug 14	8:30 p.m. EDT	at Winnipeg Blue Bombers	L 27–30	3–7	TSN/RDS/CBSSN	Princess Auto Stadium	32,343	Recap
12	11	Fri, Aug 22	7:30 p.m. EDT	vs. Edmonton Elks	L 20–30	3–8	TSN/RDS	TD Place Stadium	17,469	Recap
13	Bye									
14	12	Fri, Sept 5	7:30 p.m. EDT	vs. BC Lions	W 34–33	4–8	TSN/RDS2/CBSSN	TD Place Stadium	16,267	Recap
15	13	Fri, Sept 12	10:00 p.m. EDT	at BC Lions	L 27–38	4–9	TSN/RDS/CBSSN	BC Place	19,803	Recap
16	14	Sat, Sept 20	3:00 p.m. EDT	vs. Winnipeg Blue Bombers	L 18–26	4–10	TSN/CTV/RDS	TD Place Stadium	20,033	Recap
17	Bye									
18	15	Fri, Oct 3	7:30 p.m. EDT	vs. Saskatchewan Roughriders	L 13–20	4–11	TSN/RDS	TD Place Stadium	18,250	Recap
19	16	Mon, Oct 13	1:00 p.m. EDT	at Montreal Alouettes	L 10–30	4–12	TSN/RDS/CBSSN	Molson Stadium	23,035	Recap
20	17	Sat, Oct 18	3:00 p.m. EDT	vs. Montreal Alouettes	L 28–39	4–13	TSN/CTV/RDS	TD Place Stadium	20,897	Recap
21	18	Fri, Oct 24	7:00 p.m. EDT	at Hamilton Tiger-Cats	L 15–35	4–14	TSN/RDS	Tim Hortons Field	22,030	Recap

# Games played with colour uniforms.
# Games played with white uniforms.
# Games played with alternate uniforms.

== Roster ==
2025 Ottawa Redblacks final roster
**Quarterbacks**: 7 Tyrie Adams; 18 Dustin Crum; 16 Matt Shiltz; **Running backs**: 25 Daniel Adeboboye; 45 Anthony Gosselin; 31 William Stanback; **Receivers**: 0 Bralon Addison; 17 DeVonte Dedmon; 89 Marco Dubois; 86 Luther Hakunavanhu; 2 Justin Hardy; 87 Geno Lewis; 83 Kalil Pimpleton; 81 Keelan White	**Offensive linemen**: 64 Dino Boyd T; 69 Samuel Carson G; 61 Drew Desjarlais G/T; 51 Peter Godber C; 66 D. J. Jones T; 63 David Knevel G/T; 54 Jacob Ruby G/C; **Defensive linemen**: 75 Muftah Ageli DT; 91 Bryce Carter DE; 93 Aidan John DE; 90 Cleyon Laing DT; 55 Blessman Ta'ala DT; 96 Michael Wakefield DT/DE	**Linebackers**: 19 Lucas Cormier; 32 Jayden Griffiths; 48 Jonathan Jones; 42 James Peter; 5 Jovan Santos-Knox; 43 Davion Taylor; 46 Tyron Vrede; **Defensive backs**: 36 C. J. Coldon; 15 Eric Cumberbatch; 22 Adrian Frye; 21 Justin Howell; 33 Deandre Lamont; 39 Cam Lockridge; 30 Mark Milton; 6 Adarius Pickett	**Special teams**: 53 Peter Adjey LS; 13 Richie Leone P/K; 10 Lewis Ward K; **Practice roster**: 27 King Ambers DB; 35 Elijah Collins RB; 29 Jessie Evans DE; 80 Latreal Jones WR; 74 Deionte Knight DT; 85 Robert Lewis WR; 88 Andre Miller WR; 67 Isaac Moore T; 49 Jamie Pettway LB; 98 Baptiste Pollier DE; 58 Alec Rasmussen T; 38 Kenyon Reed DB	**Injured list**: 20 Alonzo Addae DB; 65 Dariusz Bladek G; 3 Dru Brown QB; 9 Shakur Brown DB; 28 Frankie Griffin LB; 4 Amari Henderson DB; 37 Gavin Heslop DB; 84 Nick Mardner WR; 34 Les Maruo LB; 95 Chase McGowan DE; 59 Parker Moorer T/G; 92 Daniel Okpoko DT/DE; 99 Kene Onyeka DE; 52 Zack Pelehos T; 44 Zach Philion LB; 23 Robert Priester DB; 24 Charlie Ringland DB; 47 Nigel Romick DE; 68 Eric Starczala C; 14 Bennett Williams DB
Italics indicate American player • **Bold** indicates Global player • 45 Roster, 20 Injured, 12 Practice; Roster updated 2025-10-23 • Depth chart • Transactions

== Coaching staff ==
Ottawa Redblacks staff
Front office: Owner – Ottawa Sports and Entertainment Group (OSEG); Chief Executive Officer – Mark Goudie; General Manager – Shawn Burke; Assistant General Manager – Jeremy Snyder; Director of Pro Personnel – Brendan Taman; Director of Canadian Scouting & Football Analytics – Chad Hudson; Assistant Director of US Scouting & Football Operations – Philippe Moreau; Senior Personnel Executive – Drew Allemang; Director of Football Operations – Joe Panessidi; Video Coordinator – Braun Gheller; Equipment Manager – Drew McCormick; Head Coaches: Head Coach – Bob Dyce; Assistant Head Coach/Linebackers – Deion Melvin; Offensive coaches: Offensive Coordinator – Tommy Condell; Offensive Line – Mike Gibson; Receivers – Nate Taylor; Running Backs – Josh Sacobie; Coaching Assistant – Isaiah Johns	Defensive coaches: Defensive Coordinator – William Fields; Defensive Line – Kai Ellis; Defensive Backs – Myron Lewis; Special teams coaches: Special Teams Coordinator – Rick Campbell; Strength and conditioning: Strength and Conditioning Coordinator – Erin Craig; → Coaching staff
