= 2024 Ottawa Redblacks season =

CFL team season

- General manager: Shawn Burke
- President: Adrian Sciarra
- Head coach: Bob Dyce
- Home stadium: TD Place Stadium

Results
- Record: 9–8–1
- Division place: 3rd, East
- Playoffs: Lost East Semi-Final
- Team MOP: Justin Hardy
- Team MODP: Michael Wakefield
- Team MOC: Drew Desjarlais
- Team MOOL: Drew Desjarlais
- Team MOST: Adarius Pickett
- Team MOR: Kalil Pimpleton

Uniform
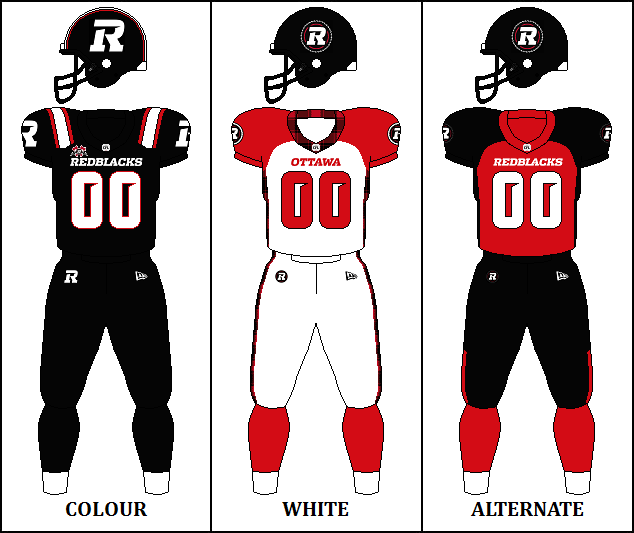

The 2024 Ottawa Redblacks season was the tenth season for the team in the Canadian Football League (CFL). The Redblacks qualified for the playoffs for the first time since 2018 while on a bye during week 18 after a Hamilton Tiger-Cats loss. The team also improved upon their league-worst 4–14 record from 2023. However, the team was defeated by the Toronto Argonauts in the East Semi-Final.

The 2024 CFL season was the second season for Bob Dyce as head coach and the third season for Shawn Burke as general manager.

The Ottawa Redblacks drew an average home attendance of 18,813 in 2024.

== Offseason ==
=== CFL global draft ===
The 2024 CFL global draft took place on April 30, 2024. The Redblacks had two picks in the draft, selecting second in each round.

Round	Pick	Player	Position	Club/School	Nationality
1	2	Matt Hayball	P	Vanderbilt	Australia
2	11	Heston Lameta	LB	Northern Arizona	American Samoa

== CFL national draft ==
The 2024 CFL draft took place on April 30, 2024. The Redblacks are scheduled to have seven selections in the eight-round draft. The Redblacks had seven selections in the eight-round draft. Not including traded picks, the team selected second in each round of the draft after finishing second-last in the 2023 league standings (The Redblacks won the season series with Edmonton).

Round	Pick	Player	Position	School	Hometown
1	2	Nick Mardner	WR	Auburn	Oakville, ON
2	11	Daniel Okpoko	DL	San Diego State	Saskatoon, SK
3	22	Dawson Pierre	DB	Concordia	Longueuil, QC
4	35	Jahquan Bloomfield	WR	Prairie View A&M	Nepean, ON
6	49	Yani Gouadfel	DB	Bishop's	Mitry-Mory, IDF
7	58	Zachary Philion	LB	Concordia	Lorraine, QC
8	67	Russell Dixon	TE	Connecticut	Edmonton, AB

== Preseason ==
=== Schedule ===
Week	Game	Date	Kickoff	Opponent	Results		TV	Venue	Attendance	Summary
Week	Game	Date	Kickoff	Opponent	Score	Record	TV	Venue	Attendance	Summary
A	Bye									
B	1	Sat, May 25	2:00 p.m. EDT	at Hamilton Tiger-Cats	W 31–22	1–0	CFL+	Tim Hortons Field	N/A	Recap
C	2	Fri, May 31	7:30 p.m. EDT	vs. Montreal Alouettes	W 19–13	2–0	TSN/RDS	TD Place Stadium	N/A	Recap

# Games played with white uniforms.

== Regular season ==
=== Standings ===
East Division
Team	GP	W	L	T	Pts	PF	PA	Div	Stk	
Montreal Alouettes	18	12	5	1	25	455	404	6–2	L2	Details
Toronto Argonauts	18	10	8	0	20	513	479	3–5	L1	Details
Ottawa Redblacks	18	9	8	1	19	443	488	3–5	W1	Details
Hamilton Tiger-Cats	18	7	11	0	14	495	557	4–4	L1	Details

=== Schedule ===
The Redblacks will play in a neutral site game against the BC Lions in Victoria on August 31, 2024.

Week	Game	Date	Kickoff	Opponent	Results		TV	Venue	Attendance	Summary
Week	Game	Date	Kickoff	Opponent	Score	Record	TV	Venue	Attendance	Summary
1	Bye									
2	1	Thu, June 13	7:30 p.m. EDT	vs. Winnipeg Blue Bombers	W 23–19	1–0	TSN/RDS	TD Place Stadium	16,310	Recap
3	2	Thu, June 20	7:30 p.m. EDT	at Montreal Alouettes	L 21–47	1–1	TSN/RDS	Molson Stadium	23,035	Recap
4	3	Sun, June 30	7:00 p.m. EDT	vs. Hamilton Tiger-Cats	W 24–22	2–1	TSN/CBSSN/RDS	TD Place Stadium	20,315	Recap
5	4	Fri, July 5	8:30 p.m. EDT	at Winnipeg Blue Bombers	L 16–25	2–2	TSN/RDS	Princess Auto Stadium	28,719	Recap
6	5	Sun, July 14	7:00 p.m. EDT	at Edmonton Elks	W 37–34	3–2	TSN/CBSSN	Commonwealth Stadium	18,362	Recap
7	6	Fri, July 19	7:00 p.m. EDT	vs. Edmonton Elks	W 20–14	4–2	TSN/RDS	TD Place Stadium	18,437	Recap
8	7	Fri, July 26	7:30 p.m. EDT	vs. Calgary Stampeders	W 33–6	5–2	TSN	TD Place Stadium	17,267	Recap
9	Bye									
10	8	Thu, Aug 8	7:30 p.m. EDT	vs. Saskatchewan Roughriders	T 22–22 (2OT)	5–2–1	TSN/RDS	TD Place Stadium	17,180	Recap
11	9	Thu, Aug 15	9:00 p.m. EDT	at Calgary Stampeders	W 31–29	6–2–1	TSN/RDS2	McMahon Stadium	17,692	Recap
12	10	Sat, Aug 24	7:00 p.m. EDT	vs. BC Lions	W 34–27	7–2–1	TSN/RDS2	TD Place Stadium	19,761	Recap
13	11	Sat, Aug 31	7:00 p.m. EDT	BC Lions	L 12–38	7–3–1	TSN/RDS2	Royal Athletic Park	14,727	Recap
14	12	Sat, Sept 7	1:00 p.m. EDT	vs. Toronto Argonauts	W 41–27	8–3–1	TSN/RDS	TD Place Stadium	17,834	Recap
15	13	Sat, Sept 14	3:00 p.m. EDT	at Hamilton Tiger-Cats	L 21–37	8–4–1	CTV/RDS2	Tim Hortons Field	22,119	Recap
16	14	Sat, Sept 21	3:00 p.m. EDT	vs. Montreal Alouettes	L 12–24	8–5–1	CTV/RDS	TD Place Stadium	23,530	Recap
17	15	Sat, Sep 28	3:00 p.m. EDT	at Saskatchewan Roughriders	L 16–29	8–6–1	CTV	Mosaic Stadium	27,676	Recap
18	Bye									
19	16	Mon, Oct 14	1:00 p.m. EDT	at Montreal Alouettes	L 12–19	8–7–1	TSN/RDS/CBSSN	Molson Stadium	23,035	Recap
20	17	Sat, Oct 19	3:00 p.m. EDT	at Toronto Argonauts	L 31–38	8–8–1	CTV	BMO Field	20,487	Recap
21	18	Fri, Oct 25	7:00 p.m. EDT	vs. Hamilton Tiger-Cats	W 37–31	9–8–1	TSN/RDS2	TD Place Stadium	19,689	Recap

# Games played with colour uniforms.
# Games played with white uniforms.
# Games played with alternate uniforms.

== Post-season ==
=== Schedule ===
Game	Date	Kickoff	Opponent	Results		TV	Venue	Attendance	Summary
Game	Date	Kickoff	Opponent	Score	Record	TV	Venue	Attendance	Summary
East Semi-Final	Sat, Nov 2	3:00 p.m. EDT	at Toronto Argonauts	L 38–58	0–1	CTV/TSN/RDS	BMO Field	18,060	Recap

# Games played with colour uniforms.

== Roster ==
2024 Ottawa Redblacks final roster
**Quarterbacks**: 3 Dru Brown; 18 Dustin Crum; 8 Jeremiah Masoli; **Running backs**: 0 Bralon Addison; 45 Anthony Gosselin; **Receivers**: 23 Jaelon Acklin; 87 Keaton Bruggeling; 17 DeVonte Dedmon; 2 Justin Hardy; 84 Nick Mardner; 83 Kalil Pimpleton; 15 Dominique Rhymes	**Offensive linemen**: 65 Dariusz Bladek G; 50 Dontae Bull T; 61 Drew Desjarlais G; 52 Zack Pelehos T; 54 Jacob Ruby T/G; 68 Eric Starczala C; **Defensive linemen**: 58 Bryce Carter DE; 93 Aidan John DE; 90 Cleyon Laing DT; 94 Lorenzo Mauldin DE; 92 Daniel Okpoko DT; 99 Kene Onyeka DE; 47 Nigel Romick DE; 51 Blessman Ta'ala DT; 96 Michael Wakefield DT	**Linebackers**: 28 Frankie Griffin; 48 Gary Johnson; 42 James Peter; 5 Jovan Santos-Knox; 43 Davion Taylor; 46 Tyron Vrede; **Defensive backs**: 19 Lucas Cormier; 37 Brandin Dandridge; 24 Yani Gouadfel; 21 Justin Howell; 4 Money Hunter; 38 Deandre Lamont; 29 Alijah McGhee; 9 Damon Webb; 14 Bennett Williams	**Special teams**: 53 Peter Adjey LS; 13 Richie Leone P/K; 10 Lewis Ward K; **Practice roster**: 81 Rasheed Bailey WR; 44 Dan Basambombo LB; 95 Ronheen Bingham DE; 55 Drake Centers T; 36 C. J. Coldon DB; 88 Maurice Ffrench WR; 41 Tobias Harris DB; 34 Khalan Laborn RB; 35 Heston Lameta LB; 85 Daniel Oladejo SB; 67 Isaac Moore T; 82 Lincoln Victor WR; 57 Héctor Zepeda C	**Injured list**: 7 Tyrie Adams QB; 20 Alonzo Addae DB; 64 Dino Boyd T; 33 Ty Cranston DB; 89 Marco Dubois SB; 22 Adrian Frye DB; 59 Cyrille Hogan-Saindon C; 88 Andre Miller SB; 27 Jamal Morrow RB; 6 Adarius Pickett DB; 30 Dawson Pierre LB; 32 Silas Stewart LB; 80 Eli Stove SB; 1 Devonte Williams RB; **Suspended list**: LeVante Bellamy RB; Russell Dixon SB
Italics indicate American player • **Bold** indicates Global player

== Coaching staff ==
Ottawa Redblacks staff
Front office: Owner – Ottawa Sports and Entertainment Group (OSEG); Chief Executive Officer – Mark Goudie; General Manager – Shawn Burke; Assistant General Manager – Jeremy Snyder; Director of Pro Personnel – Brendan Taman; Director of Canadian Scouting & Football Analytics – Chad Hudson; Pro/College Scout – Philippe Moreau; Video Coordinator – Braun Gheller; Head Coaches: Head Coach – Bob Dyce; Offensive coaches: Offensive Coordinator – Tommy Condell; Offensive Line – Pat Perles; Receivers – Travis Moore; Running Backs – Nate Taylor; Coaches' Assistant – Nadia Doucoure	Defensive coaches: Defensive Coordinator – Barron Miles; Defensive Line – Greg Marshall; Linebackers – Deion Melvin; Defensive Backs – Alex Suber; Special teams coaches: Special Teams Coach – Cory McDiarmid; Strength and conditioning: Strength and Conditioning Coordinator – Nick Mercuri; → Coaching staff
