= Bob Dyce =

Canadian gridiron football coach (born 1965)

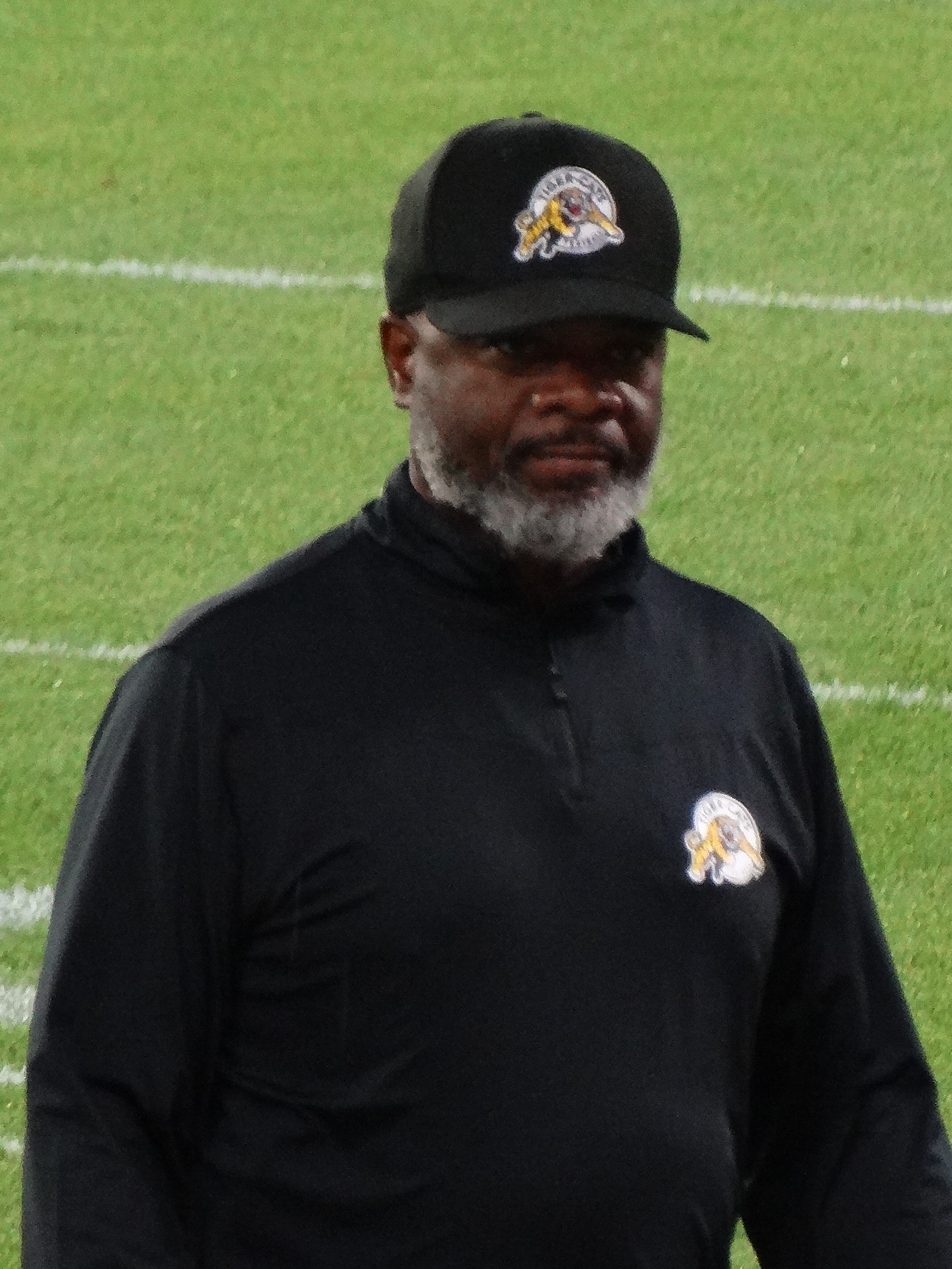
- Dyce with the Hamilton Tiger-Cats in 2026

Hamilton Tiger-Cats
- Title: Special teams coordinator Assistant head coach

Personal information
- Born: December 3, 1965 (age 60); Winnipeg, Manitoba, Canada

Career information
- University: Manitoba

Career history
- 1992–1993: St. Vital Mustangs (CJFL) (assistant coach)
- 1994–1995: Winnipeg Hawkeyes (CJFL) (offensive coordinator) (receivers coach)
- 1996–2002: Manitoba Bisons (CIS) (receivers coach)
- 2003–2009: Winnipeg Blue Bombers (receivers coach)
- 2010–2011: Saskatchewan Roughriders (passing game coordinator) (receivers coach)
- 2012: Saskatchewan Roughriders (offensive coordinator)
- 2013–2015: Saskatchewan Roughriders (special teams coordinator)
- 2015: Saskatchewan Roughriders (interim head coach)
- 2016–2022: Ottawa Redblacks (special teams coordinator)
- 2022–2025: Ottawa Redblacks (head coach)
- 2026–present: Hamilton Tiger-Cats (special teams coordinator) (assistant head coach)

Awards and highlights
- 2× Grey Cup champion (2013, 2016)

Bob Dyce (born December 3, 1965) is a Canadian professional football coach who is the special teams coordinator and assistant head coach for the Hamilton Tiger-Cats of the Canadian Football League (CFL). He has also served as the head coach for the Ottawa Redblacks and Saskatchewan Roughriders. He is a Grey Cup champion after winning as an assistant coach with the Roughriders in 2013 and with the Redblacks in 2016. He attended the University of Manitoba where he played wide receiver with the Manitoba Bisons.

== Coaching career ==
After spending time as an assistant coach in the Canadian Junior Football League and Canadian Interuniversity Sport, Dyce first joined his hometown Winnipeg Blue Bombers as the team's wide receivers coach in 2003. He served in that capacity for seven years before joining the Saskatchewan Roughriders to serve as the passing game coordinator and receivers coach in 2010. He was promoted to offensive coordinator in 2012, but switched to special teams coordinator the following year. The change proved fruitful as Dyce and the Roughriders won the 101st Grey Cup in their home stadium in 2013. He was promoted to head coach on August 31, 2015, following the dismissal of Corey Chamblin after an 0–9 start to the season. Dyce finished with a 3–6 to end the season. He was then replaced as head coach of the Roughriders on December 7, 2015, by former Edmonton Eskimos head coach Chris Jones. On December 18, 2015, Dyce was named the special teams coordinator for the Ottawa Redblacks.

On October 1, 2022, following the firing of head coach Paul LaPolice, Dyce was named the team's interim head coach. The Redblacks won their first match with Dyce in charge, defeating the Montreal Alouettes on October 9, 2022. The team would go on to lose its final three games and finish in last place with only four wins and 14 losses. On November 29, 2022, it was reported by TSN insider Farhan Lalji that Dyce was one of three finalists for the vacant Redblacks head coaching job. On December 2, the Redblacks removed the interim title and named Dyce as their next head coach.

In his first full season as the head coach of the Redblacks, the team continued to struggle and finished with a second consecutive four-win season. In 2024, after the acquisition of quarterback Dru Brown, Dyce led the Redblacks to a 9–8–1 record, including a franchise best 7–1–1 record at home. After finishing in third place in the East Division, the Redblacks faced the Toronto Argonauts where he lost his post-season debut 58–38. In the 2025 season, despite having largely the same roster, the Redblacks reverted to a 4–14 record and Dyce was fired on October 25, 2025.

On January 12, 2026, it was announced that Dyce had joined the Hamilton Tiger-Cats as the team's special teams coordinator and assistant head coach.

== CFL coaching record ==
Team	Year	Regular season					Postseason		
Team	Year	Won	Lost	Ties	Win %	Finish	Won	Lost	Result
SSK	2015	3	6	0	.333	5th in West Division	-	-	Missed playoffs
OTT	2022	1	3	0	.250	4th in East Division	-	-	Missed playoffs
OTT	2023	4	14	0	.222	4th in East Division	-	-	Missed playoffs
OTT	2024	9	8	1	.528	3rd in East Division	0	1	Lost East Semi-Final
OTT	2025	4	14	0	.222	4th in East Division	-	-	Missed playoffs
Total		21	45	1	.241	0 Division; Championships	0	1	0 Grey Cups

== Personal life ==
Dyce and his life partner, Amanda, have their primary residence in Winnipeg. They have three children, Brooklyn, Trysten, and Ava Dyce. Their only son Trysten Dyce, was also a coach in the CFL for five years.
