= Deandre Lamont =

American gridiron football player (born 1995)

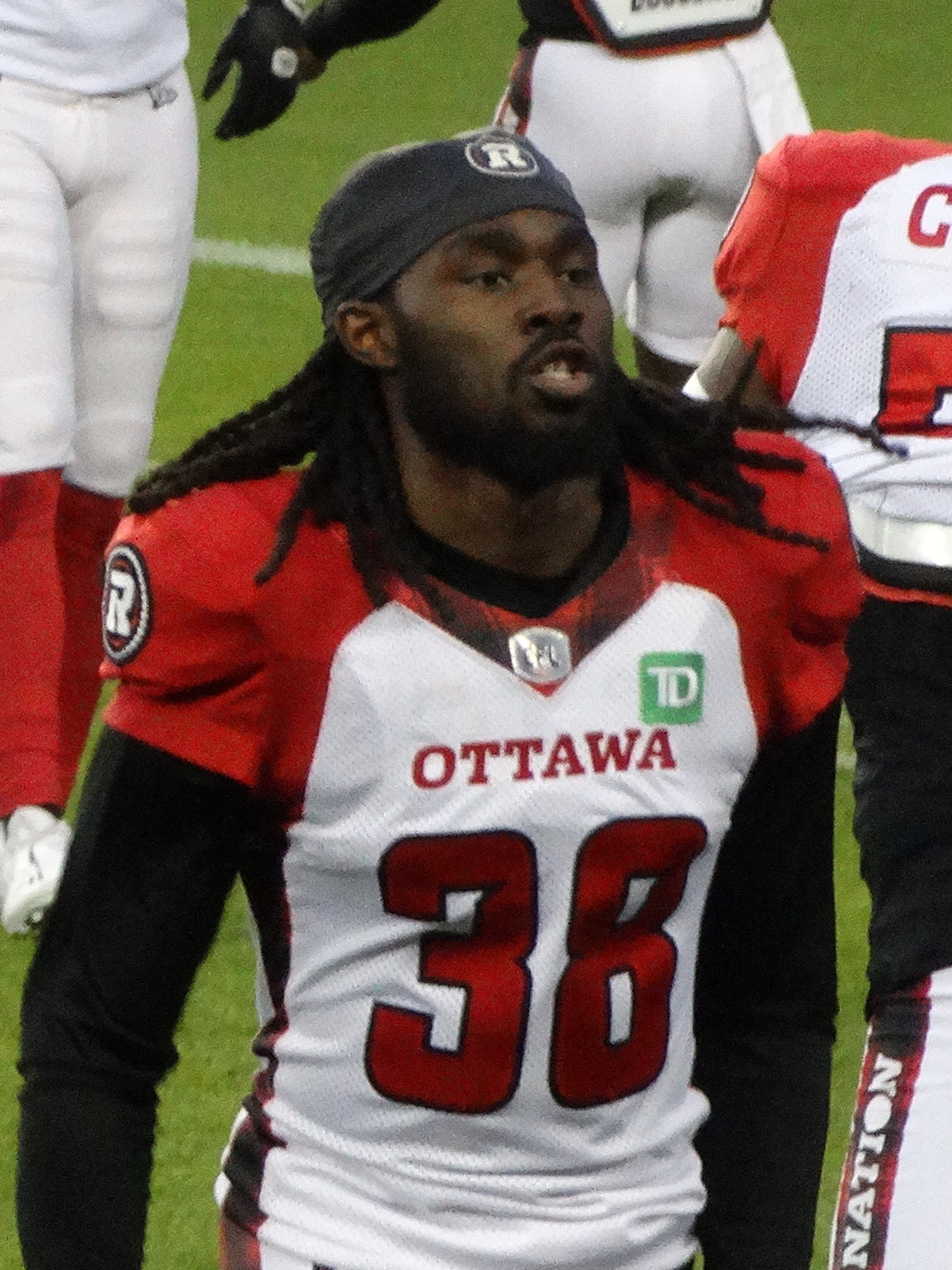
- Lamont with the Ottawa Redblacks in 2023

Profile
- Position: Defensive back

Personal information
- Born: November 12, 1998 (age 27); Baytown, Texas, U.S.
- Listed height: 5 ft 11 in (1.80 m)
- Listed weight: 190 lb (86 kg)

Career information
- High school: Goose Creek (Baytown)
- College: Central Arkansas, Illinois State

Career history
- 2023–2025: Ottawa Redblacks
- 2026*: Winnipeg Blue Bombers

Awards and highlights
- First-team All-ASUN (2021)
- Stats at CFL.ca

Deandre Lamont (born November 12, 1998) is an American professional football defensive back. He played college football at Central Arkansas and Illinois State.

== Early life ==
Lamont played high school football at Goose Creek Memorial High School in Baytown, Texas and was a three-year letterman, spending time at quarterback, wide receiver and defensive back. He also participated in track and field in high school.

== College career ==
=== Central Arkansas ===
Lamont played college football at Central Arkansas from 2018 to 2021. He redshirted in 2017.

Lamont played in four games in 2018, recording three tackles and one fumble recovery. He appeared in 13 games in 2019, totaling 43 tackles and two pass breakups. He played in eight games in the COVID-19 shortened 2020 season, accumulating 39 tackles, two interceptions, one forced fumble and two fumble recoveries. Lamont played in 11 games, all starts, in 2021, recording 63 tackles, two interceptions, eight pass breakups, two fumble recoveries and one blocked kick, earning first team All-ASUN Conference honors.

=== Illinois State ===
Lamont transferred to play for the Illinois State in 2022. He played in 11 games during his lone season at Illinois State, totaling 68 tackles, two sacks, one interception, and three pass breakups. He was named honorable mention All-Missouri Valley Football Conference (MVFC) in 2022.

== Professional career ==
=== Ottawa Redblacks ===
Lamont was signed by the Ottawa Redblacks of the Canadian Football League (CFL) on April 4, 2023. He was moved between the practice roster, active roster and injured reserve several times during the 2023 season. Overall, he dressed in 11 games, starting nine, for the Redblacks in 2023, recording 25 tackles on defense, one special teams tackle and two interceptions.

In 2024, Lamont played in 18 regular season games where he had 86 defensive tackles, five special teams tackles, and one interception. In the 2025 season, he played in 12 games and had 86 defensive tackles, five special teams tackles, and one interception. He became a free agent upon the expiry of his contract on February 10, 2026.

=== Winnipeg Blue Bombers ===
On February 20, 2026, Lamont signed with the Winnipeg Blue Bombers. He was released on May 30 as part of final roster cuts.
