= Nick Mardner =

Canadian gridiron football player (born 1999)

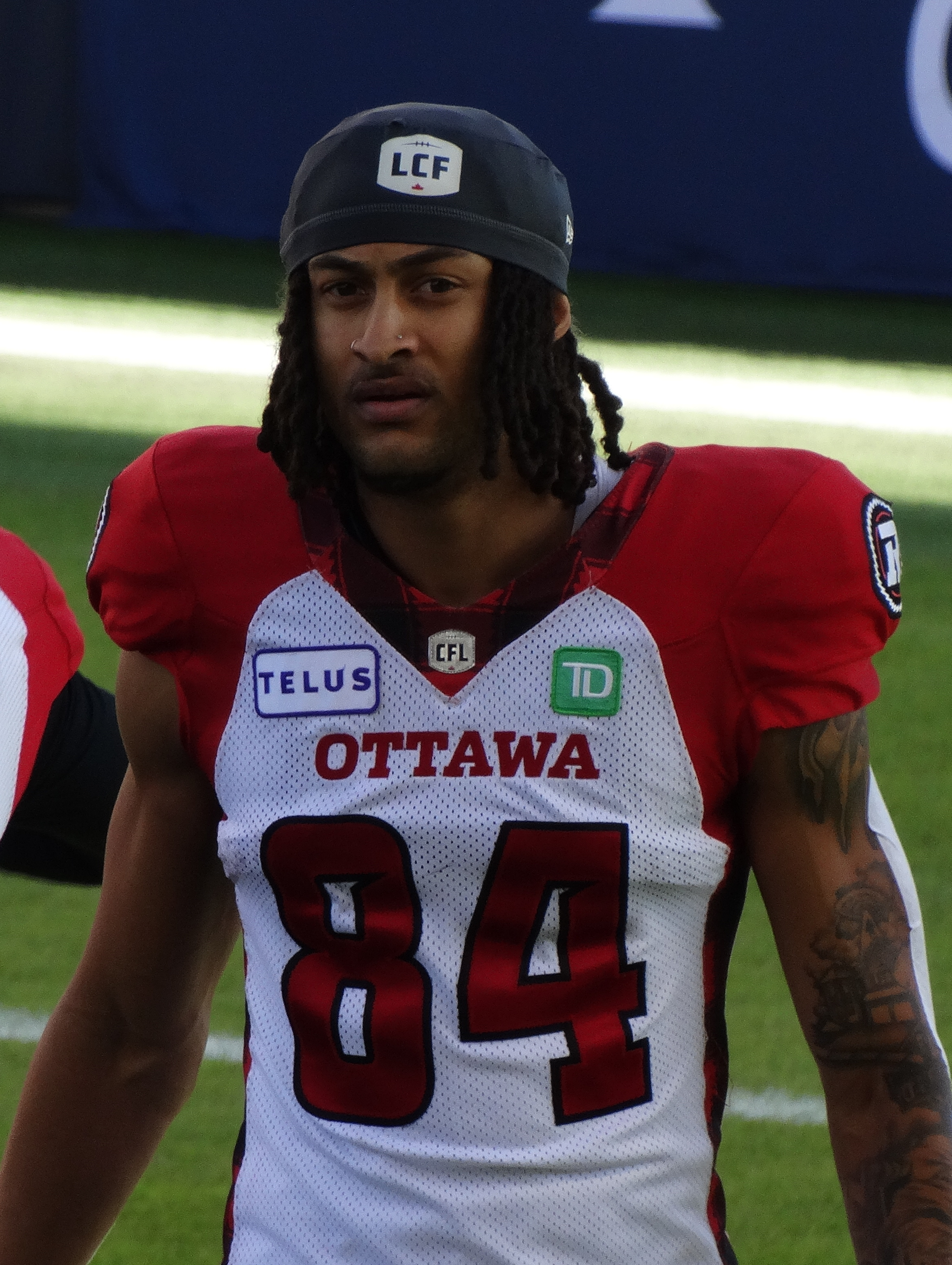
- Mardner with the Ottawa Redblacks in 2024

Profile
- Position: Wide receiver

Personal information
- Born: April 18, 1999 (age 27); Mississauga, Ontario, Canada
- Listed height: 6 ft 6 in (1.98 m)
- Listed weight: 208 lb (94 kg)

Career information
- College: Hawaii (2018–2021); Cincinnati (2022); Auburn (2023)
- CFL draft: 2024: 1st round, 2nd overall pick

Career history
- 2024–2026: Ottawa Redblacks

Career CFL statistics as of 2026
- Receptions: 29
- Receiving yards: 329
- Receiving touchdowns: 3
- Stats at CFL.ca

Nick Mardner (born April 18, 1999) is a Canadian professional football wide receiver. He most recently played for the Ottawa Redblacks of the Canadian Football League (CFL). He played college football at Hawaii, Cincinnati, and Auburn.

== Early life ==
Mardner was born in Mississauga, Ontario. He played high school football at Clarkson Secondary School in Mississauga & at St. Thomas Aquinas Catholic Secondary School in Oakville. He was rated one of the top 10 Canadian prospects in the class of 2018 by allCanadaGridiron.com.

== College career ==
Mardner first college football for the Hawaii Rainbow Warriors from 2018 to 2021. He played in only one game in 2018 and was redshirted. He played in 12 games, starting one, in 2019, catching five passes for 169 yards and two touchdowns. Mardner appeared in eight games, starting two, during the COVID-19 shortened 2020 season, recording 11 receptions for 188 yards and one touchdown. He played in 13 games, starting 10, during the 2021 season, catching 46 catches for 913 yards and five touchdowns.

Mardner transferred to play for the Cincinnati in 2022. He totaled 19 receptions for 218 yards and three touchdowns in five games played.

He transferred to Auburn for his sixth, and final, season of college football in 2023. He appeared in four games for the Tigers but did not catch any passes.

== Professional career ==
Pre-draft measurables
| Height | Weight | Arm length | Hand span | Wingspan | 40-yard dash | 10-yard split | 20-yard split | 20-yard shuttle | Three-cone drill | Vertical jump | Broad jump | Bench press |
|---|---|---|---|---|---|---|---|---|---|---|---|---|
| 6 ft 6 1/8 in (1.98 m) | 208 lb (94 kg) | 32 1/2 in (0.83 m) | 9 3/8 in (0.24 m) | 6 ft 7 3/8 in (2.02 m) | 4.60 s | 1.58 s | 2.64 s | 4.62 s | 7.43 s | 35.0 in (0.89 m) | 10 ft 9 in (3.28 m) | 11 reps |
All values from Pro Day

Mardner was selected by the Ottawa Redblacks of the Canadian Football League (CFL) with the second overall pick in the 2024 CFL draft. He also participated in rookie minicamp on a tryout basis with the New York Giants in May 2024. He officially signed with the Redblacks on May 13, 2024. He played in all 18 regular season games in 2024, starting in 17, where he had 26 receptions for 300 yards and three touchdowns. He made his post-season debut in the East Semi-Final where he had three catches for 24 yards.

Mardner was on the injured list for the entire 2025 season due to a knee injury. In 2026, he played in nine games where he had three catches for 23 yards. With two games remaining in the season, Mardner was released on October 15, 2026.
