= Drew Allemang =

Canadian general manager

Personal information
- Born: Hamilton, Ontario, Canada

Career history
- 2008: Hamilton Tiger-Cats (Assistant Equipment Manager)
- 2009–2010: Hamilton Tiger-Cats (Coordinator of Football Operations)
- 2011–2012: Hamilton Tiger-Cats (Canadian Player Development Coordinator and Head Canadian Scout)
- 2013–2018: Hamilton Tiger-Cats (Director of Canadian Scouting)
- 2016–2018: Hamilton Tiger-Cats (Assistant General Manager)
- 2019–2021: Hamilton Tiger-Cats (Senior Director of Player Personnel and Co-Manager of Football Operations)
- 2022–2024: Hamilton Tiger-Cats (Assistant General Manager and Director of Canadian Scouting)
- 2025–present: Ottawa Redblacks (Senior Personnel Executive)

Drew Allemang is a senior personnel executive for the Ottawa Redblacks of the Canadian Football League (CFL).

== Administrative career ==
Allemang was first hired by the Hamilton Tiger-Cats as the team's Assistant Equipment Manager in 2008 and would also volunteer with the personnel department. He was named the team's Coordinator of Football Operations in 2009 and served in that role for two years. He was then named the team's coordinator of Canadian player development and head Canadian scout in 2011. On March 8, 2013, he was named the director of Canadian scouting. Allemang was promoted to assistant general manager on March 11, 2016, while continuing to serve as the director of Canadian scouting. After three years in the assistant GM role, he was named senior director of personnel and co-manager of football operations, along with Shawn Burke, on January 3, 2019, effectively making the pair the team's co-general managers. After Burke left the Tiger-Cats, the team re-organized their front office structure and Allemang was named the assistant general manager and director of Canadian scouting on December 24, 2021. He remained in that capacity for three seasons.

On May 13, 2025, it was announced that Allemang had joined the Ottawa Redblacks as a senior personnel executive.

== Personal life ==
Allemang's father, Marv, played in the CFL for 14 years, including seven years with the Hamilton Tiger-Cats where he won the 74th Grey Cup. Allemang's uncle, Kent Carter, played for the Tiger-Cats from 1976 to 1978. He has one sister, Andrea, and one brother, Matt, who also works for the Tiger-Cats.
