= Jayden Griffiths =

Canadian gridiron football player (born 2002

Profile
- Position: Linebacker

Personal information
- Born: July 24, 2002 (age 24); Mississauga, Ontario, Canada
- Listed height: 6 ft 0 in (1.83 m)
- Listed weight: 223 lb (101 kg)

Career information
- University: Wilfrid Laurier
- CFL draft: 2025: 7th round, 60th overall pick

Career history
- Ottawa Redblacks (2025); Hamilton Tiger-Cats (2026)
- Stats at CFL.ca

Jayden Griffiths (born July 24, 2002) is a Canadian professional football linebacker.

== University career ==
Griffiths played U Sports football for the Wilfrid Laurier Golden Hawks, recording 62 tackles, 1.5 sacks, six deflected passes, and a fumble recovery his final two seasons.

== Professional career ==
=== Ottawa Redblacks ===
Griffiths was drafted by the Ottawa Redblacks with the 60th overall pick in the 2025 CFL Draft. Following training camp, he made the team's active roster and played in his first professional game on June 5, 2025, against the Saskatchewan Roughriders. He played in all 18 regular season games in 2025 where he had one defensive tackle and five special teams tackles.

On May 13, 2026, Griffiths was released by the Redblacks.

=== Hamilton Tiger-Cats ===
On August 5, 2026, it was announced that Griffiths had signed a practice roster agreement with the Hamilton Tiger-Cats. On October 26, he was released.
