= Bennett Williams =

American gridiron football player (born 1999)

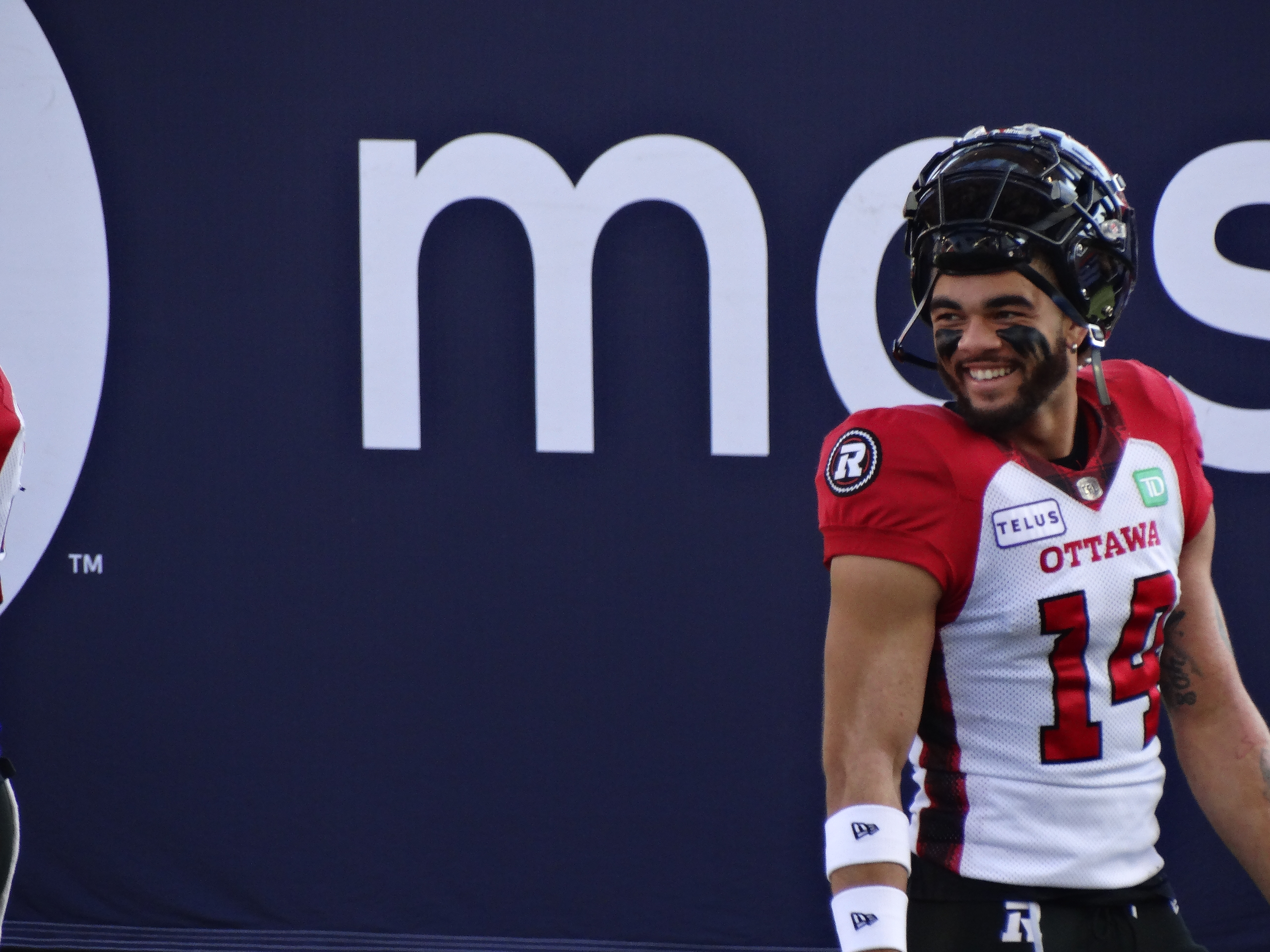
- Williams with the Ottawa Redblacks in 2024

No. 14 – Ottawa Redblacks
- Position: Defensive back

Personal information
- Born: February 26, 1999 (age 27)
- Listed height: 6 ft 0 in (1.83 m)
- Listed weight: 206 lb (93 kg)

Career information
- High school: St. Francis (Mountain View, California)
- College: Illinois (2017); San Mateo (2018–2019); Oregon (2020–2022)
- NFL draft: 2023: undrafted

Career history
- Miami Dolphins (2023)*; Ottawa Redblacks (2024–present)
- * Offseason or practice squad member only

Bennett Williams (born February 26, 1999) is an American professional football defensive back for the Ottawa Redblacks of the Canadian Football League (CFL). He played college football at Illinois, San Mateo, and Oregon.

== Early life ==
Williams was born on February 26, 1999. Williams attended St. Francis High School in Mountain View, California where he played as a wide receiver and cornerback. On offense brought in 40 receptions, for 824 yards, and eight touchdowns. On defense he made 166 tackles, with seven going for a loss, 46 pass defelections, 17 interceptions, and three forced fumbles. On January 31, 2017, Williams would decide to commit to Illinois to play college football over other school such as Air Force, Columbia, Harvard, Hawaii, San Jose State, Yale, and UNLV. He is the brother of NFL safety Evan Williams, a fourth round draft pick of the Green Bay Packers in 2024.

== College career ==
=== Illinois ===
In Williams's first season with Illinois he put up 64 tackles, 1.5 going for a loss, three interceptions, two pass deflections, and a forced fumble. For his stellar freshman performance he was named to the Freshman All-American team. To begain Williams's sophomore year he was suspended for the first three games of the season. After one year with Illinois, he was dismissed from the team after a violation of team rules.

=== San Mateo ===
After being dismissed from Illinois, Williams would transfer to the College of San Mateo to continue playing football. In his time with San Mateo, Williams was named a Junior College All American, while also being named first-team All-Bay and earning all-conference honors. Williams would also help lead San Mateo to its first state title.

=== Oregon ===
After one year at San Mateo, Williams transferred to Oregon in 2020. In his first season with Oregon he played in six games, making 15 tackles, including two tackles for a loss, a sack, and two pass deflections.

On September 25, 2021, Williams had his breakout game notching two interceptions, including returning one for a 68-yard touchdown, to help the #3 Ducks, beat Arizona 41–19. For his performance in his breakout game he was named the Walter Camp Defensive Player of the Week. However just over a week later, Williams would suffer a broken fibula which would cause him to miss the rest of the regular season. Williams would however be cleared to play in the team's bowl game. Williams would finish his shortend year 20 tackles, with one going for a loss, three interceptions, and a touchdown, in five games.

On November 21, 2022, Williams had one of the best games of his career after racking up 14 tackles, and two interceptions, to help the Ducks upset #10 Utah and help the Ducks keep their chance of reaching the College Football Playoff alive. Williams would finish the season playing in 13 games, while making 72 tackles, with 1.5 being for a loss, a sack, two interceptions, six pass deflections, and two forced fumbles.

== Professional career ==
Pre-draft measurables
Height	Weight	Arm length	Hand span	Wingspan	40-yard dash	10-yard split	20-yard split	20-yard shuttle	Three-cone drill	Vertical jump	Broad jump	Bench press
6 ft 0 in (1.83 m)	206 lb (93 kg)	31 1/8 in (0.79 m)	10 3/8 in (0.26 m)	6 ft 3 1/2 in (1.92 m)	4.68 s	1.59 s	2.65 s	4.25 s	7.03 s	34.0 in (0.86 m)	10 ft 2 in (3.10 m)	16 reps
All values from Pro Day

=== Miami Dolphins ===
After going unselected in the 2023 NFL draft, Williams signed with the Miami Dolphins as an undrafted free agent. He was waived on August 2, 2023.

=== Ottawa Redblacks ===
Williams signed with the Ottawa Redblacks on March 11, 2024. In the 2024 season, he played in 11 regular season games, starting in six, where he had 27 defensive tackles, two special teams tackles, two pass knockdowns, and one sack.
