= Tyron Vrede =

Dutch gridiron football player (born 1996)

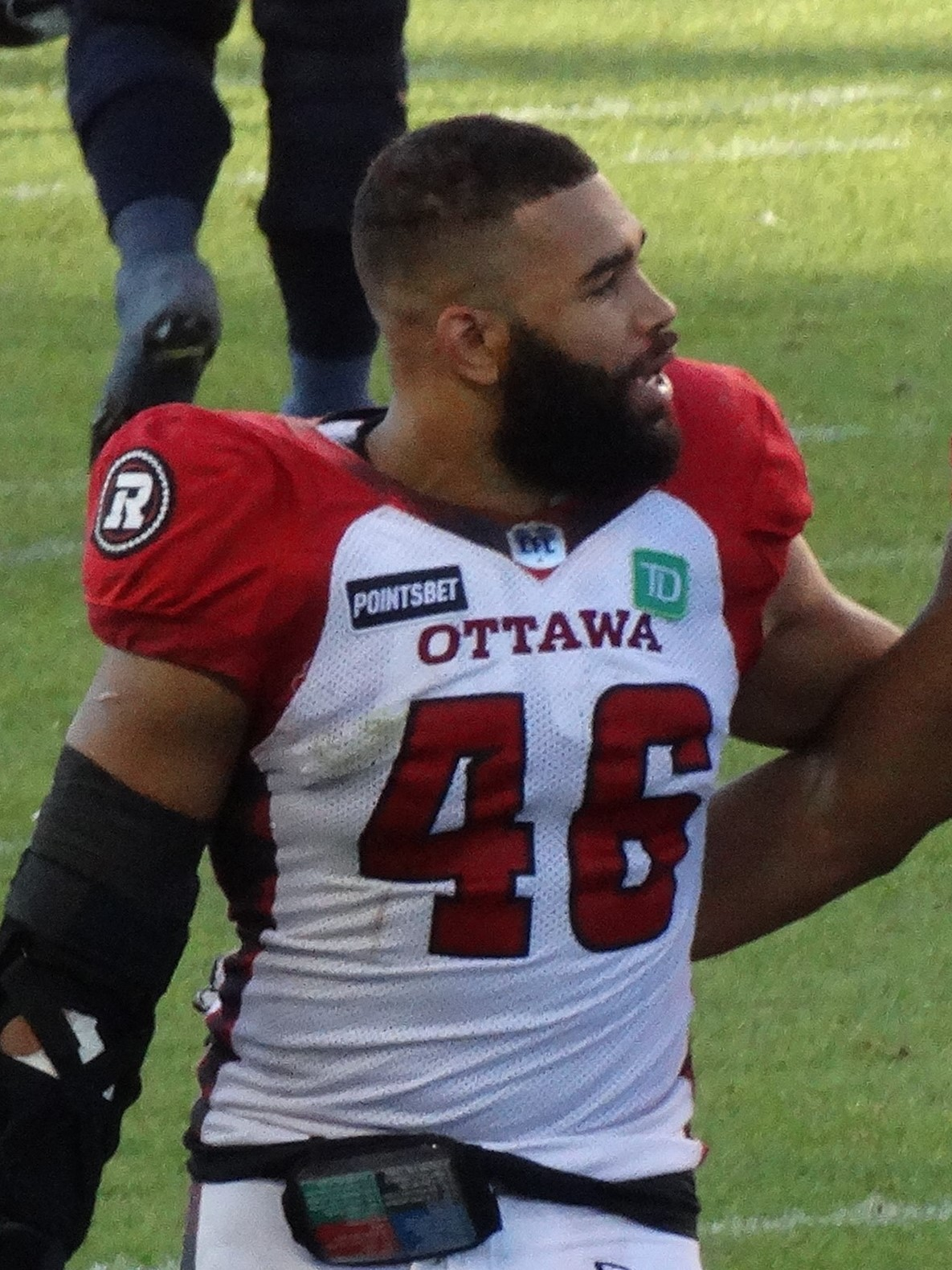
- Vrede with the Ottawa Redblacks in 2022

No. 54 – Edmonton Elks
- Position: Linebacker
- Roster status: Active
- CFL status: Global

Personal information
- Born: 18 September 1996 (age 30); Amsterdam, Netherlands
- Listed height: 6 ft 0 in (1.83 m)
- Listed weight: 230 lb (104 kg)

Career information
- College: West Hills Coalinga (2016); Garden City CC (2017); North Dakota (2018–2019)
- CFL draft: 2021G: 2nd round, 10th overall pick

Career history
- –2016: Amsterdam Crusaders
- 2021–2025: Ottawa Redblacks
- 2026: Saskatchewan Roughriders
- 2026-Present: Edmonton Elks

Awards and highlights
- Grey Cup champion (2026)
- Stats at CFL.ca

Tyron Vrede (born 18 September 1996) is a Dutch professional gridiron football linebacker for the Edmonton Elks of the Canadian Football League (CFL). He was the tenth overall pick by the Redblacks in the 2021 CFL global draft.

== Early life ==
Vrede grew up playing association football in his hometown of Amsterdam, describing himself as a physical player, but got interested in American football after he was gifted a copy of the video game Madden 2000 for the PlayStation. Since the Netherlands does not allow kids to play tackle football until they are 17, he played flag football for a few months before he could join a full-contact team. However, with no exposure to international recruiters, Vrede did not receive any offers to play college football after graduating from high school. Over the next two years, he carried luggage at an Amsterdam airport, coached flag football, and managed a gym to make enough money for a potential move to the United States.

Vrede played with the Amsterdam Crusaders in his hometown, even serving as the team's placekicker. He played in the EFL Bowl in 2016, which they lost to the Frankfurt Universe. Vrede was also called up to the Dutch junior national teams on several occasions. He was eventually selected to play in the International Bowl at AT&T Stadium in Arlington, Texas, representing Team World against Team USA under-19s. "That's when I knew I could play at an American level," Vrede said of the experience. He began sending his highlight film to American junior colleges and attended football camps in Germany to attract attention from coaches.

== College career ==
Vrede enrolled at West Hills College Coalinga with the help of fellow Amsterdam native Dylan Bakker, who had played at West Hills and North Dakota. As a freshman, Vrede recorded 36 tackles and five pass breakups in nine games at defensive back. He also helped the Falcons upset an unbeaten Shasta College team in the 2016 NCFC American Division Bowl, tallying nine tackles in the 20–14 comeback victory. However, the coaching staff was fired in the offseason, leading Vrede to transfer to Garden City Community College in Garden City, Kansas. Now listed as a linebacker, he recorded 28 tackles, two sacks, and a forced fumble in his lone season with the Broncbusters. His performance helped him land a scholarship to play NCAA Division I football at the University of North Dakota.

Vrede played in all 11 games for the Fighting Hawks during his junior year in 2018, logging 23 tackles, six tackles for loss and two sacks as a reserve linebacker. Because of differences between the Dutch and American education systems, he was originally labelled a senior throughout the season by the NCAA and was not cleared to play his actual senior year until spring break. In 2019, Vrede played in all 12 games and recorded 33 tackles, four tackles for loss and 1.5 sacks. He tallied five tackles in their season opening win against Drake.

Vrede graduated summa cum laude with a bachelor's degree in business administration in 2020.

== Professional career ==
=== Ottawa Redblacks ===
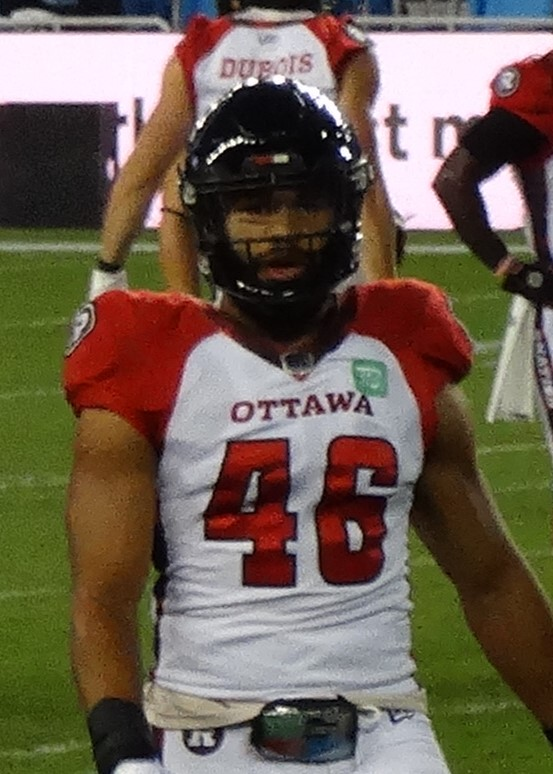
Vrede in 2021

Vrede was selected by the Ottawa Redblacks with the tenth overall pick in the 2021 CFL global draft. Before the draft, JC Abbott of 3DownNation.com had rated him as the second-best linebacker available after Les Maruo. Vrede signed with the Redblacks in late April, and officially made the roster after final cuts were announced a week before the start of the 2021 season. He recorded four special teams tackles in his first four games and finished the year third on the team with ten special teams tackles in 14 games played. He also broke into the defensive rotation towards the end of the season, where he recorded five defensive tackles.

In 2022, Vrede played in 12 regular season games where he recorded seven special teams tackles. At the start of the 2023 season, he played in the first four games where he had 18 defensive tackles, including a career-high 11 defensive tackles on July 8, 2023, against the Hamilton Tiger-Cats. He also recorded two special teams tackles in those games, but suffered a season-ending injury and was out for the remainder of the year.

In 2024, Vrede played in 10 regular season games where he had 16 defensive tackles, three special teams tackles, and one sack. He also played in the team's East Semi-Final loss to the Toronto Argonauts where he recorded two special teams tackles. After becoming a free agent in the following offseason, Vrede re-signed with the Redblacks to a one-year contract. He became a free agent upon the expiry of his contract on February 10, 2026.

=== Saskatchewan Roughriders ===
On February 10, 2026, it was announced that Vrede had signed with the Saskatchewan Roughriders. On July 2, he was released.

=== Edmonton Elks ===
On July 3, 2026, Vrede signed with the Edmonton Elks practice roster.
