= Justin Howell =

Canadian gridiron football player (born 1993)

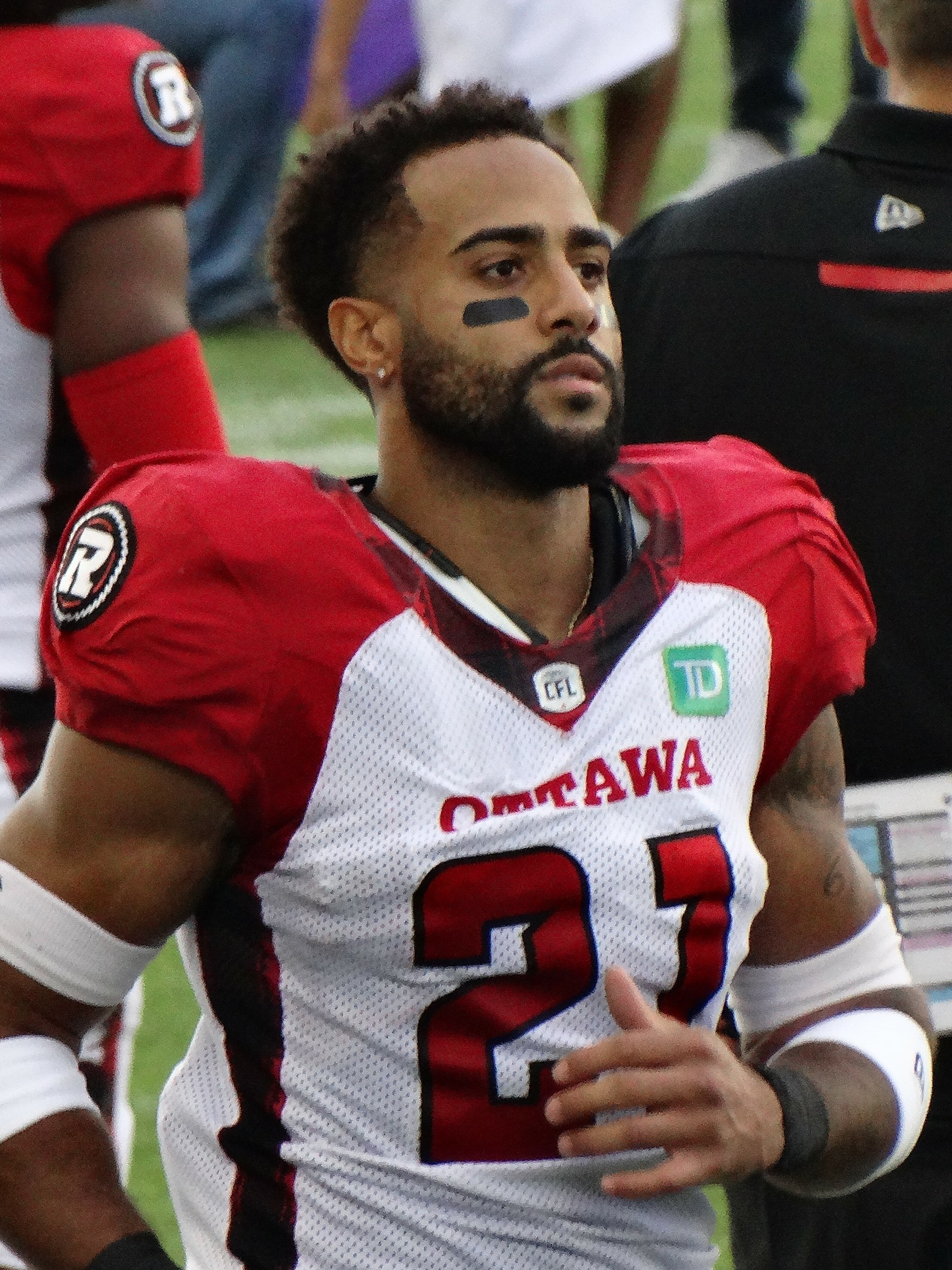
- Howell with the Ottawa Redblacks in 2023

Profile
- Position: Defensive back

Personal information
- Born: December 4, 1993 (age 32); Bradford, Ontario, Canada
- Listed height: 5 ft 11 in (1.80 m)
- Listed weight: 198 lb (90 kg)

Career information
- High school: Bradford
- University: Carleton
- CFL draft: 2018: 7th round, 55th overall pick

Career history
- 2018–2025: Ottawa Redblacks
- 2026–present: Rhein Fire
- Stats at CFL.ca

Justin Howell (born December 4, 1993) is a Canadian professional gridiron football defensive back for the Rhein Fire of the American Football League Europe (AFLE). He previously played for the Ottawa Redblacks of the Canadian Football League (CFL). He played U Sports football for the Carleton Ravens.

== Amateur career ==
Howell first began his interest in football in grade 10 while attending Bradford District High School. He then played for the Carleton Ravens from 2014 to 2017.

== Professional career ==
Pre-draft measurables
Height	Weight	40-yard dash	20-yard shuttle	Three-cone drill	Vertical jump	Broad jump	Bench press
5 ft 10 1/2 in (1.79 m)	198 lb (90 kg)	4.69 s	4.37 s	7.26 s	34.0 in (0.86 m)	9 ft 6 1/2 in (2.91 m)	18 reps
All values from CFL Combine

=== Ottawa Redblacks ===
Howell was drafted by the Ottawa Redblacks with the 55th overall selection, in the seventh round, of the 2018 CFL draft and signed with the team on May 16, 2018. He made the team following training camp and played in his first professional game on June 22, 2018, against the Saskatchewan Roughriders in the 2018 season opening game. He earned his first start at safety on August 11, 2018, against the Montreal Alouettes. Howell played in 13 regular season games and recorded seven defensive tackles and eight special teams tackles while missing five games due to injury. He then played in his first post-season game in the East Final against the Hamilton Tiger-Cats where he recorded a career-high six defensive tackles in a win that sent him to his first Grey Cup game. However, he recorded no stats as the Redblacks lost the 106th Grey Cup to the Calgary Stampeders.

In 2019, Howell played in 14 regular season games and had 14 defensive tackles and eight special teams tackles. He also recorded his first career quarterback sack on September 7, 2019, against the Toronto Argonauts. He signed a one-year contract extension with the Redblacks on January 14, 2020, but with the 2020 CFL season cancelled, it was announced on December 18, 2020, that he had signed another one-year extension with the team.

Howell played in 13 games in 2021 and recorded 25 defensive tackles, nine special teams tackles, and two forced fumbles. In 2022, he spent most of the season on the injured list and played in just five games, recording 14 defensive tackles, two special teams tackles, and two forced fumbles. In the 2023 season, he played and started in 13 games, where he had a career-high 39 defensive tackles and one forced fumble.

In 2024, Howell played in 13 games in a backup capacity where he had seven defensive tackles and four special teams tackles. He was again injured for much of the 2025 season and played in six games where he recorded eight defensive tackles. He became a free agent upon the expiry of his contract on February 10, 2026.

=== Rhein Fire ===
Howell signed with the Rhein Fire of the American Football League Europe (AFLE) ahead of the inaugural 2026 AFLE season.
