= Alonzo Addae =

Canadian gridiron football player (born 1997)

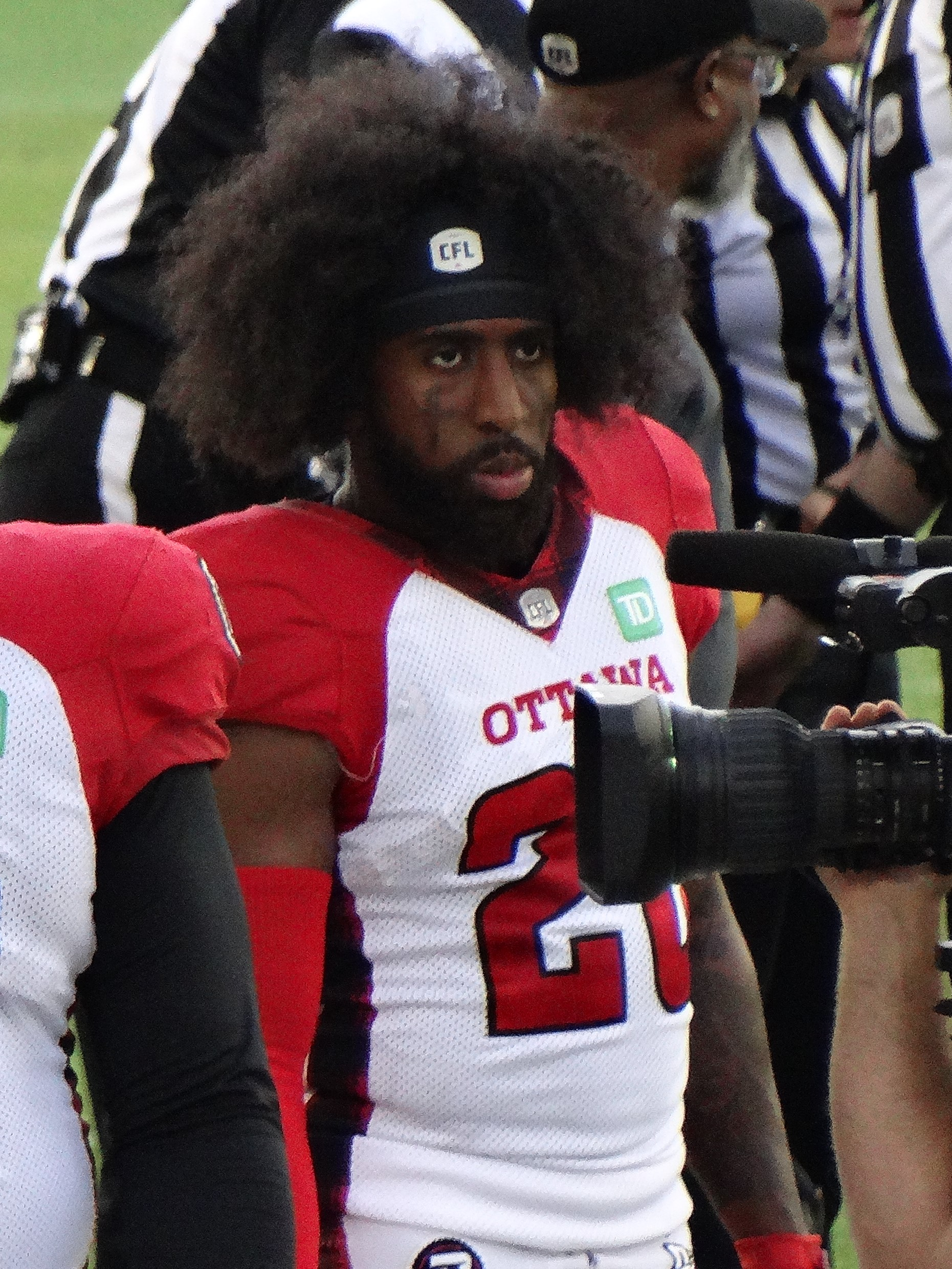
- Addae with the Ottawa Redblacks in 2023

No. 20 – Ottawa Redblacks
- Position: Defensive back
- Roster status: Active
- CFL status: National

Personal information
- Born: July 11, 1997 (age 29); Pickering, Ontario, Canada
- Listed height: 5 ft 10 in (1.78 m)
- Listed weight: 192 lb (87 kg)

Career information
- High school: St. Mary Catholic Secondary
- College: West Virginia; New Hampshire
- CFL draft: 2021: 2nd round, 13th overall pick

Career history
- 2022–present: Ottawa Redblacks

Awards and highlights
- CFL East All-Star (2026)
- Stats at CFL.ca

Alonzo Addae (born July 11, 1997) is a Canadian professional football defensive back for the Ottawa Redblacks of the Canadian Football League (CFL).

== College career ==
After using a redshirt season in 2016, Addae first played college football for the New Hampshire Wildcats from 2017 to 2018.

Addae then transferred to the West Virginia University in 2019 to play for the Mountaineers, but sat out for the season due to transfer eligibility requirements. He played in the next two seasons for the team where he started in 23 games and recorded 139 total tackles, two interceptions, one sack, one forced fumble, and one fumble recovery.

== Professional career ==
Pre-draft measurables
Height	Weight	Arm length	Hand span	Wingspan	40-yard dash	10-yard split	20-yard split	20-yard shuttle	Three-cone drill	Vertical jump	Broad jump	Bench press
5 ft 10 3/8 in (1.79 m)	184 lb (83 kg)	30 in (0.76 m)	9 1/8 in (0.23 m)	5 ft 10 1/2 in (1.79 m)	4.60 s	1.61 s	2.65 s	4.25 s	7.08 s	34.0 in (0.86 m)	9 ft 8 in (2.95 m)	8 reps
All values from Pro Day

Addae was drafted in the second round, 13th overall, by the Ottawa Redblacks in the 2021 CFL draft. However, he did not play for the team in 2021 as he returned to school to complete his college eligibility. He then signed with the Redblacks on May 25, 2022. Following training camp in 2022, he made the team's active roster and played in his first game on June 10, 2022, against the Winnipeg Blue Bombers. In the following week, also against the Blue Bombers, he made his first career start, replacing an injured Justin Howell, where he recorded two defensive tackles. He played in all 18 regular season games, starting in 12, where he had 28 defensive tackles, and one special teams tackle.

In 2023, he again played in 18 games and recorded 24 defensive tackles, eight special teams tackles, four interceptions, and two forced fumbles.

In January 2025, Addae was signed to a two-year deal with the Redblacks.

== Personal life ==
Addae was born to parents Les Addae and Renée Bethea and he has two brothers. His grandfather, Willie Bethea, played at running back for the Hamilton Tiger-Cats and won three Grey Cup championships. Addae's cousin, Jahleel Addae, played defensive back in the National Football League and his other cousin, Jahmile Addae, also played defensive back and coached him while at West Virginia.
