= Parker Moorer =

American football player

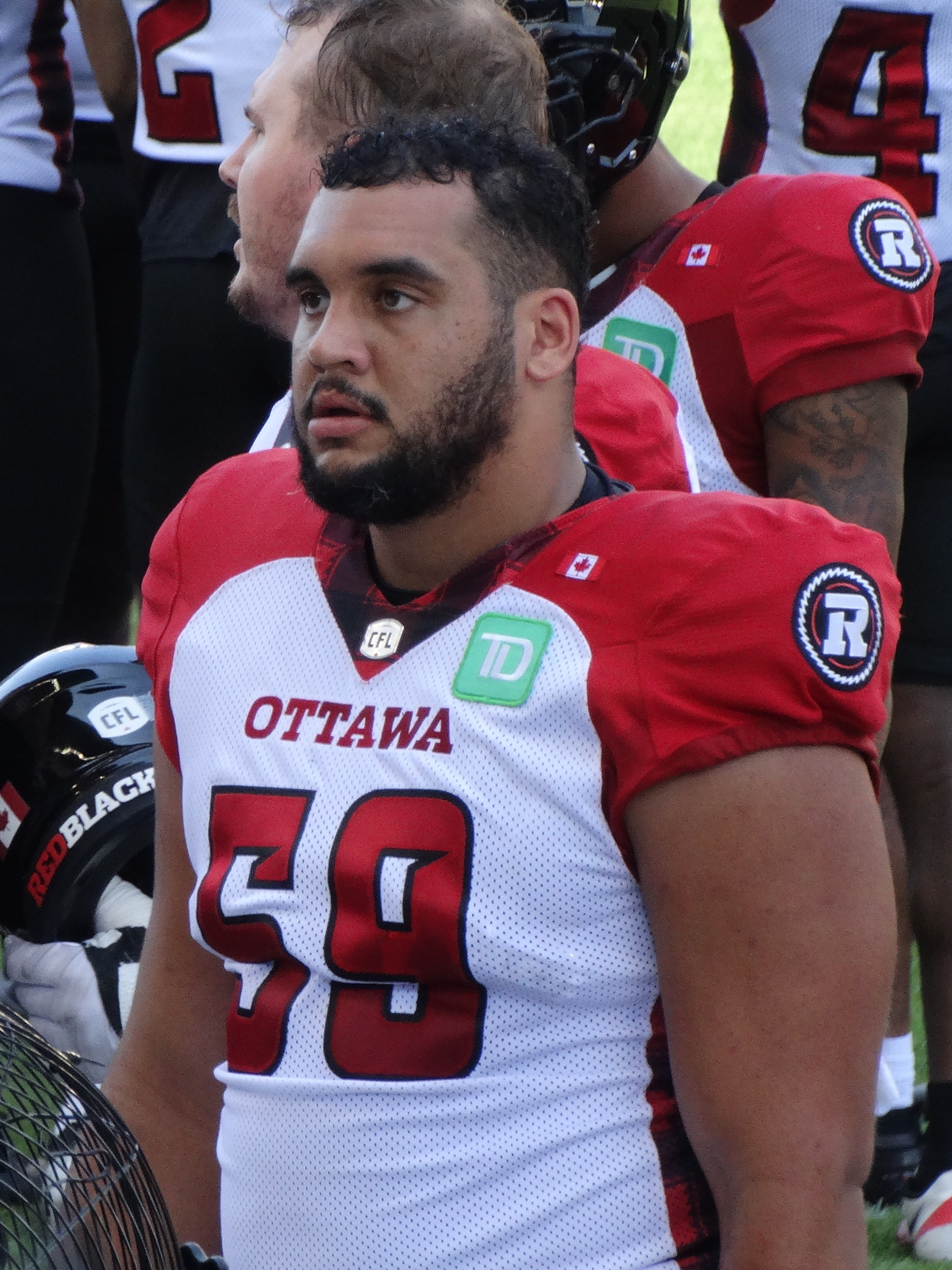
- Moorer with the Ottawa Redblacks in 2025

No. 59
- Position: Offensive lineman

Personal information
- Born: December 17, 2000 (age 25)
- Listed height: 6 ft 5 in (1.96 m)
- Listed weight: 314 lb (142 kg)

Career information
- High school: Mallard Creek (Charlotte, North Carolina)
- College: West Virginia (2019–2021); East Carolina (2022–2024)
- NFL draft: 2025: undrafted

Career history
- Ottawa Redblacks (2025)

Awards and highlights
- Third-team All-AAC (2024)

Parker Moorer (born December 17, 2000) is an American former professional football offensive lineman who played for the Ottawa Redblacks of the Canadian Football League (CFL). He played college football at West Virginia and East Carolina.

== Early life ==
Parker Moorer was born on December 17, 2000. He played high school football at Mallard Creek High School in Charlotte, North Carolina, as a two-way lineman. He joined the varsity team his sophomore year in 2016. As a junior in 2017, he helped Mallard Creek to a 14–1 record and a runner-up finish in the NCHSAA 4A Football Championship. As a senior in 2018, Moorer earned I-Meck 4A All-Conference honors and was invited to the 82nd Shrine Bowl of the Carolinas. In the class of 2019, he was rated a three-star recruit by ESPN.com, Rivals.com, and 247Sports.com, and the No. 82 offensive tackle in the country by ESPN. Moore was also ranked as the No. 23 player in North Carolina by Rivals, No. 41 by ESPN, and No. 43 by 247Sports.

In April 2018, Moorer committed to play college football for the Maryland Terrapins. However, he rescinded his commitment on August 11, 2018, after the death of Jordan McNair. On September 3, 2018, he committed to West Virginia University over offers from Louisville, Virginia, Indiana, Syracuse, Rutgers, and Marshall, among other schools.

== College career ==
Moorer first played college football for the West Virginia Mountaineers. He was redshirted in 2019, and was named to the Academic All-Big 12 Rookie Team. He played in all ten games as a reserve tackle during the COVID-19 shortened 2020 season, and earned second-team Academic All-Big 12 honors. Moore was the starting right tackle to begin the 2021 season but later lost the job to Wyatt Milum. Moorer appeared in ten games, starting five, overall in 2021 before entering the NCAA transfer portal on November 30, 2021. He majored in sport management at WVU.

In December 2021, Moorer committed to play for the East Carolina Pirates of East Carolina University. He played in 12 games, starting one at right tackle, in 2022. He started all 12 games at left tackle during the 2023 season and led the team with 839 total snaps (793 on offense, 46 on special teams). Moorer started all 13 games at left tackle as a sixth-year senior in 2024 and was named third-team All-AAC.

== Professional career ==
After going undrafted in the 2025 NFL draft, Moore attended rookie minicamp on a tryout basis with the New York Giants. He was signed to the practice roster of the Ottawa Redblacks of the Canadian Football League (CFL) on June 25, 2025. He was promoted to the active roster on July 5, moved back to the practice roster on July 11, promoted to the active roster again on July 19, placed on the one-game injured list on September 16, and placed on the six-game injured list on October 2 Moorer played in eight games, starting seven, overall during the 2025 CFL season as an offensive tackle/guard. He retired on November 19, 2025.

== Personal life ==
Moorer's father played football at Gardner–Webb University.
