= Dawson Pierre =

Canadian football player (born 2000)

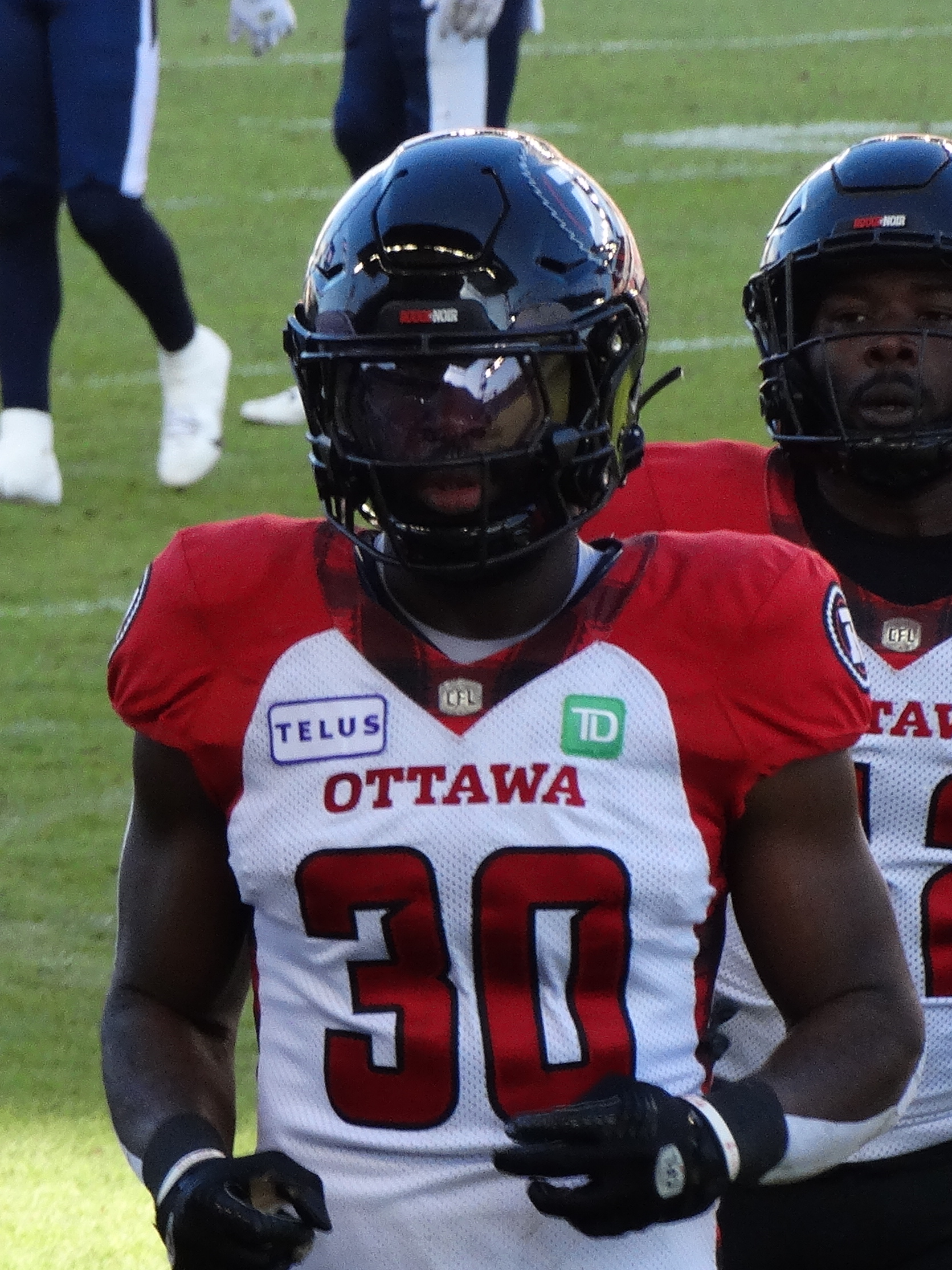
- Pierre with the Ottawa Redblacks in 2024

No. 30 – BC Lions
- Position: Defensive back/Linebacker
- Roster status: Active
- CFL status: National

Personal information
- Born: May 29, 2000 (age 26); Longueuil, Quebec, Canada
- Listed height: 6 ft 2 in (1.88 m)
- Listed weight: 219 lb (99 kg)

Career information
- High school: Redondo Union (Redondo Beach, California)
- University: Concordia (2021–2023)
- CFL draft: 2024: 3rd round, 22nd overall pick

Career history
- Ottawa Redblacks (2024–2025); BC Lions (2026–present)
- Stats at CFL.ca

Dawson Pierre (born May 29, 2000) is a Canadian professional football defensive back/linebacker for the BC Lions of the Canadian Football League (CFL). He played U Sports football at Concordia.

== Early life ==
Dawson Pierre was born on May 29, 2000, in Longueuil, Quebec. He started playing football when he was eight. In 2017, he enrolled at Redondo Union High School in Redondo Beach, California, to play his final few years of high school football at a bigger program. Pierre lived with Redondo Union's quarterback while in the United States. Pierre played wide receiver and defense at Redondo Union, earning all-star honors.

Pierre originally committed to the University of Maine to play college football but had to leave the school due to family issues. He returned to Canada and played CEGEP football at Vanier College.

== University career ==
Pierre briefly attended Carleton University in 2020 but the 2020 U Sports football season was cancelled due to the COVID-19 pandemic.

Pierre played U Sports football for the Concordia Stingers of Concordia University from 2021 to 2023, spending time at defensive halfback and safety. He garnered RSEQ all-star recognition in 2022. He played in six games as a senior in 2023, recording 20 solo tackles, six assisted tackles, one sack, one forced fumble, and one pass breakup. Pierre played in 23 total games during his university career, recording 81 tackles, one sack, one forced fumble, and three interceptions. He studied recreation and leisure at Concordia. After his senior year, he was invited to the FCS Bowl and College Gridiron Showcase all-star games in the United States.

== Professional career ==
=== Pre-draft ===
Pre-draft measurables
Height	Weight	Arm length	Hand span	Wingspan	40-yard dash	10-yard split	20-yard shuttle	Three-cone drill	Vertical jump	Broad jump	Bench press
6 ft 1 7/8 in (1.88 m)	219 lb (99 kg)	32 in (0.81 m)	10 1/8 in (0.26 m)	6 ft 4 in (1.93 m)	4.77 s	1.57 s	4.41 s	7.00 s	34.0 in (0.86 m)	9 ft 10 1/4 in (3.00 m)	17 reps
All values from CFL Combine/Pro Day

In March 2025, Pierre attended the University of Buffalo's pro day. He posted a 4.77 second 40-yard dash, a 1.57 second ten-yard split, a 4.58 second short shuttle, a 7.46 second three-cone drill, a 9'10" broad jump, a 34 inch vertical jump, and 17 bench press reps.

=== Ottawa Redblacks ===
Pierre was selected by the Ottawa Redblacks in the third round, with the 22nd overall pick, of the 2024 CFL draft. He officially signed with the team on May 6, 2024. He was moved to the practice roster on June 1, promoted to the active roster on August 14, moved back to the practice roster on August 20, moved back to the active roster on August 23, moved back to the practice roster again on August 27, promoted to the active roster for the third time on August 29, moved to the practice roster for the fourth time on September 19, promoted to the active roster for the fourth time on September 27, and moved to the one-game injured list on November 1, 2024. Pierre dressed in nine games overall during the 2024 season, totaling four special teams tackles, one forced fumble, and one fumble recovery. He was listed as a linebacker.

The next year, Pierre was moved to the practice roster on July 1, 2025, the active roster on July 5, the practice roster again on July 9, and the active roster again on July 19, 2025. He dressed in six games during the 2025 season and posted one special teams tackle.

=== BC Lions ===
On February 10, 2026, Pierre left the Redblacks as a free agent and signed a two-year contract with the BC Lions. On May 12, 2026, Pierre was released by the Lions, as part of their final round of preseason roster cuts.

On May 28, 2026, Pierre re-signed with the Lions. On May 31, 2026, Pierre was assigned to the Lions' practice roster to start the 2026 CFL season. On July 3, 2026, Pierre was promoted to the Lions' active roster. On July 24, 2026, Pierre was placed on the Lions' 6-game injured list and he remained there to end the 2026 CFL season.

== Personal life ==
Pierre speaks both French and English.
