= Shawn Burke =

Canadian gridiron football executive (born 1981)

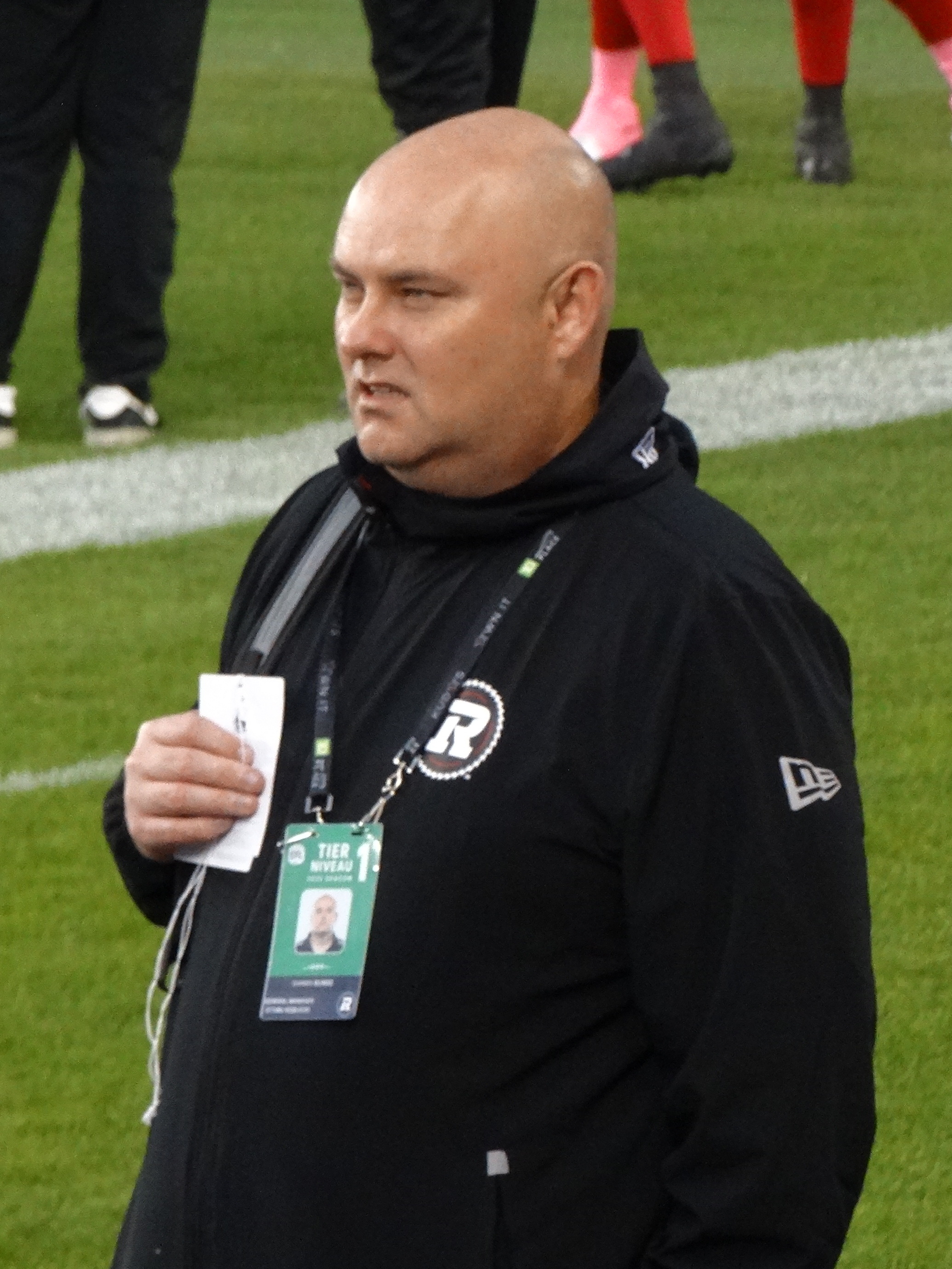
- Burke with the Ottawa Redblacks in 2023

Personal information
- Born: 1981 (age 44–45); Guelph, Ontario, Canada

Career information
- High school: Our Lady of Lourdes
- College: Durham College

Career history
- 2007–2010: Hamilton Tiger-Cats (Director of Community Relations)
- 2009–2010: Hamilton Tiger-Cats (Director of Communications)
- 2011–2015: Hamilton Tiger-Cats (Director of Football Operations)
- 2016–2018: Hamilton Tiger-Cats (Assistant General Manager)
- 2019–2021: Hamilton Tiger-Cats (Senior Director of Player Personnel and Co-Manager of Football Operations)
- 2022–2025: Ottawa Redblacks (General Manager)
- 2026: Ottawa Redblacks (Vice President of Football Operations)

Shawn Burke (born 1981) is a Canadian football administrator who was most recently the vice president of football operations of the Ottawa Redblacks of the Canadian Football League (CFL). He previously spent 15 years in administrative and personnel related positions with the Hamilton Tiger-Cats. Burke is a graduate of the Sports Administration program at Durham College.

== Administrative career ==
=== Hamilton Tiger-Cats ===
Burke was first hired by the Hamilton Tiger-Cats as the team's director of community relations in 2007 and would watch game film with Ron Lancaster. He added the title of director of communications in 2009, serving in both roles for two years. He then moved to the technical side of the franchise as he was named director of football operations in 2011. Burke was promoted to assistant general manager on March 11, 2016, while retaining many of his previous responsibilities. After three years in the assistant GM role, he was named senior director of personnel and co-manager of football operations, along with Drew Allemang, on January 3, 2019, effectively making the pair the team's co-general managers. Under two seasons of Burke in the top personnel position, the Tiger-Cats had a 23–9 record and appeared in two Grey Cup games.

=== Ottawa Redblacks ===
On December 19, 2021, Burke was named the general manager of the Ottawa Redblacks. In his first two years as general manager, the team lost their starting quarterback, Jeremiah Masoli to injury and posted back-to-back 4–14 records. However, after acquiring Dru Brown, the Redblacks finished with a 9–8–1 record in 2024 and the team qualified for the playoffs for the first time during Burke's tenure. The team then regressed in 2025 and again stumbled to a 4–14 finish. On November 5, 2025, it was announced that Ryan Dinwiddie was hired as the team's head coach and general manager with Burke being named vice president of football operations and signing an extension through the 2028 season. However, with the team beginning the 2026 season with ten straight losses and setting the modern record for most consecutive losses (from the end of 2025) with 15, Burke was dismissed by the Redblacks on August 23, 2026.

== Personal life ==
Both of Burke's parents died of lung cancer by the time he was 20 years old. Burke has one brother, Dave Burke Jr.
