= Aidan John =

Canadian gridiron football player (born 2000)

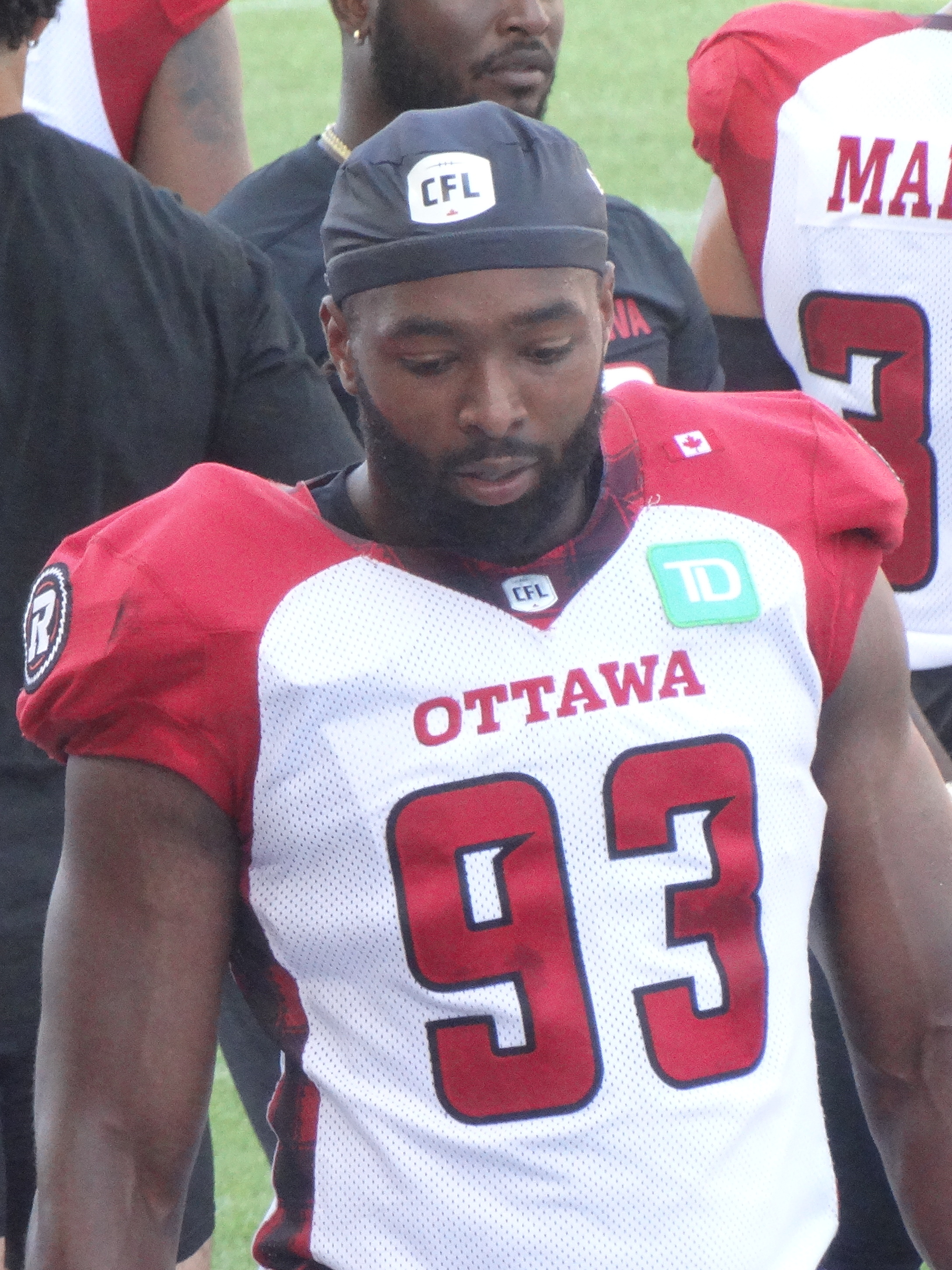
- John with the Ottawa Redblacks in 2025

No. 93 – Ottawa Redblacks
- Position: Defensive lineman
- Roster status: Active
- CFL status: National

Personal information
- Born: July 1, 2000 (age 26); Halifax, Nova Scotia, Canada
- Listed height: 6 ft 3 in (1.91 m)
- Listed weight: 248 lb (112 kg)

Career information
- High school: Citadel High
- University: Saint Mary's; Western
- CFL draft: 2023: 3rd round, 19th overall pick

Career history
- 2023–present: Ottawa Redblacks
- Stats at CFL.ca

Aidan John (born July 1, 2000) is a Canadian professional football defensive lineman for the Ottawa Redblacks of the Canadian Football League (CFL).

== Early life ==
John grew up in Halifax, Nova Scotia and started playing high school football in grade 11 at Citadel High School. He played for Team Nova Scotia at the 2017 Football Canada Cup in Wolfville and he also played for Team Canada in the U18 International Bowl in 2017, where he was named Defensive Player of the Game.

== University career ==
John first committed to playing U Sports football for the Western Mustangs in 2018. However, he had to return to Halifax and instead transferred to play for the Saint Mary's Huskies. He did not play in 2020 due to the cancellation of the 2020 U Sports football season and also sat out the 2021 season. He returned to play in 2022 where he played in seven games and recorded 29 total tackles, four tackles for loss, and one forced fumble. For his career, he played in just 15 games, but had 75.5 tackles, 12 tackles for loss, 5.5 sacks, two pass knockdowns, one forced fumble, and one fumble recovery.

== Professional career ==
Pre-draft measurables
Height	Weight	40-yard dash	20-yard shuttle	Three-cone drill	Vertical jump	Broad jump	Bench press
6 ft 3 1/2 in (1.92 m)	248 lb (112 kg)	4.85 s	4.63 s	7.50 s	35.0 in (0.89 m)	9 ft 8 in (2.95 m)	15 reps
All values from CFL Combine

John was selected by the Ottawa Redblacks of the Canadian Football League (CFL) in the third round, with the 19th overall pick, of the 2023 CFL draft and signed with the team on May 9, 2023. Following training camp in 2023, he accepted a practice roster role with the team. He later made his professional debut on July 23, 2024, against the Calgary Stampeders, where he recorded one defensive tackle. John played in five games in his rookie year where he had three defensive tackles and one special teams tackle.

In 2024, John made the opening day active roster. He later had his first career sack on September 7, 2024, against the Toronto Argonauts. He played in all 18 regular season games where he had 17 defensive tackles, five special teams tackles, and four sacks.
