= Dino Boyd =

American gridiron football player (born 1996)

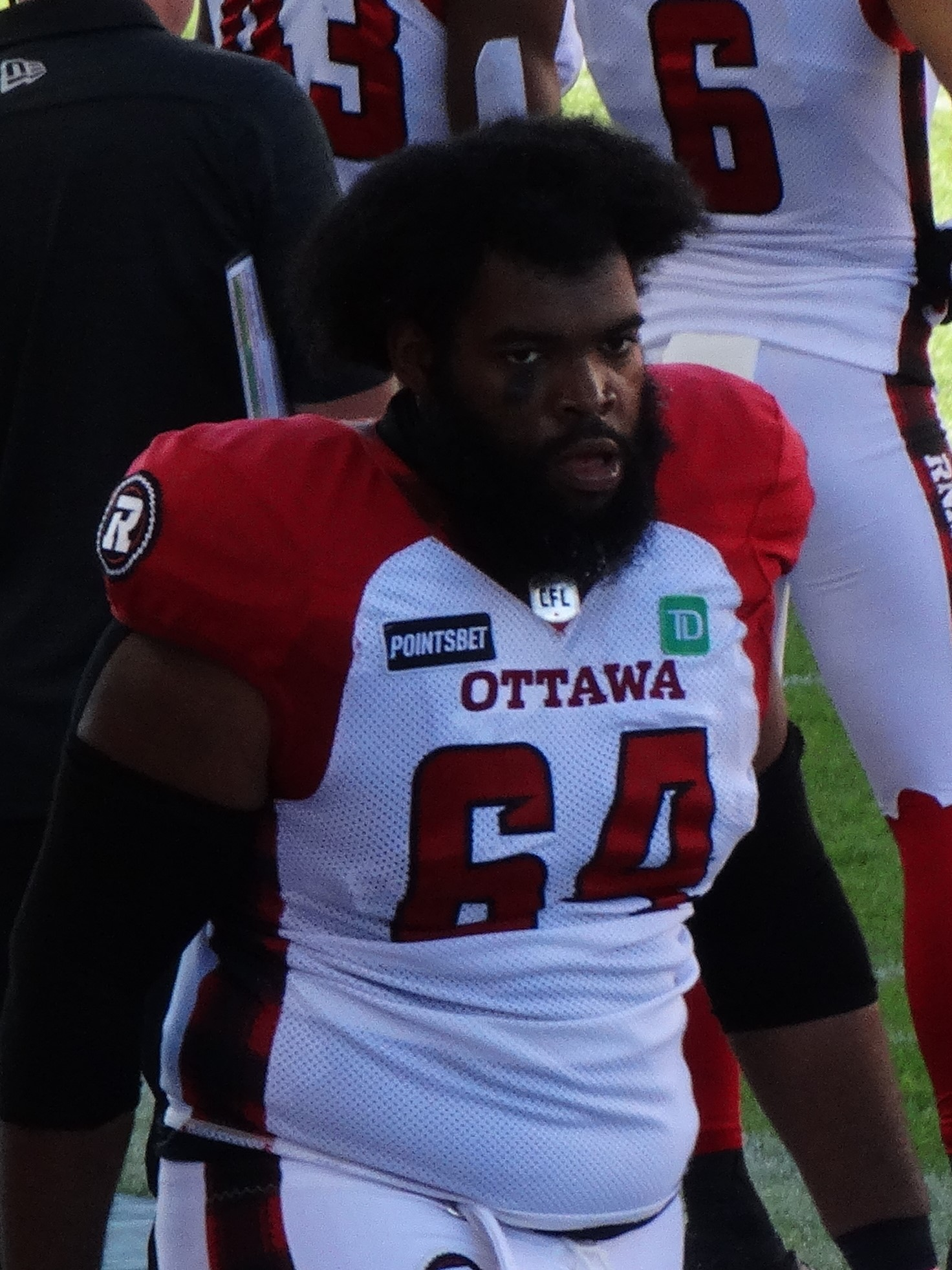
- Boyd with the Ottawa Redblacks in 2022

No. 64 – Ottawa Redblacks
- Position: Offensive lineman
- Roster status: Active
- CFL status: American

Personal information
- Born: September 2, 1996 (age 30); Newark, New Jersey, U.S.
- Listed height: 6 ft 4 in (1.93 m)
- Listed weight: 300 lb (136 kg)

Career information
- High school: West Side High (NJ)
- College: Cincinnati
- NFL draft: 2019: undrafted

Career history
- Kansas City Chiefs (2019)*; Cincinnati Bengals (2019)*; Chicago Bears (2019–2020)*; Winnipeg Blue Bombers (2021)*; Ottawa Redblacks (2021–present)
- * Offseason or practice squad member only

Career CFL statistics as of 2025
- Games played: 66
- Stats at CFL.ca
- Stats at Pro Football Reference

Dino Boyd (born September 2, 1996) is an American professional football offensive lineman for the Ottawa Redblacks of the Canadian Football League (CFL).

== College career ==
Boyd played college football for the Rhode Island Rams from 2014 to 2017. He used a redshirt season in 2015. He transferred to the University of Cincinnati in 2018 to play for the Bearcats where he started all 13 games at left tackle.

== Professional career ==
Pre-draft measurables
Height	Weight	Arm length	Hand span	Wingspan	20-yard shuttle	Three-cone drill	Vertical jump	Broad jump	Bench press
6 ft 3 1/4 in (1.91 m)	302 lb (137 kg)	34 7/8 in (0.89 m)	9 1/2 in (0.24 m)	6 ft 9 in (2.06 m)	4.90 s	7.94 s	27.5 in (0.70 m)	8 ft 6 in (2.59 m)	22 reps
All values from Pro Day

=== Kansas City Chiefs ===
Boyd signed as an undrafted free agent with the Kansas City Chiefs on May 4, 2019. However, he was released at the end of training camp on August 31, 2019.

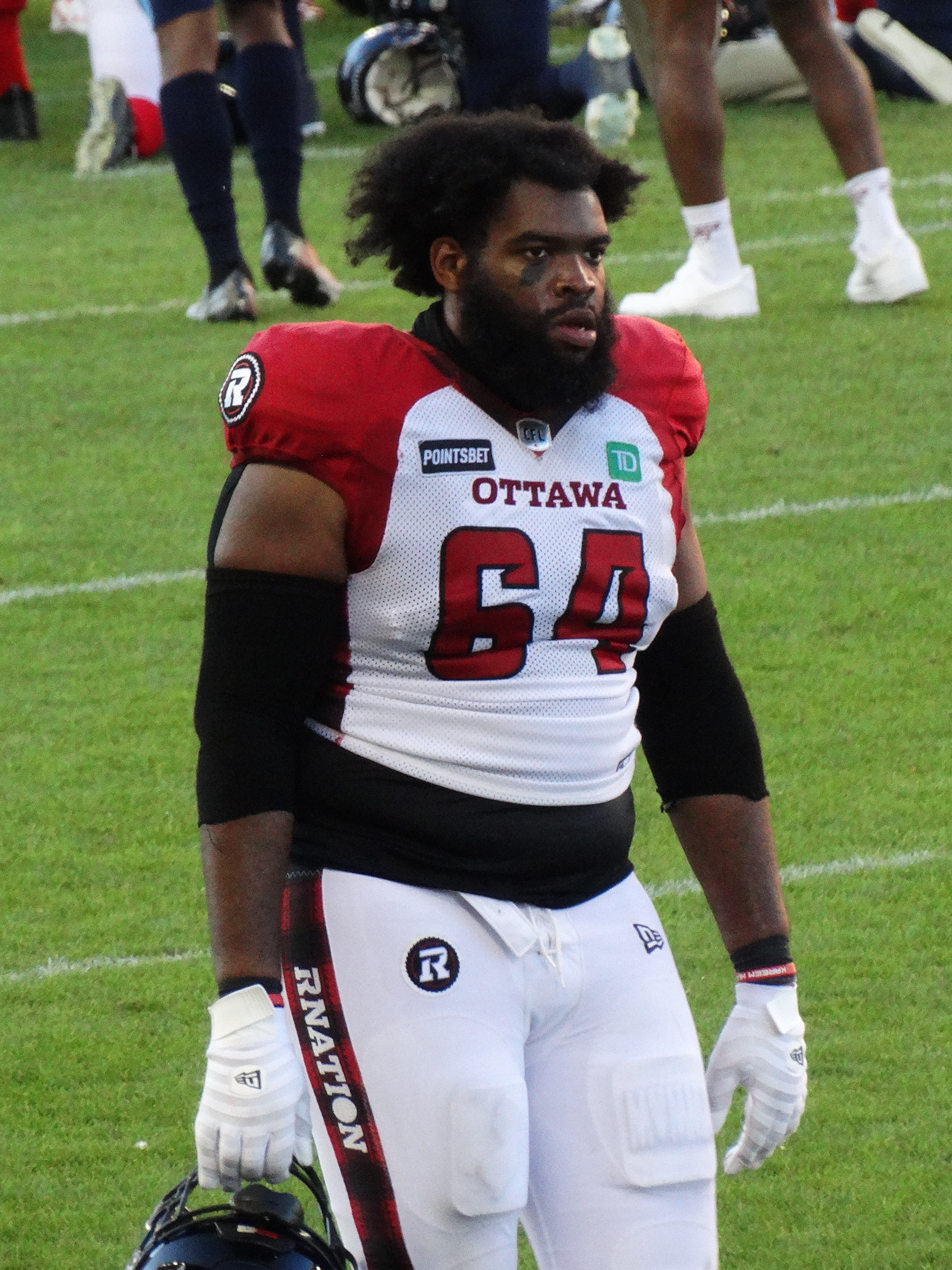
Boyd with the Redblacks in 2022

=== Cincinnati Bengals ===
Boyd signed with the Cincinnati Bengals to a practice roster agreement on September 17, 2019, but was released on October 18, 2019, without having played in a regular season game.

=== Chicago Bears ===
Boyd signed a practice roster agreement with the Chicago Bears and spent the last seven weeks of the 2019 season with the team. He re-signed with the Bears for the 2020 season, but was waived on August 3, 2020.

=== Winnipeg Blue Bombers ===
On June 18, 2021, Boyd signed with the Winnipeg Blue Bombers. However, he was released at the end of training camp on July 26, 2021.

=== Ottawa Redblacks ===
On September 21, 2021, Boyd signed with the Ottawa Redblacks. After clearing COVID protocols, he was placed on the team's practice roster. He played in his first professional game on October 16, 2021, against the Montreal Alouettes. He played in three games in 2021 for the Redblacks.

Following training camp in 2022, Boyd made the team's active roster as their starting right tackle.

== Personal life ==
Boyd was born to parents Dino Sr. and Brisha Boyd.
