= C. J. Coldon Jr. =

American gridiron football player (born 1998)

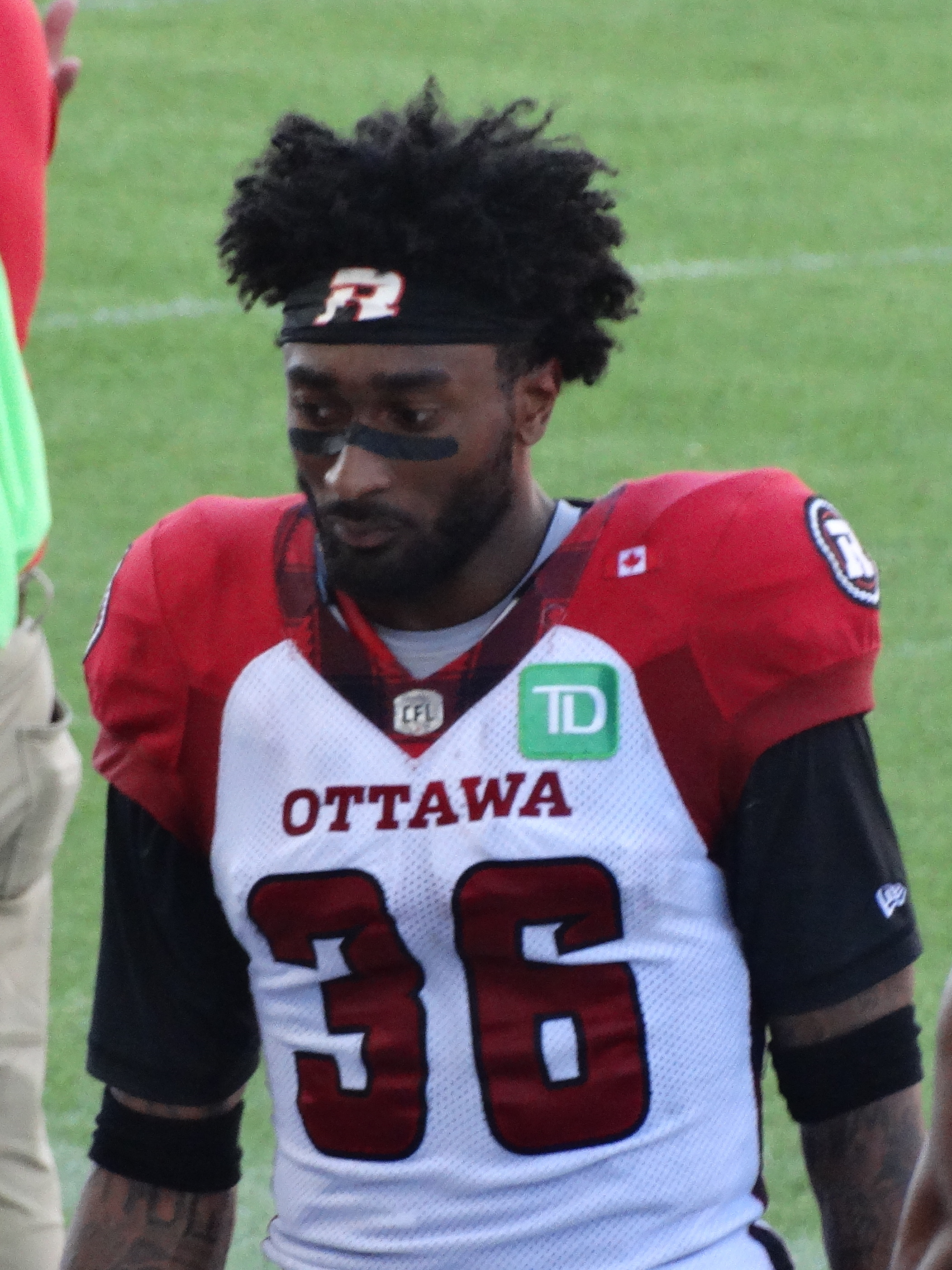
- Coldon Jr. with the Ottawa Redblacks in 2025

No. 3 – BC Lions
- Position: Defensive back
- Roster status: Active
- CFL status: American

Personal information
- Born: September 3, 1998 (age 28); Belleville, Illinois, U.S.
- Listed height: 6 ft 1 in (1.85 m)
- Listed weight: 180 lb (82 kg)

Career information
- High school: Althoff Catholic (Belleville)
- College: Wyoming (2017–2021); Oklahoma (2022)
- NFL draft: 2023: undrafted

Career history
- Minnesota Vikings (2023)*; Saskatchewan Roughriders (2024)*; Massachusetts Pirates (2024); Ottawa Redblacks (2024–2025); BC Lions (2026–present)
- * Offseason or practice squad member only

Awards and highlights
- Second-team All-Mountain West (2021)
- Stats at Pro Football Reference
- Stats at CFL.ca

C. J. Coldon Jr. (born September 3, 1998) is an American professional football defensive back for the BC Lions of the Canadian Football League (CFL). He played college football at Wyoming and Oklahoma.

== Early life ==
C. J. Coldon Jr. was born on September 3, 1998, in Belleville, Illinois. He played high school football at Althoff Catholic High School in Belleville. He recorded high school career totals of 84 solo tackles, 42 assisted tackles, and four interceptions on defense while also catching 126 passes for 2,277 yards and 24 touchdowns on offense. Coldon Jr. was named first-team all-state as a senior. In the class of 2017, he was rated a three-star recruit by both Rivals.com and Scout.com.

== College career ==
Coldon Jr. first played college football for the Wyoming Cowboys of the University of Wyoming. He was redshirted in 2017. He only played in three games in 2018 after suffering nerve damage to his left shoulder, recording six solo tackles, three assisted tackles, and one pass breakup. Coldon Jr. started the first three games of the 2019 season, totaling 11 solo tackles, three assisted tackles, one fumble recovery, and two pass breakups, before missing the rest of the year with a torn ACL. He started all six games during the COVID-19 shortened 2020 season, recording 17 solo tackles, nine assisted tackles, five pass breakups, and a team-high two interceptions. He started all 13 games in 2021, recording 48 solo tackles, 20 assisted tackles, one sack, ten pass breakups, and one fumble recovery. Coldon Jr. earned second-team All-Mountain West Conference honors for his performance during the 2021 season. He graduated from Wyoming with a bachelor's degree in American studies.

Coldon Jr. transferred to play for the Oklahoma Sooners of the University of Oklahoma in 2022. He appeared in 12 games, starting four, during the 2022 season, totaling 26 solo tackles, 17 assisted tackles, four interceptions, and six pass breakups. He was named honorable mention All-Big 12 by the coaches. At Oklahoma, Coldon Jr. majored in African and African American studies.

== Professional career ==
Pre-draft measurables
Height	Weight	Arm length	Hand span	Wingspan	40-yard dash	10-yard split	20-yard split	20-yard shuttle	Three-cone drill	Vertical jump	Broad jump
5 ft 10 1/8 in (1.78 m)	186 lb (84 kg)	31 1/8 in (0.79 m)	8 3/8 in (0.21 m)	6 ft 3 1/8 in (1.91 m)	4.63 s	1.58 s	2.72 s	4.24 s	7.31 s	37.5 in (0.95 m)	10 ft 5 in (3.18 m)
All values from Pro Day

At Oklahoma's pro day, Coldon Jr. recorded a 4.63-second 40-yard dash, a 4.24-second short shuttle, a 37.5-inch vertical jump, and a 10'5" broad jump.

=== Minnesota Vikings ===
On May 12, 2023, Coldon Jr. signed with the Minnesota Vikings after going undrafted in the 2023 NFL draft. On August 28, 2023, Coldon Jr. was waived by the Vikings.

On August 30, 2026, Coldon Jr. was re- signed by the Vikings, this time joining their practice squad. He was released on November 1, 2023.

=== Saskatchewan Roughriders ===
On February 1, 2024, Coldon Jr. was signed by the Saskatchewan Roughriders of the Canadian Football League (CFL). He was released on June 1, 2024.

=== Massachusetts Pirates ===
Following his release from the Roughriders, Coldon Jr. then briefly played for the Massachusetts Pirates of the Indoor Football League (IFL), during the 2024 IFL season. He dressed for one game where he posted two solo tackles, one assisted tackle, and one pass breakup.

=== Ottawa RedBlacks ===
On September 3, 2024, having left the Pirates organization, Coldon Jr. returned to the CFL sign with the Ottawa Redblacks and join their practice squad. On September 27, 2024, Coldon Jr. was promoted to the RedBlacks' active roster. He started the following day's game against his former Roughriders team where he posted seven defensive tackles, one forced fumble, and two pass breakups in a 29–16 loss. On October 12, 2024, Coldon Jr. was reassigned to the RedBlacks' practice roster. On November 4, 2024, Coldon Jr. was signed to a futures contract by the RedBlacks. He was released onn April 15, 2026.

=== BC Lions ===
On April 16, 2026, Coldon Jr. signed with the BC Lions. On September 12, Coldon Jr. was placed on the Lions' reserve roster for the remainder of the 2026 CFL season.
