= Michael Wakefield =

American gridiron football player (born 1994)

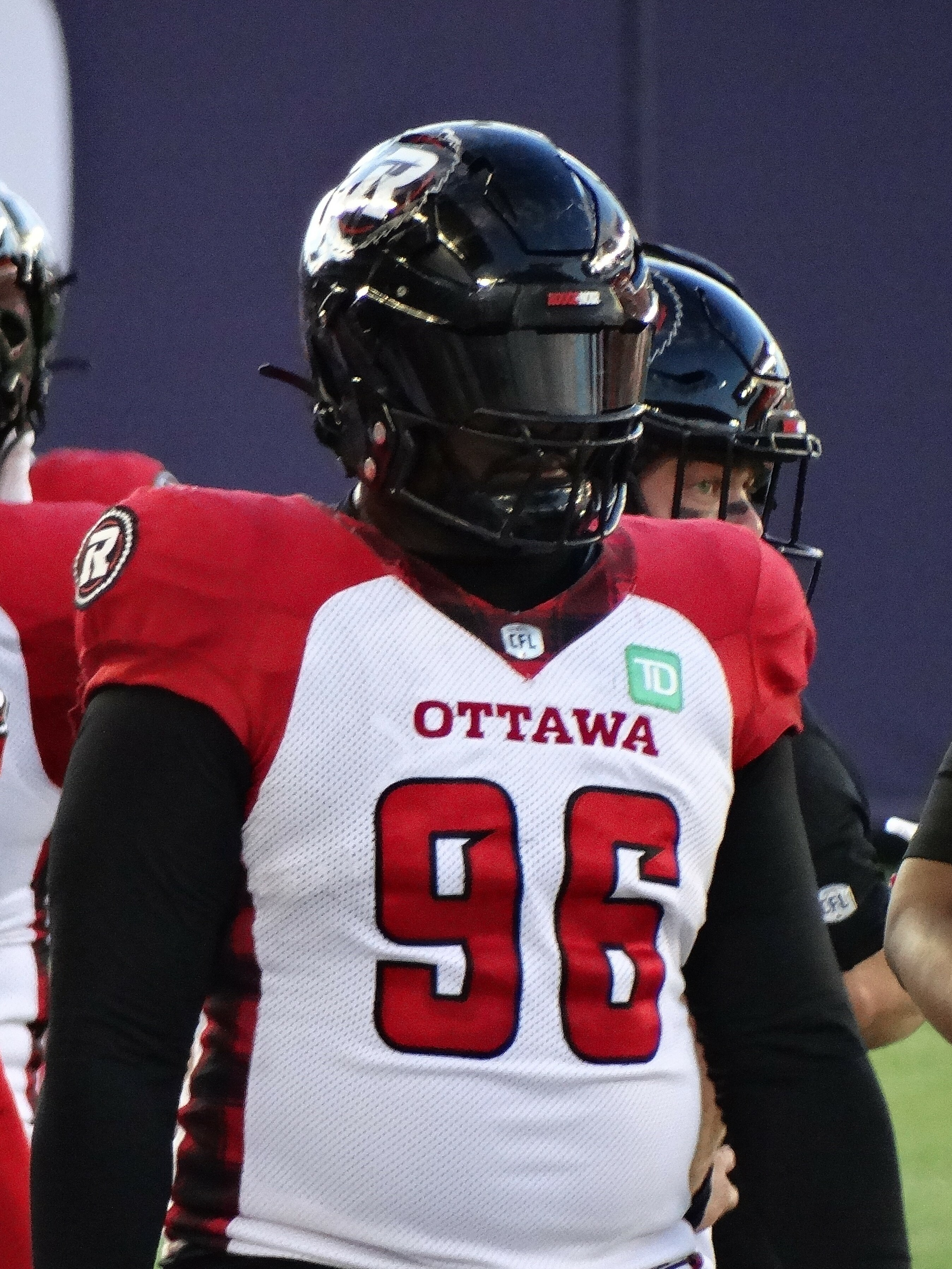
- Wakefield with the Ottawa Redblacks in 2023

No. 96 – Ottawa Redblacks
- Position: Defensive lineman
- Roster status: 6-game injured list
- CFL status: American

Personal information
- Born: January 12, 1994 (age 32); Valdosta, Georgia, U.S.
- Listed height: 6 ft 2 in (1.88 m)
- Listed weight: 260 lb (118 kg)

Career information
- High school: Valdosta High School
- College: FIU (2012–2015)
- NFL draft: 2016: undrafted

Career history
- Washington Redskins (2016)*; Ottawa Redblacks (2017–2020); Montreal Alouettes (2021–2022); Ottawa Redblacks (2023-present)
- * Offseason or practice squad member only

Awards and highlights
- CFL East All-Star (2024)

Career CFL statistics as of 2025
- Total tackles: 186
- Sacks: 31
- Forced fumbles: 3
- Interceptions: 1
- Stats at CFL.ca

Michael Wakefield (born January 12, 1994) is an American professional football defensive lineman for the Ottawa Redblacks of the Canadian Football League (CFL).

== College career ==
Wakefield played college football for the FIU Panthers from 2012 to 2015.

== Professional career ==
Pre-draft measurables
Height	Weight	Arm length	Hand span	Wingspan	40-yard dash	10-yard split	20-yard split	20-yard shuttle	Three-cone drill	Vertical jump	Broad jump	Bench press
6 ft 1 5/8 in (1.87 m)	257 lb (117 kg)	32 3/4 in (0.83 m)	9 1/4 in (0.23 m)	6 ft 6 1/4 in (1.99 m)	4.95 s	1.70 s	2.87 s	4.38 s	7.42 s	31.0 in (0.79 m)	9 ft 9 in (2.97 m)	16 reps
All values from Pro Day

=== Washington Redskins ===
After not being selected in the 2016 NFL draft, Wakefield signed with the Washington Redskins as an undrafted free agent in 2016, but was among the final training camp cuts in September 2016.

=== Ottawa Redblacks (first stint) ===
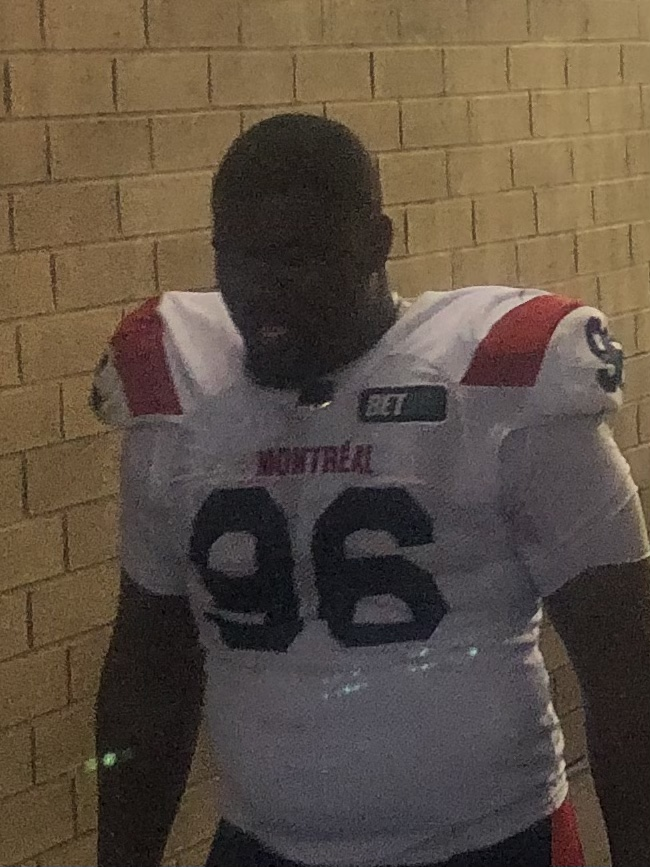
Wakefield with the Montreal Alouettes in 2022

On June 12, 2017, Wakefield signed with the Ottawa Redblacks. He played in his first professional game on August 31, 2017, against the Montreal Alouettes where he recorded one defensive tackle. That year, he played in six regular season games where he had four defensive tackles.

In 2018, Wakefield played in 17 regular season games where he had 18 defensive tackles and three sacks. He also played in his first career post-season games, in the East Final and the 106th Grey Cup. However, he did not record any statistics in the championship game as the Redblacks lost to the Calgary Stampeders. He re-signed with the Redblacks to a one-year extension on December 14, 2018. He had 32 defensive tackles, four sacks, and one interception in 16 games in 2019 as the Redblacks missed the post-season.

Wakefield re-signed with the Redblacks on January 20, 2020, but did not play that year due to the cancellation of the 2020 CFL season. He became a free agent upon the expiry of his contract on February 9, 2021.

=== Montreal Alouettes ===
On February 9, 2021, it was announced that Wakefield had signed with the Montreal Alouettes. He played in 12 regular season games where he had 23 defensive tackles and four sacks. In 2022, he played in 14 regular season games where he recorded 20 defensive tackles and three sacks. His contract expired on February 14, 2022.

=== Ottawa Redblacks (second stint) ===
On February 14, 2023, Wakefield signed with the Redblacks.

== Personal life ==
Wakefield was born to parents James and Alfrenett Wakefield. He has five siblings, Lakisha, Akeem, Jamie, James Jr., and Jeremy. Wakefield is married to Kelaysha Wakefield. He has one son Michael Jr.
