= Andre Miller (gridiron football) =

American gridiron football player (born 1998)

Profile
- Position: Wide receiver

Personal information
- Born: April 18, 1998 (age 28); Old Town, Maine, U.S.
- Listed height: 6 ft 2 in (1.88 m)
- Listed weight: 224 lb (102 kg)

Career information
- High school: Old Town
- College: Husson (2016); Maine (2018–2021)
- NFL draft: 2022: undrafted

Career history
- New York Giants (2022)*; Green Bay Packers (2023)*; Ottawa Redblacks (2024–2025); Toronto Argonauts (2026)*
- * Offseason or practice squad member only

Awards and highlights
- First-team All-CAA (2021)
- Stats at Pro Football Reference
- Stats at CFL.ca

Andre "Dre" Miller (born April 18, 1998) is an American professional football wide receiver. He played college football at Maine.

== College career ==
=== Husson ===
Andre Miller played wide receiver at Husson for his freshman season. In 2016, he played in 10 games with 13 receptions, 152 yards, and 1 touchdown.

=== Maine ===
In 2018, Miller appeared in 9 games and had 5 receptions with 109 yards, and 1 touchdown. During Maine's NCAA Semifinal game at Eastern Washington Miller had a career-highs in receptions 9 and receiving yards 129 with his first career touchdown.

In 2019, Miller appeared in 11 games and had 28 receptions with 528 yards, and 4 touchdowns. Miller set an all-time record with a 90-yard touchdown reception.

In 2021, Miller appeared in 9 games and had 39 receptions with 684 yards, and 6 touchdowns. He was named to the All-CAA First Team.

== Professional career ==
Pre-draft measurables
Height	Weight	Arm length	Hand span	Wingspan	40-yard dash	10-yard split	20-yard shuttle	Three-cone drill	Vertical jump	Broad jump	Bench press
6 ft 2 1/4 in (1.89 m)	224 lb (102 kg)	32 1/2 in (0.83 m)	10 5/8 in (0.27 m)	6 ft 6 in (1.98 m)	4.54 s	1.49 s	4.22 s	6.87 s	37 in (0.94 m)	10 ft 4 in (3.15 m)	19 reps
All values from Pro Day

=== New York Giants ===
Miller was signed by the New York Giants as an undrafted free agent on April 30, 2022, shortly after the conclusion of the 2022 NFL draft. After his signing, he converted to tight end. On August 23, 2022, he was placed on injured reserve with a fractured forearm. On January 22, 2023, Miller signed a reserve/future contract with the Giants.

On July 24, 2023, Miller was waived by the Giants.

=== Green Bay Packers ===
On August 1, 2023, Miller was signed by the Green Bay Packers. He was released on August 29, 2023.

=== Ottawa Redblacks ===
Miller signed with the Ottawa Redblacks on May 7, 2024. He was released on October 25, 2025.

=== Toronto Argonauts ===
It was announced on February 10, 2026, that Miller had signed with the Toronto Argonauts. He was released on May 31 as part of final roster cuts.
