= Drew Desjarlais =

Canadian gridiron football player (born 1997)

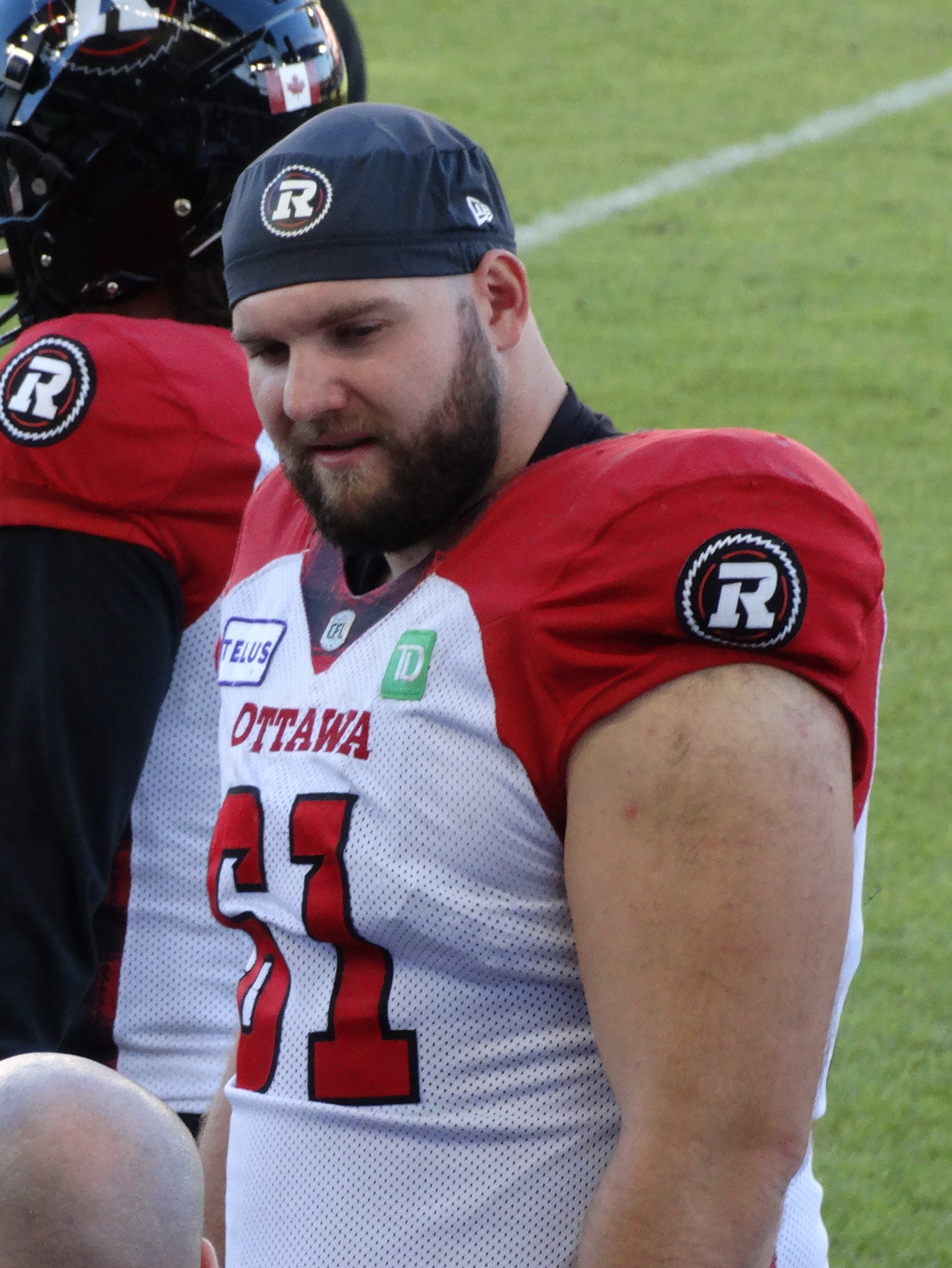
- Desjarlais with the Ottawa Redblacks in 2023

No. 61 – Ottawa Redblacks
- Position: Guard
- Roster status: 1-game injured list
- CFL status: National

Personal information
- Born: April 24, 1997 (age 29); Belle River, Ontario, Canada
- Listed height: 6 ft 2 in (1.88 m)
- Listed weight: 315 lb (143 kg)

Career information
- University: Windsor (2015–2018)
- NFL draft: 2019: undrafted
- CFL draft: 2019: 1st round, 4th overall pick

Career history
- Winnipeg Blue Bombers (2019–2021); New England Patriots (2022)*; New Orleans Saints (2022)*; Ottawa Redblacks (2023–present)
- * Offseason or practice squad member only

Awards and highlights
- 2× Grey Cup champion (2019, 2021); CFL West All-Star (2021); CFL East All-Star (2024)
- Stats at Pro Football Reference
- Stats at CFL.ca

Drew Desjarlais (born April 24, 1997) is a Canadian professional football guard for the Ottawa Redblacks of the Canadian Football League (CFL). He played college football at Windsor. He has also been a member of the Winnipeg Blue Bombers of the CFL, as well as the New England Patriots and New Orleans Saints of the National Football League (NFL).

== University career ==
Desjarlais played CIS football for the Windsor Lancers from 2015 to 2018.

== Professional career ==
Pre-draft measurables
Height	Weight	40-yard dash	20-yard shuttle	Three-cone drill	Vertical jump	Broad jump	Bench press
6 ft 2 1/4 in (1.89 m)	307 lb (139 kg)	5.19 s	4.57 s	7.75 s	30.0 in (0.76 m)	9 ft 1 in (2.77 m)	25 reps
All values from CFL Combine

=== Winnipeg Blue Bombers ===
Desjarlais was drafted fourth overall in the first round of the 2019 CFL draft by the Winnipeg Blue Bombers and signed with the team on May 11, 2019, despite receiving interest from the NFL. He made the team's active roster following training camp and played in his first professional game on June 15, 2019, against the BC Lions. He dressed as a backup for the first eight games of the season before making his first start on August 15, 2019, also against the Lions. He played in all 18 regular season games and started in the last ten games of the season. He also started in all three post-season games in 2019, including in the Blue Bombers' 107th Grey Cup victory over the Hamilton Tiger-Cats.

After the 2020 CFL season was cancelled, Desjarlais did not play in 2020. He played in all 14 regular season games in a shortened 2021 season. Desjarlais was named a West Division All-Star at the end of the season. In the post-season, he started both games as the Blue Bombers repeated as Grey Cup champions over the Tiger-Cats in the 108th Grey Cup game. As a pending free agent, Desjarlais was released in order to pursue a contract in the National Football League.

=== New England Patriots ===
On January 27, 2022, Desjarlais signed a reserve/future contract with the New England Patriots. He was waived on August 30, 2022.

=== New Orleans Saints ===
On September 1, 2022, Desjarlais was signed to the New Orleans Saints practice squad. He was released off the practice squad on September 20, 2022. He was re-signed on November 9.

=== Ottawa Redblacks ===
On January 30, 2023, it was announced that Desjarlais had signed with the Ottawa Redblacks to a two-year contract. The deal was reported for an average annual value of $255,000, which made him the highest-paid offensive lineman in the league.
