= Anthony Gosselin =

Canadian gridiron football player (born 1992)

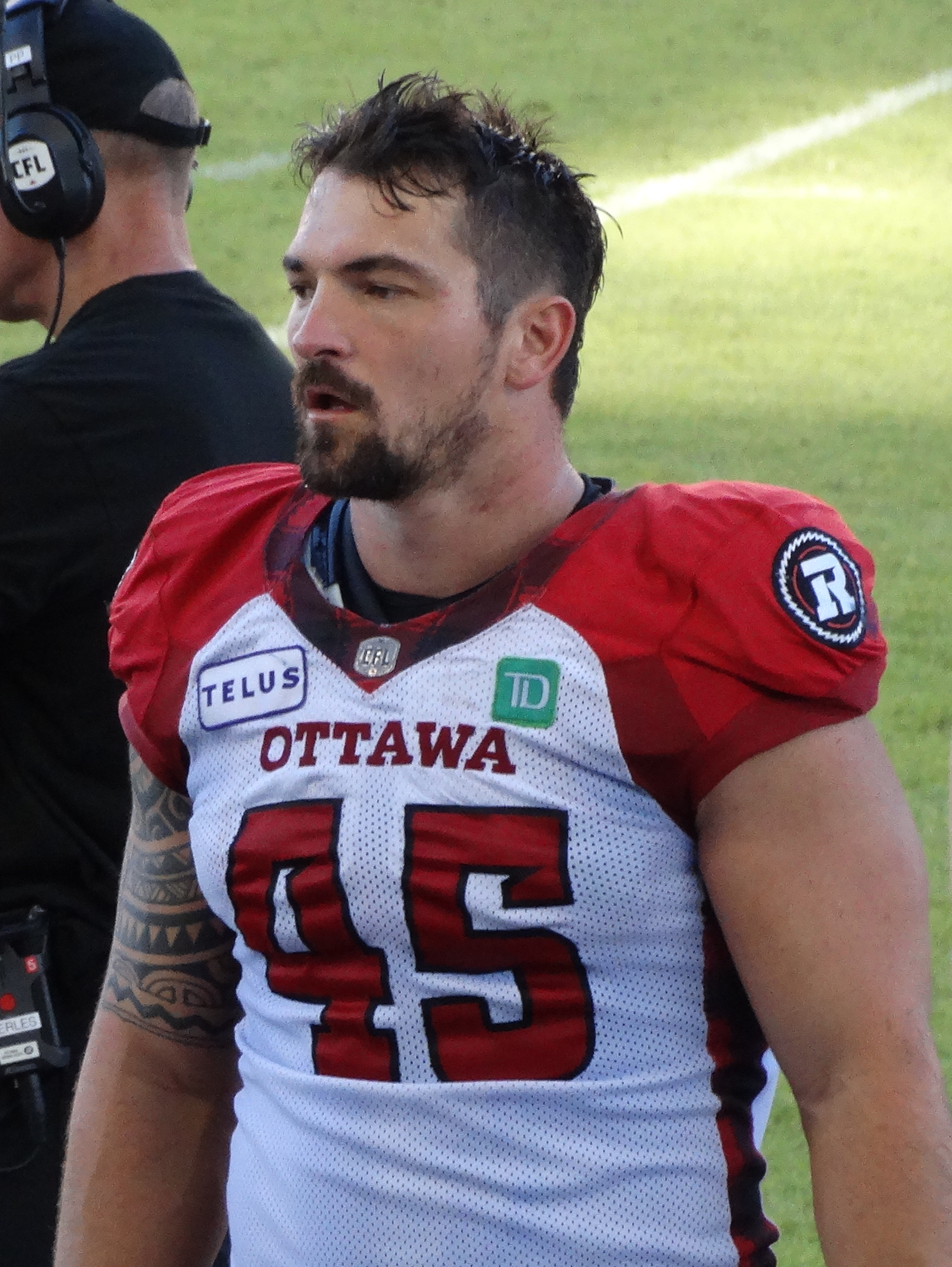
- Gosselin with the Ottawa Redblacks 2024

No. 45 – Ottawa Redblacks
- Position: Fullback
- Roster status: Active
- CFL status: National

Personal information
- Born: July 13, 1992 (age 34); Otterburn Park, Quebec, Canada
- Listed height: 6 ft 1 in (1.85 m)
- Listed weight: 232 lb (105 kg)

Career information
- University: Sherbrooke
- CFL draft: 2017: 2nd round, 18th overall pick

Career history
- 2017–present: Ottawa Redblacks
- Stats at CFL.ca

Anthony Gosselin (born July 13, 1992) is a Canadian professional football fullback for the Ottawa Redblacks of the Canadian Football League (CFL).

== Amateur career ==
Gosselin played football in CEGEP for the Drummondville Voltigeurs from 2010 to 2013. He then played U Sports football for the Sherbrooke Vert et Or from 2014 to 2016.

== Professional career ==
Pre-draft measurables
Height	Weight	40-yard dash	20-yard shuttle	Three-cone drill	Vertical jump	Broad jump	Bench press
6 ft 0 5/8 in (1.84 m)	251 lb (114 kg)	4.73 s	4.41 s	7.39 s	28.5 in (0.72 m)	9 ft 2 1/2 in (2.81 m)	30 reps
All values from CFL Combine

Gosselin was drafted by the Ottawa Redblacks in the second round with the 18th overall pick in the 2017 CFL draft and signed with the team on May 16, 2018. After training camp that year, he was named to the active roster and made his professional debut on June 23, 2017 against the Calgary Stampeders. He played in the first four regular season games and the last four games that season while spending the other games on the disabled list, injured list, and reserve roster. Gosselin played in his first post-season game on November 12, 2017 in the East Semi-Final loss to the Saskatchewan Roughriders.

In 2018, Gosselin played in six regular season games and had two receptions for four yards. In the 2019 season, he played in 15 games where he had three receptions for 18 yards and also had four special teams tackles. He did not play in 2020 with the cancellation of the 2020 CFL season. He re-signed with the Redblacks to a one-year extension on December 17, 2020. In the shortened 2021 season, Gosselin played in 12 regular season games where he had four receptions for 20 yards and four special teams tackles.

Gosselin played in all 18 regular season games in 2022 where he had four receptions for 35 yards and two special teams tackles. In 2023, he played in 16 games where he recorded two receptions for 27 yards and five special teams tackles.
