= 2026 Ottawa Redblacks season =

CFL team season

- General manager: Ryan Dinwiddie
- President: Adrian Sciarra (Until August 17); Vacant (August 18–October 19); Mike Morreale (Since October 20)
- Head coach: Ryan Dinwiddie
- Home stadium: TD Place Stadium

Results
- Record: 1–17
- Division place: 4th, East
- Playoffs: Did not qualify
- Team MOP: Ayden Eberhardt
- Team MODP: Nyles Morgan
- Team MOC: Keelan White
- Team MOOL: Drew Desjarlais
- Team MOST: Kalil Pimpleton
- Team MOR: Jelani Stafford

Uniform
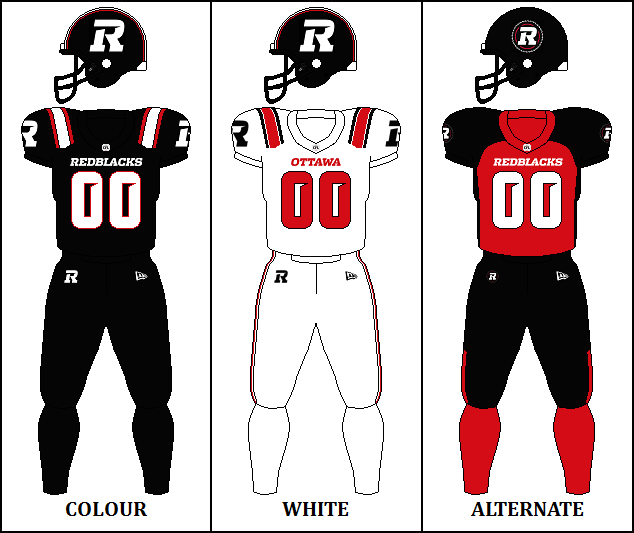

The 2026 Ottawa Redblacks season was the 12th season for the team since re-entering the Canadian Football League in 2014. The Redblacks were eliminated from playoff contention following their loss to the Toronto Argonauts and wins by the Winnipeg Blue Bombers and BC Lions in week 15. This was the second straight year and sixth instance in the last seven seasons that the team did not qualify for the post-season.

The 2026 CFL season was the first for Ryan Dinwiddie as the team's head coach and general manager after Bob Dyce was relieved of his coaching duties following the 2025 season and former general manager, Shawn Burke, was promoted to vice president of football operations. Amid a prolonged losing streak, team president, Adrian Sciarra, was removed from his position on August 17, 2026. Further changes were announced on August 23, 2026, as the team stated that Burke had also been relieved of his duties. On October 20, 2026, it was announced that Mike Morreale had been hired as the team's president.

After a 21–33 loss against the Winnipeg Blue Bombers on August 14, the Redblacks surpassed the 1994 Shreveport Pirates to hold the longest single season losing streak in CFL history at 15 losses, continuing the six-game losing streak that ended the 2025 season. The streak extended to 22 losses, becoming the second-longest losing streak in the Grey Cup era of Canadian football, behind only the 25 straight losses of the Ottawa Senators/Rough Riders from 1928 to 1932. The losing streak ended on October 16, 2026, when first-time starting quarterback Bryson Barnes led a late 24-second touchdown drive to defeat the Toronto Argonauts 40–39.

The Redblacks went 1–17, tied for the worst record in modern CFL history with the 2003 Hamilton Tiger-Cats.

== Offseason ==
=== CFL Canadian draft ===
The 2026 CFL draft took place on April 28, 2026. The Redblacks had seven selections in the eight-round draft. Not including traded picks or forfeitures, the team selected first in each round of the draft after finishing last in the 2025 league standings.

| Round | Pick | Player | Position | School |
|---|---|---|---|---|
| 1 | 1 | Giordano Vaccaro | OL | Purdue |
| 2 | 13 | Émeric Boutin | FB | Laval |
| 4 | 31 | Charlie Parks | DL | Saskatchewan |
| 5 | 39 | Alassane Diouf | OL | Montreal |
| 5 | 41 | Benjamin Dobson | LB | Calgary |
| 6 | 48 | Rene Konga | DL | Louisville |
| 8 | 66 | Josh Connors | LB | Wilfrid Laurier |

=== CFL global draft ===
The 2026 CFL global draft took place on April 29, 2026. The Redblacks had two selections in the draft, holding the first pick in each round.

| Round | Pick | Player | Position | School | Nationality |
|---|---|---|---|---|---|
| 1 | 1 | Aidan Laros | P | Kentucky | South Africa |
| 2 | 10 | Paul Geelen | K | Southern Illinois | Netherlands |

== Preseason ==
=== Schedule ===
| Week | Game | Date | Kickoff | Opponent | Results | | TV | Venue | Attendance | Summary |
| Week | Game | Date | Kickoff | Opponent | Score | Record | TV | Venue | Attendance | Summary |
|---|---|---|---|---|---|---|---|---|---|---|
| A | Bye | | | | | | | | | |
| B | 1 | Fri, May 22 | 7:00 p.m. EDT | at Montreal Alouettes | W 27–12 | 1–0 | RDS | Molson Stadium | N/A | Recap |
| C | 2 | Fri, May 29 | 7:00 p.m. EDT | vs. Montreal Alouettes | W 27–3 | 2–0 | TSN2/RDS | TD Place Stadium | N/A | Recap |

# Games played with colour uniforms.

== Regular season ==
=== Standings ===
East Division
| Team | GP | W | L | Pts | PF | PA | Div | Stk | |
|---|---|---|---|---|---|---|---|---|---|
| Montreal Alouettes | 18 | 14 | 4 | 28 | 624 | 476 | 8–0 | W1 | Details |
| Toronto Argonauts | 18 | 9 | 9 | 18 | 517 | 528 | 4–4 | L3 | Details |
| Hamilton Tiger-Cats | 18 | 6 | 12 | 12 | 443 | 523 | 3–5 | W1 | Details |
| Ottawa Redblacks | 18 | 1 | 17 | 2 | 437 | 673 | 1–7 | L1 | Details |

=== Schedule ===
| Week | Game | Date | Kickoff | Opponent | Results | | TV | Venue | Attendance | Summary |
| Week | Game | Date | Kickoff | Opponent | Score | Record | TV | Venue | Attendance | Summary |
|---|---|---|---|---|---|---|---|---|---|---|
| 1 | 1 | Sat, June 6 | 7:00 p.m. EDT | vs. Edmonton Elks | L 21–29 | 0–1 | TSN/RDS/CBSSN | TD Place Stadium | 15,038 | Recap |
| 2 | Bye | | | | | | | | | |
| 3 | 2 | Sat, June 20 | 1:00 p.m. EDT | vs. Toronto Argonauts | L 24–44 | 0–2 | TSN | TD Place Stadium | 13,943 | Recap |
| 4 | 3 | Sun, June 28 | 7:00 p.m. EDT | at Montreal Alouettes | L 35–37 | 0–3 | TSN/RDS/CBSSN | Molson Stadium | 17,138 | Recap |
| 5 | 4 | Fri, July 3 | 7:30 p.m. EDT | vs. Saskatchewan Roughriders | L 22–27 | 0–4 | TSN | TD Place Stadium | 15,154 | Recap |
| 6 | 5 | Thu, July 9 | 9:00 p.m. EDT | at Edmonton Elks | L 17–40 | 0–5 | TSN/RDS | Commonwealth Stadium | 15,898 | Recap |
| 7 | 6 | Sun, July 19 | 7:00 p.m. EDT | vs. Winnipeg Blue Bombers | L 34–36 (4OT) | 0–6 | TSN/RDS2/CBSSN | TD Place Stadium | 14,148 | Recap |
| 8 | Bye | | | | | | | | | |
| 9 | 7 | Fri, Jul 31 | 7:30 p.m. EDT | vs. Montreal Alouettes | L 13–34 | 0–7 | TSN/RDS/CBSSN | TD Place Stadium | 17,336 | Recap |
| 10 | 8 | Fri, Aug 7 | 9:00 p.m. EDT | at Saskatchewan Roughriders | L 20–42 | 0–8 | TSN/RDS/CBSSN | Mosaic Stadium | 29,798 | Recap |
| 11 | 9 | Fri, Aug 14 | 8:30 p.m. EDT | at Winnipeg Blue Bombers | L 21–33 | 0–9 | TSN/RDS2 | Princess Auto Stadium | 31,312 | Recap |
| 12 | 10 | Thu, Aug 20 | 7:00 p.m. EDT | at Montreal Alouettes | L 16–46 | 0–10 | TSN/RDS/CBSSN | Molson Stadium | 22,482 | Recap |
| 13 | 11 | Sun, Aug 30 | 7:00 p.m. EDT | vs. BC Lions | L 24–45 | 0–11 | TSN/RDS2/CBSSN | TD Place Stadium | 13,727 | Recap |
| 14 | Bye | | | | | | | | | |
| 15 | 12 | Sat, Sept 12 | 1:00 p.m. EDT | at Toronto Argonauts | L 23–26 | 0–12 | TSN/RDS | BMO Field | 12,494 | Recap |
| 16 | 13 | Sat, Sept 19 | 7:00 p.m. EDT | at Calgary Stampeders | L 38–40 | 0–13 | TSN/RDS2 | McMahon Stadium | 20,113 | Recap |
| 17 | 14 | Sat, Sept 26 | 3:00 p.m. EDT | vs. Calgary Stampeders | L 31–45 | 0–14 | TSN/RDS2/CTV | TD Place Stadium | 15,480 | Recap |
| 18 | 15 | Fri, Oct 2 | 7:00 p.m. EDT | vs. Hamilton Tiger-Cats | L 16–34 | 0–15 | TSN/RDS2 | TD Place Stadium | 15,308 | Recap |
| 19 | 16 | Fri, Oct 9 | 10:00 p.m. EDT | at BC Lions | L 20–41 | 0–16 | TSN/RDS | BC Place | 22,083 | Recap |
| 20 | 17 | Fri, Oct 16 | 7:00 p.m. EDT | vs. Toronto Argonauts | W 40–39 | 1–16 | TSN/RDS | TD Place Stadium | 16,371 | Recap |
| 21 | 18 | Sat, Oct 24 | 3:00 p.m. EDT | at Hamilton Tiger-Cats | L 22–35 | 1–17 | TSN/RDS2 | Hamilton Stadium | 21,449 | Recap |

# Games played with colour uniforms.
# Games played with white uniforms.
# Games played with alternate uniforms.

== Team ==
=== Roster ===
Ottawa Redblacks roster
| **Quarterbacks**: 17 Bryson Barnes; 3 McLeod Bethel-Thompson; 13 Jake Maier; **Receivers**: 7 Ayden Eberhardt; 2 Justin Hardy; 82 Ethan Jordan; 85 Cade McDonald; 83 Kalil Pimpleton; 81 Keelan White; **Running backs**: 25 Daniel Adeboboye; 34 Mario Anderson; **Fullbacks**: 30 Emeric Boutin; 45 Anthony Gosselin; 89 Jevoni Robinson | **Offensive linemen**: 63 Zach Barlev; 64 Dino Boyd; 61 Drew Desjarlais; 65 Alassane Diouf; 51 Sean McEwen; 54 Julian Pearl; 68 Giordano Vaccaro; **Defensive linemen**: 95 Amani Bledsoe; 29 Jessie Evans; 76 Kyron Johnson; 90 Cleyon Laing; 94 Charlie Parks; 97 Jelani Stafford; 44 Luiji Vilain | **Linebackers**: 0 A. J. Allen; 43 Michael Brodrique; 36 Aaron Casey; 19 Lucas Cormier; 1 Nyles Morgan; 32 Kyahva Tezino; **Defensive backs**: 20 Alonzo Addae; 27 King Ambers; 10 Kahzir Brown; 15 Eric Cumberbatch; 4 Ahmari Harvey; 23 Scott Hutter; 16 Dionté Ruffin; 28 Sage Ryan; **Special teams**: 18 Paul Geelen K; 33 Noah Gettman P; 59 Lucas Spencer LS | **Reserve**: 84 Nick Mardner WR; **1-game injured**: 38 Travian Blaylock DB; 55 Blessman Ta'ala DL; **6-game injured**: 53 Peter Adjey LS; 75 Muftah Ageli DL; 37 Marcus Barnes DB; 5 Greg Bell RB; 99 Dennis Briggs Jr. DL; 69 Samuel Carson OL; 91 Bryce Carter DL; 41 Brian Cole II LB; 24 Benjamin Dobson LB; 93 Aidan John DL; 31 Jeremy Lucien DB; 92 Daniel Okpoko DL; 52 Zack Pelehos OL; 42 James Peter LB; 49 Jamie Pettway LB; 8 C. J. Reavis DB; 98 Kori Roberson DL; 48 Sione Teuhema DL; 96 Michael Wakefield DL; 14 Bennett Williams DB | **Practice roster**: 47 Josh Connors LB; 66 Christian Coulter OL; 67 Anim Dankwah OL; 86 Grant Dubose WR; 22 Demarquis Gates LB; 39 Kenzel Lawler DB; 46 DaMarcus Mitchell DL; 50 Mahamane Moussa OL; 74 C. J. Nunnally IV DE; 9 Devyn Perkins DB; 35 Ricky Person Jr. DB; 88 Sam Schnee WR; 58 Eric Starczala OL; 80 Binjimen Victor WR; 73 Joey Zelinsky DL; **Suspended**: -- Andy Isabella WR; 65 Nouredin Nouili OL |
Italics indicate American player • **Bold** indicates Global player • 45 Active, 2 Reserve, 22 Injured, 15 Practice, 2 Suspended; Roster updated 2026-10-08 • Depth chart • Transactions • More CFL rosters

=== Coaching staff ===
Ottawa Redblacks staff
| **Front office**: Owner – Ottawa Sports and Entertainment Group (OSEG); Chief Executive Officer – Mark Goudie; Vice President of Football Operations – Shawn Burke; General manager – Ryan Dinwiddie; Assistant General Manager – Jeremy Snyder; Senior Football Advisor – Jim Popp; Director of Pro Personnel – Brendan Taman; Director of Canadian Scouting & Football Analytics – Chad Hudson; Assistant Director of US Scouting & Football Operations – Philippe Moreau; Senior Personnel Executive – Drew Allemang; Director of Football Operations – Joe Panessidi; Video Coordinator – Braun Gheller; Equipment Manager – Drew McCormick; **Head coach**: Head coach – Ryan Dinwiddie; **Offensive coaches**: Offensive Coordinator – Ryan Dinwiddie; Quarterbacks – Drew Tate; Offensive Line – Mike Gibson; Receivers – Pete Costanza; Running Backs – Evan Harrington | **Defensive coaches**: Defensive Coordinator – Jeff Reinebold; Defensive Line – Phillip Daniels; Linebackers – Damaso Munoz; Defensive Backs – Vacant; **Special teams coaches**: Special Teams Coordinator – Nate Taylor; **Strength and conditioning**: Strength and Conditioning Coordinator – Dylan Hines; → Coaching Staff → More CFL staffs |
