= Jessie Evans =

Jessie Evans may refer to:

- Jessie Evans (actress), 1918–1983, Welsh actress
- Jessie Evans (basketball) (born 1950), American college basketball coach
- Jessie Evans (Canadian football) (born 2002), American gridiron football player
- Jessie Evans (singer), American-born songwriter, singer, saxophonist and record producer in Germany
- Jessie Benton Evans, American artist
- Jesse Evans (1853–?), outlaw and gunman of the Old West
  - Jesse Evans Gang
