= List of current CFL staffs =

The following is a list of current Canadian Football League (CFL) team staffs:

== East Division ==
=== Hamilton Tiger-Cats ===
Hamilton Tiger-Cats staff
Front office: Caretaker – Bob Young; Chief executive officer – Scott Mitchell; President and chief operating officer – Matt Afinec; President of football operations – Orlondo Steinauer; Senior director of player personnel – Brock Sunderland; Assistant general manager – Alex Russell; Director of player personnel – Cyril Penn; Director of U.S. scouting – Dane Vandernat; Director of Canadian scouting – Tom Flaxman; Director of football operations – C. J. Paduano; Manager of football operations – Nick Roberto; Video Co-ordinator – Matt Allemang; Head coaches: Head Coach – Scott Milanovich; Assistant Head Coach – Bob Dyce; Offensive coaches: Offensive Coordinator and Quarterbacks – Jarryd Baines; Offensive Line – Brendan Walsh; Receivers – Naaman Roosevelt; Running Backs and Offensive Quality Control – Myer Spitulnik	Defensive coaches: Defensive Coordinator – Brent Monson; Defensive Line – Casey Creehan; Linebackers – Elijah Sandweiss; Defensive Backs – Brandon Isaac; Special teams coaches: Special Teams Coordinator – Bob Dyce; Co-Special Teams Coordinator – James Tuck; Assistant Special Teams – Elijah Sandweiss; Strength and conditioning: Strength and Conditioning Coach – Marcellus Bowman; → Coaching Staff → More CFL staffs

=== Montreal Alouettes ===
Montreal Alouettes staff
Front office: Owner – Pierre Karl Péladeau; President & CEO – Mark Weightman; General manager – Danny Maciocia; Assistant General Manager – Pier-Yves Lavergne; Assistant to the General Manager and Player Personnel – Marcel Desjardins; Senior Personnel Executive – Jean-Marc Edmé; Director of Player Personnel – Byron Archambault; Director of Football Operations – Allyson Sobol; Scout – Rob McIntyre; Head Video Coordinator – Rico Morotti; Head coaches: Head coach – Jason Maas; Assistant Head Coach/Special Teams Coordinator – Byron Archambault; Offensive coaches: Offensive Coordinator & Quarterbacks – Anthony Calvillo; Offensive Line – David Brown; Receivers & Pass Game Coordinator – Michael Lionello; Running Backs & Tight Ends – Dave Jackson; Offensive Assistant – Domenico Manno	Defensive coaches: Defensive Coordinator & Defensive Backs – Noel Thorpe; Linebackers – A. J. Gass; Defensive Line – Corvey Irvin; Defensive Assistant – Bryan Wyllie; Staff: Equipment Manager – David Deschamps; Head Athletic Therapist – Tristan Castonguay; Assistant Athletic Therapist - Dillon Warren; → Coaching Staff → More CFL staffs

=== Ottawa Redblacks ===
Ottawa Redblacks staff
Front office: Owner – Ottawa Sports and Entertainment Group (OSEG); Chief Executive Officer – Mark Goudie; Vice President of Football Operations – Shawn Burke; General manager – Ryan Dinwiddie; Assistant General Manager – Jeremy Snyder; Director of Pro Personnel – Brendan Taman; Director of Canadian Scouting & Football Analytics – Chad Hudson; Assistant Director of US Scouting & Football Operations – Philippe Moreau; Senior Personnel Executive – Drew Allemang; Director of Football Operations – Joe Panessidi; Video Coordinator – Braun Gheller; Equipment Manager – Drew McCormick; Head coach: Head coach – Ryan Dinwiddie; Offensive coaches: Offensive Coordinator – Ryan Dinwiddie; Quarterbacks – Drew Tate; Offensive Line – Mike Gibson; Receivers – Pete Costanza; Running Backs – Evan Harrington	Defensive coaches: Defensive Coordinator – Jeff Reinebold; Defensive Line – Phillip Daniels; Linebackers – Damaso Munoz; Defensive Backs – Vacant; Special teams coaches: Special Teams Coordinator – Nate Taylor; Strength and conditioning: Strength and Conditioning Coordinator – Erin Craig; → Coaching Staff → More CFL staffs

=== Toronto Argonauts ===
Toronto Argonauts staff
Front office and support staff: Owner – Maple Leaf Sports & Entertainment; President – Vacant; General manager – Michael Clemons; Director, Player Personnel – Jim Barker; Senior Advisor – John Hufnagel; Director, Football Operations – Melissa Firth; Pro Scout Coordinator – Afram Jolak; Pro and Canadian Scouting Assistant – Nate Bickford; Head Athletic Therapist – Josh Shewell; Assistant Athletic Therapist – Mark Belmore; Equipment Manager – Danny Webb; Assistant Equipment Manager – David Sillberg; Strength and Conditioning – Usama Mujtaba; Manager, Football Media – Chris Balenovich; Manager, Communications – Mike Hogan	Head coaches: Head Coach – Mike Miller; Assistant Head Coach – Demetrious Maxie; Offensive coaches: Offensive coordinator – Mike Miller; Quarterbacks – Chris Miller; Receivers – Kierrie Johnson; Offensive Line – Dominic Picard; Running backs – Ka'Deem Carey; Assistant Offensive Line and Quality Control – Colyn Haugh; Defensive coaches: Defensive Coordinator and Linebackers – Greg Quick; Defensive Backs – Jovon Johnson; Defensive Line – Demetrious Maxie; Assistant Linebackers and Quality Control – Bubba Walker; Special teams coaches: Special Teams Coordinator – Mickey Donovan; → Coaching Staff → More CFL staffs

== West Division ==
=== BC Lions ===
BC Lions staff
Front office and support staff: Owner – Amar Doman; President and CEO – Duane Vienneau; Senior Vice President, Business – George Chayka; Vice President, Football Operations – Neil McEvoy; General manager – Ryan Rigmaiden; Assistant General Manager – Rob Ralph; Director of US Scouting – Jim Jauch; Manager, Football Operations – Tyler Gammon; U. S. Scout – Will Ark; Video Coordinator – Derek Oswalt; Head Athletic Therapist – Tristan Sandhu; Equipment Manager – Aaron Yeung	Head coach: Head coach/Offensive coordinator – Buck Pierce; Offensive coaches: Receivers and Pass Game Coordinator – Kevin Bourgoin; Offensive Line – Paul Charbonneau; Running Backs – Kristian Matte; Defensive coaches: Defensive Coordinator – Mike Benevides; Defensive Line – Randy Melvin; Linebackers – Glen Young; Secondary and Pass Game Coordinator – Ryan Phillips; Special teams coaches: Special Teams Coordinator – Dennis McKnight; Special Teams Assistant – Derek Oswalt; → Coaching Staff → More CFL staffs

=== Calgary Stampeders ===
Calgary Stampeders staff
Front office: President – Jay McNeil; General manager – Dave Dickenson; Director of Player Personnel – Brendan Mahoney; Director of U.S. Scouting – Cole Hufnagel; Football Administration Director – Molly Campbell; Director of Football Operations – Nick Bojda; CFL Draft Coordinator – Dwayne Cameron; Head coach: Head coach – Dave Dickenson; Offensive coaches: Offensive Coordinator and Running Backs – Pat DelMonaco; Quarterbacks – Jarious Jackson; Receivers – Markus Howell; Offensive Line – Ucambre Williams; Offensive and Special Teams Assistant – Colton Hunchak	Defensive coaches: Defensive Coordinator – Bob Slowik; Linebackers and Run Game Coordinator – Marcus Klund; Defensive Line – John Bowman; Defensive Backs – Barron Miles; Special teams coaches: Special Teams Coordinator – Craig Dickenson; Strength and conditioning: Strength and Conditioning – Daryl Chambers; → Coaching Staff → More CFL staffs

=== Edmonton Elks ===
Edmonton Elks staff
Front office: Owner – Deb Thompson; President and CEO – Chris Morris; General manager – Ed Hervey; Senior Assistant General Manager – Spencer Zimmerman; Direct of U.S. Scouting – Spencer Boehm; Direct of Canadian Scouting – Rich Massaro; Direct of Football Operations – Nick Pelletier; Football Operations Assistant – Nic Cross; Equipment Manager – Dan Rosnau; Head coaches: Head coach – Mark Kilam; Assistant Head Coach/Offensive Coordinator – Jordan Maksymic; Offensive coaches: Offensive Line and Run Game Coordinator – Stephen Sorrells; Running Backs – Jabari Arthur; Receivers – Jason Tucker	Defensive coaches: Defensive Coordinator and Linebackers – J. C. Sherritt; Defensive Line – Cedric Douglas; Defensive Backs – Aaron Grymes; Defensive Quality Control – Danny Nesbitt; Defensive Analyst – Anthony Vitale; Special teams coach: Special Teams Coach – Des Catellier; Strength and conditioning: Strength and Conditioning Specialist – Danelle Tucker; → Coaching staff → More CFL staffs

=== Saskatchewan Roughriders ===
Saskatchewan Roughriders staff
Front office: President and CEO – Craig Reynolds; General manager and Vice President of Football Operations – Jeremy O'Day; Assistant General Manager – Paul Jones; Assistant General Manager – Kyle Carson; Director of Football Operations – Jordan Greenly; Player Personnel Coordinator – Larry Dean; Head Athletic Therapist – Greg Mayer; Manager of Equipment – Gordon Gilroy; Head coach: Head coach – Corey Mace; Offensive coaches: Offensive Coordinator – Marc Mueller; Offensive Line – Edwin Harrison; Receivers – Marquay McDaniel; Running Backs – Andrew Harris; Offensive Assistant – Josh Donnelly	Defensive coaches: Defensive Coordinator – Josh Bell; Run Game Coordinator and Linebackers – Travis Brown; Defensive Line – Micah Johnson; Defensive Backs – Jordan Linnen; Special teams coaches: Special Teams Coordinator – Kent Maugeri; Special Teams Assistant – Jeff Stusek; Strength and conditioning: Head of Strength and Conditioning – Dan Farthing; → Coaching Staff → More CFL staffs

=== Winnipeg Blue Bombers ===
Winnipeg Blue Bombers staff
Front office: Owner – Winnipeg Football Club; Chairperson of the Board of Governors – Dayna Spiring; President/CEO – Wade Miller; General manager of Football Operations – Kyle Walters; Assistant General Manager / Director of U.S. Scouting – Danny McManus; Senior Director of Player Personnel — Jim Jauch; Senior Director of Player Personnel — Eric Deslauriers; Director of Football Operations – Matt Gulakow; Equipment staff: Head Equipment Manager – Brad Fotty; Assistant Equipment Manager – Kevin Todd	Head coach: Head coach – Mike O'Shea; Offensive coaches: Offensive Coordinator – Tommy Condell; Quarterbacks – Jarious Jackson; Receivers – Billy Jean; Running Backs – André Bolduc; Running Backs – Jason Hogan; Offensive Line – Marty Costello; Defensive coaches: Defensive Coordinator – Jordan Younger; Defensive Line – Jake Thomas; Pass Game Analyst and Linebackers – James Stanley; Defensive Assistant – Richie Hall; Special teams coaches: Special Teams Coordinator – Mike Miller; Video coaches: Video Coordinator – Evan Best; → Coaching Staff → More CFL staffs
