= Ottawa Redblacks =

Canadian professional football team

- Current season
- Logo
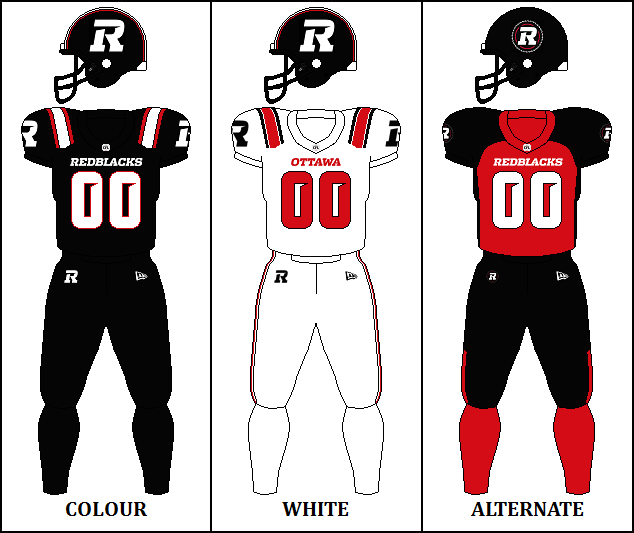
- Uniforms

General information
- Founded: 2014
- Stadium: TD Place (2014–present)
- Headquartered: Ottawa, Ontario, Canada
- Colours: Red, black, white
- Mascot: Big Joe/Grand Jos
- Website: www.ottawaredblacks.com

Personnel
- Owner: Ottawa Sports and Entertainment Group
- General manager: Ryan Dinwiddie
- Head coach: Ryan Dinwiddie
- President: Mike Morreale

League / conference affiliations
- Canadian Football League: East Division

Championships
- Grey Cup win(s): 1 (2016)

The Ottawa Redblacks (officially stylized as REDBLACKS) (French: Rouge et Noir d'Ottawa) are a professional Canadian football team based in Ottawa. The team plays in the East Division of the Canadian Football League (CFL).

Starting play in 2014, the Redblacks are the third CFL team to play in the city of Ottawa. The Ottawa Rough Riders, formed in 1876, were a founding member of the CFL in 1958 and played until 1996. A new Ottawa franchise was formed as the Renegades in 2002 and lasted until the end of the 2005 season. The Redblacks won the 2016 Grey Cup Championship, which ended a 40-year Grey Cup championship drought for the city of Ottawa.

== History ==
Following the 1996 season, years of ownership and management issues resulted in the Ottawa Rough Riders franchise folding after a storied 120 years. A CFL franchise in Ottawa was absent for the next five years until 2002, when football returned with new ownership and a new team name, the Ottawa Renegades. Ownership and management controversies soon overtook the new franchise and the Renegades abruptly ceased operations prior to the 2006 CFL season. The league liquidated the Renegades roster in a dispersal draft and placed the Ottawa CFL franchise up for sale, with the intention of eventually returning to the city.

=== Legislative and construction hurdles to new franchise ===
On March 25, 2008, Jeff Hunt, the owner of the Ontario Hockey League's Ottawa 67's, spearheaded a group that was awarded a franchise. The team planned to begin play in 2010, but cracks in the concrete structure in the south stands of Frank Clair Stadium led to the demolition of those stands and delayed the start of team operations. The league then set a new date of 2013 for the team's debut, but lawsuits forced the delay of reconstruction of the stadium to be pushed back even further. The team and league then announced plans to play at a remodelled Frank Clair Stadium—now called TD Place Stadium—by 2014 if construction remained on schedule. In 2008, the franchise was conditionally awarded the right to host the 2014 Grey Cup game, but the owners preferred to postpone the game for a few years to give the franchise a better chance to play in the championship game. In any event, after lawsuits and delays, the stadium renovations were not completed until 2014. Hosting the Grey Cup is a condition included in the agreement of franchise ownership. A CA$7-million franchise fee was reported to have been paid to the CFL.

Concurrently, Ottawa Senators owner Eugene Melnyk had announced plans to bid for a Major League Soccer franchise to play in Ottawa, intending to build a new soccer-specific stadium near the Senators' Scotiabank Place (now Canadian Tire Centre) in support of that plan. Questions arose about the stadium's suitability for football in place of the aging Frank Clair Stadium. However, the CFL and MLS groups could not come to any agreement on coordinating their plans. Furthermore, municipal officials questioned whether the city could support both CFL and MLS franchises.

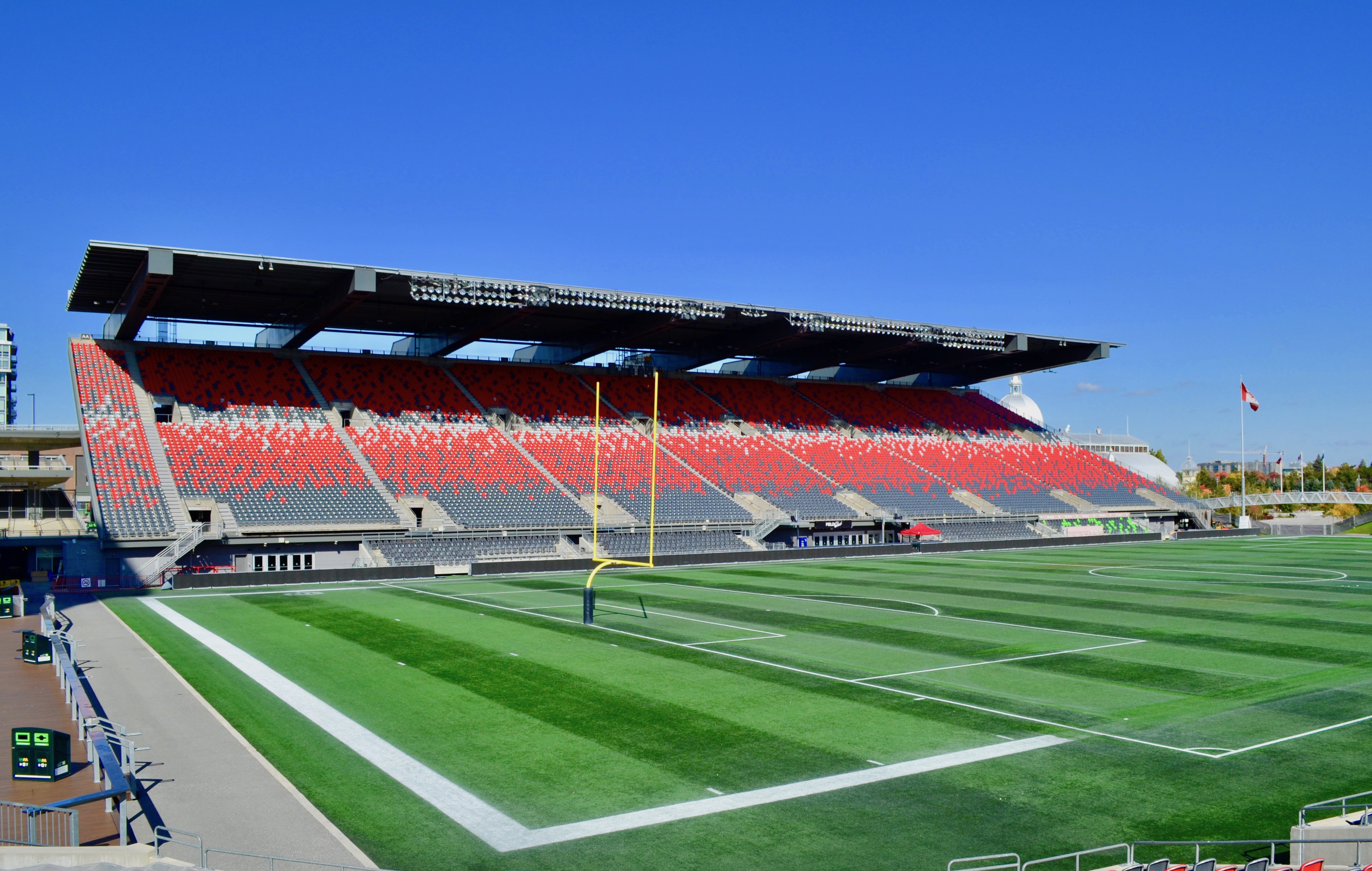
The north-side stands of TD Place at Lansdowne Park

In April 2009, the staff of the city of Ottawa presented a report to the city council on the merits of the soccer stadium and Lansdowne Park proposals. The city held public hearings based on the report, which questioned the necessity of the spending but gave a slight edge to the Lansdowne proposal. Councillors attempted to learn whether the SSE group would support sharing their stadium with a planned CFL franchise, but the SSE group rejected such a possibility. Consequently, on April 22, 2009, the city council chose the Lansdowne proposal over the SSE proposal as its choice for an outdoor stadium. Negotiations were conducted over the next several months, leading to an August 26 presentation to the council so that it could decide the fate of football in Ottawa in the foreseeable future.

On November 12 and 13, the council held a public debate to discuss what should be done with the area at Lansdowne Park. Guest speakers included CFL Commissioner Mark Cohon and former Rough Riders Jock Climie and Mark Kosmos, who presented their case as to why the Lansdowne Live group was an important contributor to the city of Ottawa. The following Monday, November 16, it was reported that the council had voted 15–9 in favour of plans to redevelop Lansdowne Park to house a CFL team. The ownership group was given until June 2010 to sort out the details of the redevelopment, with construction set to begin in the spring of 2011.

On June 28, 2010, after a twelve-hour meeting, the city council approved the plan to redevelop Lansdowne Park by the same 15–9 vote, all but securing a franchise in the nation's capital. With construction on the stadium scheduled to begin in 2011, the earliest the team would have been able to play was 2013 under the original timeline. However, a failed legal challenge and an Ontario Municipal Board hearing on the Lansdowne Park redevelopment project delayed the start of construction until 2013 with completion targeted for the summer of 2015, although there were indications that the stadium could be opened for football as early as 2014. Without a viable stadium, the debut of the team was necessarily pushed back accordingly.

On October 10, 2012, the new franchise cleared its final political hurdle with a 21–3 vote by the city council in favour of Lansdowne. Construction on the north and south side stands was set to begin in October 2012.

=== Start of football operations (2013) ===
On January 30, 2013, Marcel Desjardins was named the first general manager in Redblacks history. Desjardins named former Montreal Alouettes scouting director and New York Jets pro scout Brock Sunderland as his assistant GM in late May 2013. On December 6, 2013, Desjardins hired Rick Campbell as the team's first head coach. Campbell is the son of former Edmonton Eskimos coaching legend Hugh Campbell, who coached the team to five consecutive Grey Cups from 1978 to 1982.

One year before the new Ottawa club hit the field for the 2014 CFL season, it was allowed to draft four NCAA junior redshirts (players who would participate in the 2013 NCAA football season) as part of the 2013 CFL draft. The draft took place on May 6, 2013, when Ottawa had the last pick in the first four rounds of the draft (9th, 18th, 27th and 36th overall selections). The team selected Nolan MacMillan from Iowa, Connor Williams from Utah State, Kalonji Kashama from Eastern Michigan and Tyler Digby from Robert Morris.

The 2013 CFL Expansion Draft was a three-round CFL draft held on December 16, 2013, in which players from existing CFL teams were assigned to the new Ottawa team. The structure of the draft was announced on January 19, 2011, which involved one round for selecting import players and two rounds for selecting non-import players. Ottawa selected three players from each of the eight existing teams for a total of 24 players. The team was allowed to select eight import players and 16 non-import players with quarterbacks, kickers and punters eligible within their respective import/non-import categories. Ottawa was permitted to select a maximum of two quarterbacks and one kicker/punter, but not to select any two of these three players from the same team. CFL commissioner Mark Cohon was authorized to resolve any dispute related to player eligibility for the Expansion Draft process. The selections were announced live on the CFL's official website on December 16, 2013.

=== First season (2014) ===
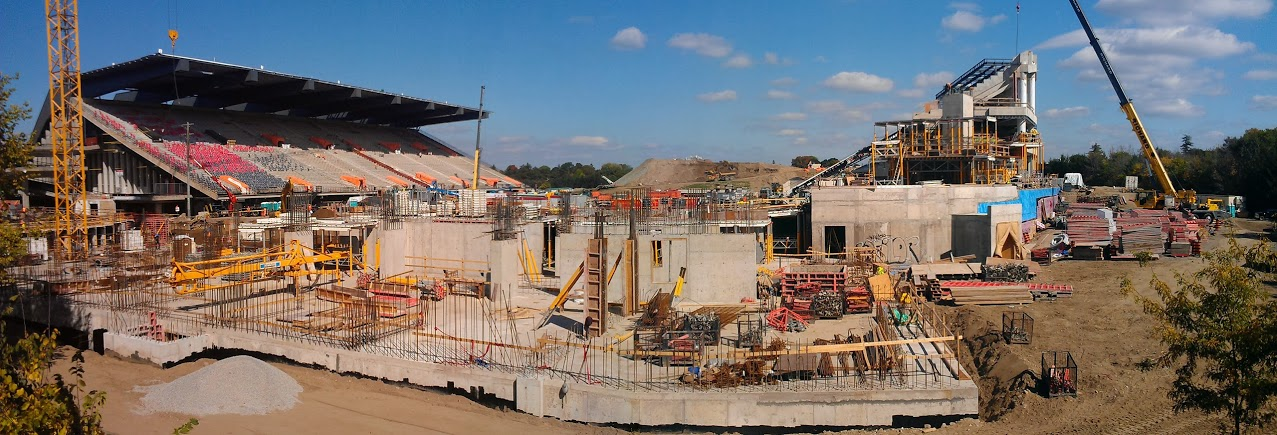
The progress of construction at TD Place Stadium, September 27, 2013

On July 3, 2014, the Ottawa Redblacks played their first regular-season game, a road match against the Winnipeg Blue Bombers, scoring touchdowns on their first three possessions in the opening quarter, but ultimately losing 36–28. On July 18, 2014, the Redblacks earned their first regular-season win at their home opener by a score of 18–17 over the Toronto Argonauts. The Redblacks, like most expansion teams, struggled during the whole season, and finished last in both the East Division and the league with a 2–16 record.

=== Young contenders (2015–2018) ===
In their second season, the Redblacks brought in significant talent to improve the offence. The result was a greatly improved team that won eight of its last 10 regular-season games, finishing with a record of 12–6 to finish atop the East Division and clinch a first-round bye. It was the first regular-season division title for an Ottawa-based team since 1978. On November 22, 2015, the Redblacks defeated the Hamilton Tiger-Cats 35–28 in the East Final to advance to the 103rd Grey Cup. In doing so, they became the first Ottawa CFL team to reach the Grey Cup since the 1981 Rough Riders. They also became the second-youngest team to reach a Grey Cup final, bettered only by the 1994 Baltimore CFLers. In their first-ever Grey Cup appearance, the Redblacks lost 26–20 to the Edmonton Eskimos.

The Redblacks struggled during the following season, finishing with an 8–9–1 record. However, the East Division was so weak that season, the Redblacks won their second consecutive division title—and with it, a bye into the East Final. Because of the CFL's crossover playoff format, Ottawa faced the Western Division's Edmonton Eskimos, winning 35–23. In the Grey Cup, the Redblacks won the franchise's first championship—and the first for an Ottawa-based team in 40 years—by defeating the heavily favored Calgary Stampeders 39–33 in only the third Grey Cup game in history to go into overtime.

The Redblacks went into the 2017 season with high hopes as defending champions. Despite losing Henry Burris to retirement and key contributors such as Kienan LaFrance and Ernest Jackson to free agency, the Redblacks finished the season with another 8–9–1 record, which was good enough for second place in the East Division, behind the Toronto Argonauts. The Redblacks struggled with injuries and inconsistent play throughout the course of the season. Their quest for a second consecutive Grey Cup fell short as the team lost to the Saskatchewan Roughriders, which crossed over to play the Redblacks in the East Division semifinal. The Redblacks returned to form in 2018, winning their third divisional title in four years. After defeating the Tiger-Cats in the East Final, they advanced to the 106th Grey Cup game, where they were defeated by the Calgary Stampeders, which were making their third consecutive Grey Cup appearance.

=== Campbell and Desjardins' departure (2019–2021) ===
The 2019 season was one to forget for the Redblacks. The team lost their main offensive stars, Trevor Harris and Greg Ellingson, in free agency as both players signed with the Edmonton Eskimos. The team's offensive coordinator Jaime Elizondo resigned in mid-April to take a job with the Tampa Bay Vipers of the XFL and was replaced two weeks later by former Renegades head coach Joe Paopao, who served as the team's running backs coach and offensive playcaller. Their quarterbacking position was in flux for most of the season as Jonathon Jennings, Dominique Davis, and Will Arndt all spent time under centre.

Midway through the season, with the offense sputtering, Campbell turned over the role of offensive play-calling to Paopao, changing his role with the team from running backs coach to quarterbacks coach in the process. After a 2–0 start, the team lost four in a row and capped off the season by losing 11 consecutive games, finishing the year at 3–15, good enough for fourth in the East, and ninth place overall in the CFL. Following the season, Campbell and the Redblacks mutually agreed to part ways.

On December 7, 2019, the Redblacks hired former Winnipeg Blue Bombers head coach Paul LaPolice as the second head coach in franchise history. Following a record of 3–15 in 2019 and the team being eliminated from playoff contention in 2021 with a record of 2–9, the Redblacks fired general manager Marcel Desjardins on October 25, 2021.

== Team name ==
Initially, Hunt hoped to revive the Rough Riders name. Almost as soon as they won the franchise, Hunt and his group made contact with previous Rough Riders owner Horn Chen regarding the name, and they were well aware of Chen's asking price for the Rough Riders logo and wordmarks. The Rough Riders name was still popular among former players and football fans in Ottawa. The Rough Riders played for 120 years, during which time they played for the Grey Cup 15 times, winning nine. However, in July 2010, the ownership group announced that while they had acquired the Rough Riders intellectual properties—including their trademarks—from Chen, the Rough Riders name likely would not be returning because of objections from the Saskatchewan Roughriders.

On December 6, 2012, the CFL opened six days of voting for the new name on www.nameourteams.com. The team was speculated to be called the Rush, but this was later debunked. The Rush name was nonetheless included in a list of five potential names (along with Nationals, Voyageurs, Redblacks, and Raftsmen) in a focus group led by the team's owners in January 2013.

On May 30, 2013, the website SportsLogos.net reported that the ownership group had filed copyright protection for the nickname "Redblacks" (and its French equivalent, Rouge et Noir) with the Canadian Intellectual Property Office. On June 8, 2013, the team confirmed it would be known as the Ottawa Redblacks. On the same day, the team also revealed its logo—an italicized version of the block "R" that had appeared on the Rough Riders' helmets from 1975 to 1991 (with artistic ink traps) surrounded by a red outline inside a black saw blade. The home uniforms were predominantly black, with white numerals and red-and-white trim. The road uniforms were white, with red numerals and red-and-black trim.

For record-keeping, the CFL now recognizes all three Ottawa-based clubs that played in the CFL or the league's predecessors—the Rough Riders (known as the Ottawa Football Club from 1876 to 1898 and the Ottawa Senators from 1926 to 1930), the Renegades, and the Redblacks—as "a single entity" dating to 1876, with "two intervals of nonparticipation (1997–2001 & 2006–2013)."

== Rivals ==
Based on their nearby geography the traditional Ottawa rivalry is with the Montreal Alouettes, whom they often play in the Labour Day Classic, and Montreal is part of the divisional rivalry with the Hamilton Tiger-Cats and the Toronto Argonauts. Although separated by distance and division, the Calgary Stampeders have emerged as a main rival of the Redblacks franchise.

== Honoured players ==
=== Retired numbers ===
On July 18, 2014, at halftime of the first home game in franchise history, the Redblacks announced they would be retiring all 10 jersey numbers previously retired by the Ottawa Rough Riders. The club has stated that they will not retire numbers in the future due to a limitation of number availability among certain positions.

Ottawa Redblacks retired numbers
No.	Player	Position	Tenure	Championships
11	Ron Stewart	RB	1958–1970	1960, 1968, 1969
12	Russ Jackson	QB	1958–1969	1960, 1968, 1969
26	Whit Tucker	WR	1962–1970	1968, 1969
40	Bruno Bitkowski	C/DE	1951–1962	1951, 1960
60	Jim Coode	OT	1974–1980	1976
62	Moe Racine	OT/K	1958–1974	1960, 1968, 1969, 1973
70	Bobby Simpson	FW/E/DB	1950–1962	1951, 1960
71	Gerry Organ	K/P/WR	1971–1983	1973, 1976
72	Tony Golab	FW/HB	1939–1941; 1945–1950	1940
77	Tony Gabriel	TE	1975–1981	1976

=== Wall of Honour ===
All 10 retired numbers are featured on the club's Wall of Honour in the stadium. Additionally, Henry Burris was added to the Wall on September 9, 2017, at halftime in a game against the Hamilton Tiger-Cats. On September 10, 2019, the CFL Ottawa Alumni Association Board of Directors announced they had assigned a committee to select former Ottawa players to be added to the Wall of Honour with a goal of adding more in future years. In that same announcement, the club revealed that Kaye Vaughan would be the 12th member added to the Wall of Honour.

Ottawa Redblacks Wall of Honour additions
No.	Player	Position	Tenure	Championships
1	Henry Burris	QB	2014–2016	2016
55	Kaye Vaughan	OT/OG/DT	1953–1964	1960

== Roster ==
Ottawa Redblacks roster
**Quarterbacks**: 17 Bryson Barnes; 3 McLeod Bethel-Thompson; 13 Jake Maier; **Receivers**: 7 Ayden Eberhardt; 2 Justin Hardy; 82 Ethan Jordan; 85 Cade McDonald; 83 Kalil Pimpleton; 81 Keelan White; **Running backs**: 25 Daniel Adeboboye; 34 Mario Anderson; **Fullbacks**: 30 Emeric Boutin; 45 Anthony Gosselin; 89 Jevoni Robinson	**Offensive linemen**: 63 Zach Barlev; 64 Dino Boyd; 61 Drew Desjarlais; 65 Alassane Diouf; 51 Sean McEwen; 54 Julian Pearl; 68 Giordano Vaccaro; **Defensive linemen**: 95 Amani Bledsoe; 29 Jessie Evans; 76 Kyron Johnson; 90 Cleyon Laing; 94 Charlie Parks; 97 Jelani Stafford; 44 Luiji Vilain	**Linebackers**: 0 A. J. Allen; 43 Michael Brodrique; 36 Aaron Casey; 19 Lucas Cormier; 1 Nyles Morgan; 32 Kyahva Tezino; **Defensive backs**: 20 Alonzo Addae; 27 King Ambers; 10 Kahzir Brown; 15 Eric Cumberbatch; 4 Ahmari Harvey; 23 Scott Hutter; 16 Dionté Ruffin; 28 Sage Ryan; **Special teams**: 18 Paul Geelen K; 33 Noah Gettman P; 59 Lucus Spencer LS	**Reserve**: 84 Nick Mardner WR; **1-game injured**: 38 Travian Blaylock DB; 55 Blessman Ta'ala DL; **6-game injured**: 53 Peter Adjey LS; 75 Muftah Ageli DL; 37 Marcus Barnes DB; 5 Greg Bell RB; 99 Dennis Briggs Jr. DL; 69 Samuel Carson OL; 91 Bryce Carter DL; 41 Brian Cole II LB; 24 Benjamin Dobson LB; 93 Aidan John DL; 31 Jeremy Lucien DB; 92 Daniel Okpoko DL; 52 Zack Pelehos OL; 42 James Peter LB; 49 Jamie Pettway LB; 8 C. J. Reavis DB; 98 Kori Roberson DL; 48 Sione Teuhema DL; 96 Michael Wakefield DL; 14 Bennett Williams DB	**Practice roster**: 47 Josh Connors LB; 66 Christian Coulter OL; 67 Anim Dankwah OL; 86 Grant Dubose WR; 22 Demarquis Gates LB; 39 Kenzel Lawler DB; 46 DaMarcus Mitchell DL; 50 Mahamane Moussa OL; 74 C. J. Nunnally IV DE; 9 Devyn Perkins DB; 35 Ricky Person Jr. DB; 88 Sam Schnee WR; 58 Eric Starczala OL; 80 Binjimen Victor WR; 73 Joey Zelinsky DL; **Suspended**: -- Andy Isabella WR; 65 Nouredin Nouili OL
Italics indicate American player • **Bold** indicates Global player • 45 Active, 2 Reserve, 22 Injured, 15 Practice, 2 Suspended; Roster updated 2026-10-08 • Depth chart • Transactions • More CFL rosters

== Staff ==
Ottawa Redblacks staff
Front office: Owner – Ottawa Sports and Entertainment Group (OSEG); Chief Executive Officer – Mark Goudie; Vice President of Football Operations – Shawn Burke; General manager – Ryan Dinwiddie; Assistant General Manager – Jeremy Snyder; Senior Football Advisor – Jim Popp; Director of Pro Personnel – Brendan Taman; Director of Canadian Scouting & Football Analytics – Chad Hudson; Assistant Director of US Scouting & Football Operations – Philippe Moreau; Senior Personnel Executive – Drew Allemang; Director of Football Operations – Joe Panessidi; Video Coordinator – Braun Gheller; Equipment Manager – Drew McCormick; Head coach: Head coach – Ryan Dinwiddie; Offensive coaches: Offensive Coordinator – Ryan Dinwiddie; Quarterbacks – Drew Tate; Offensive Line – Mike Gibson; Receivers – Pete Costanza; Running Backs – Evan Harrington	Defensive coaches: Defensive Coordinator – Jeff Reinebold; Defensive Line – Phillip Daniels; Linebackers – Damaso Munoz; Defensive Backs – Myron Lewis; Special teams coaches: Special Teams Coordinator – Nate Taylor; Strength and conditioning: Strength and Conditioning Coordinator – Dylan Hines; → Coaching Staff → More CFL staffs

== Awards ==
- Grey Cup
  - Champions (1): 2016
- East Division
  - Champions (3): 2015, 2016, 2018

== Mascot ==
The Redblacks' mascot is a lumberjack whose original name, "Big Joe Mufferaw", was revealed by the team on March 28, 2014. The name, which came from online suggestions, was an acknowledgement to the Big Joe Mufferaw folk legend popularized in several works of fiction (most notably by Ottawa native Bernie Bedore) and in songs by Stompin' Tom Connors. After the Redblacks received some criticism for the Mufferaw name, the team announced on March 31 that the mascot would go by the name "Big Joe" (or "Grand Jos" in French).

== Cheerleaders ==
The Ottawa Redblacks Cheer and Dance Team made its debut at the Redblacks' first home game at TD Place Stadium on July 17, 2014. The team is composed of men and women between the ages of 18 and 35, with two spirit teams of 25 cheerleaders and 25 dancers. The coed cheerleading team consists of athletes from various all-star, varsity, performance, and competitive cheerleading backgrounds. During games, the cheerleading team executes stunt routines and acrobatics on the field and the sidelines. The dance team is composed of females from a variety of dance disciplines. The team also performs on the field during game stoppages and participates in pregame activities. The program directors are Lisa Aucoin and Kenny Feeley, and the dance team's head coach is Melany Morrison.

On game days, members of the cheer and dance teams participate in “gameday cheering/dancing, halftime performances, pregame shows, [and] gameday promotions”. Members are involved in various community events, charity functions and corporate appearances in the Ottawa region.

The team offers a junior program for cheerleaders and dancers between the ages of six and 16. The four-week program includes instruction and coaching by members of the team.

== See also ==
- Ottawa Redblacks all-time records and statistics
- Ottawa Football Clubs all-time records and statistics
- Canadian football
- Comparison of American and Canadian football
- List of Canadian Football League seasons
