= Eric Cumberbatch =

Canadian gridiron football player (born 2002)

No. 15 – Ottawa Redblacks
- Position: Defensive back
- Roster status: Active
- CFL status: National

Personal information
- Born: October 8, 2002 (age 24)
- Listed height: 6 ft 2 in (1.88 m)
- Listed weight: 202 lb (92 kg)

Career information
- High school: Le Relais (North Glengarry, Ontario)
- University: Ottawa (2021–2024)
- CFL draft: 2025: 5th round, 42nd overall pick

Career history
- Ottawa Redblacks (2025–present)

Awards and highlights
- First-team All-Canadian (2023); First-team OUA All-Star (2023); Second-team OUA All-Star (2022)

Career CFL statistics as of 2026
- Total tackles: 13
- Stats at CFL.ca

Eric Cumberbatch (born October 8, 2002) is a Canadian professional football defensive back for the Ottawa Redblacks of the Canadian Football League (CFL). He most recently played for the Ottawa Redblacks of the Canadian Football League (CFL). He played U Sports football at Ottawa.

== Early life ==
Eric Cumberbatch was born on October 8, 2002. He played youth football for the Orleans Minor Football Association in Orleans, Ontario, and for the Cornwall Wildcats of the National Capital Amateur Football Association. For high school, he attended École secondaire catholique Le Relais in Alexandria, Ontario.

== University career ==
Cumberbatch played U Sports football for the Ottawa Gee-Gees of the University of Ottawa from 2021 to 2024. As a true freshman in 2021, he started all six regular season games at defensive halfback, totaling 11 solo tackles, nine assisted tackles, and two pass breakups. He also started both playoff games that year, posting 4.5 tackles in the OUA East Final. Cumberbatch appeared in eight games in 2022, recording 16 solo tackles, 18 assisted tackles, and seven pass breakups, earning second-team OUA all-star honors. He played in eight games for the second straight year in 2023, totaling 23 solo tackles, 19 assisted tackles, two interceptions, four pass breakups, and one sack. For his performance during the 2023 season, he was named a first-team All-Canadian and a first-team OUA all-star. Cumberbatch only played in four games his senior year in 2024, recording seven solo tackles, seven assisted tackles, one interception, two pass breakups, one sack, and one fumble recovery for 57 yards. He majored in human kinetics at Ottawa. He played his last three years at Ottawa with his twin brother Patrick.

== Professional career ==
Pre-draft measurables
Height	Weight	40-yard dash	20-yard shuttle	Three-cone drill	Vertical jump	Broad jump	Bench press
6 ft 2 3/8 in (1.89 m)	202 lb (92 kg)	4.51 s	4.31 s	7.12 s	39.0 in (0.99 m)	11 ft 2 3/8 in (3.41 m)	14 reps
All values from CFL Combine

Cumberbatch attended the 2025 CFL Combine, and had the best broad jump with a jump of eleven feet and two-and-three-eights inches. On April 29, 2025, he was selected by the Ottawa Redblacks in the fifth round, with the 42nd overall pick, of the 2025 CFL draft. He attended rookie minicamp on a tryout basis with New Orleans Saints in May 2025 but was not signed. He then officially signed with the Redblacks on May 11, 2025. He was moved to the practice roster on July 19, and promoted back to the active roster on August 18, 2025. He played in 11 regular season games where he had one defensive tackle and one special teams tackle.

Cumberbatch started the 2026 season on the practice roster. After one game, he was released on June 15, 2026. Cumberbatch was re-signed on July 7.

== Personal life ==
Cumberbatch speaks French.
