= École secondaire catholique Le Relais =

Coordinates: 45.3164°N 74.6362°W

L'École secondaire catholique Le Relais is a French-Language Catholic high school located in Alexandria, Ontario. It is managed by the Conseil scolaire de district catholique de l'Est ontarien.

== Notable alumni ==
- Eric Cumberbatch, CFL player

== See also ==
- Education in Ontario
- List of secondary schools in Ontario
