= Jelani Stafford =

American gridiron football player (born 2000)

No. 97 – Ottawa Redblacks
- Position: Defensive lineman
- Roster status: Active
- CFL status: American

Personal information
- Born: December 5, 2000 (age 25)
- Listed height: 5 ft 11 in (1.80 m)
- Listed weight: 292 lb (132 kg)

Career information
- High school: California (California, Pennsylvania)
- College: Youngstown State (2019–2021); UConn (2022–2024)
- NFL draft: 2025: undrafted

Career history
- Ottawa Redblacks (2026–present)
- Stats at CFL.ca

Jelani Stafford (born December 5, 2000) is an American professional football defensive lineman for the Ottawa Redblacks of the Canadian Football League (CFL). He played college football for the Youngstown State Penguins and UConn Huskies.

== Early life ==
Stafford was born on December 5, 2000. He attended California High School in California, Pennsylvania, where he played at running back and defensive tackle, rushing for more than 1,000 yards as a senior.

== College career ==
Stafford played college football for the Youngstown State Penguins from 2019 to 2021 and UConn Huskies from 2022 to 2024. In 16 games at Youngstown State, he had 14 tackles, including two for loss and one forced fumble. After the 2021 season ended, Stafford entered the transfer portal. He eventually committed to UConn.

Stafford played in 13 games in his first season, logging 28 tackles, including three for loss and two sacks. The following year, he had 40 tackles, with right for loss, 0.5 sack, two pass deflections and fumble recoveries. Stafford also played at fullback, where he had five carries for 11 yards and two touchdowns and caught a pass for 10 yards against Utah State. He finished 2023 with 22 rushing yards and six touchdowns on offense. As a senior, Stafford played solely on the defensive line, recording 39 tackles, including 5.5 for loss and a pass deflection.

== Professional career ==
After going unselected in the 2025 NFL draft, Stafford signed with the Ottawa Redblacks of the Canadian Football League (CFL) as an undrafted free agent. On May 31, 2026, he was assigned to the practice roster. On July 2, Stafford was elevated to the active roster and made his CFL debut the following day against the Saskatchewan Roughriders. He was named the team's nominee for the Most Outstanding Rookie award.
