= Travian Blaylock =

American football player (born 1999)

Ottawa Redblacks
- Position: Defensive back
- Roster status: Practice roster
- CFL status: American

Personal information
- Born: September 3, 1999 (age 27); Humble, Texas, U.S.
- Listed height: 5 ft 11 in (1.80 m)
- Listed weight: 197 lb (89 kg)

Career information
- High school: Atascocita (Humble)
- College: Wisconsin
- NFL draft: 2024: undrafted

Career history
- 2025: BC Lions
- 2026: Edmonton Elks*
- 2026–present: Ottawa Redblacks*
- * Offseason or practice squad member only
- Stats at CFL.ca

Travian Blaylock (born September 3, 1999) is an American professional football defensive back for the Ottawa Redblacks of the Canadian Football League (CFL). Blaylock played college football for the Wisconsin Badgers.

== College career ==
Blaylock played college football for the Wisconsin Badgers from 2018 to 2023. He played in 35 games, recording 26 tackles, 0.5 sack, one pass deflection and two fumble recoveries. He missed the 2022 season due to an ACL tear that was sustained during spring practice.

== Professional career ==
Pre-draft measurables
Height	Weight	Arm length	Hand span	40-yard dash	10-yard split	20-yard split	20-yard shuttle	Three-cone drill	Vertical jump	Broad jump	Bench press
5 ft 11 in (1.80 m)	197 lb (89 kg)	31 1/2 in (0.80 m)	9 1/4 in (0.23 m)	4.50 s	1.62 s	2.65 s	4.41 s	6.81 s	39 in (0.99 m)	11 ft 0 in (3.35 m)	15 reps
All values from Pro Day

=== BC Lions ===
On April 22, 2025, it was announced that the BC Lions signed Blaylock. On June 25, he was waived but was then signed to practice roster on July 1. Blaylock made his CFL debut on July 27 against the Hamilton Tiger-Cats, starting in place of the injured Jalon Edwards-Cooper. On August 4, 2025, Blaylock was reassigned to the practice roster, where he spent the remainder of the 2025 CFL season until he was released on October 31, 2025.

=== Edmonton Elks ===
Blaylock signed with the CFL's Edmonton Elks on January 23, 2026. He was released on May 31 as part of final roster cuts.

=== Ottawa Redblacks ===
On August 17, 2026, Blaylock signed with the Ottawa Redblacks.

== Personal life ==
Blaylock's father Derrick, played in the National Football League from 2001 to 2007 for the Kansas City Chiefs and New York Jets. He has two brothers, Taylen, who plays at Furman and Tory who plays at Oklahoma. Blaylock has two children with his wife, Tatiana.
