= Dionté Ruffin =

American gridiron football player (born 1999)

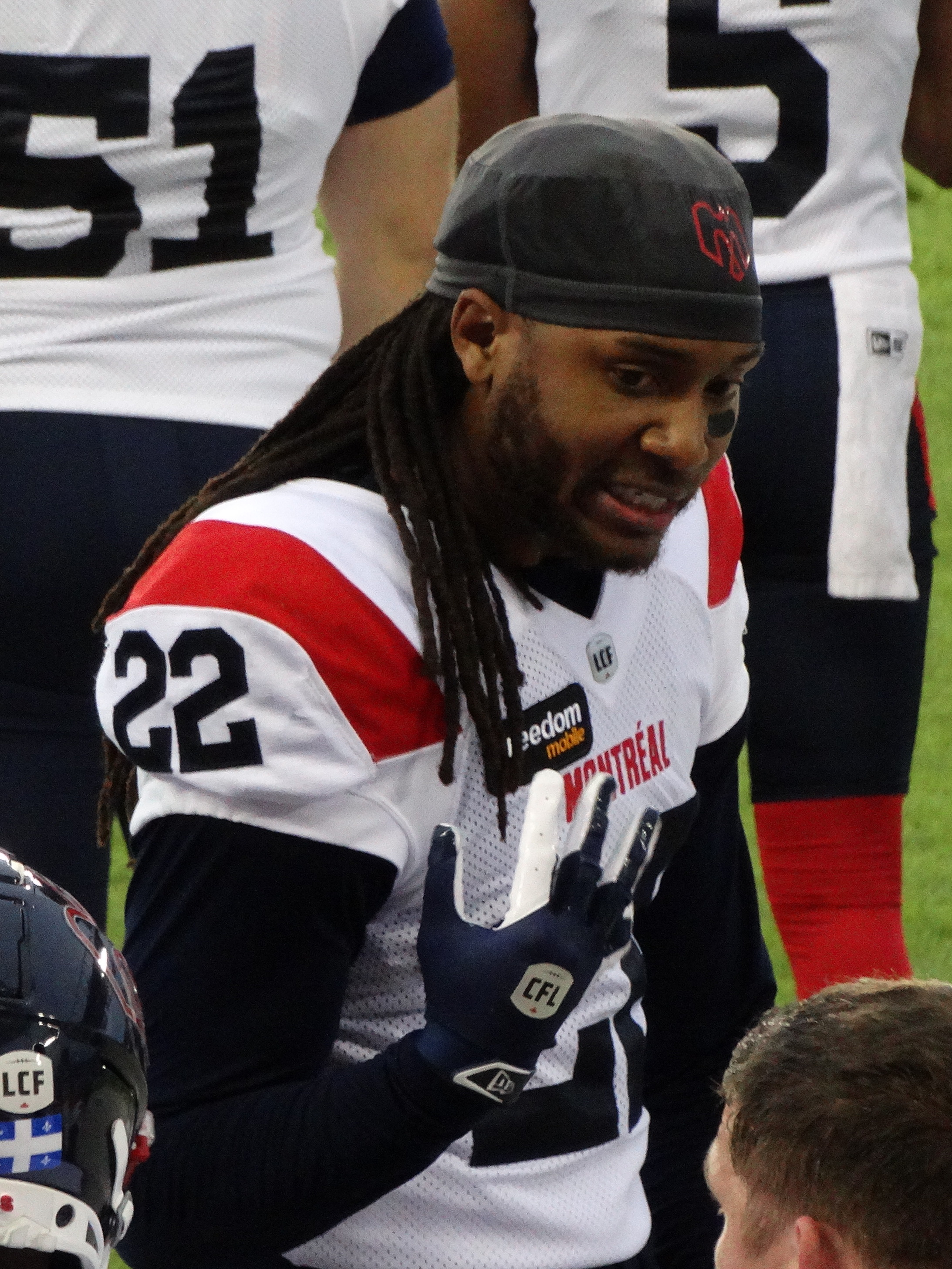
- Ruffin with the Montreal Alouettes in 2024

Ottawa Redblacks
- Position: Defensive back
- Roster status: Active
- CFL status: American

Personal information
- Born: January 29, 1999 (age 27); Kenner, Louisiana, U. S.
- Listed height: 5 ft 10 in (1.78 m)
- Listed weight: 177 lb (80 kg)

Career information
- High school: Paulding County High
- College: Western Kentucky (2017–2020)

Career history
- 2021: Chicago Bears*
- 2022: Calgary Stampeders
- 2023–2026: Montreal Alouettes
- 2026: BC Lions*
- 2026–present: Ottawa Redblacks
- * Offseason or practice squad member only

Awards and highlights
- Grey Cup champion (2023)
- Stats at CFL.ca

Dionté Ruffin (born January 29, 1999) is an American professional football defensive back for the Ottawa Redblacks of the Canadian Football League (CFL).

== College career ==
Ruffin played college football for the Western Kentucky Hilltoppers from 2017 to 2020.

== Professional career ==
=== Chicago Bears ===
On May 13, 2021, Ruffin signed with the Chicago Bears as an undrafted free agent. However, he was released with the final roster cuts on August 31, 2021.

=== Calgary Stampeders ===
On February 1, 2022, it was announced that Ruffin had signed with the Calgary Stampeders. In 2022, he played and started in nine regular season games where he had 39 defensive tackles and one interception. He was released on September 30, 2022.

=== Montreal Alouettes ===
Ruffin signed with the Montreal Alouettes on December 12, 2022. He was an opening day starter with the team in 2023, but also spent time on the injured list, as he played and started in 11 regular season games where he recorded 23 defensive tackles, two forced fumbles, and one fumble recovery. He also played in both playoff games that year as the team advanced to the 110th Grey Cup.

He was released on January 5, 2026.

=== BC Lions ===
On February 13, 2026, Ruffin signed a two-year contract with the BC Lions. On May 31, 2026, Ruffin was released by Lions, during their final cuts before the start of the 2026 CFL season.

=== Ottawa Redblacks ===
On July 14, 2026, Ruffin signed with the Ottawa Redblacks.
