= Lucus Spencer =

Canadian gridiron football player (born 2001)

No. 59 – Ottawa Redblacks
- Position: Long snapper
- Roster status: Active
- CFL status: National

Personal information
- Born: February 16, 2001 (age 25)
- Listed height: 6 ft 2 in (1.88 m)
- Listed weight: 207 lb (94 kg)

Career information
- High school: Kelowna (Kelowna, British Columbia)
- CJFL: Okanagan Sun
- University: Bishop's (2020–2024)
- CFL draft: 2025: undrafted

Career history
- Montreal Alouettes (2026)*; Ottawa Redblacks (2026–present)
- * Offseason or practice squad member only
- Stats at CFL.ca

Lucus Spencer (born February 16, 2001) is a Canadian professional football long snapper for the Ottawa Redblacks of the Canadian Football League (CFL). He played U Sports football for the Bishop's Gaiters .

== Junior career ==
Spencer played in the Canadian Junior Football League (CJFL) for the Okanagan Sun. He played in six games, recording seven tackles.

== University career ==
Spencer played U Sports football for the Bishop's Gaiters from 2020 to 2024. He served as the team's long snapper and as a defensive lineman. In 30 games, Spencer made 16 tackles, including 0.5 for loss.

== Professional career ==
=== Montreal Alouettes ===
After not being selected in the 2025 CFL draft, Spencer signed with the Montreal Alouettes of the Canadian Football League (CFL) as an undrafted free agent on May 10, 2026. On May 31, he was released by the team.

=== Ottawa Redblacks ===
On August 10, 2026, Spencer was signed by the Ottawa Redblacks. He made his CFL debut on August 14 against the Winnipeg Blue Bombers, registering two tackles.
