= King Ambers =

Canadian football player (born 1999)

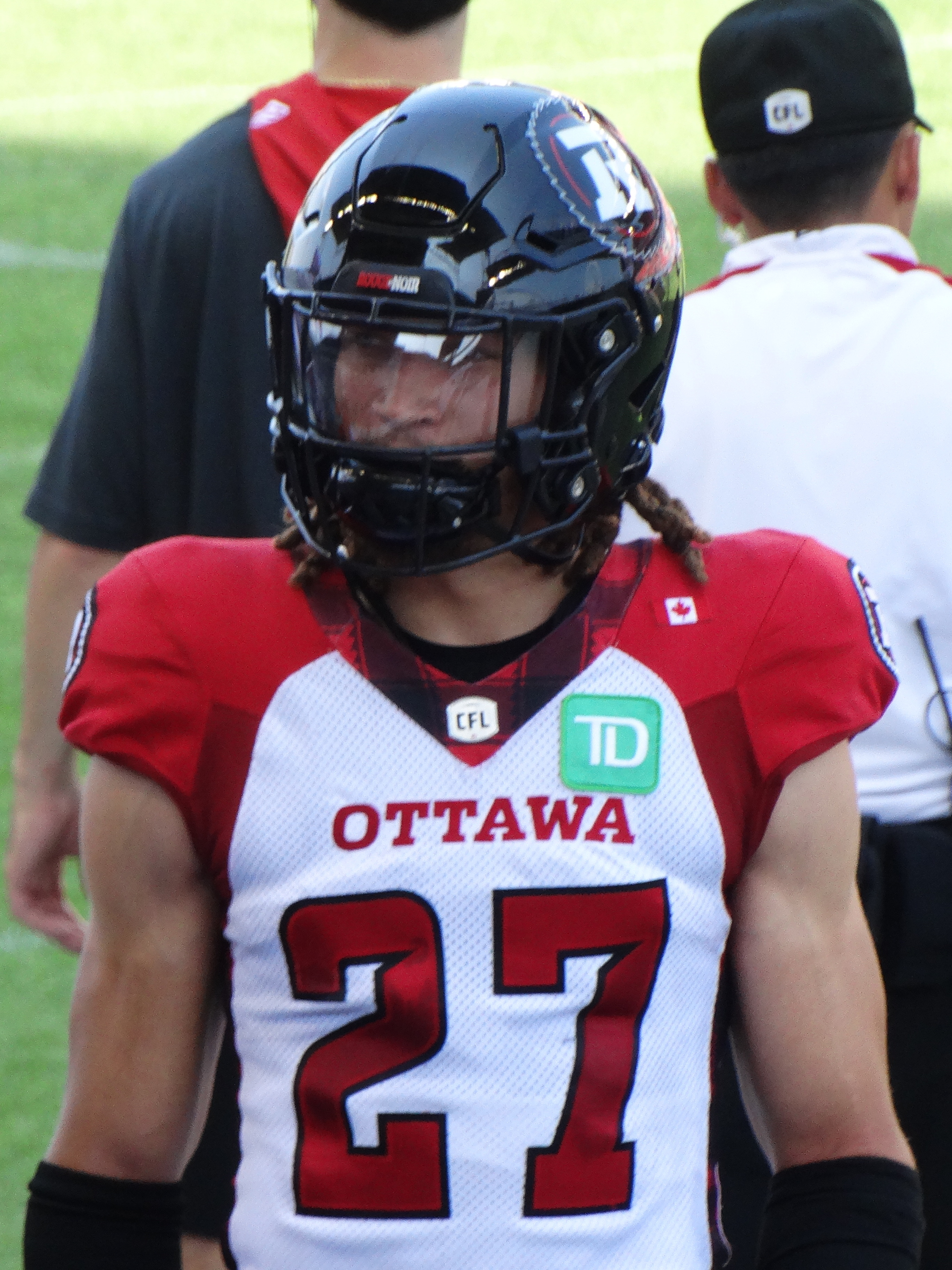
- Ambers with the Ottawa Redblacks in 2025

No. 27 – Ottawa Redblacks
- Position: Defensive back
- Roster status: Active
- CFL status: National

Personal information
- Born: November 26, 1999 (age 26); Pickering, Ontario, Canada
- Listed height: 6 ft 2 in (1.88 m)
- Listed weight: 191 lb (87 kg)

Career information
- High school: West Toronto Prep Academy (Toronto, Ontario)
- College: New Mexico Military Institute (2019); East Texas A&M (2020–2024)
- CFL draft: 2025: 8th round, 68th overall pick

Career history
- Ottawa Redblacks (2025–present)

Career CFL statistics as of 2026
- Total tackles: 31
- Fumble recoveries: 1
- Pass knockdowns: 4
- Interceptions: 3
- Stats at CFL.ca

King Ambers (born November 26, 1999) is a Canadian professional football defensive back for the Ottawa Redblacks of the Canadian Football League (CFL). He played college football for the New Mexico Military Broncos and the East Texas A&M Lions.

== College career ==
Ambers played college football for the New Mexico Military Broncos (NMMI) in 2019 and the East Texas A&M Lions from 2020 to 2024. He played in 10 games at NMMI, registering nine tackles, three pass deflections and two interceptions. Ambers then played in 37 games for East Texas A&M, recording 59 tackles, including 4.5 tackles for loss, seven pass deflections, three interceptions, and one forced fumble.

== Professional career ==
Pre-draft measurables
Height	Weight	20-yard shuttle	Three-cone drill	Vertical jump	Broad jump
6 ft 1 3/4 in (1.87 m)	191 lb (87 kg)	4.27 s	6.96 s	35.0 in (0.89 m)	10 ft 7 3/8 in (3.24 m)
All values from CFL Combine

Ambers was selected in the 68th pick of the eighth round in the 2025 CFL draft by the Ottawa Redblacks. He officially signed with the team on May 5, 2025 before being placed onto the practice roster on June 1. He was activated on July 11, 2025 and appeared in his first CFL game against the Hamilton Tiger-Cats. On August 15, 2025, Ambers recorded his first career interception, picking off Winnipeg Blue Bombers quarterback Zach Collaros.
