= Kori Roberson =

American football player (born 2001)

No. 93 – Ottawa Redblacks
- Position: Defensive lineman
- Roster status: Active
- CFL status: American

Personal information
- Born: February 5, 2001 (age 25)
- Listed height: 6 ft 3 in (1.91 m)
- Listed weight: 308 lb (140 kg)

Career information
- High school: Manvel (Manvel, Texas)
- College: Oklahoma (2019–2022); SMU (2023–2024)
- NFL draft: 2025: undrafted

Career history
- Montreal Alouettes (2025–2026); Ottawa Redblacks (2026–present)
- Stats at CFL.ca

Kori Roberson Jr. (born February 5, 2001) is an American professional football defensive lineman for the Ottawa Redblacks of the Canadian Football League (CFL). He played college football at Oklahoma and SMU.

== Early life ==
Kori Roberson Jr. was born on February 5, 2001. He played high school football at Manvel High School in Manvel, Texas. He was rated a four-star recruit by ESPN.com and a three-star recruit by both 247Sports.com and Rivals.com.

== College career ==
Roberson first played college football for the Oklahoma Sooners of the University of Oklahoma. As a true freshman in 2019, he played in four games as a backup and posted one solo tackle before being redshirted. After missing the 2020 season opener, he played in the remaining ten games (starting four) during the COVID-19 shortened 2020 season, recording four solo tackles, seven assisted tackles, one sack, and one pass breakup. Roberson appeared in all 13 games as a backup nose guard in 2021, totaling five solo tackles, 12 assisted tackles, and 0.5 sacks. He did not appear in any games during the 2022 season. He majored in communication at Oklahoma.

On May 16, 2023, Roberson announced that he was transferring to Arizona State. However, on May 25, 2023, he switched his commitment to Southern Methodist University, returning to his home state of Texas. He played in 13 games for the SMU Mustangs during the 2023 season, recording 16 solo tackles, 13 assisted tackles, three sacks, one pass breakup, and one interception that he returned 16 yards for a touchdown in the season opener. Roberson appeared in 13 games in 2024, totaling 10 solo tackles, 14 assisted tackles, one sack, one interception, and three pass breakups, earning honorable mention All-Atlantic Coast Conference honors. SMU finished the 2024 season ranked 12th in the AP poll.

== Professional career ==
Pre-draft measurables
Height	Weight
6 ft 3 1/4 in (1.91 m)	303 lb (137 kg)
Values from Pro Day

=== Montreal Alouettes ===
After going undrafted in the 2025 NFL draft, Roberson signed with the Montreal Alouettes of the Canadian Football League on May 18, 2025. He was moved to the practice roster on June 1, promoted to the active roster on June 26, moved back to the practice roster on July 31, promoted to the active roster again on August 2, and moved back to the practice roster again on August 12, 2025.

On June 29, 2026, Roberson was released by the Alouettes.

=== Ottawa Redblacks ===
On September 7, 2026, Roberson signed with the Ottawa Redblacks.

== Personal life ==
On February 26, 2023, Roberson's home in Norman, Oklahoma, was severely damaged by a tornado. Roberson said the only things that did not get damaged were his phone and a PlayStation 5.
