= Sione Teuhema =

American gridiron football player (born 1995)

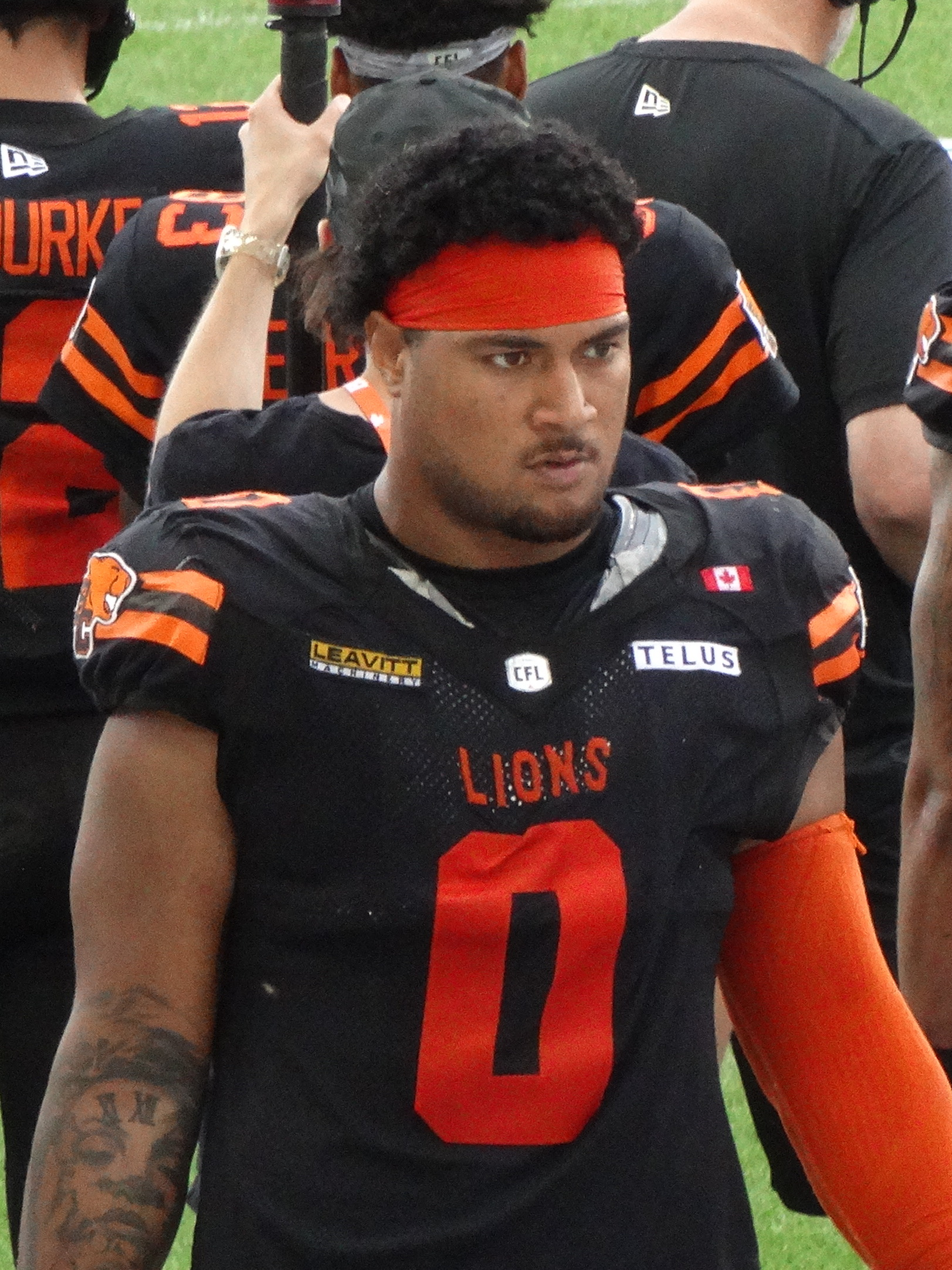
- Teuhema with the BC Lions in 2025

Ottawa Redblacks
- Position: Defensive lineman
- CFL status: American

Personal information
- Born: September 28, 1995 (age 31); Keller, Texas, U.S.
- Listed height: 6 ft 4 in (1.93 m)
- Listed weight: 245 lb (111 kg)

Career information
- High school: Keller High
- College: Louisiana State; Southeastern Louisiana

Career history
- 2019: Arizona Hotshots
- 2019–2020: Carolina Panthers*
- 2021: Frisco Fighters
- 2022–2026: BC Lions
- 2026–present: Ottawa Redblacks
- * Offseason or practice squad member only
- Stats at Pro Football Reference
- Stats at CFL.ca

Sione Teuhema (born September 28, 1995) is an American professional football defensive lineman for the Ottawa Redblacks of the Canadian Football League (CFL). He played college football for the Louisiana State Tigers and the Southeastern Louisiana Lions.

== College career ==
Teuhema played college football for the LSU Tigers from 2014 to 2015. He played in 16 games where he had 20 tackles and two sacks. He was suspended by the team in May 2016 and transferred to Southeastern Louisiana University to play for the Lions that year. He played for the Lions from 2016 to 2017 where he had 109 tackles, 13 sacks, and three forced fumbles.

== Professional career ==
Pre-draft measurables
Height	Weight	Arm length	Hand span	Wingspan	40-yard dash	10-yard split	20-yard split	20-yard shuttle	Three-cone drill	Vertical jump	Broad jump	Bench press
6 ft 4 in (1.93 m)	241 lb (109 kg)	32 5/8 in (0.83 m)	9 3/8 in (0.24 m)	6 ft 6 1/2 in (1.99 m)	4.78 s	1.68 s	2.82 s	4.41 s	7.18 s	32.5 in (0.83 m)	9 ft 9 in (2.97 m)	15 reps
All values from Pro Day

=== Arizona Hotshots ===
After going undrafted in the 2018 NFL draft, Teuhema attended minicamp with the Chicago Bears and New York Jets, but was not signed. He didn't play in 2018, and then signed with the Arizona Hotshots for the 2019 season. That year, he recorded 13 tackles, one sack, and one forced fumble before the league folded during the season.

=== Carolina Panthers ===
Teuhema signed with the Carolina Panthers on June 11, 2019. However, he was released at the end of training camp on September 2, 2017. He spent the 2019 season on the practice roster and was signed to a futures contract for 2020. However, he was waived on May 29, 2020, to make room on the roster for Eli Apple.

=== Frisco Fighters ===
In 2021, Teuhema played for the Frisco Fighters where he had nine total tackles and one sack.

=== BC Lions ===
On February 28, 2022, Teuhema signed with the BC Lions. He made the team's active roster following training camp and played in his first CFL game on June 16, 2022, against the Edmonton Elks, where he had four defensive tackles and three sacks. He finished the 2022 season having played in 14 regular season games, starting in four, where he had 23 defensive tackles, four special teams tackles, and eight sacks.

In 2023, Teuhema became a regular starter, playing and starting in 17 regular season games where he had 37 defensive tackles, seven sacks, and two fumble recoveries.

On December 10, 2024, Teuhema was suspended for two games by the CFL violating its joint drug policy with the Canadian Football League Players' Association, after he tested positive for the banned substance Amphetamine.

On June 6, 2025, Teuhema was again suspended by the CFL. On June 19, 2025, Teuhema's suspension was lifted and he rejoined the active roster.

On August 28, 2025, Teuhema was placed on the Lions' 6-game injured list, where he spent the remainder of the 2025 CFL season.

On January 2, 2026, Teuhema re-signed with the Lions, on a one-year contract extension. On June 22, Teuhema was released by the Lions.

=== Ottawa Redblacks ===
On August 11, 2026, Teuhama signed with the Ottawa Redblacks.

== Personal life ==
Teuhema was born to parents Sidney and Liliani Teuhema. His younger brother, Maea, played as an offensive lineman with both the LSU Tigers and Southeastern Louisiana Lions. On February 23, 2024, Maea signed with the BC Lions, joining Sione. Maea was, however, released by Lions prior to the start of the 2024 CFL season, while Sione remained with the team.
