= Noah Gettman =

American football player (born 2000)

No. 33 – Ottawa Redblacks
- Position: Punter
- Roster status: Active
- CFL status: American

Personal information
- Born: September 19, 2000 (age 26)
- Listed height: 6 ft 5 in (1.96 m)
- Listed weight: 202 lb (92 kg)

Career information
- High school: Mainland (Daytona Beach, Florida)
- College: Sacred Heart (2018–2021); Akron (2022)
- NFL draft: 2023: undrafted

Career history
- Edmonton Elks (2023)*; Ottawa Redblacks (2024–present)
- * Offseason or practice squad member only

Awards and highlights
- First-team All-NEC (2021)
- Stats at CFL.ca

Noah Gettman (born September 19, 2000) is an American professional football punter for the Ottawa Redblacks of the Canadian Football League (CFL). He played college football for the Sacred Heart Pioneers and the Akron Zips.

== College career ==
Gettman played college football for the Sacred Heart Pioneers from 2018 to 2021 and the Akron Zips in 2022. He played four years for the Pioneers where in 40 games, he kicked for 7,968 yards and averaged 39.4 yards per boot. In the 2021 Northeast Conference Football Championship Game, Gettman set multiple program records with a 56.7 yards per punt average and an 82-yard punt, which is the second-longest punt in conference history. For his efforts, he was named National Special Teams Player of the Week. Gettman was named to the All-NEC first team in 2020–21 and second-team All-American by the American Football Coaches Association.

Gettman transferred to University of Akron to finish his college career. He punted 61 times for 2,478 yards and 40.6 average.

== Professional career ==
=== Edmonton Elks ===
After not being selected in the 2023 NFL draft, Gettman signed with the Edmonton Elks of the Canadian Football League (CFL) as an undrafted free agent. He was released on May 13, 2023.

=== Ottawa Redblacks ===
On November 25, 2024, Gettman signed with the Ottawa Redblacks of the CFL. He was waived on June 1, 2025 as part of final roster cut downs. Gettman was re-signed by the team on September 17, 2025. He made his professional debut on September 20, against the Winnipeg Blue Bombers. Gettman punted six times for 305 yards for an average of 50.8 and a single. He was released again on September 22 before re-signing on November 27, 2025.
