= DaMarcus Mitchell =

American football player (born 1998)

No. 0 – Ottawa Redblacks
- Position: Defensive tackle
- Roster status: Active
- CFL status: American

Personal information
- Born: December 13, 1998 (age 27); Thibodaux, Louisiana, U.S.
- Listed height: 6 ft 3 in (1.91 m)
- Listed weight: 256 lb (116 kg)

Career information
- High school: Thibodaux
- College: Southwest Mississippi CC (2018–2019); Purdue (2020–2021)
- NFL draft: 2022: undrafted

Career history
- New England Patriots (2022); Seattle Seahawks (2023)*; Birmingham Stallions (2024); Memphis Showboats (2025); Dallas Renegades (2026); Ottawa Redblacks (2026–present)
- * Offseason or practice squad member only

Awards and highlights
- UFL champion (2024)

Career NFL statistics
- Tackles: 3
- Stats at Pro Football Reference

DaMarcus Mitchell (born December 13, 1998) is an American professional football defensive tackle for the Ottawa Redblacks of the Canadian Football League (CFL). He played college football for the Southwest Mississippi Bears and Purdue Boilermakers. Mitchell was signed as an undrafted free agent by the New England Patriots in 2022. He has also played for the Birmingham Stallions, Memphis Showboats, and Dallas Renegades.

== College career ==
Mitchell committed to Southwest Mississippi Community College out of high school, recording 12 carries for 57 yards as a freshman. He moved to linebacker in his sophomore season for the Bears, recording 71 tackles. In 2020, he was rated a three-star transfer recruit by 247Sports, choosing to transfer to Purdue. He started five games for the Boilermakers, finishing third on the team with 34 tackles and one sack. He recorded 25 tackles and 4.5 sacks in 2021, including four tackles, a sack, and a forced fumble against Tennessee in the 2021 Music City Bowl. After the season, he declared for the 2022 NFL draft.

== Professional career ==
Pre-draft measurables
| Height | Weight | Arm length | Hand span | Wingspan | 20-yard shuttle | Three-cone drill | Vertical jump | Broad jump | Bench press |
|---|---|---|---|---|---|---|---|---|---|
| 6 ft 2 3/4 in (1.90 m) | 260 lb (118 kg) | 32 1/4 in (0.82 m) | 10 1/8 in (0.26 m) | 6 ft 6 1/2 in (1.99 m) | 4.38 s | 7.46 s | 34.0 in (0.86 m) | 10 ft 5 in (3.18 m) | 17 reps |
All values from Pro Day

=== New England Patriots ===
Mitchell signed with the New England Patriots as an undrafted free agent on April 30, 2022. He made the team's 53-man roster out of training camp.

On August 15, 2023, Mitchell was waived by the Patriots.

=== Seattle Seahawks ===
On August 20, 2023, Mitchell was signed by the Seattle Seahawks, but was waived two days later.

=== Birmingham Stallions ===
On December 22, 2023, Mitchell signed with the Birmingham Stallions of the United States Football League (USFL). He re-signed with the team on August 27, 2024. He was waived on January 27, 2025.

=== Memphis Showboats ===
On January 30, 2025, Mitchell signed with the Memphis Showboats of the United Football League (UFL). He was released on May 19.

=== Dallas Renegades ===
On January 13, 2026, Mitchell was selected by the Dallas Renegades in the 2026 UFL draft.

=== Ottawa Redblacks ===
On October 5, 2026, Mitchell signed with the Ottawa Redblacks of the Canadian Football League (CFL). Following the conclusion of the CFL regular season, Mitchell signed a future contract with the Redblacks.
