= Jeremy Lucien =

American football player (born 2000)

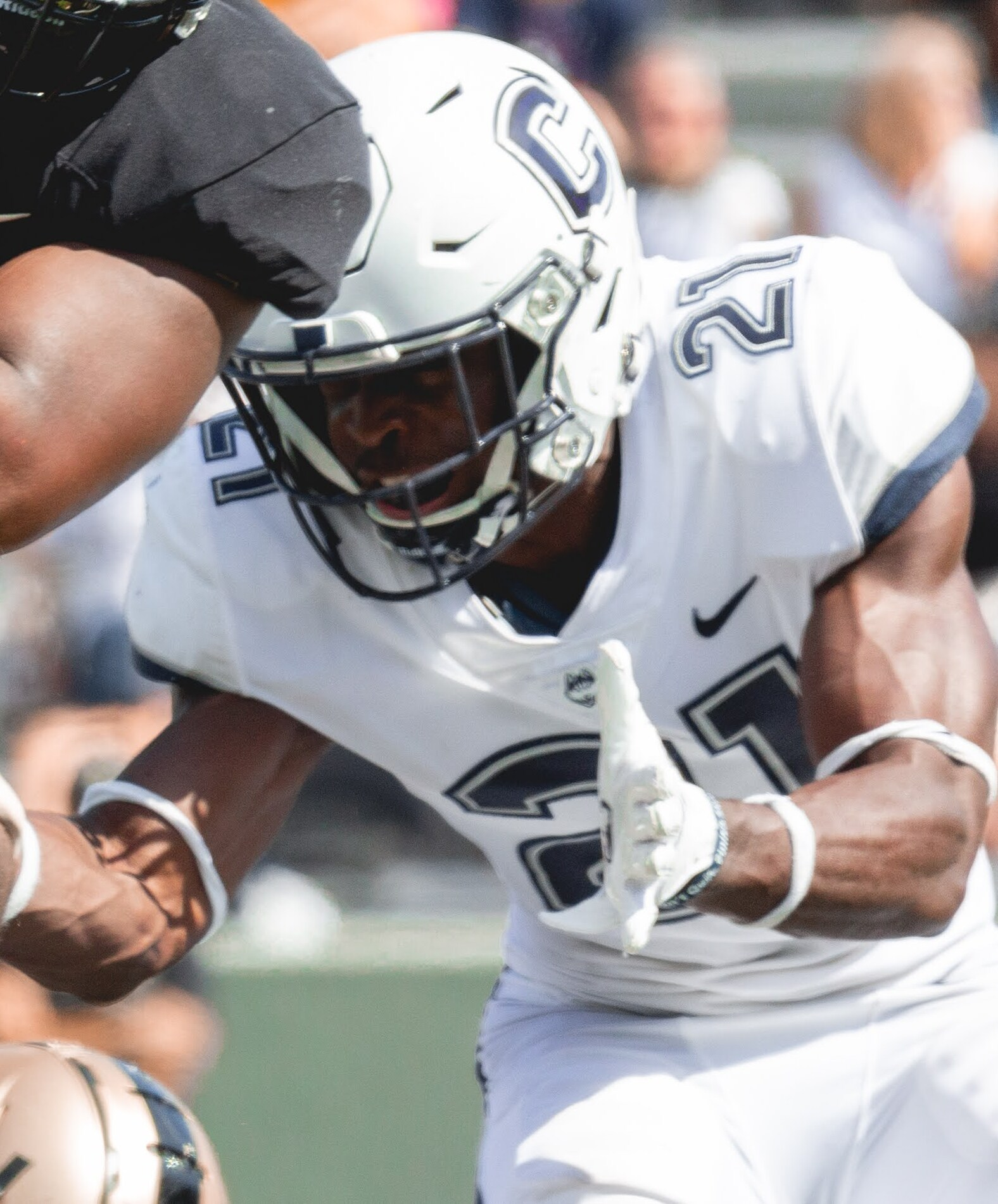
- Lucien with UConn in 2021

No. 31 – Ottawa Redblacks
- Position: Cornerback
- Roster status: Active
- CFL status: American

Personal information
- Born: May 12, 2000 (age 26); Moore Township, Pennsylvania, U.S.
- Listed height: 6 ft 1 in (1.85 m)
- Listed weight: 197 lb (89 kg)

Career information
- High school: Choate Rosemary Hall (Wallingford, Connecticut)
- College: UConn (2018–2021); Vanderbilt (2022)
- NFL draft: 2023: undrafted

Career history
- Baltimore Ravens (2023)*; Calgary Stampeders (2025)*; Ottawa Redblacks (2026–present)
- * Offseason or practice squad member only
- Stats at Pro Football Reference
- Stats at CFL.ca

Jeremy Lucien (born May 12, 2000) is an American professional football cornerback for the Ottawa Redblacks of the Canadian Football League (CFL). He played college football at UConn and Vanderbilt.

== Early life ==
Lucien grew up in Moore Township, Pennsylvania and attended Choate Rosemary Hall. During his sophomore year, he spent three months in Spain for an immersion program. He was a two-star rated recruit and committed to play college football at the University of Connecticut.

== College career ==
=== UConn ===
During Lucien's true freshman season in 2018, he played in nine games and started four of them, finishing the season with 12 recorded tackles (six solo and six assisted) and two pass breakups. During the 2019 season, he played in 11 games and started one of them, finishing the season with 16 total tackles (nine solo and seven assisted), one pass breakup and a forced fumble. During the 2021 season, he played in and started nine games, finishing the season with 29 total tackles (23 solo and six assisted), one tackle for loss for one yard, two interceptions and six pass breakups.

On November 29, 2021, Lucien announced that he would be entering the transfer portal. On January 30, 2022, he announced that he would be transferring to Vanderbilt.

=== Vanderbilt ===
During the 2022 season, he played in all 12 games and started seven of them, finishing the season with 48 total tackles (33 solo and 15 assisted), two tackles for loss and five pass breakups.

== Professional career ==
Pre-draft measurables
Height	Weight	Arm length	Hand span	Wingspan	40-yard dash	10-yard split	20-yard split	20-yard shuttle	Three-cone drill	Vertical jump	Broad jump	Bench press
6 ft 0 1/4 in (1.84 m)	199 lb (90 kg)	31 1/4 in (0.79 m)	9 1/8 in (0.23 m)	6 ft 5 5/8 in (1.97 m)	4.70 s	1.61 s	2.68 s	4.22 s	7.03 s	37.0 in (0.94 m)	10 ft 3 in (3.12 m)	15 reps
All values from Pro Day

=== Baltimore Ravens ===
On April 29, 2023, Lucien was signed to the Baltimore Ravens as an undrafted free agent after going unselected in the 2023 NFL draft. He was waived by the Ravens on August 29, but was re–signed to the practice squad the following day. Lucien was released by the Ravens on December 7.

=== Calgary Stampeders ===
On January 23, 2025, Lucien signed with the Calgary Stampeders of the Canadian Football League (CFL). He was part of the Stampeders' final roster cuts on June 1.

=== Ottawa Redblacks ===
Lucien was signed by the Ottawa Redblacks on January 28, 2026.
