= Keelan White =

Canadian gridiron football player (born 2001)

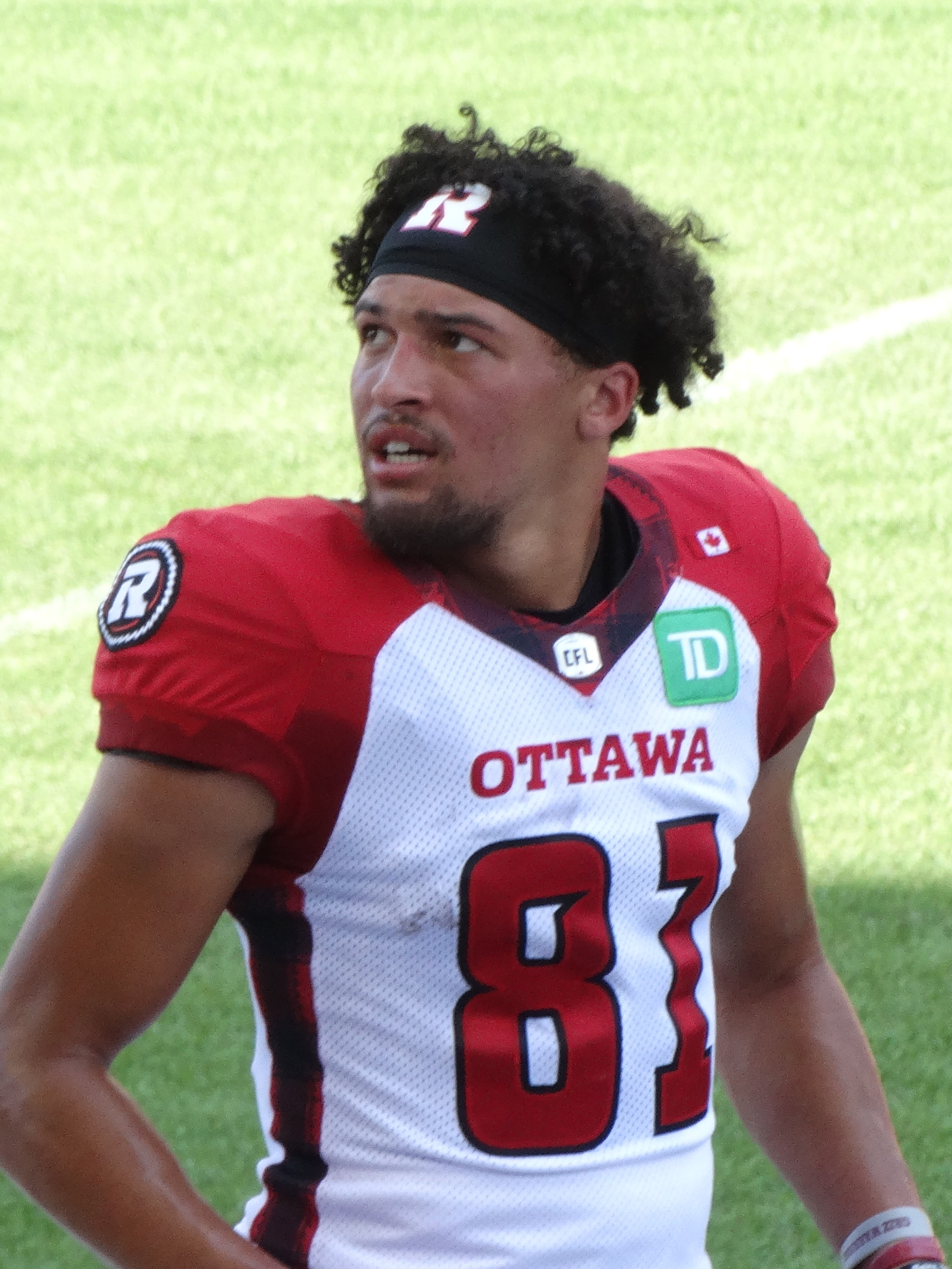
- White with the Ottawa Redblacks in 2025

No. 81 – Ottawa Redblacks
- Position: Wide receiver
- Roster status: Active
- CFL status: National

Personal information
- Born: October 3, 2001 (age 25); North Vancouver, BC
- Listed height: 6 ft 0 in (1.83 m)
- Listed weight: 190 lb (86 kg)

Career information
- High school: Handsworth Secondary (North Vancouver, BC)
- College: Montana (2019–2024)
- CFL draft: 2025: 1st round, 3rd overall pick

Career history
- Ottawa Redblacks (2025–present)

Awards and highlights
- Second-team All-Big Sky (2024)

Career CFL statistics as of 2026
- Receptions: 129
- Receiving yards: 1,440
- Receiving touchdowns: 9
- Stats at CFL.ca

Keelan White (born October 3, 2001) is a Canadian professional football wide receiver for the Ottawa Redblacks of the Canadian Football League (CFL). White previously played college football for the Montana Grizzlies.

== Early life ==
White was born on October 3, 2001. He was a member of U16 and U18 Team Canada squads that competed in the United States. White was a two-star recruit out of high school before enrolling at the University of Montana.

== College career ==
White played college football for the Montana Grizzlies from 2019 to 2024. He walked-on to the team as a freshman before going on scholarship in 2020. White played in three games as a true freshman but would see more playing time the following year, recording 22 receptions for 156 yards. In 2022, he played in all 13 games and started in 12, scoring five touchdowns and 237 receiving yards on 23 catches.

In 2023, against Sacramento State, White scored a 97-yard touchdown from quarterback, Clifton McDowell, setting a school record for the longest play from scrimmage and touchdown in school history. He was named the team's Offensive MVP for the 2023 season. In his final year, White had 57 receptions for 628 yards and four touchdowns, leading the team in those categories. He earned second-team All-Big Sky honors and was an honorable mention for the Jon Cornish Trophy for the most outstanding Canadian student-athlete in NCAA football.

=== Statistics ===
College statistics
Season	Team	Games		Receiving				Rushing			
Season	Team	GP	GS	Rec	Yds	Lng	TD	Att	Yds	Lng	TD
2019	Montana	3	0	1	5	5	0	0	0	0	0
2020–21	Montana	2	0	4	38	17	1	0	0	0	0
2021	Montana	11	1	22	156	19	0	1	-11	0	0
2022	Montana	13	12	23	237	36	5	0	0	0	0
2023	Montana	15	15	54	798	97	4	0	0	0	0
2024	Montana	13	13	57	628	26	4	0	0	0	0
Career		57	41	161	1,862	97	14	1	-11	0	0

== Professional career ==
Pre-draft measurables
Height	Weight	Arm length	Hand span	Wingspan	40-yard dash	10-yard split	20-yard split	20-yard shuttle	Three-cone drill	Vertical jump	Broad jump	Bench press
6 ft 0 1/4 in (1.84 m)	190 lb (86 kg)	30 7/8 in (0.78 m)	9 3/8 in (0.24 m)	6 ft 3 1/4 in (1.91 m)	4.60 s	1.65 s	2.76 s	4.10 s	6.78 s	32.5 in (0.83 m)	9 ft 9 in (2.97 m)	12 reps
All values from Pro Day

Entering the 2025 CFL draft, White was ranked as the fifth best prospect by the CFL Scouting Bureau. He was then drafted in the first round, third overall, by the Ottawa Redblacks and signed with the team on May 8, 2025. White made his professional debut against the Saskatchewan Roughriders on June 6, catching four passes for 41 yards. He recorded his first touchdown on July 12 against the Hamilton Tiger-Cats.

== Personal life ==
White's father, Richard, played two seasons in the CFL with the Saskatchewan Roughriders and BC Lions.
