= Kahzir Brown =

American gridiron football player (born 2003)

No. 10 – Ottawa Redblacks
- Position: Defensive back
- Roster status: Active
- CFL status: American

Personal information
- Born: January 26, 2003 (age 23)
- Listed height: 6 ft 2 in (1.88 m)
- Listed weight: 223 lb (101 kg)

Career information
- High school: Trenton Central (Trenton, New Jersey)
- College: Maine (2021–2023); Florida Atlantic (2024)
- NFL draft: 2025: undrafted

Career history
- Green Bay Packers (2025)*; Montreal Alouettes (2026)*; Ottawa Redblacks (2026–present)
- * Offseason or practice squad member only
- Stats at CFL.ca

Kahzir "Buggs" Brown (born January 26, 2003) is an American professional football defensive back for the Ottawa Redblacks of the Canadian Football League (CFL). He played college football for the Maine Black Bears and Florida Atlantic Owls.

== Early life ==
Brown was born on January 26, 2003. He attended Trenton Central High School in Trenton, New Jersey, where he played at safety, wide receiver, linebacker, and return specialist.

== College career ==
Brown played college football for the Maine Black Bears from 2021 to 2023 and Florida Atlantic Owls from 2024. At Maine, he played in 43 games, recording 166 tackles, including 6.5 for loss, one sack, nine interceptions, 27 pass break ups, two forced fumbles and a blocked kick. After the 2023 season concluded, Brown entered the transfer portal.

On December 11, 2023, Brown committed to Florida Atlantic University. In 12 games, he had 44 tackles, including two for loss, two interceptions, eight pass deflections and a forced fumble.

== Professional career ==
Pre-draft measurables
Height	Weight	Arm length	Hand span	Wingspan	40-yard dash	10-yard split	20-yard split	20-yard shuttle	Three-cone drill	Vertical jump	Broad jump	Bench press
6 ft 1 in (1.85 m)	223 lb (101 kg)	32 1/2 in (0.83 m)	10 in (0.25 m)	6 ft 4 7/8 in (1.95 m)	4.54 s	1.59 s	2.70 s	4.37 s	7.16 s	37 in (0.94 m)	10 ft 01 in (3.07 m)	24 reps
All values from Pro day

=== Green Bay Packers ===
After not being selected in the 2025 NFL draft, Brown signed with the Green Bay Packers as an undrafted free agent. He was released on July 30.

=== Montreal Alouettes ===
On November 27, 2025, Brown signed a futures contract with the Montreal Alouettes of the Canadian Football League (CFL). He was released by the team on May 13, 2026.

=== Ottawa Redblacks ===
On September 7, 2026, Brown was signed to the practice roster of the Ottawa Redblacks. On September 18, he was elevated to the active roster and made his CFL debut on September 26 against the Calgary Stampeders. On September 24, Brown reverted to the practice roster. On September 29, he was again promoted to the active roster. On October 16, Brown made eight tackles and had his first interception in a win against the Toronto Argonauts.
