= Charlie Parks (Canadian football) =

Canadian gridiron football player (born 2004)

No. 94 – Ottawa Redblacks
- Position: Defensive lineman
- Roster status: Active
- CFL status: National

Personal information
- Born: September 27, 2004 (age 22)
- Listed height: 6 ft 4 in (1.93 m)
- Listed weight: 232 lb (105 kg)

Career information
- High school: Sheldon-Williams Collegiate (Regina, Saskatchewan)
- University: Saskatchewan (2022–2025)
- CFL draft: 2026: 4th round, 31st overall pick

Career history
- Ottawa Redblacks (2026–present)

Career CFL statistics as of 2026
- Tackles: 4
- Stats at CFL.ca

Charlie Parks (born September 27, 2004) is a Canadian professional football defensive lineman for the Ottawa Redblacks of the Canadian Football League (CFL). He played U Sports football for the Saskatchewan Huskies.

== Early life ==
Parks was born on September 27, 2004, and attended Sheldon-Williams Collegiate in Regina, Saskatchewan.

== University career ==
Parks played U Sports football for the Saskatchewan Huskies from 2022 to 2025. He played in 23 games, recording 53 tackles, including 17 for loss, 11 sacks, one forced fumble and one fumble recovery.

== Professional career ==
Pre-draft measurables
Height	Weight	40-yard dash	20-yard shuttle	Three-cone drill	Vertical jump	Broad jump	Bench press
6 ft 4 in (1.93 m)	232 lb (105 kg)	4.87 s	4.75 s	7.35 s	30 in (0.76 m)	9 ft 9 1/8 in (2.97 m)	15 reps
All values from CFL Combine

Parks was selected by the Ottawa Redblacks with the 31st overall pick in the fourth round of the 2026 CFL draft. On April 30, he signed with the team. On June 5, Parks was placed on the injured list. On June 27, he was elevated to the active roster and made his CFL debut the following day against the Montreal Alouettes, recording one tackle. On August 19, Parks was placed on the six-game injured list with a bicep injury. On September 25, he was promoted to the active roster. On October 15, Parks returned to the injured list with an elbow injury. He finished the year with four tackles on special teams.
