= Ryan Dinwiddie =

American football player and coach (born 1980)

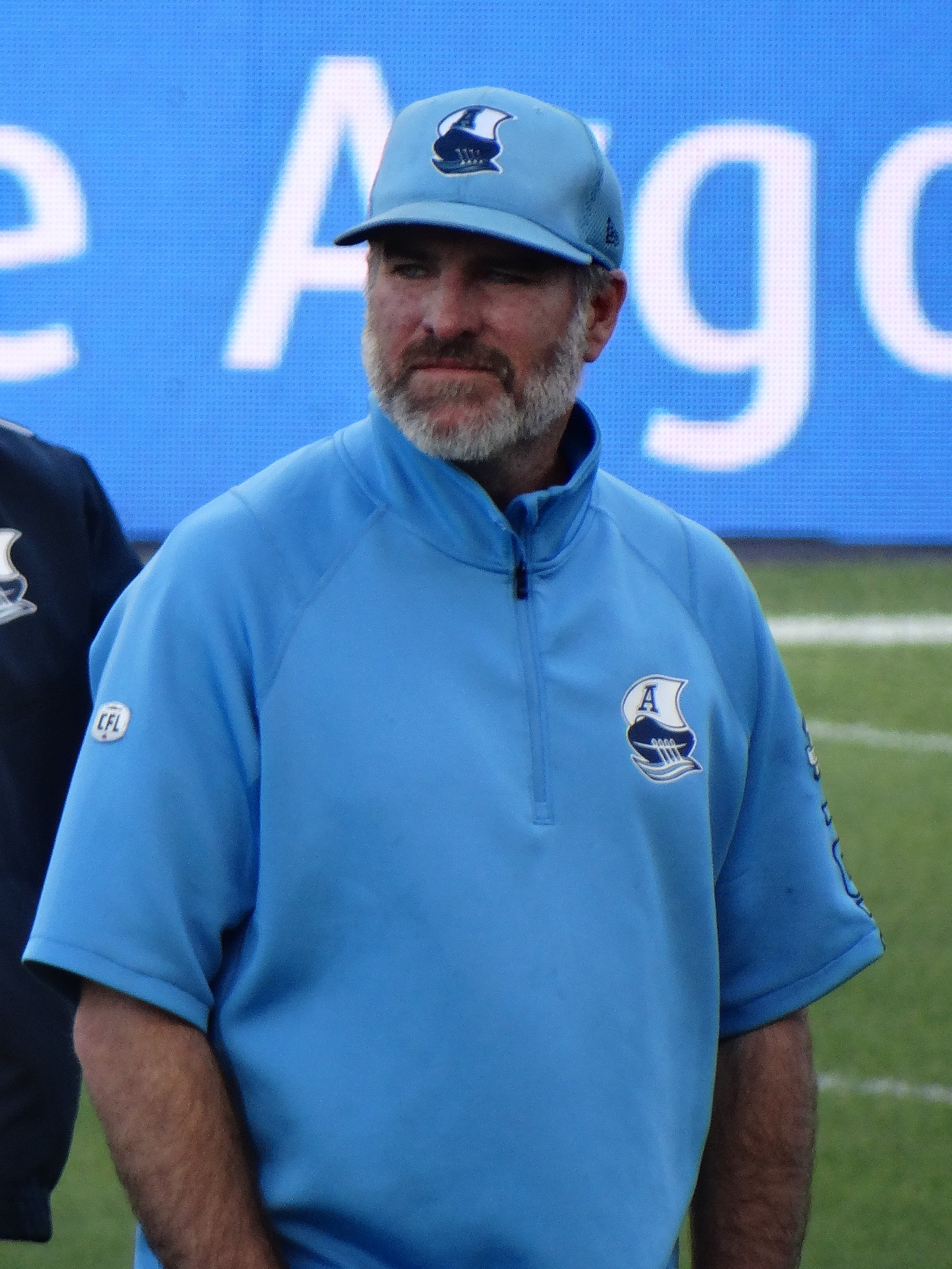
- Dinwiddie with the Toronto Argonauts in 2024

Ottawa Redblacks
- Title: Head coach, General manager

Personal information
- Born: November 27, 1980 (age 45); Sacramento, California, U.S.
- Listed height: 6 ft 1 in (1.85 m)
- Listed weight: 195 lb (88 kg)

Career information
- Position: Quarterback (No. 7, 2, 10, 4, 8)
- High school: Elk Grove (Elk Grove, California)
- College: Boise State
- NFL draft: 2004: undrafted

Career history

Playing
- 2004–2005: Chicago Bears*
- 2005: Hamburg Sea Devils
- 2005: Montreal Alouettes*
- 2006–2008: Winnipeg Blue Bombers
- 2010–2011: Saskatchewan Roughriders
- * Offseason or practice squad member only

Coaching
- 2013–2015: Montreal Alouettes (OQC)
- 2016–2019: Calgary Stampeders (QB)
- 2020–2025: Toronto Argonauts (HC)
- 2026–present: Ottawa Redblacks (HC)

Operations
- 2026–present: Ottawa Redblacks (GM)

Awards and highlights
- As player: WAC Offensive Player of the Year (2003); As assistant coach: Grey Cup champion (2018); As head coach: 2× Grey Cup champion (2022, 2024); CFL Coach of the Year (2023)
- Stats at CFL.ca (archive)

Ryan Lee Dinwiddie (born November 27, 1980) is an American professional football coach and former player who is the head coach and general manager of the Ottawa Redblacks of the Canadian Football League (CFL). He played as a quarterback in the CFL for the Winnipeg Blue Bombers and Saskatchewan Roughriders. He is a three-time Grey Cup champion after winning with the Calgary Stampeders as an assistant coach in 2018 and with the Toronto Argonauts as the head coach in 2022 and 2024.

== Early life ==
Ryan Lee Dinwiddie was born on November 27, 1980, in Sacramento, California. He graduated from Elk Grove High School in Elk Grove, California.

== College career ==
Dinwiddie was a three-year starter at Boise State from 2001 to 2003, and one of the most prolific passers in college football history. In 2003, he passed for 4,031 yards, 28 touchdowns, and only 5 interceptions. Dinwiddie's record NCAA Division I Football Bowl Subdivision (formerly Division I-A) for career passing efficiency with a mark of 168.9 was broken in 2007 by Colt Brennan's career 169.25.

Dinwiddie was also the 2003 WAC Offensive Player of the Year and the 2003 Fort Worth Bowl MVP. He is considered, by some, to be the greatest quarterback in the history of Boise State football, though many of his records and accomplishments went on to be surpassed by Kellen Moore.

== Professional career ==
Pre-draft measurables
Height	Weight
6 ft 0 1/2 in (1.84 m)	190 lb (86 kg)
Values from Pro Day

=== Chicago Bears and NFL Europe ===
After playing college football, Dinwiddie went undrafted in the 2004 NFL draft and signed with the Chicago Bears, however he was cut from their training camp and placed on their practice squad for the 2004 NFL season. The Bears then allocated Dinwiddie to play for the Hamburg Sea Devils of NFL Europe during the 2005 NFL Europe season, and was cut upon his return.

=== CFL ===
As of 2005, Dinwiddie had been on the negotiation list of the B.C. Lions for some time. The Lions released him from their negotiation list.

Near the end of the 2005 CFL season, Dinwiddie was signed to the practice roster of the Montreal Alouettes, and was resigned by the team on December 8, 2005.

On May 20, 2006, he was released by the Alouettes.

==== Winnipeg Blue Bombers ====
Dinwiddie joined the Winnipeg Blue Bombers in August 2006. This reunited him with Doug Berry, Winnipeg's head coach who been Montreal's offensive coordinator the year before. Dinwiddie's first significant playing time came early in the 2006 regular season finale in B.C., when Winnipeg's starting quarterback, Kevin Glenn, went down to an ankle sprain.

During the off-season, before the 2007 CFL season, Dinwiddie attempted to join Arizona Rattlers of the Arena Football League, lasting for three weeks with the Rattlers before learning that his CFL contract precluded him from playing during the 2007 Arena Football League season.

In the 2007 regular season, Dinwiddie's most noteworthy playing time came when Glenn went down to a knee injury against the Hamilton Tiger-Cats on September 15. In the East Division Final, Glenn left the game in the 4th quarter with a broken left arm, and Dinwiddie was pressed into action. He made his first CFL start for the Blue Bombers against the Saskatchewan Roughriders in the 2007 Grey Cup, won by Saskatchewan 23 to 19. Dinwiddie gave up 3 interceptions to James Johnson.

In the 2008 regular season, Dinwiddie's most noteworthy moment came after Winnipeg started 0-4. Berry decided to start Dinwiddie instead of Glenn in game 5 against the Calgary Stampeders because he "tried to shake up his troops to get in the win column." Making just his second career CFL start (and first career CFL regular season start), Dinwiddie moved the ball, avoided sacks and kept plays alive. He finished 24 of 39 for 450 yards and one touchdown with no interceptions, ran for 26 yards on six carries, and threw a 35-yard touchdown pass to Romby Bryant with 12 seconds left to give the Blue Bombers their first win of the season.

Dinwiddie's success was short-lived with the Blue Bombers, however. During his 3 years as a backup in Winnipeg, his career CFL statistics are 58.2% completion percentage, for 1,581 yards, 6 Touchdowns and 9 Interceptions, for a passer rating of 73.8. He also rushed the ball 23 times for 112 yards, 1 Touchdown, and 2 Fumbles.

Dinwiddie was released at the beginning of the Blue Bombers 2009 training camp.

==== Saskatchewan Roughriders ====
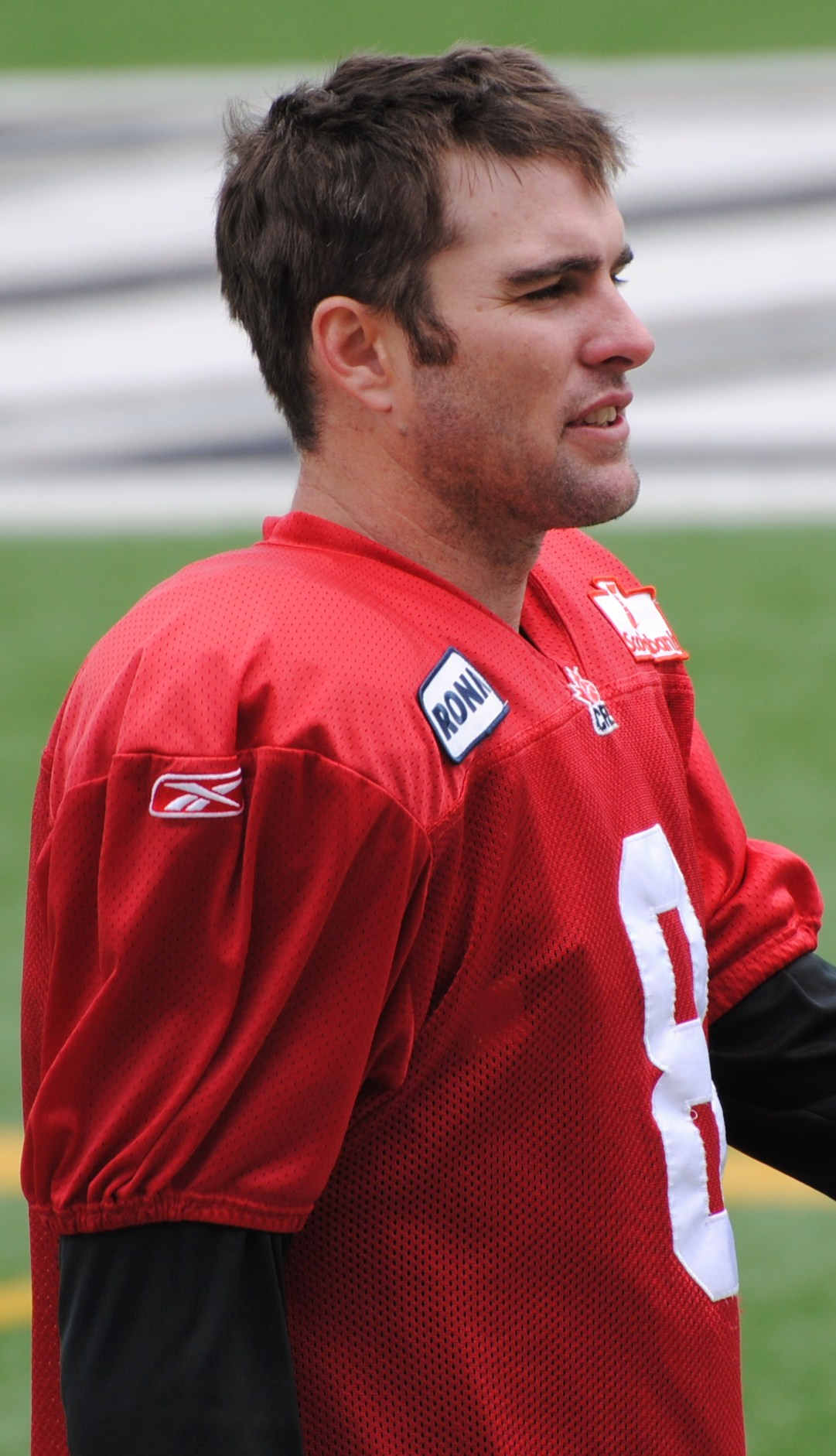
Dinwiddie with the Saskatchewan Roughriders in 2010

On May 26, 2010, it was announced that Dinwiddie had signed a contract with the Saskatchewan Roughriders. Dinwiddie was once again reunited with Doug Berry, who was now Saskatchewan's offensive coordinator. In 2010, Dinwiddie served as back-up to Darian Durant. The Roughriders went to the Grey Cup, and lost to the Montreal Alouettes 21-18.

In 2011, Dinwiddie was once again the back-up to Durant. Saskatchewan started 1-7, and fired new head coach Greg Marshall, as well as Berry. Dinwiddie started three games at the end of the season when Durant was out with injury.

Dinwiddie was released on January 19, 2012. He retired as a player shortly thereafter.

== Career statistics ==
=== CFL regular season ===
Year	Team	GP	GS	ATT	COMP	YD	TD	INT	RUSH	YD	TD
2006	WPG	9	0	24	11	107	1	3	1	1	0
2007	WPG	18	0	24	17	175	0	0	1	10	0
2008	WPG	17	3	159	93	1,299	5	6	21	101	1
2010	SSK	18	0	12	6	103	2	1	0	-	-
2011	SSK	18	3	111	56	847	3	4	13	65	0
Totals		80	6	330	183	2,531	11	14	36	177	1

=== Playoffs ===
Year & game	Team	GP	GS	ATT	COMP	YD	TD	INT	RUSH	YD	TD
2006 East Semi-Final	WPG	1	0	0	-	-	-	-	0	-	-
2007 East Semi-Final	WPG	1	0	0	-	-	-	-	0	-	-
2007 East Final	WPG	1	0	4	4	80	0	0	0	-	-
2008 East Semi-Final	WPG	0	-	-	-	-	-	-	-	-	-
2010 West Semi-Final	SSK	1	0	0	-	-	-	-	0	-	-
2010 West Final	SSK	1	0	0	-	-	-	-	0	-	-
Totals		5	0	4	4	80	0	0	0	-	-

=== Grey Cup ===
Year	Team	GP	GS	ATT	COMP	YD	TD	INT	RUSH	YD	TD
2007	WPG	1	1	33	15	225	1	3	2	5	0
2010	SSK	1	0	0	-	-	-	-	0	-	-
Totals		2	1	33	15	225	1	3	2	5	0

=== College ===
Season	Team	Games			Passing								Rushing			
Season	Team	GP	GS	Record	Cmp	Att	Pct	Yds	Y/A	TD	Int	Rtg	Att	Yds	Avg	TD
1999	Boise State	0	0	—	Redshirted (redshirt)											
2000	Boise State	8	0	—	11	19	57.9	137	7.2	2	0	153.2	9	1	0.1	0
2001	Boise State	11	11	7–4	201	322	62.4	3,043	9.5	29	11	164.7	71	97	1.4	3
2002	Boise State	9	8	7–1	134	205	65.4	2,283	11.1	20	3	188.2	36	–36	–1.0	3
2003	Boise State	14	14	13–1	276	446	61.9	4,356	9.8	31	7	163.7	81	43	0.5	12
Career		42	37	27–6	622	992	62.7	9,819	9.9	82	21	168.9	197	105	0.5	18

== Coaching career ==
=== Assistant coach ===
==== Montreal Alouettes ====
On February 19, 2013, it was announced that Dinwiddie was joining the coaching staff of the Montreal Alouettes newly hired head coach, Dan Hawkins, as the offensive quality control coach. Hawkins had coached Dinwiddie at Boise State University from 2001 to 2003. Dinwiddie was once again reunited with Doug Berry, who was the Senior Advisor to Hawkins on the staff. On August 1, 2013, Hawkins was fired by the team after starting the season 2–3, and general manager Jim Popp replaced him as head coach. After the season, Dinwiddie agreed to a two-year contract extension with the club, keeping him with the Alouettes until the 2015 season.

In 2014, Dinwiddie started the season as Montreal's quarterbacks coach under new head coach Tom Higgins. During the season, he became the team's offensive coordinator.

In 2015, Dinwiddie started the season as Montreal's running backs' coach under Higgins. However, Higgins was replaced as head coach, with Popp once again becoming the team's head coach. In September, Dinwiddie and Anthony Calvillo, the team's receivers' coach, would act as co-offensive coordinators after Turk Schonert was relieved of his offensive coordinator duties.

==== Calgary Stampeders ====
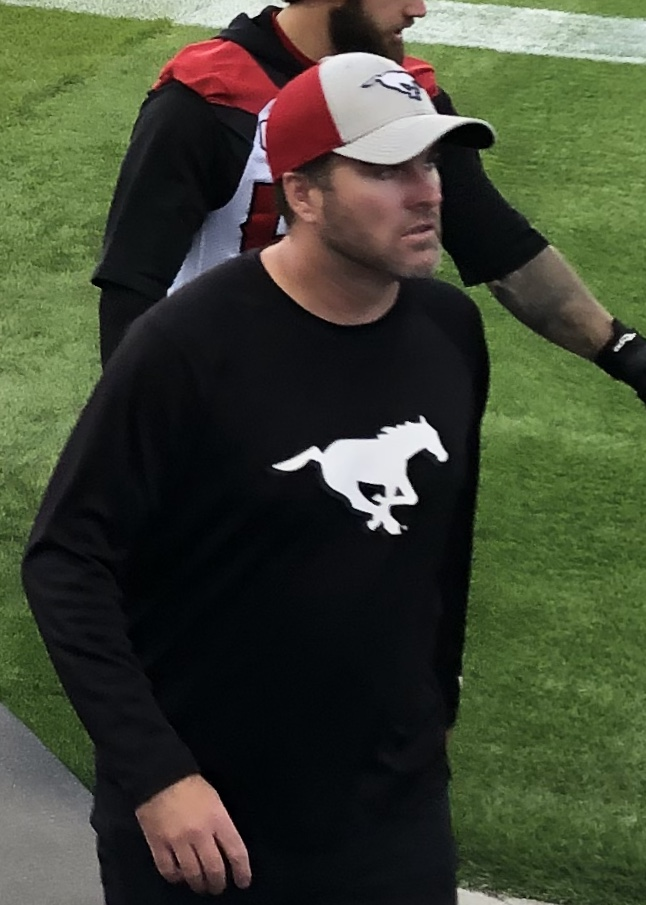
Dinwiddie with the Calgary Stampeders in 2019

On December 8, 2015, Dinwiddie was hired by the Calgary Stampeders as the team's QB coach. Under Dinwiddie, Bo Levi Mitchell won CFL Most Outstanding Player in 2016 and 2018, and led the CFL in touchdown passes in both seasons. Calgary reached the Grey Cup in 2016, 2017, and 2018, winning in 2018.

In 2019, Mitchell suffered a pectoral injury in Week 3 and was subsequently placed on the six-game injured reserve list. In total, he missed seven games during the 2019 season. In Mitchell's absence, Calgary's quarterback was Nick Arbuckle. In the game in which Mitchell got injured, Arbuckle led Calgary to a comeback victory against B.C. The following week, Arbuckle got his first CFL start, in Saskatchewan, and threw for 262 yards en route to a 37-10 Calgary win. Arbuckle's record as starting quarterback in 2019 was 4-3. Mitchell was 8-3 as Calgary's starting quarterback.

=== Head coach ===
==== Toronto Argonauts ====
On December 12, 2019, Dinwiddie was named the head coach of the Toronto Argonauts, the 45th in team history. However, the 2020 CFL season was cancelled and he did not coach in 2020. In his first season, in 2021, he led the team to a first-place finish in the East Division, but the club lost the East Final to the Hamilton Tiger-Cats.

In 2022, after a 4–5 start to the season, Dinwiddie led the team to an 11–7 finish and a second consecutive first-place finish in the East Division. He earned his first playoff victory against the Montreal Alouettes in the East Final and coached in his first Grey Cup as a head coach. He led the team to the 18th championship in franchise history after the team defeated the Winnipeg Blue Bombers in the 109th Grey Cup game.

In 2023, Dinwiddie led the team to their best record in franchise history and tied a CFL record with a 16–2 win–loss record. The team also started the season with an 11–1 record which was the best start to a season in franchise history and they also finished undefeated at home in the regular season. The Argonauts also set a CFL record as the earliest to clinch a first place finish with six games remaining in an 18-game schedule. However, much like the only other team to finish with 16 regular season wins (the 1989 Edmonton Eskimos), the Argonauts were upset in the East Final. Dinwiddie won the CFL Coach of the Year Award.

In 2024, Argonaut starting quarterback Chad Kelly was suspended for the first nine games of the season. Despite this, the team had a 5-4 record. The Argonauts finished 10-8 and second place in the East Division. The team defeated Ottawa and Montreal en route to the Grey Cup. In the East Division Final against Montreal, Kelly suffered a broken tibia, and Nick Arbuckle finished the game. Arbuckle started the Grey Cup and was named the Grey Cup Most Valuable Player as the Argonauts defeated the Winnipeg Blue Bombers 41-24, and won their second Grey Cup in three seasons under Dinwiddie.

With Kelly rehabilitating his injury into the 2025 season, Dinwiddie continued to start Arbuckle at quarterback. The team had a challenging start to the season, losing their first three games including their week 3 loss on a kick return touchdown by the Roughriders for their game-winning score. Dinwiddie's Argonauts then won two of their next four before losing three straight. The team then won three straight, but lost Arbuckle to injury in their week 15 win against the Elks. The team's third stringer, Jarret Doege played in four of the final five games, which were all losses, as the Argonauts failed to qualify for the playoffs for the first time in Dinwiddie's career.

==== Ottawa Redblacks ====
On November 5, 2025, it was announced that Dinwiddie had been hired as the head coach and general manager of the Ottawa Redblacks. The Redblacks went 1–17 in 2026, tied for the worst record in modern CFL history with the 2003 Hamilton Tiger-Cats.

=== CFL coaching record ===
Team	Year	Regular season					Postseason		
Team	Year	Won	Lost	Ties	Win %	Finish	Won	Lost	Result
TOR	2021	9	5	0	.643	1st in East Division	0	1	Lost in East Final
TOR	2022	11	7	0	.611	1st in East Division	2	0	Won 109th Grey Cup
TOR	2023	16	2	0	.889	1st in East Division	0	1	Lost in East Final
TOR	2024	10	8	0	.556	2nd in East Division	3	0	Won 111th Grey Cup
TOR	2025	5	13	0	.278	3rd in East Division	–	–	Did not qualify
OTT	2026	1	17	0	.056	4th in East Division	–	–	Did not qualify
Total		52	52	0	.500	3 Division Championships	5	2	2 Grey Cups
