= Ahmari Harvey =

American football player (born 2003)

Profile
- Position: Cornerback

Personal information
- Born: March 23, 2003 (age 23)
- Listed height: 5 ft 11 in (1.80 m)
- Listed weight: 185 lb (84 kg)

Career information
- High school: Florida State University Schools (Tallahassee, Florida)
- College: Auburn (2021); Georgia Tech (2022–2025)
- NFL draft: 2026: undrafted

Career history
- Denver Broncos (2026)*; Pittsburgh Steelers (2026)*; Miami Dolphins (2026)*; Ottawa Redblacks (2026)
- * Offseason or practice squad member only

Ahmari Harvey (born March 23, 2003) is a American professional football cornerback. He played college football for the Auburn Tigers and Georgia Tech Yellow Jackets and was signed by the Denver Broncos as an undrafted free agent in 2026.

== Early life ==
Attending high school at Florida State University Schools, Harvey was a multi-sport athlete, playing on the football team and being a state qualifier in the long jump. Playing as both a wide receiver and a defensive back, he made 40 receptions for 642 yards while simultaneously recording 94 tackles and six interceptions during his junior year in 2019. As a senior in 2020, he scored receiving, interception return, and kick return touchdowns. His smoothness as a receiver earned him the nickname "Saucy" from his teammates. Coming out of high school, he was rated a four-star recruit and ranked as the #30th overall prospect in the state of Florida by Rivals.com and the #5 safety prospect in the country by ESPN.

== College career ==
=== Auburn ===
Harvey initially committed to play college football at Auburn University. He cited his relationship with defensive backs coach Wes McGriff as a major reason in him choosing Auburn over Florida State University, the sponsor of his high school that he had also received an offer from. After redshirting his freshman year in 2021, he entered the transfer portal prior to the 2022 season. His decision to transfer was partially influenced by a disconnect with the new coaching regime under head coach Bryan Harsin, as he had initially been recruited in 2020 by Gus Malzahn, who was fired soon thereafter. Harsin was widely unpopular with the players at Auburn, with sixteen of Harvey's teammates (including starting quarterback Bo Nix) also transferring after the 2021 season.

=== Georgia Tech ===
In January 2022, Harvey transferred to Georgia Tech. As a redshirt freshman, he played in nine games exclusively as a special teamer, recording a single tackle and a fumble recovery.

During his sophomore season in 2023, Harvey carved out a role on defense after making a switch from safety to cornerback, participating in 11 games and starting in six of them. In a game against the North Carolina Tar Heels, Harvey made a hard hit on wide receiver Devontez Walker, forcing a fumble that was then recovered by the Yellow Jackets with less than three minutes left in the fourth quarter. The Yellow Jackets would go on to win the game 46–42, upsetting the No. 17 ranked Tar Heels. In total, he logged 31 tackles, one forced fumble, six pass deflections, and three interceptions in 2023. Following the conclusion of the season, he was named to the AP's 2023 All-Bowl team.

In 2024, Harvey started in all 13 games, making a career-high 63 tackles, two and a half tackles-for-loss, one forced fumble, one fumble recovery, three pass defections, and one interception.

During his senior season in 2025, Harvey suffered a severe ankle dislocation in a game against Virginia Tech on October 11. Despite being given a projected six-week recovery timeline, he returned to the field after just three weeks, ending the season with 26 tackles, three tackles-for-loss, one sack, and seven pass deflections across 10 games and eight starts.

== Professional career ==
Pre-draft measurables
Height	Weight	Arm length	Hand span	Wingspan	40-yard dash	10-yard split	20-yard split	Vertical jump	Broad jump	Bench press
5 ft 11 3/8 in (1.81 m)	185 lb (84 kg)	30 3/8 in (0.77 m)	9 3/8 in (0.24 m)	6 ft 1 5/8 in (1.87 m)	4.52 s	1.52 s	2.58 s	31.0 in (0.79 m)	9 ft 8 in (2.95 m)	15 reps
All values from NFL Combine/Pro Day

=== Denver Broncos ===
After going unselected in the 2026 NFL draft, Harvey signed with the Denver Broncos as an undrafted free agent on May 8, 2026. On June 18, he was waived by the Broncos.

=== Pittsburgh Steelers ===
On June 25, 2026, Harvey was signed by the Pittsburgh Steelers. He was released by the Steelers on August 6.

=== Miami Dolphins ===
On August 7, 2026, Harvey was claimed off waivers by the Miami Dolphins. On August 24, Harvey was waived.

=== Ottawa Redblacks ===
On September 22, 2026, Harvey signed with the Ottawa Redblacks of the Canadian Football League (CFL). On October 26, he was released.
