= Jessie Evans (Canadian football) =

American gridiron football player (born 2002)

No. 29 – Ottawa Redblacks
- Position: Defensive lineman
- Roster status: Active
- CFL status: American

Personal information
- Born: September 19, 2002 (age 24); St. Louis, Missouri, U.S.
- Listed height: 6 ft 2 in (1.88 m)
- Listed weight: 251 lb (114 kg)

Career information
- High school: C.E. King (Harris County, Texas)
- College: Prairie View A&M (2021–2022); Louisiana Tech (2023–2024)
- NFL draft: 2025: undrafted

Career history
- Ottawa Redblacks (2025–present)

Career CFL statistics as of 2026
- Tackles: 6
- Sacks: 1
- Forced fumbles: 1
- Stats at CFL.ca

Jessie Evans (born September 19, 2002) is an American professional football defensive lineman for the Ottawa Redblacks of the Canadian Football League (CFL). He played college football for the Prairie View A&M Panthers and Louisiana Tech Bulldogs.

== Early life ==
Evans was born on September 19, 2002, in St. Louis, Missouri. He attended C.E. King High School in Harris County, Texas, where he played basketball, football and track and field.

== College career ==
Evans played college football for the Prairie View A&M Panthers from 2021 to 2022 and Louisiana Tech Bulldogs from 2023 to 2024. At Prairie View A&M, he played in 24 games, recording 110 tackles, including 23 for loss, seven sacks, two pass deflections, three forced fumbles and two fumble recoveries. Evans then transferred to Louisiana Tech University where he played in 24 games. He logged 72 tackles, with 12.5 for loss, 5.5 sacks and one pass break up.

== Professional career ==
After going unselected in the 2025 NFL draft, Evans signed with the Ottawa Redblacks of the Canadian Football League (CFL) as an undrafted free agent. On October 26, he signed a futures contract with the team. On May 31, 2026, Evans was assigned to the practice roster. On June 27, he was elevated to the active roster and made his CFL debut the following day against the Montreal Alouettes. On July 2, Evans was signed to the practice roster. On August 10, he was promoted to the active roster. On September 11, Evans was placed on the injured list. On September 25, he was activated for the game against the Calgary Stampeders. On October 15, Evans was transferred to the injured list.
