= Pete Costanza (gridiron football) =

American gridiron football coach (born 1970)

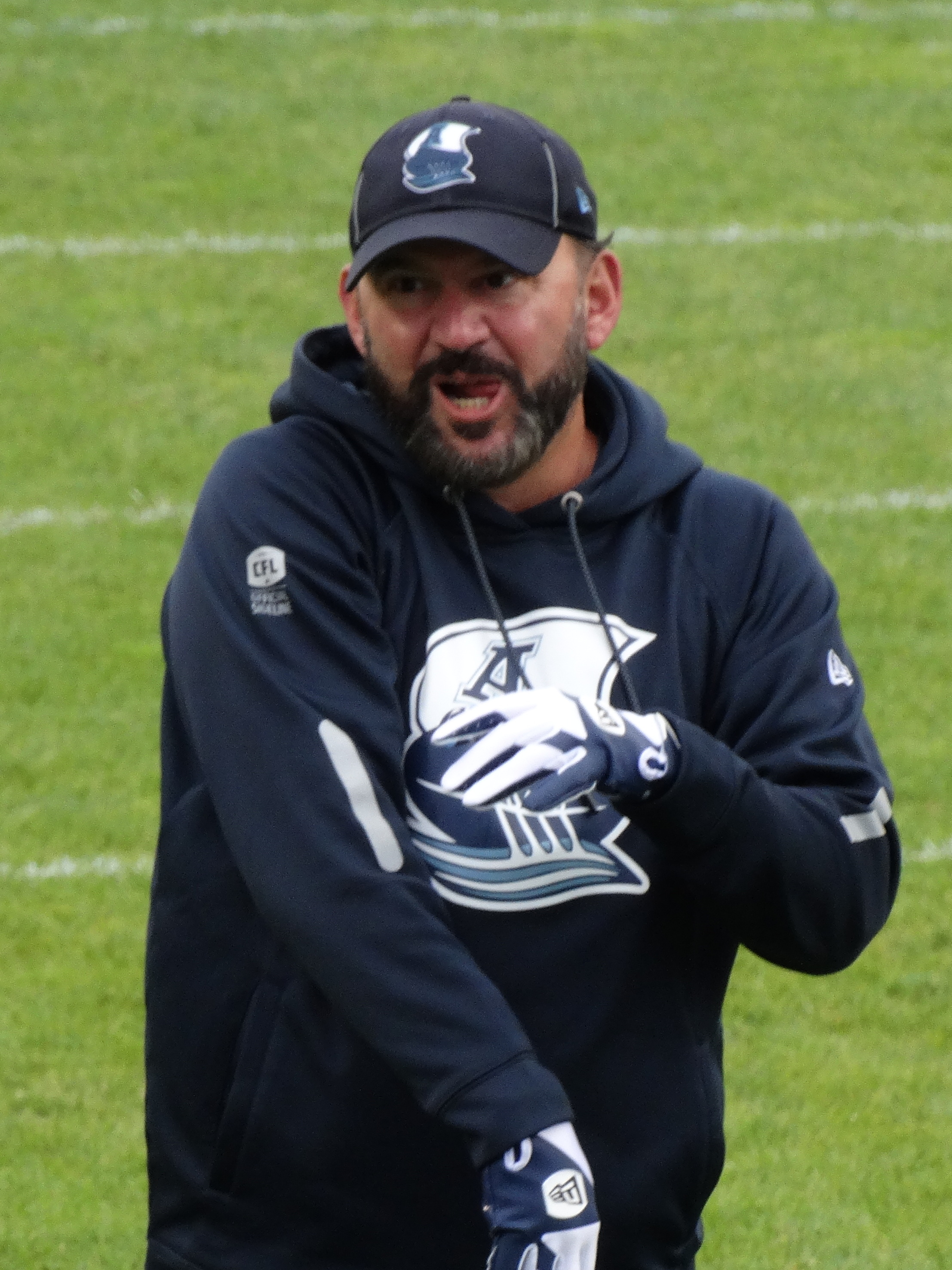
- Costanza with the Toronto Argonauts in 2022

Ottawa Redblacks
- Title: Receivers coach

Personal information
- Born: 1970 (age 55–56); New Jersey, U.S.

Career information
- College: William Paterson

Career history
- 1997–1999: New Jersey Red Dogs (Assistant coach)
- 2000: Roanoke Steam (Offensive coordinator)
- 2001: Iowa Barnstormers (Offensive coordinator)
- 2002: Columbus Wardogs (Head coach)
- 2003: Albany Conquest (Head coach)
- 2004–2005: Columbus Destroyers (Head coach, Offensive coordinator)
- 2005–2007: Albany Conquest (Head coach)
- 2006–2007: Rensselaer Polytechnic Institute (Defensive backs coach)
- 2008–2019: Calgary Stampeders (Receivers coach)
- 2020–2021: Winnipeg Blue Bombers (Running backs coach)
- 2022–2025: Toronto Argonauts (Pass game coordinator, Receivers coach)
- 2026–present: Ottawa Redblacks (Receivers coach)

Awards and highlights
- 6× Grey Cup champion (2008, 2014, 2018, 2021, 2022, 2024)

Pete Costanza (born 1970) is an American football coach who is the wide receivers coach for the Ottawa Redblacks of the Canadian Football League (CFL). He is a six-time Grey Cup champion as an assistant coach, having won three times with the Calgary Stampeders, once with the Winnipeg Blue Bombers, and twice with the Argonauts.

== College career ==
Costanza played college football as a wide receiver for the William Paterson Pioneers and graduated from William Paterson University in 1994.

== Coaching career ==
=== Arena football ===
Costanza began his coaching career as volunteer coach for the New Jersey Red Dogs of the Arena Football League under head coach John Hufnagel. He was an assistant coach for three years there before becoming the offensive coordinator for the Roanoke Steam in 2000 and then the Iowa Barnstormers in 2001. In 2002, he became the head coach for the Columbus Wardogs. He moved to the Albany Conquest in 2003, also as head coach, before joining the Columbus Destroyers in 2004 to serve as both head coach and offensive coordinator. He resigned from his position with the Destroyers in 2005 and re-joined the Conquest on May 24, 2005, where he was named head coach and director of football operations.

=== Rensselaer Polytechnic Institute ===
While still coaching in the AF2, Costanza was hired as the defensive backs coach for the RPI Engineers in 2006. He spent two seasons coaching for Rensselaer.

=== Calgary Stampeders ===
Costanza first entered the CFL as a receivers coach for the Calgary Stampeders in 2008, as part of John Hufnagel's inaugural staff which reunited the pair after first working together for the New Jersey Red Dogs. In his first year, the Stampeders won the 96th Grey Cup. He continued to work in this position as the Stampeders won championships in 2014 and 2018. On November 27, 2019, it was announced that Costanza and the Stampeders had decided to part ways, although it was reported that he could not be retained due to the newly implemented football operations salary cap imposed by the league.

=== Winnipeg Blue Bombers ===
On January 21, 2020, it was announced that Costanza had joined the Winnipeg Blue Bombers to serve as the team's running backs coach. After the league cancelled the 2020 CFL season, the Blue Bombers ended the 2021 season victorious in the 108th Grey Cup game and Costanza won his fourth championship.

=== Toronto Argonauts ===
It was announced on January 19, 2022, that Costanza had joined the Toronto Argonauts as their receivers coach and pass game coordinator. In his first year, the Argonauts won the 109th Grey Cup and Costanza won his fifth championship. In the following offseason, he was a finalist for the offensive coordinator position for the Saskatchewan Roughriders. However he remained with the Argonauts as the team finished with a 16–2 record, but faltered in the East Final. As the pass game coordinator in 2024, Costanza worked with three different starting quarterbacks as the team finished 10–8 and won the 111th Grey Cup.

=== Ottawa Redblacks ===
It was announced on January 8, 2026, that Costanza had joined the Ottawa Redblacks to serve as their receivers coach.
