= Eastern Ontario =

Secondary region of Ontario, Canada

Eastern Ontario Est de l'Ontario
- Secondary region
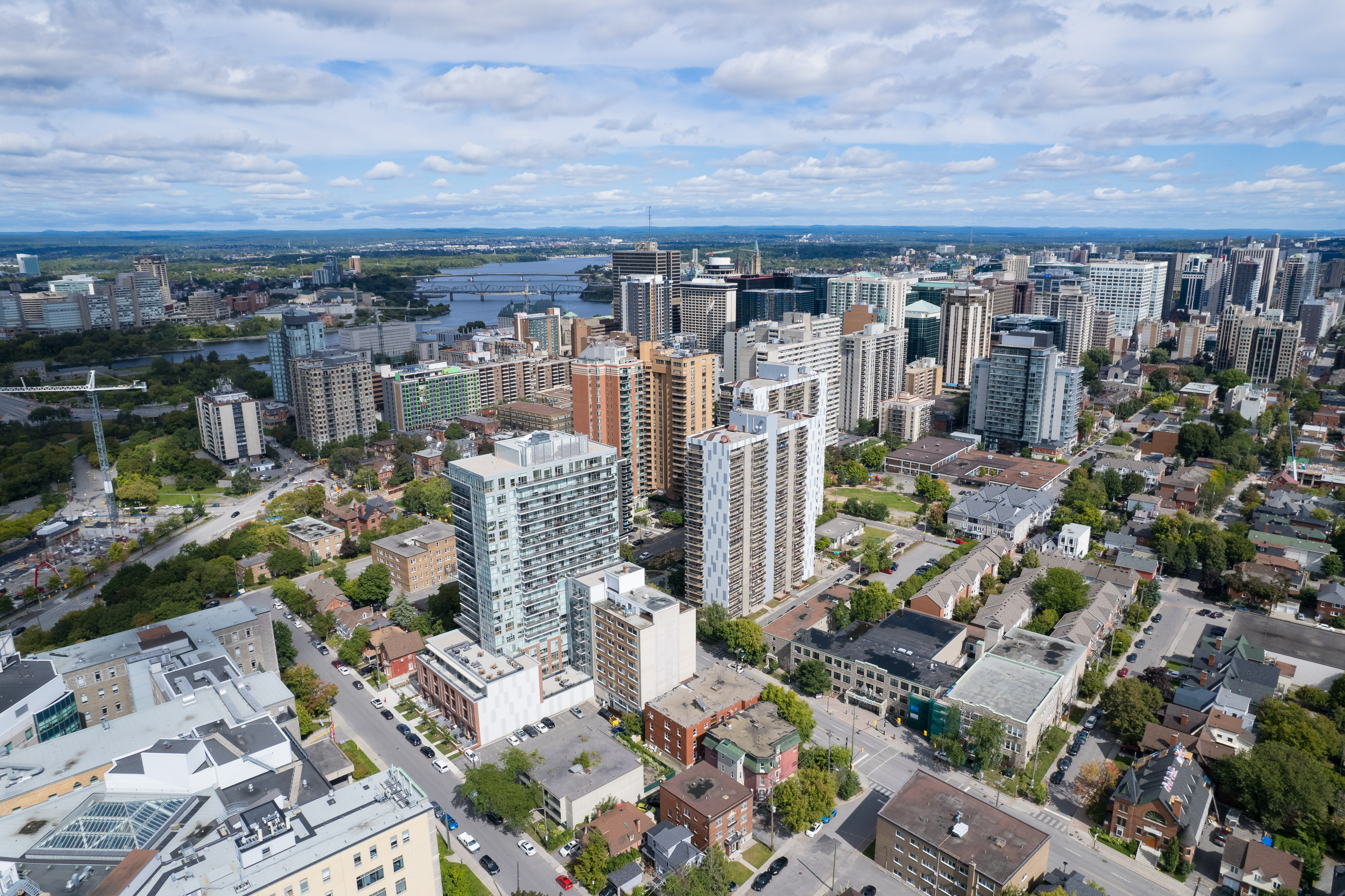
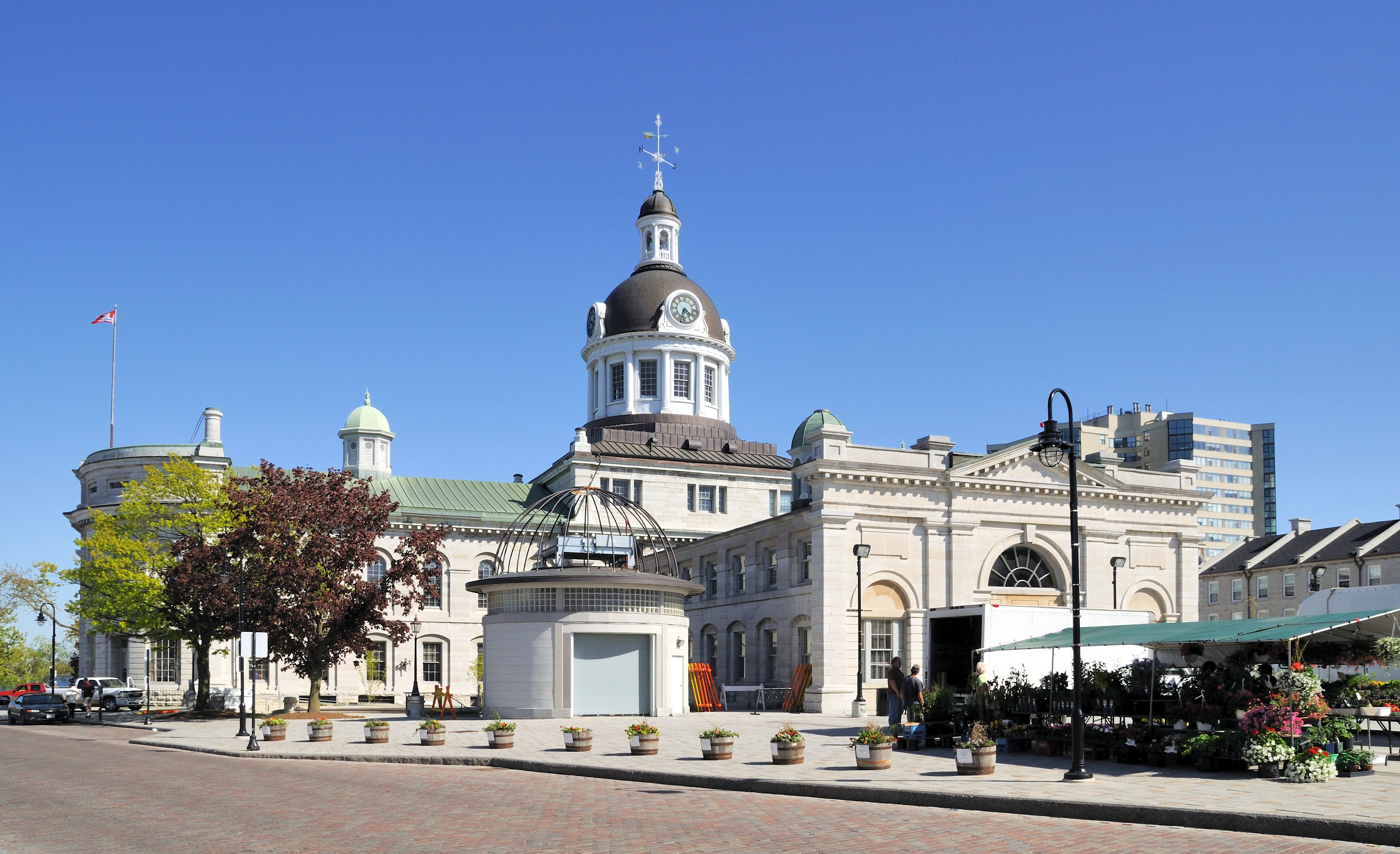
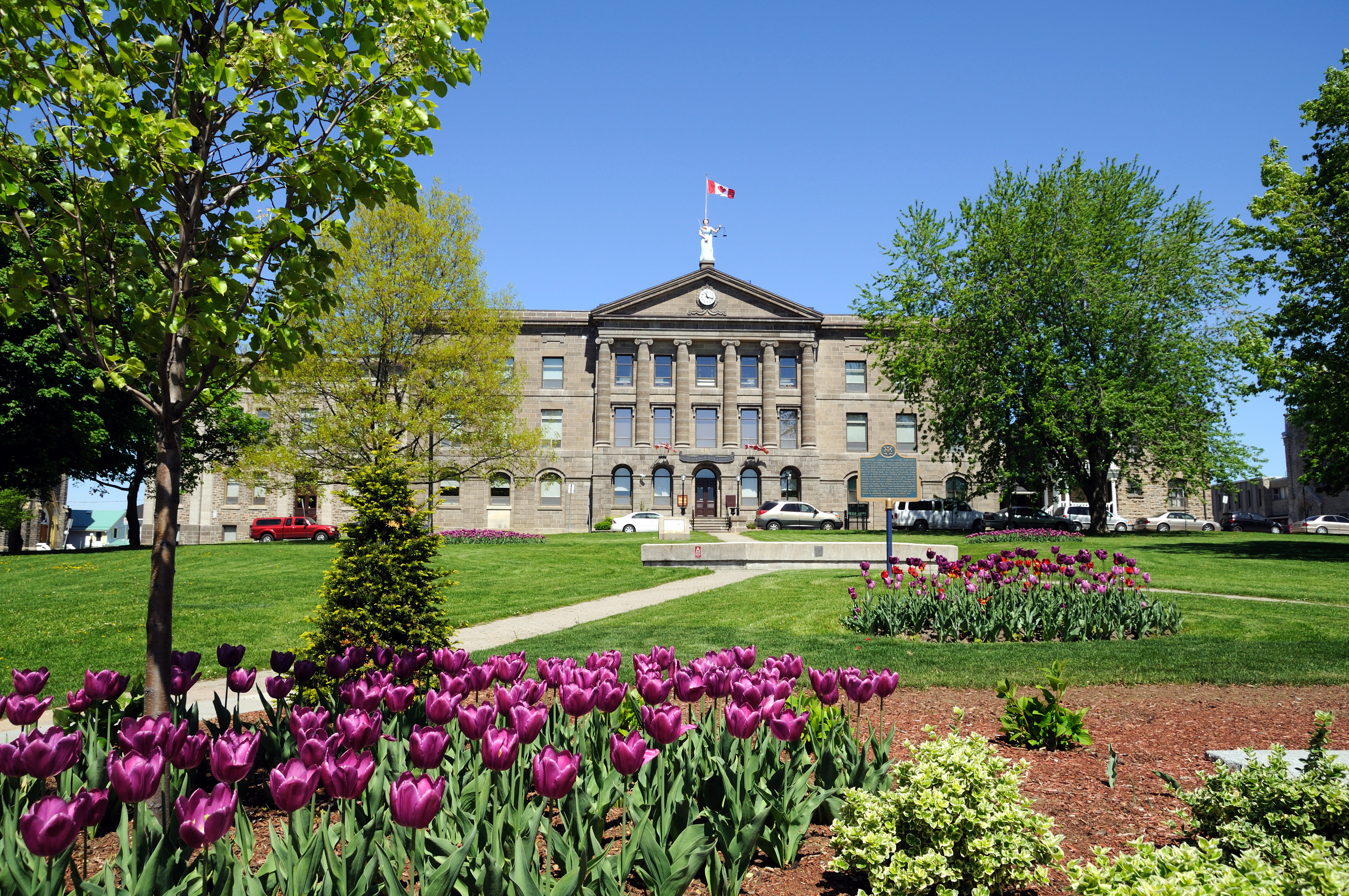
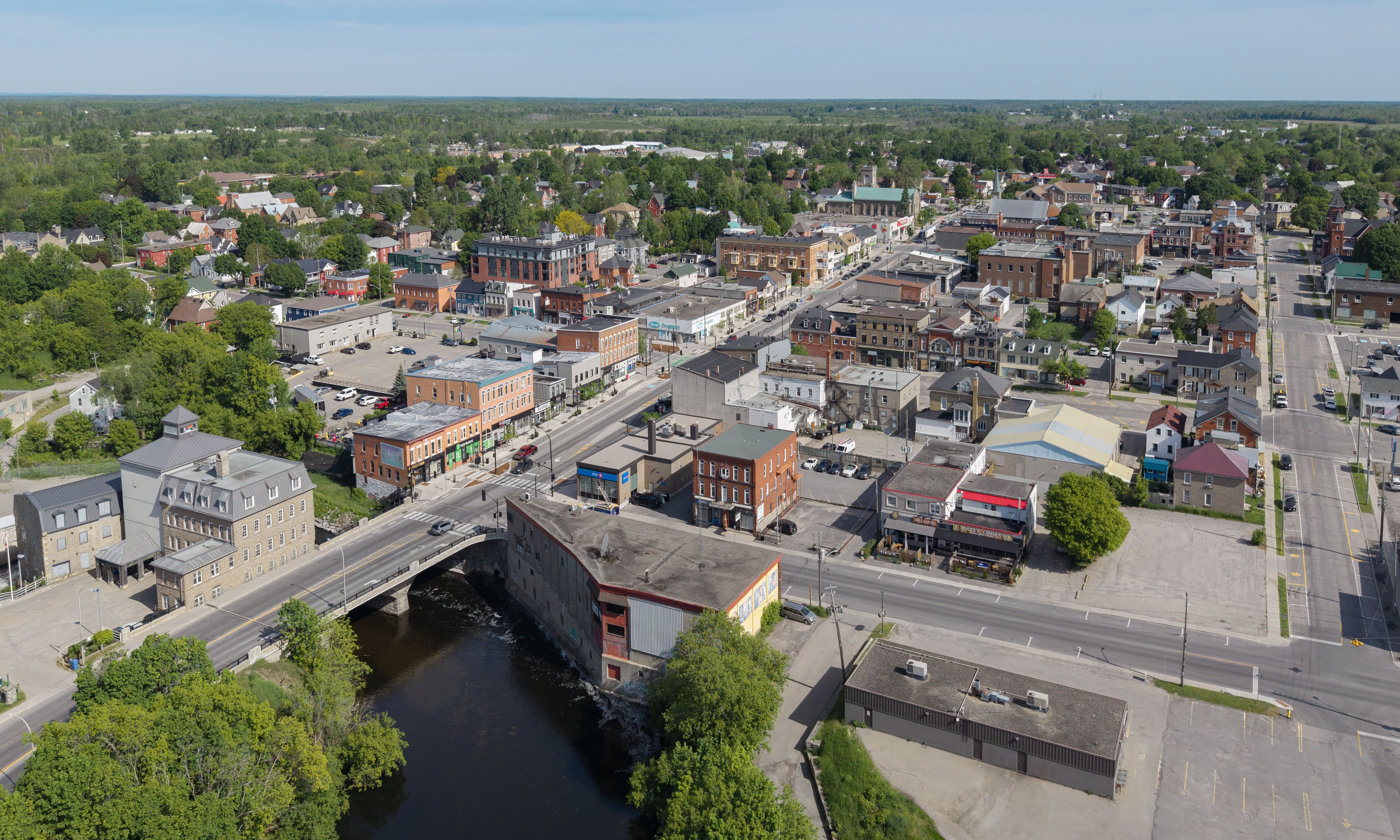
- From top to bottom, left to right: Ottawa, Kingston, Brockville, Smiths Falls

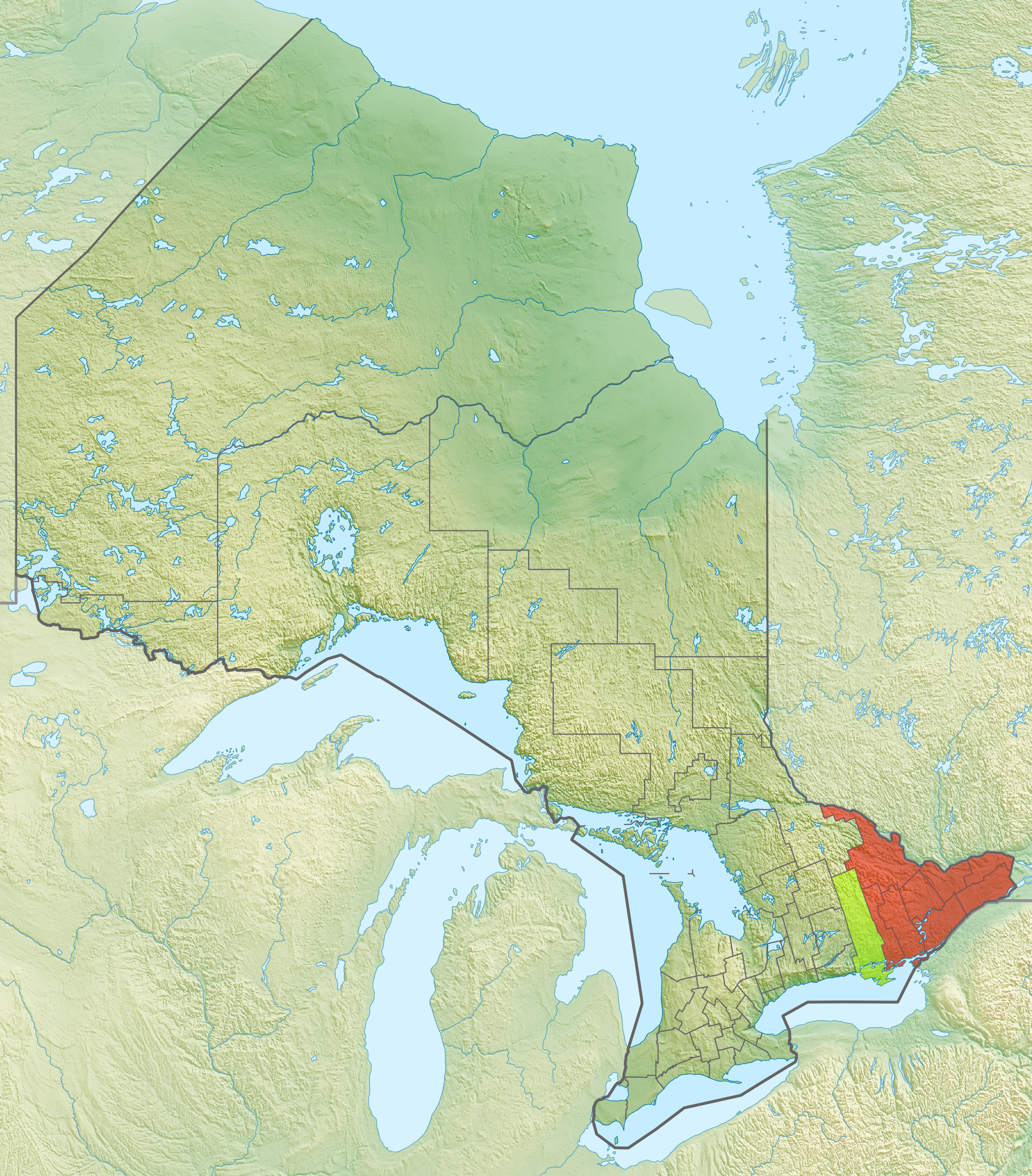
- Core area Extended area
- Country: Canada
- Province: Ontario

Area
  - Total: 34,356.45 km^{2} (13,265.10 sq mi)
  - Core: 28,014.95 km^{2} (10,816.63 sq mi)
  - Extended area: 6,341.50 km^{2} (2,448.47 sq mi)

Population (2021)
  - Total: 1,892,332
  - Density: 55.07938/km^{2} (142.6549/sq mi)
  - Core: 1,720,882
  - Extended area: 171,450
- Time zone: UTC−05:00 (EST)
  - Summer (DST): UTC−04:00 (EDT)
- Postal code prefix: K
- Area codes: 613, 343

Eastern Ontario (census population 1,892,332 in 2021) (French: Est de l'Ontario) is a secondary region of Southern Ontario in the Canadian province of Ontario. It occupies a wedge-shaped area bounded by the Ottawa River and Quebec to the northeast and east, the St. Lawrence River and New York State to the south, and Northern Ontario and Central Ontario to the west and northwest.

== Definitions ==
Municipalities frequently categorized as Eastern Ontario

The traditional definition of the region boundary can be traced back to early colonial districts in the British Province of Quebec and Upper Canada. The Midland and Eastern Districts, originally known as the Mecklenburg District and Lunenburg District, from 1788 to 1792, were originally designated as everything east of north-south lines intersecting the outlets of the Trent River into the Bay of Quinte (in the case of Mecklenburg/Midland) and the Gananoque River into the St. Lawrence River (in the case of Lunenberg/Eastern). The original boundary lines followed a straight north-south alignment, but were eventually changed to a northwest-southeast orientation, similar to how the modern county boundaries are aligned.

Some government sources may include Hastings County, Prince Edward (considered part of the Eastern Ontario extended area), and occasionally Northumberland County within the definition of Eastern Ontario, but are otherwise classified as part of Central Ontario.

The region is also occasionally referred to as Southeastern Ontario to differentiate it from Northeastern Ontario, a secondary region of Northern Ontario.

== History ==
Indigenous peoples had occupied Eastern Ontario for thousands of years prior to European settlement. Archaeological sites such as the Point Peninsula Complex indicate the presence of Paleo-Indians in the area dating back approximately 9,000 years. First Nations peoples located in the region included Anishinaabe, Algonquin, and Haudenosaunee (Iroquois) peoples.

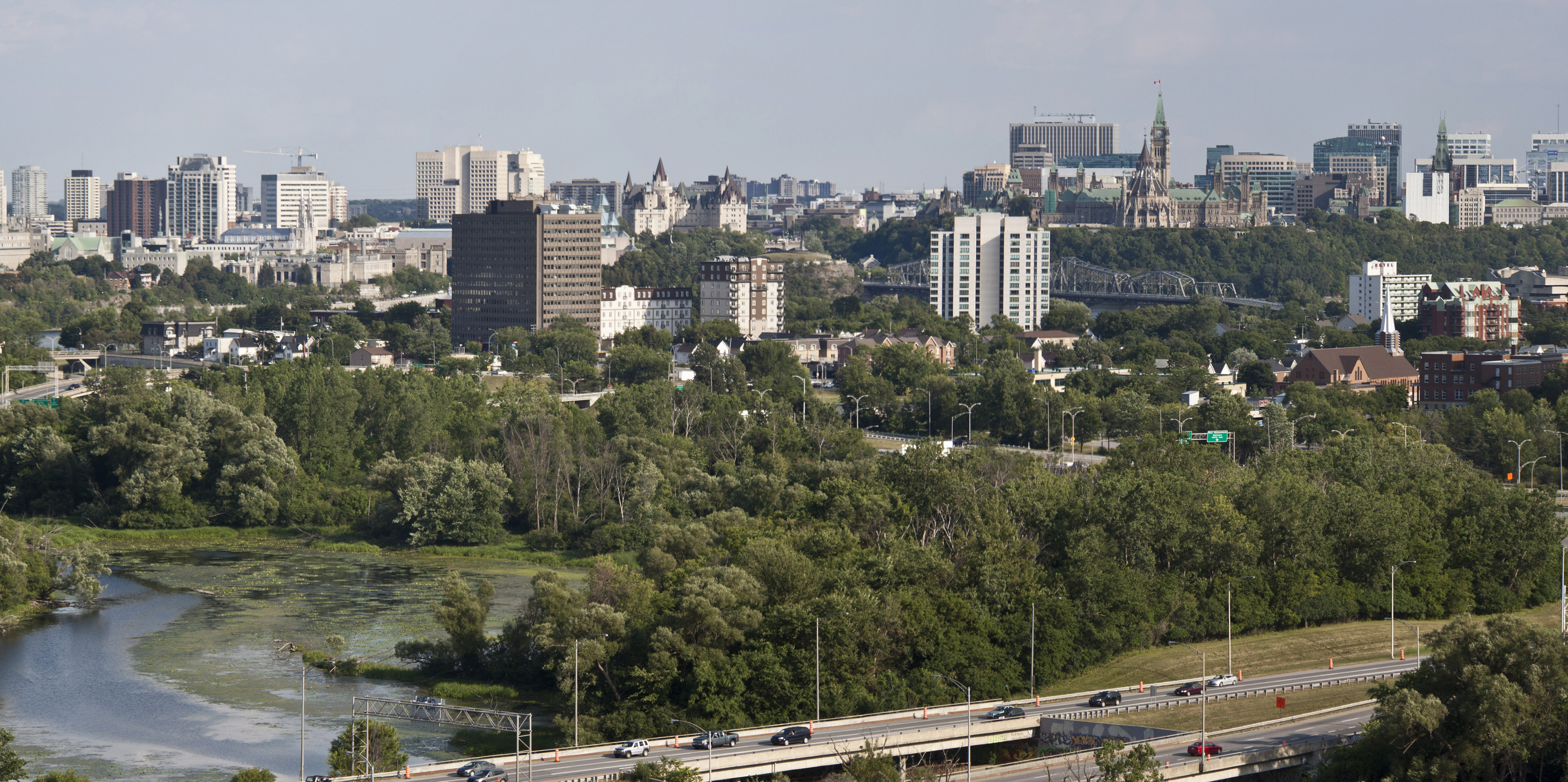
Ottawa

Initial European settlement and colonization of the region occurred in the 17th and 18th centuries by the French and by fur traders as part of the colony of Canada within New France. Étienne Brûlé and Samuel de Champlain were the first colonists to navigate the Ottawa River in 1610 and 1613, respectively. The oldest continually-inhabited European settlement in Eastern Ontario is Kingston, which originated as a pre-European settlement named Cataraqui, and was established as Fort Cataraqui in 1673. The city would eventually serve as Canada's first capital city from 1841 to 1844. Further development occurred under the British as part of the Province of Quebec from 1763 to 1791, and eventually the Province of Upper Canada from 1791 to 1841. Many cities in Eastern Ontario were established as United Empire Loyalist settlements following the American Revolution. The earliest loyalist settlement was Cornwall, originally known as New Johnstown, was established in 1784. Belleville was originally settled as a logging outpost in 1789, known originally as Meyer's Creek. Ottawa was originally settled as Wright's Town and later Bytown in 1800 as an agricultural and logging community. Further development of the community was spurred during the construction of the Rideau Canal, conceived as an alternate waterway bypassing the St. Lawrence River, a vulnerable location to American attacks following the War of 1812. The town was formally established as Ottawa in 1855, and remained inconsequential until it was selected as the permanent capital of Canada by Queen Victoria in 1857. Ottawa was chosen as the capital due to being situated in an isolated area further away from the US-Canada border, with the intention of being more defensible, and as a political compromise between Canada West and Canada East, who each desired Toronto and Montreal to serve as the national capital, respectively.

The region's economy was initially focused largely on the fur trade, forestry, mining, and agriculture when the major cities were all colonial outposts. The dominance of the public sector and government services in both the cities of Ottawa and Kingston emerged during the 19th and 20th centuries, with both serving as historical federal capital cities. Kingston initially served as a major military outpost and operated some of United Canada's earliest major hospitals and prisons. In Ottawa, the Public Service of Canada is the single-largest employer in the city, hosting Parliament Hill, the national headquarters for all major federal departments, and the National Defense Headquarters for the Department of National Defense. The 1980s and 1990s saw the emergence of Silicon Valley North in Ottawa, Canada's original technology cluster, and currently one of the largest in Canada.

== Demographics ==
=== Population ===
Census Region	Population (2021)	Population (2016)	Population (2011)	Population (2006)	Population (2001)	Area (km^{2})
Ottawa (Ontario)	1,017,449	934,243	883,391	812,129	774,072	2,790.31
Frontenac	161,780	150,475	149,738	143,865	138,606	3,336.62
Hastings*	145,746	136,445	134,934	130,474	125,915	5,291.05
Stormont, Dundas and Glengarry	114,637	113,429	111,164	110,399	109,522	3,309.87
Renfrew	106,365	102,394	101,326	97,545	95,138	7,357.94
Leeds and Grenville	104,070	100,546	99,306	99,206	96,606	3,350.08
Prescott and Russell	95,639	89,333	85,381	80,184	76,446	2,004.47
Lanark	75,760	68,698	65,667	63,785	62,495	3,025.98
Lennox and Addington	45,182	42,888	41,824	40,542	39,461	2,839.68
Prince Edward*	25,704	24,735	25,258	25,496	24,901	1,050.45
Total	1,720,882	1,602,006	1,537,797	1,447,655	1,392,376	28,014.95
Total *(incl ext. area)	1,892,332	1,763,186	1,697,989	1,603,625	1,543,192	34,356.45

=== Census metropolitan areas ===
Metropolitan area	Type	Population			Change	Land area (km^{2})	Population density (/km^{2})
Metropolitan area	Type	(2023) Estimate	(2021)	(2016)	Change	Land area (km^{2})	Population density (/km^{2})
Ottawa–Gatineau	CMA	1,609,805	1,488,307	1,371,576	+8.51%	8046.99	185.0
Ottawa (Ontario)	CMA	1,244,997	1,017,449	934,243	+8.90%	2,790.31	364.7
Kingston	CMA	188,267	172,546	161,175	+7.06%	1919.17	89.9
Belleville–Quinte West*	CMA	121,982	111,184	103,401	+7.53%	1337.50	83.1
Cornwall	CA	66,351	61,415	59,699	+2.87%	509.21	120.6
Brockville	CA	33,649	31,661	31,200	+1.48%	576.87	54.9
Pembroke	CA	25,068	23,814	23,269	+2.34%	553.40	43.0
Petawawa	CA	19,464	18,160	17,187	+5.66%	164.70	110.3
Hawkesbury	CA	12,668	12,010	11,974	+0.30%	12.91	930.3
Hawkesbury (Ontario)	CA	10,747	10,194	10,263	−0.67%	10.00	1019.4

=== Administrative divisions ===
==== Single-tier municipalities ====
- City of Ottawa

==== Separated municipalities ====
- City of Belleville*
- City of Brockville
- City of Cornwall
- City of Kingston
- City of Pembroke
- Town of Gananoque
- Town of Prescott
- Town of Smiths Falls

==== Counties ====
- Frontenac County
- Hastings County*
- Lanark County
- United Counties of Leeds and Grenville
- Lennox and Addington County
- United Counties of Prescott and Russell
- Prince Edward County*
- Renfrew County
- United Counties of Stormont, Dundas and Glengarry

== Geography ==
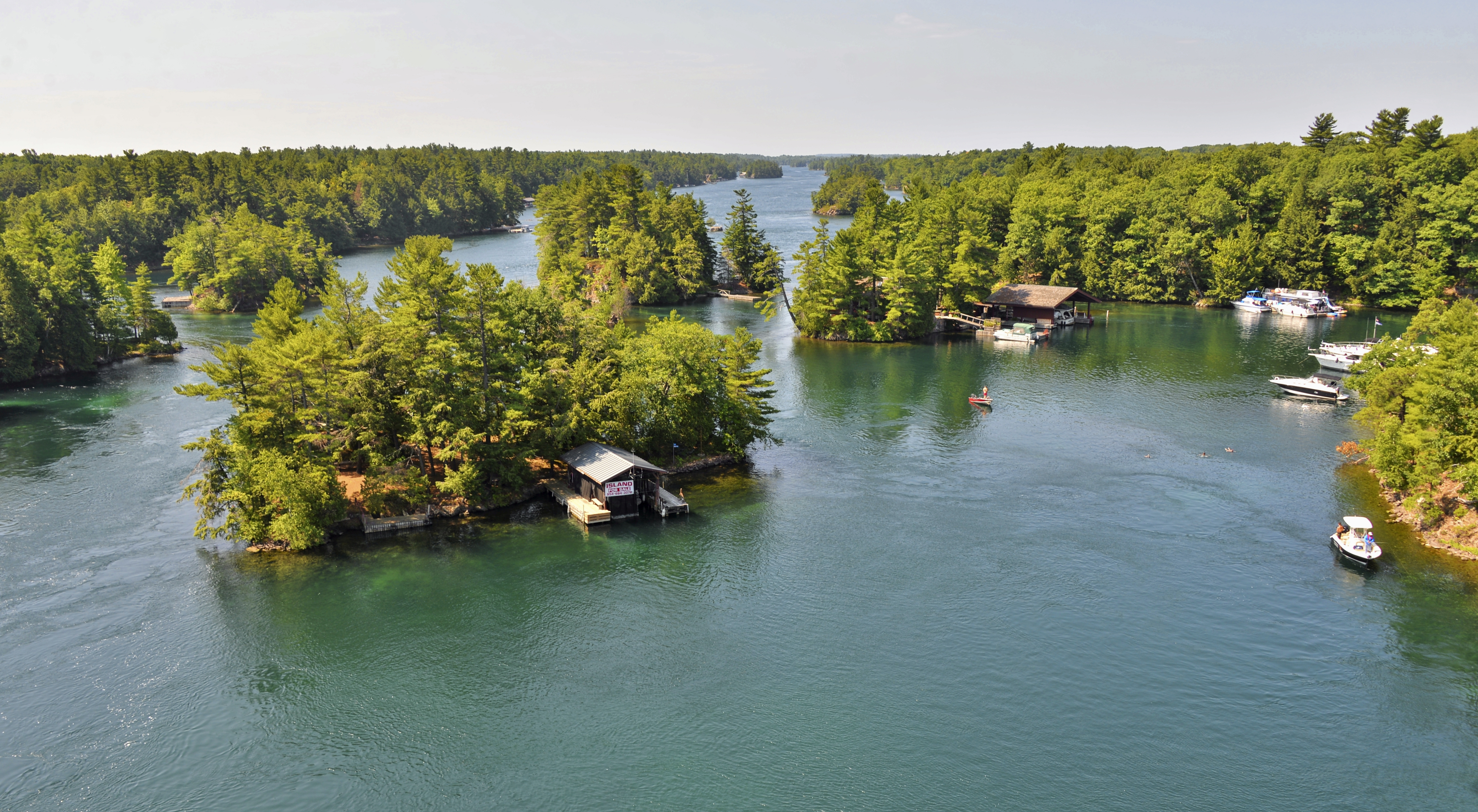
Thousand Islands in the St. Lawrence River

Eastern Ontario is located within both the Mixedwood Plains Ecozone (as classified by Environment and Climate Change Canada, further subclassified into the St. Lawrence Lowland, Frontenac Axis, Manitoulin-Lake Simcoe regions), and Boreal Shield Ecozone (further subclassified into the Algonquin-Lake Nipissing region). Surficial geology largely consists of glacial till, glaciolacustrine and glaciomarine silt/clay plains, and low-lying wetlands underlain by sedimentary limestone, dolostone, siltstone, sandstone, arkose, and shale bedrock, in addition to sections of plutonic igneous granite, quartz, gneiss, and conglomerate bedrock of the Canadian Shield, which is exposed at the surface in many locations. Eastern Ontario's geography is highly varied, with flat plains and rolling hills in the eastern section of the region, near the St. Lawrence River and Lake Ontario, and rugged highland areas in the sections that the Canadian Shield covers, including the Laurentian Highlands and Opeongo Hills, ranging from Algonquin Provincial Park south toward Lake Ontario. The Thousand Islands region is a unique bedrock archipelago in the St. Lawrence River that consists of approximately 1,864 islands straddling the Canada-US border. Geological fault zones run through the region, including the Western Quebec Seismic Zone and the St. Lawrence Rift System. These fault zones result in a graben (Ottawa-Bonnechere Graben) that forms the Ottawa Valley, running the length of the Ottawa River and Mattawa River north to Lake Nipissing. Subsequently, the region is prone to sinkholes and earthquakes. More severe earthquakes (Richter Magnitude scale of 5-6 or greater) occur at a frequency of approximately 60 years on average. The most recent severe earthquake to occur, the 2010 Central Canada Earthquake, caused minor damage to power grid systems and buildings in Ottawa and other nearby areas. Additional major historical earthquakes include the 1944 Cornwall-Massena Earthquake.

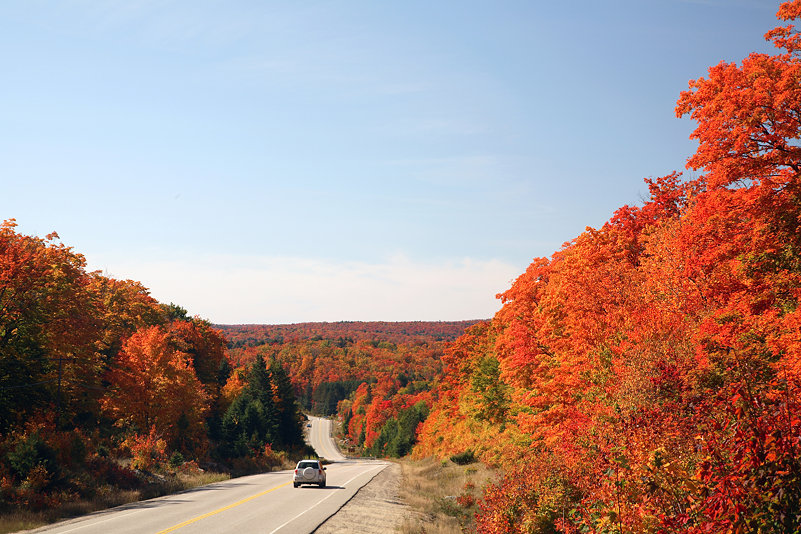
Algonquin Provincial Park

Eastern Ontario maintains significant forest coverage, predominantly in the areas of the Canadian Shield that could not be cleared for agricultural purposes. A singular forest region is located in Eastern Ontario, known as the Great Lakes-St. Lawrence forest. The historical prominence of the logging industry has resulted in significant historical clearing of these forests, but the implementation of more sustainable forestry practices and governmental protections on certain areas has resulted in regrowth and retention of forests on areas not suitable for agriculture. One major federally protected area, Thousand Islands National Park, is located in Eastern Ontario. Multiple provincial parks are also located in the region, with the most significant of which being Algonquin Provincial Park, itself established to encourage sustainable forestry practices after being clearcut in the late 19th century.

== Climate ==
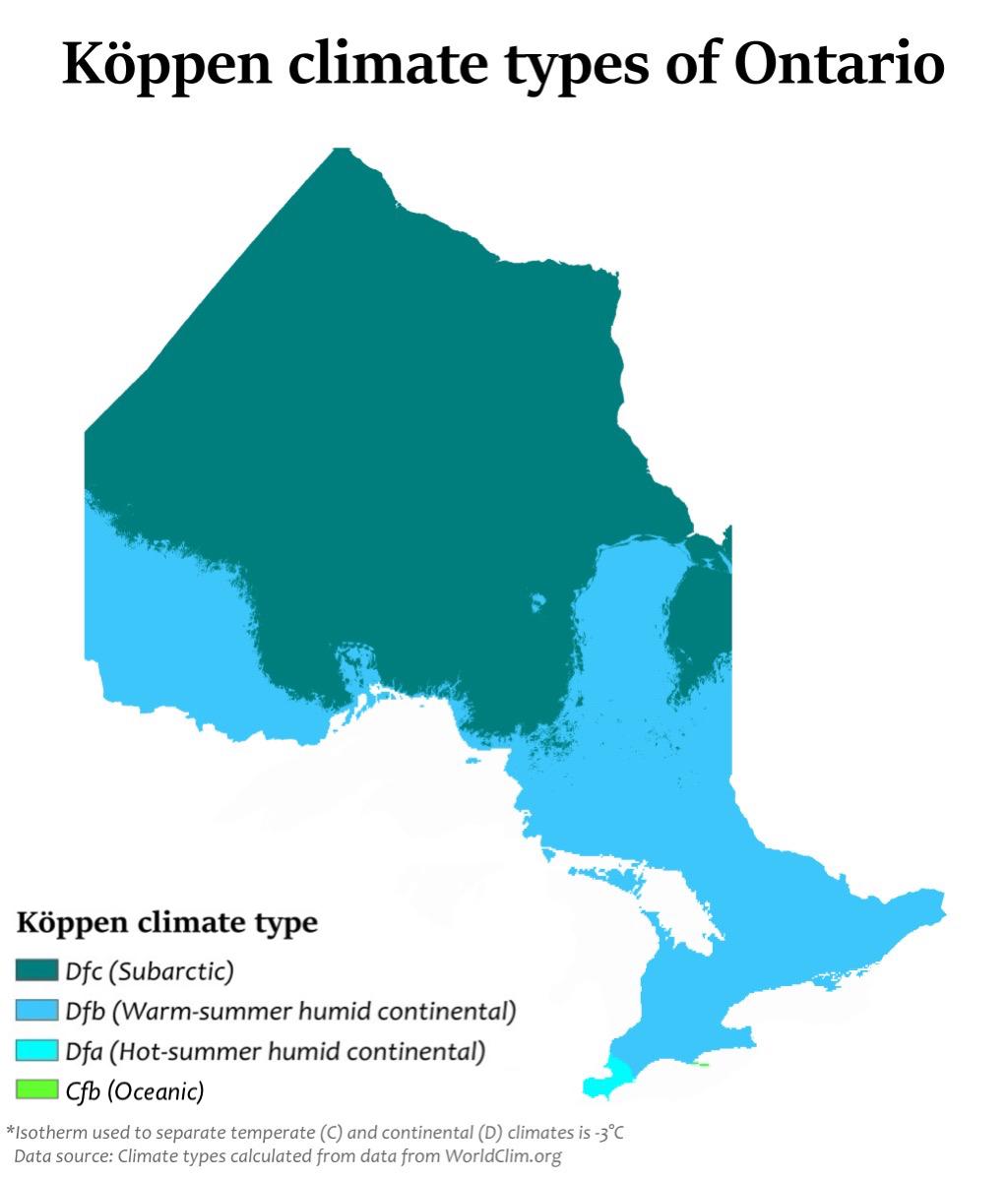
Köppen Climate Map of Ontario

Eastern Ontario's climate is heavily influenced by the proximity of the Great Lakes and its relative northern latitude compared to other parts of Southern Ontario. Winters in the region are typically severe, with regions experiencing low temperatures and significant amounts of snow and ice during winter months. Highland regions experience more severe winters due to their higher elevation. Significant snowfall is common in the area even into the spring. Summers are typically hot and humid in lower-lying areas, with milder and cooler summers occurring in the north. Eastern Ontario also experiences ice storms on a regular basis due to the presence of the arctic high-pressure system, heavily impacting the low-lying areas of the Ottawa Valley and St. Lawrence Valley, with significant events including the 1998 North American Ice Storm and the 2023 Canadian Ice Storm. Eastern Ontario also regularly experiences severe weather events, including tornadoes, and thunderstorms as a result of humid summer temperatures.

Under the Köppen climate classification, Eastern Ontario has a humid continental climate, with the entire area experiencing a warm-summer Dfb climate. Temperatures are warmer along the north shore of Lake Ontario and the St. Lawrence River, in areas such as Prince Edward County, in comparison to the more northern areas of the region.

== Infrastructure ==
=== Roads ===
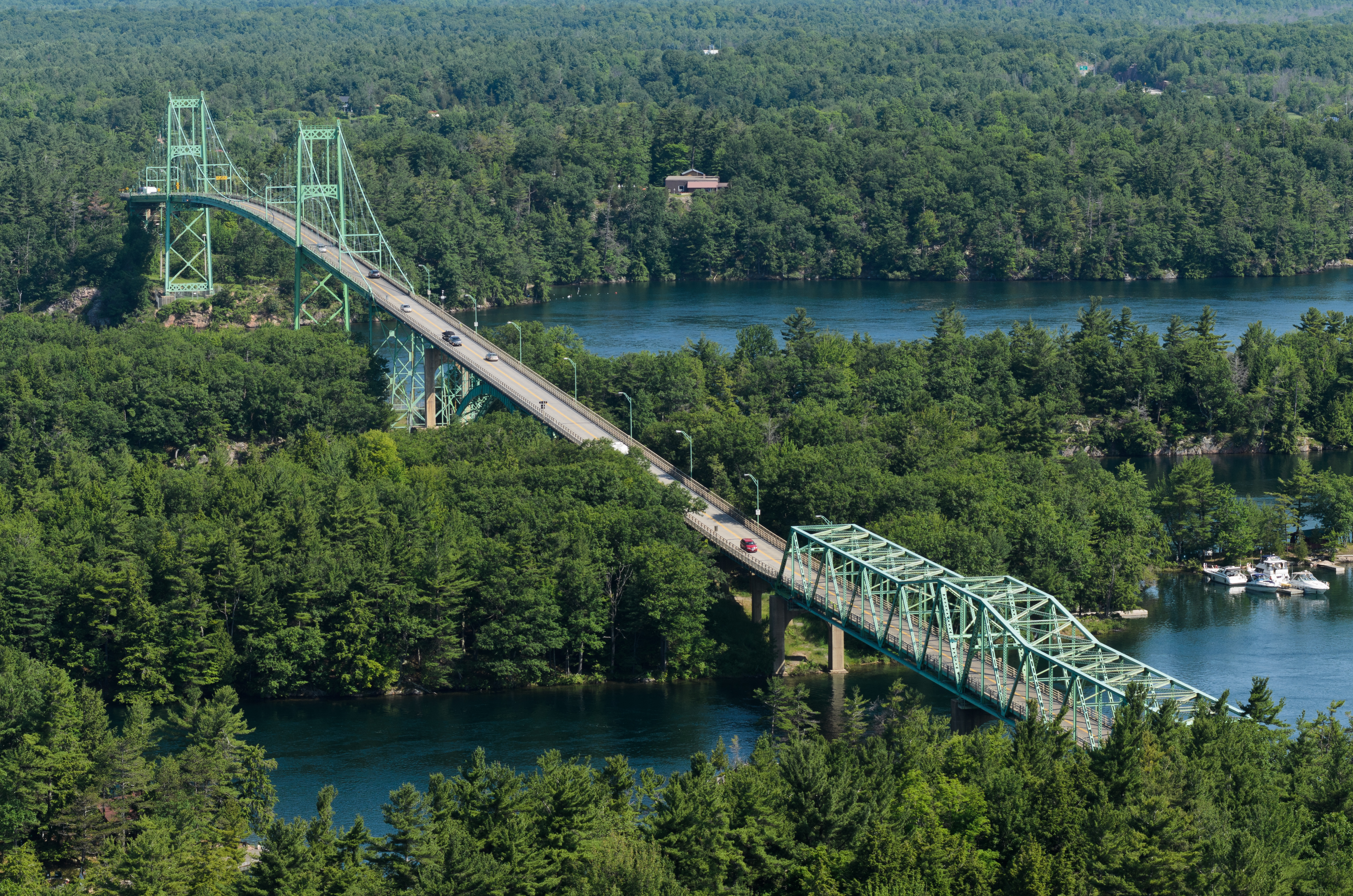
Thousand Islands Bridge near Gananoque

The vast majority of the primary vehicular traffic network in Eastern Ontario is served mainly by the controlled-access 400-series highways. Highway 401, the main highway in the network, starts as a continuation of Autoroute 20 at the Quebec border in South Glengarry and runs southwest to Belleville, where it continues southwest through the Golden Horseshoe and Southwestern Ontario. Highway 416, another major highway, runs north from Highway 401 near Johnstown, where it connects with Highway 417 in Ottawa. Highway 417 starts as a continuation of Autoroute 40 at the Quebec border in East Hawkesbury and runs northwest through Ottawa toward Arnprior, after which it becomes Highway 17. Highways 401 and 417 carry Trans-Canada Highway designations throughout Eastern Ontario. Additional major provincial highways in the region include Highway 7, Highway 15, Highway 16, Highway 33, Highway 37, Highway 62, Highway 137, and Highway 138. An extension of Highway 417 toward Renfrew is under construction as of 2024. In 2024, the province announced that ownership of Highway 174 will be transferred to the provincial government from the city of Ottawa.

Eastern Ontario also has multiple road connections with the United States. These include the Thousand Islands Bridge near Gananoque, the Odgensburg-Prescott International Bridge in Johnstown, and the Seaway International Bridge in Cornwall, all of which cross the St. Lawrence River. Multiple bridges also connect the region with Quebec, including the Champlain Bridge, Chaudiere Bridge, Portage Bridge, Alexandra Bridge, and the MacDonald-Cartier Bridge in Ottawa, and the Long-Sault Bridge in Hawkesbury, all of which cross the Ottawa River. Additional major bridges include the Norris Whitney Bridge in Belleville and the Quinte Skyway near Deseronto, which cross the Bay of Quinte.

=== Rail ===
Via Rail operates inter-regional passenger train service on the Quebec City–Windsor Corridor, in Toronto-Ottawa-Montreal and Toronto-Montreal configurations, running predominantly along the route adjacent to Lake Ontario and the St. Lawrence River toward Montreal, but for trains bound for Ottawa, there is a spur route that runs north of Brockville and through Smiths Falls to Ottawa, as well as an additional line that roughly follows Highway 417 from Ottawa to Quebec. Ottawa is currently the only municipality in Eastern Ontario that has a rail-based transit system in operation. This transit system is known as the O-Train, which as of 2025, has three lines; the east-west Line 1, the north-south Line 2, and the north-south Line 4. Multiple lines are currently under construction as of 2024, including an extension of Line 1 Confederation, an extension/reconstruction of Line 2 Trillium, a new Line 3 Confederation spur, and a new Line 4 Airport Link, which connects the transit system to Ottawa MacDonald-Cartier International Airport. Additional future extensions of the O-Train system are planned for Barrhaven and Kanata, and connections with the proposed Gatineau tramway are also planned. A proposed commuter rail system called Letsgomoose that would extend as far as Arnprior, Smiths Falls, and Alexandria in Ontario, as well as Bristol, La Peche, and Montebello in Quebec, was initially proposed in 2007 by a private company called Moose Consortium Inc., but no movement has been made on the proposal since 2017.

Freight rail in the region is dominated by CN Rail and CPKC, the two major cross-national Canadian rail companies.

=== Waterways ===
Eastern Ontario does not have any major ports. While cargo ships transit through the region as part of the Great Lakes/St. Lawrence Seaway system, most major port activities are located upstream in Thunder Bay, Windsor, and Hamilton, or downstream in Montreal and Quebec City. Minor ports are located in Belleville, Picton, Bath, and Kingston.

The Ontario government currently operates passenger ferry services connecting Kingston to Wolfe Island. Other smaller locally-operated ferry services provide transit through the Thousand Islands on the Canadian side of the St. Lawrence River.

=== Airports ===
Eastern Ontario is home to only one major airport; Ottawa MacDonald-Cartier International Airport (YOW), in addition to multiple minor airports in either Ottawa or various smaller communities, such as Kingston Norman Rogers Airport (YKR), Pembroke & Area Airport (YTA), and Rockliffe Airport (YRO). Ottawa International Airport is a major airport in the Canadian transportation network and offers flights to many major cities across Canada, in addition to select cities in the United States and the Caribbean. Additionally, a major Canadian Forces base, CFB Trenton (YTR), is located in Trenton and is operated by the Royal Canadian Air Force.

== Education ==
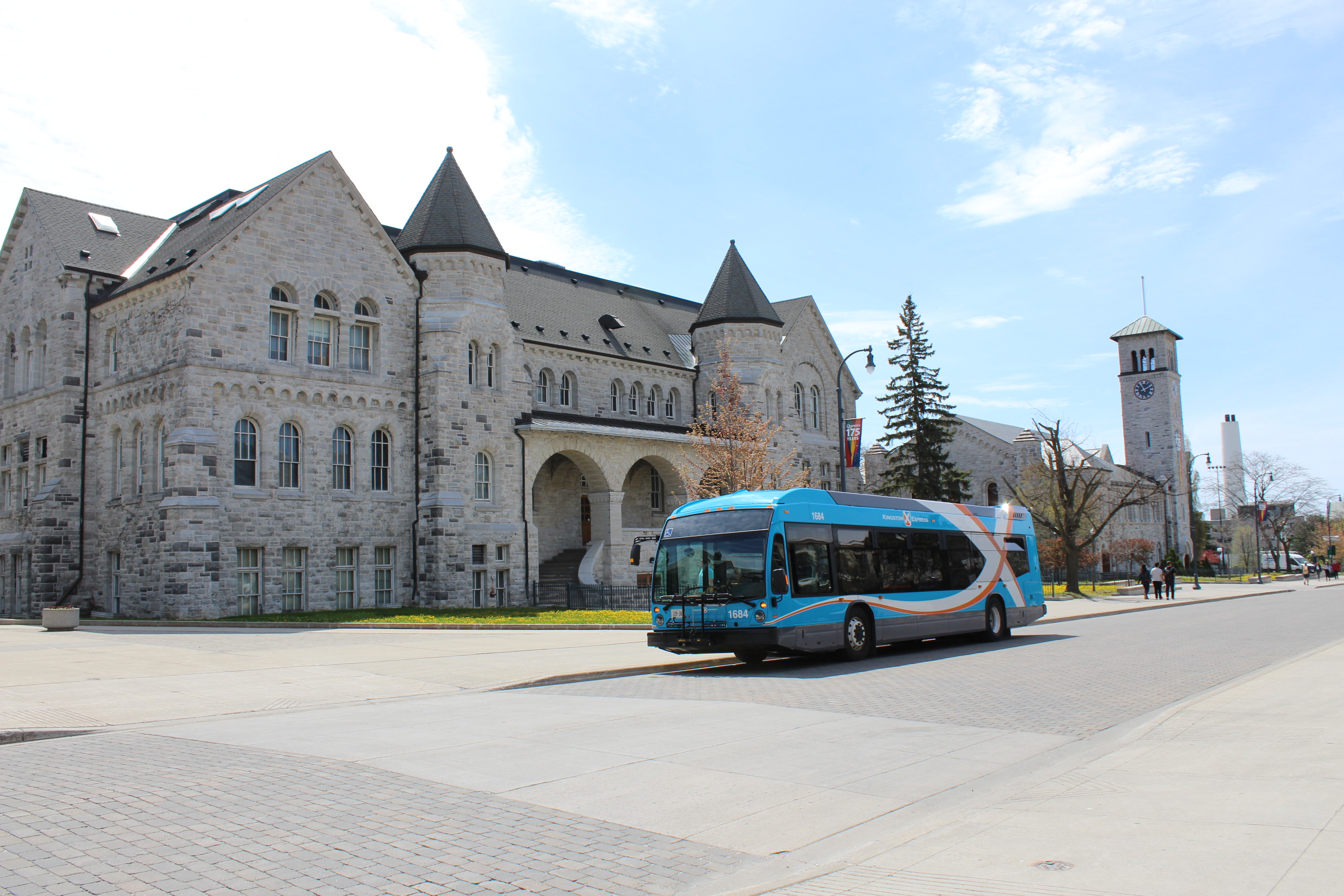
Queen's University in Kingston

Eastern Ontario has multiple tertiary education institutions in the form of both universities and colleges. Two universities, University of Ottawa and Queen's University, are part of the U15 Group, the association of Canada's dominant research universities.

=== Universities ===
- Carleton University, founded in 1942 in Ottawa;
- Queen's University, founded in 1841 in Kingston;
- Royal Military College of Canada, founded in 1876 in Kingston;
- University of Ottawa, founded in 1848 in Ottawa;
  - Saint Paul University, founded in 1848 in Ottawa;

=== Colleges ===
- Algonquin College, founded in 1967 in Ottawa;
  - Additional campuses in Carleton Place, Hawkesbury, Perth, Pembroke, and Renfrew;
- Collège La Cité, founded in 1989 in Ottawa;
  - Additional campus in Hawkesbury;
- Loyalist College, founded in 1967 in Belleville;
  - Additional campuses in Bancroft and Tyendinaga Mohawk Territory;
- St. Lawrence College, founded in 1967 in Kingston;
  - Additional campuses in Brockville and Cornwall.

== Culture ==
=== Language ===
The accent/dialect in the region, Ottawa Valley English, is distinct from the rest of Ontario. The region also has a significant Francophone population, encompassing approximately 15.4% of the Eastern Ontario population and 43.1% of all Franco-Ontarians as of 2022, owing to the region's historical roots in French colonization and proximity to Quebec.

=== Sports ===
Eastern Ontario has a rich professional sports scene, largely centred on Ottawa, where two "Big Six" teams (MLB, NBA, NFL, NHL, MLS, and CFL) currently play - the Ottawa Senators of the NHL, and the Ottawa Redblacks of the CFL. The Ottawa Charge of the PWHL also play in the city, in addition to multiple other additional professional franchises from other leagues, including the AHL, CEBL, CPL, and NLL. Additional professional hockey teams were previously located in the region, including in the NHA's (the predecessor of the modern NHL) Renfrew Creamery Kings, and the WHA's (which later merged with the modern NHL) Ottawa Civics and Ottawa Nationals. Historical Canadian football teams from the ORFU and QRFU included the Brockville Football Club, Kingston Granites, and Ottawa Trojans. The history of professional sports in the Ottawa region has long been tumultuous and saw professional franchises leave the city on multiple occasions, including the original Ottawa Senators of the NHL, being founded in 1883 and relocating in 1934, the Ottawa Rough Riders of the CFL, being founded in 1876 and folding in 1996, and the Ottawa Renegades of the CFL, being founded in 2002 and folding in 2008.

A bid for a Major League Soccer franchise was made by former Ottawa Senators owner Eugene Melnyk in 2010, with intention of constructing a new stadium in Kanata. The Ottawa bid was ultimately rejected in favour of the Portland Timbers and Vancouver Whitecaps expansion teams.

==== Active ====
Club	Sport	League	Level	City	Stadium	Years active
Ottawa Senators	Ice hockey	NHL	Professional	Ottawa	Canadian Tire Centre	1992–present
Ottawa Charge	Ice hockey	PWHL	Professional	Ottawa	TD Place Arena	2023–present
Belleville Senators	Ice hockey	AHL	Professional	Belleville	CAA Arena	2017–present
Ottawa Titans	Baseball	FL	Professional	Ottawa	Ottawa Stadium	2020–present
Ottawa Blackjacks	Basketball	CEBL	Professional	Ottawa	TD Place Arena	2019–present
Ottawa Redblacks	Football	CFL	Professional	Ottawa	TD Place Stadium	2014–present
Ottawa Black Bears	Lacrosse	NLL	Professional	Ottawa	Canadian Tire Centre	2024–present
Atletico Ottawa	Soccer	CPL	Professional	Ottawa	TD Place Stadium	2020–present
Kingston Frontenacs	Ice hockey	OHL	Major Junior	Kingston	Slush Puppie Place	1989–present
Ottawa 67's	Ice hockey	OHL	Major Junior	Ottawa	TD Place Arena	1967–present

==== Former ====
Club	Sport	League	Level	City	Stadium	Years active
Ottawa Skyhawks	Basketball	NBLC	Professional	Ottawa	Canadian Tire Centre	2014
Ottawa Giants	Baseball	IL (AAA)	Pro-Minor	Ottawa	Lansdowne Park	1951
Ottawa Athletics	Baseball	IL (AAA)	Pro-Minor	Ottawa	Lansdowne Park	1952 - 1954
Ottawa Lynx	Baseball	IL (AAA)	Pro-Minor	Ottawa	Ottawa Stadium	1993 - 2007
Ottawa Voyageurs	Baseball	CA (Ind)	Pro-Minor	Ottawa	Ottawa Stadium	2008 - 2009
Ottawa Champions	Baseball	CA (Ind)	Pro-Minor	Ottawa	Ottawa Stadium	2015 - 2019
Ottawa Senators	Ice hockey	NHL	Professional	Ottawa	Ottawa Auditorium	1909 - 1934
Renfrew Creamery Kings	Ice hockey	NHA	Professional	Renfrew	Renfrew Hockey Arena	1909-1911
Ottawa Nationals	Ice hockey	WHA	Professional	Ottawa	Ottawa Civic Centre	1972 - 1973
Ottawa Civics	Ice hockey	WHA	Professional	Ottawa	Ottawa Civic Centre	1976
Cornwall Aces	Ice hockey	AHL	Professional	Cornwall	Ed Lumley Arena	1993 - 1996
Hull-Ottawa Canadiens	Ice hockey	EPHL	Pro-Minor	Ottawa	Ottawa Auditorium	1959 - 1963
Kingston Frontenacs	Ice hockey	EPHL	Pro-Minor	Kingston	Kingston Memorial Centre	1959 - 1963
Ottawa Lady Senators	Ice hockey	CWHL	Pro-Am	Ottawa	Ottawa Civic Centre	2007 - 2010
Ottawa Rough Riders	Football	CFL	Professional	Ottawa	Lansdowne Park	1876 - 1996
Ottawa Renegades	Football	CFL	Professional	Ottawa	Lansdowne Park	2002 - 2006
Brockville Football Club	Football	QRFU	Pro-Am	Brockville	Unknown	1899 - 1902
Kingston Granites	Football	ORFU	Pro-Am	Kingston	Unknown	1898 - 1903
Ottawa Trojans	Football	ORFU	Pro-Am	Ottawa	Lansdowne Park	1943 - 1948
Ottawa Fury FC	Soccer	USLC	Professional	Ottawa	TD Place Stadium	2011 - 2019
Kingston Clippers	Soccer	L1O	Semi-Pro Minor	Kingston	Tindall Field	2014 - 2016
Ottawa South United	Soccer	L1O	Semi-Pro Minor	Ottawa	Quinn's Pointe	2017 - 2019
Belleville Bulls	Ice hockey	OHL	Major Junior	Belleville	Yardmen Arena	1981 - 2015
Cornwall Royals	Ice hockey	OHL	Major Junior	Cornwall	Ed Lumley Arena	1969 - 1992
