= Lansdowne Park redevelopment =

History of public project

Coordinates: 45.399166°N 75.683119°W

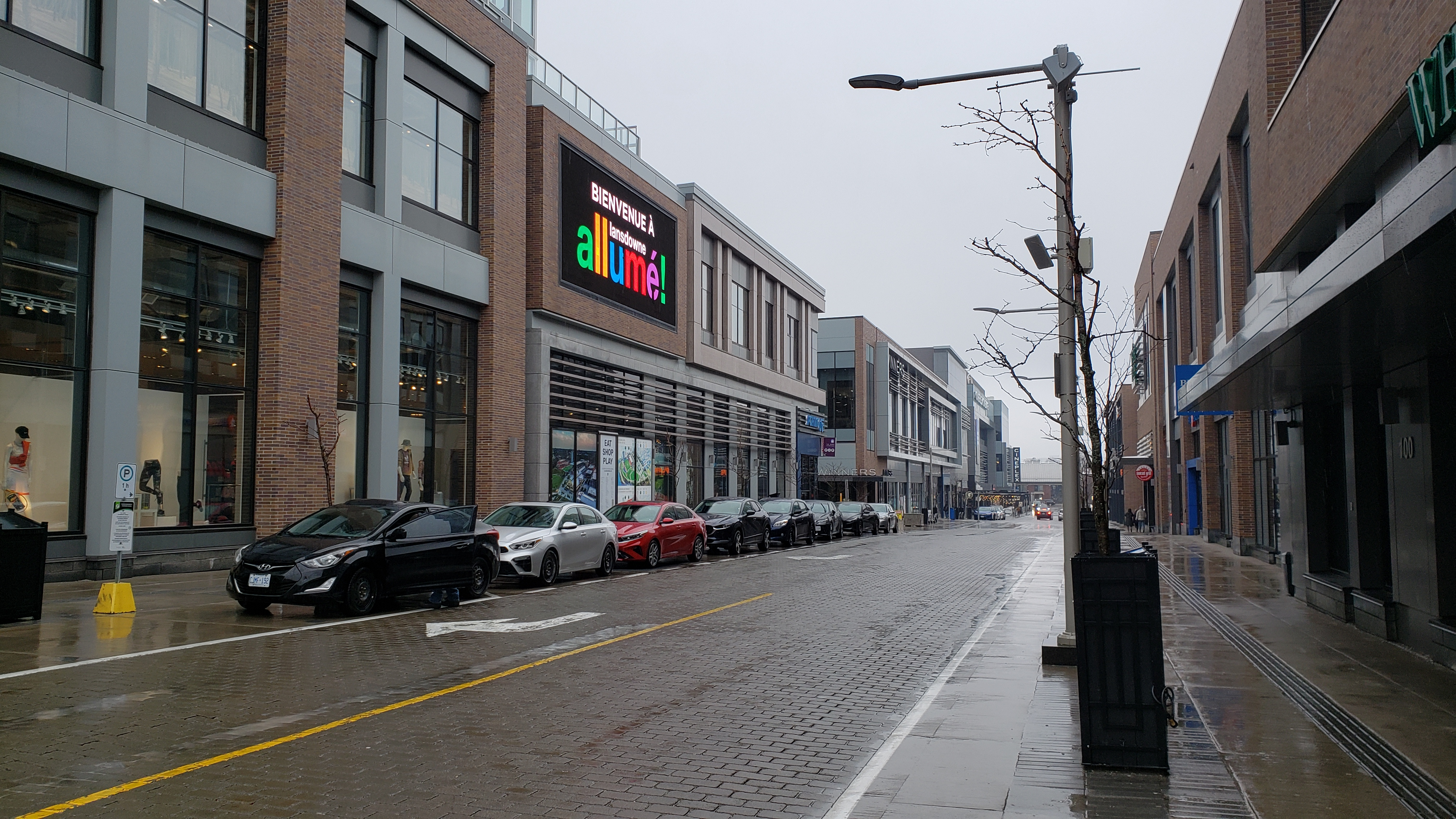
Marché Way, a street part of Lansdowne Live, an entertainment and retail area created as part of the Lansdowne Park redevelopment

The Lansdowne Park redevelopment was a public-private partnership redevelopment of the Lansdowne Park fairgrounds in Ottawa, Ontario, Canada. In September 2007, cracks were discovered in Frank Clair Stadium, and a portion of the south-side stands was demolished due to safety concerns. The City of Ottawa subsequently initiated an international design competition to redevelop Lansdowne Park. However, it suspended the competition when a group of Ottawa businessmen known as the Ottawa Sports and Entertainment Group (OSEG), who had been awarded a Canadian Football League franchise on the condition of securing a home venue in Ottawa, proposed a public-private partnership with the City to rebuild the stadium and redevelop the grounds with residential and commercial uses to finance the reconstruction and annual upkeep of the site. Ottawa City Council entered into a partnership with the OSEG group and cancelled its competitive process.

The redevelopment plan was split into two components after the City rejected the portion of the OSEG proposal regarding lands bordering the Rideau Canal. OSEG was assigned the precinct around the Stadium and along Bank Street, while a design competition was held for an 'urban park' to be located along the Canal. The OSEG plan envisioned two towers along Bank Street, new football stadium grandstands, and a new residential and commercial district to the north of the Stadium.

The redevelopment plan was opposed by some Ottawa residents, particularly those near the Lansdowne site. Heritage activists objected to a plan to move the heritage building on the site as its reassembly was in doubt. A court challenge was held in Ontario Superior Court, contending that the City illegally proceeded with the sole-source project. Opponents proposed opening up the redevelopment to a public tender. Other alternatives proposed including building a football stadium at another more suitable location and organizing the park reconstruction solely as a public process. Appeals to the Ontario Municipal Board and the Ontario Superior Court were rejected. An appeal to the Ontario Court of Appeal was launched in September 2011 and dismissed in April 2012. The City of Ottawa started construction in 2012, and anticipated the completion in 2015.

== Existing condition ==
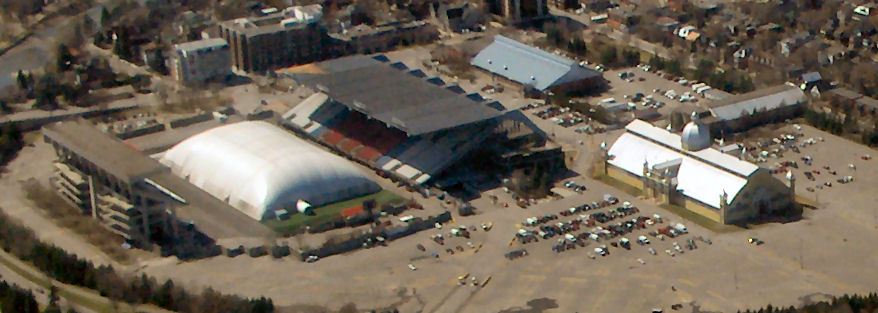
By 2008, almost the entire surface of Lansdowne Park was paved for parking. View of Lansdowne Park in 2008 from east.

By the 1990s, Lansdowne Park had mostly been paved over and the city-owned site was operating at a significant deficit. The grounds were used for the annual SuperEx fair and parking for visitors to the arena and football complex and not much more. The condition of the site had sparked the City to ask for private proposals to rejuvenate the site. A proposal was received to convert most of the lands into a residential development, retain the Aberdeen Pavilion and Civic Centre and return money to the City of Ottawa. Because of a public outcry, the redevelopment plan was abandoned, and the property transferred to the Region of Ottawa-Carleton, keeping the property in the public domain. The Aberdeen Pavilion received a facelift and parklands in the north-east quadrant were improved, but the rest of the site was left "as-is". After the Food Pavilion was torn down, the SuperEx itself was looking for another site, and the fair commission agreed to leave after its lease expired.

== Park review ==
In October 2007, the City decided for a second time to initiate a redevelopment of Lansdowne Park. This was partly due to the condition of the lower south grandstand of the stadium, which had been found to have structural problems. Ottawa mayor Larry O'Brien suggested that local developers be invited to submit proposals to redevelop the area. Ottawa councillors Peter Hume and Clive Doucet opposed the idea and proposed a design competition for the site, which Council approved, entitled "Design Lansdowne". By January 2008, a web site was set up for public consultation. The goal of the public consultation would be a report by the City which would detail what the future Lansdowne Park was to contain. A request for proposals would then be made for bidding by outside developers, who would construct the project, under a "right to develop" contract. The Ottawa Regional Society of Architects criticized the plan, suggesting it was not a true design competition. In the City process, developers would hire architects to build to their specifications, while a 'true' design competition would see design firms and architects create designs first, which would then be judged by a jury to determine the best solution. The City would then put out tenders for construction.

Public consultations for the first stage were concluded by May 2008. City of Ottawa staff then began developing a report for Council. Before completing the Request for Proposal, the Design Lansdowne process was suspended in June 2008 while studies were done whether the Stadium and arena were worth saving. It was determined that the Civic Centre and the main grandstands of Frank Clair Stadium were sound, but the lower south-side grandstand of the stadium, built in 1960, would have to be replaced. The City proceeded to demolish the condemned lower grandstand, using a controlled implosion, in July 2008.

== Lansdowne Live/Lansdowne Partnership Plan ==
In March 2008, the Ottawa Sports and Entertainment Group (OSEG), which includes: Jeff Hunt, owner of the Ottawa 67's; developer Minto Group's chairman, Roger Greenberg; expatriate property developer billionaire Bill Shenkman; and John Ruddy, president of shopping centre developer, Trinity Development Group, were awarded a conditional Canadian Football League (CFL) expansion franchise contingent on securing a suitable stadium and needed Frank Clair Stadium to be renovated. In the fall of 2007, the OSEG group had announced that it would seek the CFL franchise, and intended to play in an upgraded Frank Clair Stadium, with private boxes and other amenities. The stadium plan sketched out the use of a residential and commercial component to pay for the upgrades.

Supporters of the design consultation process, notably Glebe Community Association president Bob Brocklebank, were concerned that this would overturn the work done so far on developing a plan for the park, urged the city to continue with the consultation process. However, in May 2008, the City decided to suspend the design consultation to determine the OSEG's needs for the facility. The suspension upset the Glebe Association and Capital Ward councillor Clive Doucet, and prompted Mayor O'Brien to muse "whether or not the city wants or needs a sports stadium on the prime real estate site at all." Results of a survey of Ottawans showed strong support for a public redevelopment of the Park not tied to a professional sports franchise, although a majority of respondents were in favour of retention of the stadium.

The determination process became more complicated when, in September 2008, the Ottawa Senators organization (Senators Sports & Entertainment (SSE)) approached the city about building a soccer-specific stadium on city-owned land in Kanata, near Canadian Tire Centre, (which was called Scotiabank Place then). The land, being used as a snow dump, would house a 20,000 seat stadium, with 30,000 for concerts, and utilize the parking spaces of Scotiabank Place. The stadium was to house a Major League Soccer professional franchise which the Senators group was bidding for.

On October 17, 2008, the OSEG group publicly announced their Lansdowne Live! plan to revitalize Lansdowne Park by redeveloping the entire site in a public-private partnership with the City. The Lansdowne Live proposal envisioned rebuilding Frank Clair Stadium to support not only Canadian Football, but also professional soccer. The remaining south side stands would be torn down and new stands built, while the north side stands would be renovated. Early versions of the plan included practice baseball fields, soccer pitches, a Koi pond, a walk-through aquarium in Aberdeen Pavilion and an outdoor amphitheatre. The plan eventually focused on enhancing the park portion of the site renovating the Civic Centre and adding a commercial element that would help fund the stadium renovations. Exhibition space would be moved off the site to a new facility. Whether the Farmer's Market would remain at the site was unclear.

Opponents of the OSEG proposal, notably Clive Doucet, councillor for the surrounding district, were concerned that alternative proposals were not being accepted via a design competition. Doucet attempted to get Council's support to restart the Design Lansdowne process, but was unsuccessful. Opponents were concerned about a lack of parking, public transportation access and the cost to the City. The OSEG proposal would require the city to spend $129.3 million to renovate the stadium and for its share of the parking. OSEG would commit $117.3 million for the construction of retail and residential condominiums on the site. OSEG would own the new commercial development and operate the stadium, with a portion of the revenues directed back to the city. The new retail and residential would be subject to property taxes.

During the early months of 2009, the City of Ottawa considered both proposals. The staff of the City of Ottawa presented a report to Council on the merits of the Soccer Stadium and Lansdowne proposals. The City held public hearings based on the report, which questioned the necessity of the spending, but gave a slight edge to the Lansdowne proposal. Councillors attempted to find out whether the SSE group would support sharing their stadium with a planned CFL franchise, but the SSE group rejected the possibility. Lansdowne Live proponents made it clear that an MLS team, or another pro soccer team, such as one in the United Soccer League (USL) could play at Frank Clair Stadium.

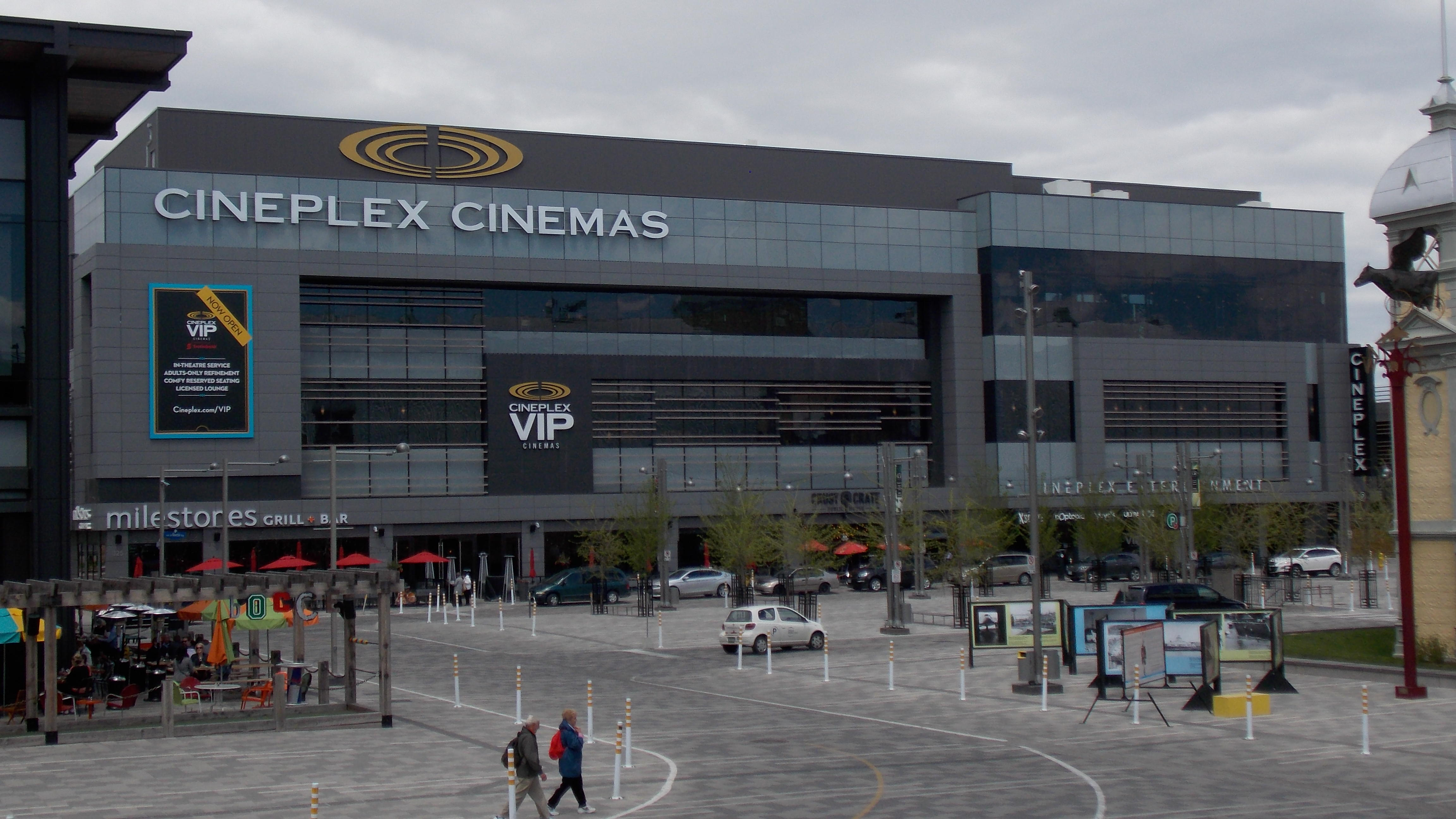
Cineplex Cinemas Lansdowne & VIP opened on March 27, 2015

On April 22, 2009, City Council voted to go ahead and work with the Lansdowne group instead of the Kanata group. City Council voted to enter into sole-source negotiations with the Lansdowne Live group by a vote of 14–9. Council imposed conditions on the negotiations, including preserving the farmer's market, turning a substantial portion of the site into greenspace and public use areas, no big-box stores and city approval for any buildings.

After public information sessions and two days of hearings at Ottawa City Hall, the Lansdowne Live proposal was approved in principle by Ottawa City Council on November 16, 2009 by a vote of 15–9, with several conditions. Approval was contingent on transportation and retail studies as well as a plan for the relocation of the exhibition facilities. Design of the park portion of the site would be subject to a design competition. A design review board would be created, headed by urban designer George Dark, to oversee the design elements of the site.

In February 2010, the City of Ottawa, the National Capital Commission and Parks Canada made a call for proposals for the urban park design. The proposal received 21 expressions of interest from architectural firms for the development, including several from the United States and one from England. Five of the firms were selected to develop design proposals.

The five plans for the 'urban park' were unveiled on May 21, 2010. Plans included several controversial elements such as re-routing some water from the Canal into the site, a proposal that would be in conflict with the Canal's UN heritage designation. All included extensive greenspace and some included public space around the Aberdeen Pavilion for gatherings. Costs ranged from $32.8 million to $88 million. The jury deliberated until June 8 before choosing the "Win-Place-Show" proposal developed by Vancouver landscape architects Phillips Farevaag Smallenberg. The Win-Place-Show proposal created extensive greenspace and preserved Sylvia Holden Park. The proposal did not include the moving of the Horticulture Building to the east of the Aberdeen Pavilion. It included a modification of the canal frontage and a bridge over the canal that were considered unlikely to be built.

On May 27, OSEG revealed an updated design for the OSEG section of the redevelopment. The plan included new south side stands, wrapped in a wooden outer shell. A new translucent roof would be built over the north and south seating. Botanical gardens would connect the back of the south stands with the pathways along the canal. A new facade for the hockey arena would include retail. New town houses would be built along the northern edge of the site on Holmwood Avenue, with pathways and courtyards that connect into the Lansdowne site. Two residential towers would be built on the Bank Street frontage, expected to be 12 to 14 storeys, sitting atop a podium. The plan included an esplanade of terraced trees and gardens running the length of Bank Street, with retail space. The plan plans to move the Horticulture Building to the east of the Aberdeen Pavilion, to house either the farmer's market or a Parks Canada interpretation centre of the Rideau Canal.

On June 28, 2010, after reviewing several studies on the proposal, City of Ottawa Council voted to proceed with sole source negotiations with OSEG. The next step would be to develop a plan that merged the urban park with the OSEG residential and commercial plans. The urban park plan did not include moving the Horticulture Building, and saved some space for the farmer's market beside the Aberdeen Pavilion, that the OSEG plan would build as retail. The plan would be ready in the fall of 2010. The Council voted to preserve the sector known as "Lansdowne Community Park", east of O'Connor and south of Fifth Avenue.

In September 2010, Council voted to rezone the lands of Lansdowne Park for the OSEG redevelopment. The move, approved at committee by the tie-breaking vote of mayor O'Brien, included the lands of Sylvia Holden Park along Bank Street and Holmwood Avenue. The City considers the park to be part of Lansdowne and not a park in its own right. The decommissioning of a park in Ottawa requires a 2/3 Council vote in favour. The park is to be redeveloped with four-storey condominiums along Holmwood and a tower at Bank Street. The Holden park land includes green space along Holmwood and landscaping along Bank Street.

On September 28, the OSEG group announced the addition of the Ottawa Fury to the partnership. The Fury bid for a professional franchise in the North American Soccer League, after having operated a semi-professional team in the PDL. The Fury started play in 2014.

On September 29, the City posted the site control plan for the merged OSEG and urban park plans on the Lansdowne Partnership Plan web site. The plan proposes to move the Horticultural Building east of the Aberdeen Pavilion. The Ottawa Farmer's Market would be relocated to a 'Aberdeen Square' public square north of the Aberdeen Pavilion.

The City held a public meeting on its site control plan on October 14. Later in October, the municipal election was held and Lansdowne Park was one of the issues, both locally in Capital Ward and across the city in the vote for mayor. Opponent Clive Doucet was defeated for mayor, while former Ottawa mayor Jim Watson, who promised to continue the redevelopment process, was elected to become the new Ottawa mayor.

The site plan was approved at Ottawa City Council on November 22, 2010. Final Council approval is expected in summer 2011. According to Ottawa councillor Jan Harder, the site plan itself is not contestable. There are however 14 cases before the Ontario Municipal Board that will come before the courts in April 2011. According to OSEG principal John Pugh, the stadium is expected to be ready for June 2013.

By April 2011, more objections had accumulated to the plan to be heard at an Ontario Municipal Board hearing on the plan. The city reached a mediated settlement with most of the objectors. The revised plan would remove mid-rise buildings from Holmwood Avenue, reduce the heights of over buildings on the site, provide some park space on Holmwood and add some traffic restrictions. Several objectors were left and the OMB hearing proceeded. On June 15, 2011, the OMB decision was published, in favour of the city.

Revised plans were released on February 7, 2012. The plans would include three times the amount of greenspace originally planned as well 900 trees. The stadium would have a capacity of 24,000 all-seaters, which at the time would have been the smallest CFL stadium (although Tim Hortons Field for the CFL Tiger-Cats would have a similar size capacity, with each stadium under the League's preferred minimum of 25,000 seats).

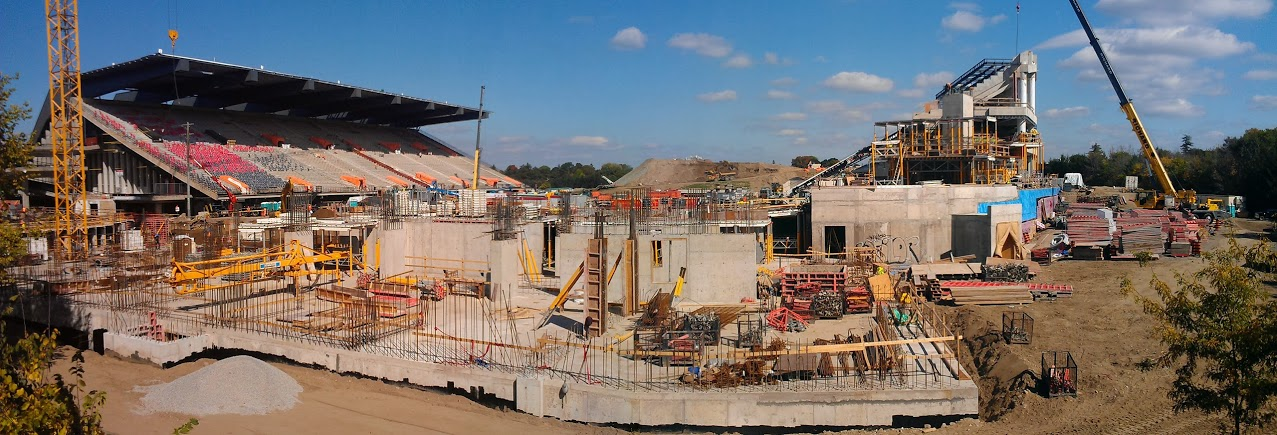
The progress of construction at Frank Clair Stadium on September 27, 2013

=== Development ===
After the failed legal challenge and an Ontario Municipal Board hearing on the redevelopment, construction on the stadium was delayed to 2012, with planned completion of the stadium in time for the 2014 season, and completion of the complete project in 2015. Final designs for the retail, parking garage, site servicing, horticulture building, stadium and urban park are expected to be issued in December 2011 or January 2012. Construction on the stadium and parking garage were scheduled are to commence in June 2012, construction on the mixed-use building moved to January 2013, and construction of the urban park moved to June 2014.

The mixed-use portion, overseen by Ottawa-based developer Trinity Development Group, totaled 360,000 sq.ft.

After approval by Council of the updated plan in August 2011, the City posted a request for developers to handle the development of 280 residential units and the office building. The request deadline concluded on November 15, 2011. The City awarded two contracts, totalling CA$0.7 million (equivalent to $1 million in 2025), for engineering services to move the Horticulture Building.

In May 2012, the City awarded contracts to proceed with development. The first, to EllisDon to demolish the Coliseum, build a new foundation for the Horticulture Building and excavate and remediate any contaminated soil for $7.5 million (equivalent to $10.1 million in 2025), was expected to be complete by November 2012. A second contract, valued at $6.5 million (equivalent to $8.8 million in 2025), to CDS Building Movers, to relocate the Horticulture Building was also awarded. The move was to be complete by March 2013.

The football and soccer stadium redevelopment was completed in time for the Ottawa Redblacks and Ottawa Fury home openers in July 2014. The urban park, officially "Lansdowne Park", was opened in August 2014, although some facilities such as the playground and skate park needed further work. The urban park opening included the moved and renovated Horticulture Building.

By 2017, the redevelopment had been completed

== Other proposals ==
=== Vitally Ottawa – Absolument Ottawa ===
In August 2009, Glebe businessman John E. Martin, made a proposal to build a new stadium and library/cultural centre on city-owned property on Bayview Avenue in Mechanicsville. At Lansdowne Park, Frank Clair Stadium North Stands would be kept and refurbished, the hockey arena retained and the South stands taken down and left down, heritage buildings would be kept in place, renovated and converted into retail and service-related space and the rest of the site greened with a concert shell, horticulture area and outdoor pool. The Bayview site, contaminated from use as a rail yard, would have to be decontaminated.

=== Lansdowne Park Conservancy ===
Depiction of LPC proposal

The Lansdowne Park Conservancy (LPC) proposal and competitive bid was established in March 2010 to provide an alternative option to the sole-sourced OSEG plan. The goal of the LPC is to preserve Lansdowne Park as a 100% public space for the enjoyment of present and future generations. Lansdowne Park would be managed under a nonprofit management model with a volunteer board modeled after the successful Central Park Conservancy in New York. The Conservancy proposes working in partnership with the City of Ottawa. Under the proposal, the City of Ottawa retains full ownership of the land. According to LPC, the plan meets the directions of City Council of a stadium, greenspace, revenue neutrality and management structure, with the significant difference that all site revenue surplus is returned to the taxpayer and the park is kept 100% public.

On June 21, 2010 the LPC submitted its competitive bid to the Ottawa City Council. Council voted to continue with the OSEG plan. On September 14, 2010, LPC presented a preview of the revised proposal to the planning and environment committee of Ottawa City Council. The group presented two options for Lansdowne, a $98 million proposal that builds solar roofing on the south-side stands, installs an Olympic-size pool and constructs a concert shell in new greenspace and a $47 million proposal to simply demolish the south-side stands and convert the space to greenspace. The proposals were developed with international design firm NBBJ.

Both proposals retain the hockey arena, Aberdeen, Coliseum and Horticulture buildings in place. The second alternative would see an RFP for a stadium-tied development on the vacant City lot at Bayview and Scott Street ( adjacent to the Ottawa River near LeBreton Flats). According to the LPC, the Bayview site is the logical long term strategic choice and was the number one stadium location by the City of Ottawa Stadium Location Study. Both of the Conservancy options are planned to be revenue positive for the city and have zero taxpayer cost. Despite the claims by Conservancy proponents, the Ottawa City Council planning and environment committee was not interested in the plans. The Conservancy's competitive bid was submitted to the City's Procurement Department directly on November 15, 2010 for consideration by Ottawa City Council. Both the outgoing and incoming councillors for the neighbouring Capital Ward have indicated that they want the City to consider the proposal. The LPC argues that the City must, according to procurement rules, study any competing proposal for a sole-source bid for City business.

The City rejected the Lansdowne Park Conservancy's submissions twice. In a November 18, 2010 letter to the LPC: "Your submission is not timely having regard to the fact Council already granted approvals pertaining to the Lansdowne Partnership Plan going back to June 28, 2010." The letter also pointed out that the city's legal counsel had already informed the LPC in August that any future proposals would not be accepted. The original Conservancy bid predated that decision on June 21, 2010, 7 days prior. However, under Procurement law the City was obliged to have a public Request for Proposals or RFP on the developer unsolicited proposal. and the Ottawa Option Policy The LPC's goal was to allow a competitive process.

The Conservancy filed a lawsuit seeking open bidding, but the Ontario Superior Court rejected the suit as an abuse of process on March 23, 2012. They filed an appeal which the Ontario Appeals court refused to hear on August 29, 2012. A request for the Supreme Court of Canada to hear an appeal was rejected in January 2013.

== Opposition ==
Although opposed to the OSEG plan, most opponents are not against redevelopment of the Lansdowne Park site per se. The site is considered to be in poor condition, for the amount of asphalt, and condition of the buildings, as well as other aspects. Opposition to the OSEG plan can be summarized with the following points:

- opposition to the sole-source nature of the plan
- opposition to the building of retail and commercial space controlled by a private developer on City-owned lands
- scale of the retail and residential components
- concerns about heritage aspects of the site
- cost of the project
- building on the Sylvia Holden Park lands

Most opposition comes from residents and businesses of the Glebe neighbourhood, but not exclusively. City Council members from surrounding wards also have voted against the OSEG plan. A survey of businesses in the Glebe area showed that they were concerned about the amount of retail development and the possible negative effects on their businesses.

=== Glebe Community Association ===
In October 2009, the local Glebe Community Association demanded that the City of Ottawa go back to the drawing board. An Association vote for a "fair, open and competitive approach" to developing Lansdowne Park was unanimously endorsed. A competitive process would require competing proposals to the Lansdowne Live project and invite bidding for the park redevelopmentk.

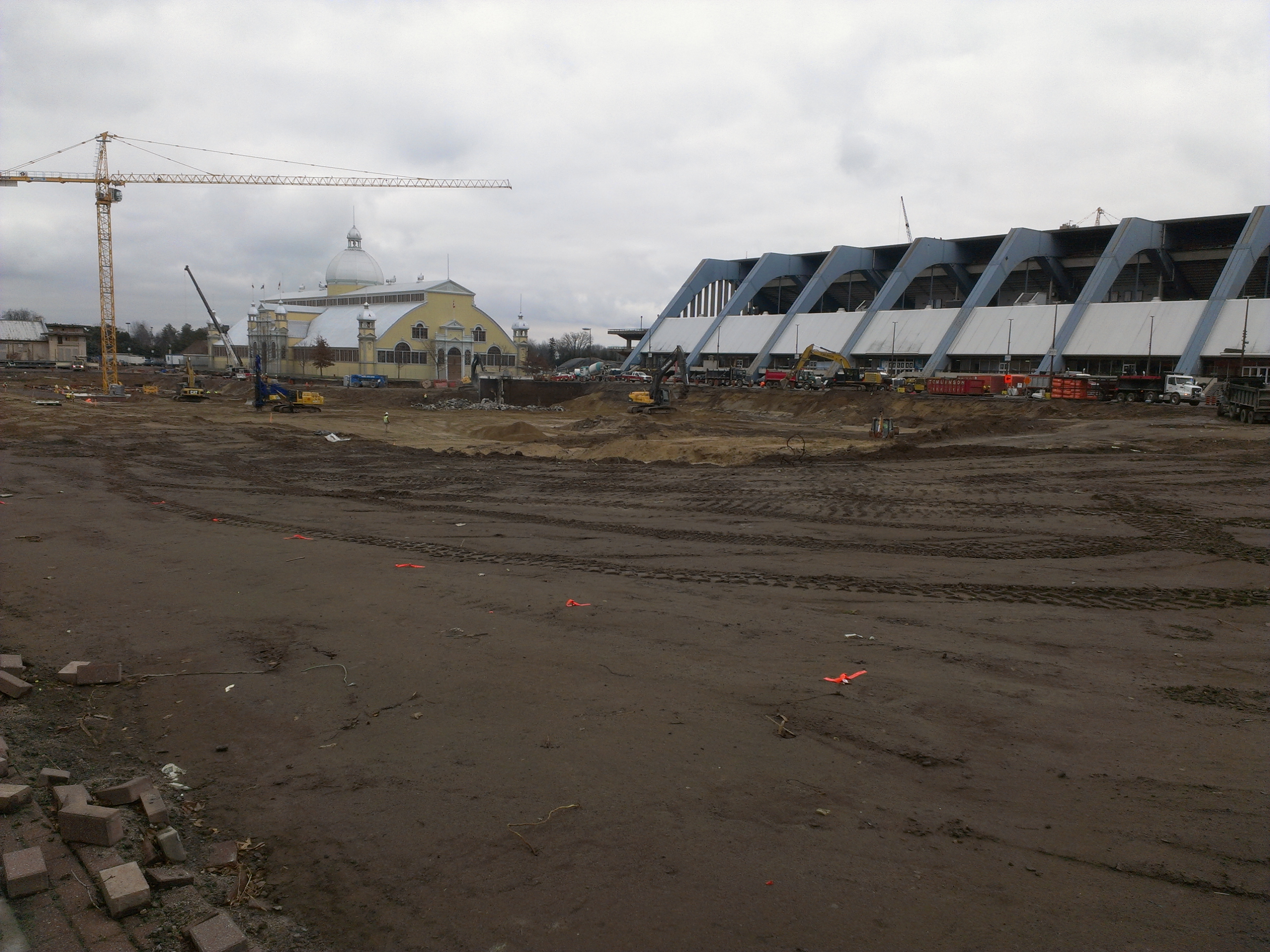
Lansdowne Park under renovation in early December 2012. From the intersection of Bank St. and Holmwood, the Aberdeen Pavilion is to the left, and the old north stands are to the right.

Glebe resident Ian Lee, who runs the MBA program at Carleton University's Sprott School of Business, was critical of the cost of the project. The plan approved by Ottawa says rebuilding Frank Clair Stadium, constructing underground parking, developing an urban park and relocating trade show space will cost $172.8 million, a number disputed by Lee, "Capital projects have a very bad habit of having major costs overruns." He predicts, the total cost will be "north of $300 million." The City had its auditor-general review the business plan who concluded that the plans' financial assumptions "are reasonable and present a realistic expectation for the future." However, Lee contends that the auditor-general should have remained neutral and uninvolved, and subsequently, he filed a complaint with the Canadian Institute of Chartered Accountants.

The Association agreed to the mediated settlement with the city in April 2011.

=== Heritage groups ===
Plans to move the Horticultural building were opposed by the Heritage Canada Foundation, which put Lansdowne Park on its top ten list of "endangered heritage" locations after a nomination by the Glebe Community Association. In the OSEG and urban park proposal, the Horticultural building, a building of architectural interest, would be moved a short distance east to make room for the OSEG quadrant. According to the City's solicitor, the City has the power to move the Horticulture Building without outside consent. A hearing was held to hear the debate on the moving of the building. The heritage board rejected the move of the building, although its decision is not binding on the City of Ottawa. However, due to the decision, the City has to rescind the heritage designation of the building in order to move it legally. It may then apply the heritage designation again in the future, after it has been moved.

Heritage advocates planned to fight on and planned to appeal to the Ontario government to stop the move of the Horticultural Building. On November 4, 2010, the City's Built Heritage Advisory Committee, a group of Ottawa citizens appointed by City Council to advise it on heritage matters, met and discussed the Heritage Impact Study of the Partnership Plan. The committee disliked the move of the Horticultural Building and recommended unanimously against the move.

=== Friends of Lansdowne Park ===
The Friends of Lansdowne Park was launched in July 2009 to advocate against the Lansdowne Live proposal. Although the Friends did not launch a counter-proposal, the Friends advocated for a revitalization of Lansdowne Park based on principles developed through a process involving "significant and meaningful public consultation, a fair, open design competition to revitalize Lansdowne Park – like the one Council interrupted" and "a sustainable design." The group has approximately 50 volunteers, and support across Ottawa, according to Doug Ward.

A court challenge was launched by Gary Sealey, Doug Ward, and the "Friends of Lansdowne" in September 2010, seeking to overturn the partnership plan on the grounds that city rules were not followed in the sole-source process. According to the City of Ottawa, the legality of the process was reviewed by third-party lawyers before the June 28 Council meeting. The group hired Steven Shrybman, a partner at Sack Goldblatt Mitchell LLP. Doug Ward described the hiring of Shrybman: "That's why there has been a large fundraising campaign ... because we wanted to get the best. And we have the best." In motions to the court, the group has requested copies of all City files related to the case and that in the event that the suit loses, the group will not have to pay the City and OSEG's legal costs. The challenge went to trial on June 21, 2011. The judge rendered a verdict rejecting the challenge on all counts on July 28, 2011. The group announced on August 17, 2011, that they would file an appeal to the court "that the Superior Court allowed Ottawa's City Council far too much latitude in regard to restrictions set out in provincial law concerning competitive procurement, the use of tax dollars to assist commercial entities and the requirement that it put the public interest first."

The Court ruled on April 30, 2012 to dismiss the Friends' appeal. The Court ruled the Superior Court interpreted the Municipal Act correctly, that no illegal bonus or procurement was conferred, the City of Ottawa did not contravene its own practices and the implementing by-law was passed in good faith. The Appeals Court noted that by-laws cannot be overturned on their "reasonableness or unreasonableness" but their legality under the Act.
