= Jeff Hunt =

Canadian businessman (born 1964)

- Born: April 17, 1964 (age 62); Stephenville, Newfoundland, Canada
- Known for: Past co-owner of the Ottawa 67's and Ottawa Redblacks franchises; Strategic partner and president of Atlético Ottawa

Jeff Hunt (born April 17, 1964) is a Canadian businessman who is a past co-owner (through the Ottawa Sports and Entertainment Group) of the Ottawa Redblacks football club of the Canadian Football League and the Ottawa 67's hockey club of the Ontario Hockey League. He started a carpet-cleaning firm called Canway. His firm was in the Profit Magazine 100 seven times in the 1990s.

== Background information ==
Hunt was born April 17, 1964, in Stephenville, Newfoundland. He is the eldest of three siblings, Alex and Sheryl Hunt. Throughout his childhood, Hunt moved around Newfoundland every couple of years due to his father being in the RCMP. He attended Memorial University of Newfoundland for one year before relocating to Ottawa, Ontario, at the age of 20 with his family. Here, Jeff commenced his carpet cleaning business.

Hunt began production of his carpet cleaning business, which he called Canway, in 1984. In the span of 13 years the business grew to over 250 locations in Canada and the US. In 1997 Hunt sold his business, and the following year he bought the Ottawa 67s.

== OHL hockey ==
In 1998, he purchased the Ottawa 67's and has seen his attendance quintuple. When Hunt purchased the 67's, the team's previous owner had been spending just $25,000 a year on marketing costs. Hunt would spend that amount every week once he became its new owner. His goal with the 67's was to provide an NHL-calibre experience, from the game and the music to the concessions and promotions. His goal was to create a fan experience that appeals to the whole family and connect the team with the community.

One of the highlights of his ownership was in 1999, when he led the team's bid to host the 1999 Memorial Cup tournament. Despite the fact that in 1997 the tournament had been hosted across the river in Hull, Quebec, he was able to convince the Canadian Hockey League to host the event in the city of Ottawa and guarantee his team a berth in the tournament. The 67's did not disappoint, as every game of the series was sold out at the 10,550 seat Ottawa Civic Centre. The 67's would go on to win the Memorial Cup.

Hunt's junior hockey career started off on a high note, and after a few rough seasons it was not long until his team made it to the finals again. In 2001, the 67s made it to the Memorial Cup held in Regina, Saskatchewan. They had tough luck in the round robin tournament, only winning one game, but Hunt traveled out to support his team despite their loss. The 67s succeeded once again in 2005 in making it to the Memorial Cup Finals in London, Ontario, while meeting with a devastating loss to Rimouski Oceanic, captained at the time by Sidney Crosby.

== CFL football ==
Hunt is a longtime fan of CFL football, he was a Rough Rider season ticket holder and has attended eight Grey Cups. In 2006, Jeff Hunt was part of the Golden Gate Capital group that was regarded as the front-runner among three bids to land a CFL expansion franchise for Ottawa. The group withdrew after a prominent group member was diagnosed with intestinal cancer. In September 2007, Hunt confirmed that he was a part of a group of local investors to talk to the CFL about bringing the Canadian Football League back to Ottawa. The partners aspired to take over Lansdowne Park, home of Frank Clair Stadium, and operate football, hockey and sports entertainment out of it. The objective was to renovate the stadium itself, and add luxury suites and state-of-the-art facilities.

On March 25, 2008, Hunt and his partners were awarded an expansion franchise. The team was expected to play at Frank Clair Stadium if the stadium could be remodeled, and had been conditionally awarded the right to host the 2014 Grey Cup game. A Can $7 million fee was reported to have been paid. After originally being announced to begin play in 2010, its start date was pushed back to 2012, then 2013. However, the team began play in 2014.

Despite commencing the project for the new CFL team commenced in 2008, the official court decision was not made until September 2012 that granted the Ottawa Sports and Entertainment Group the official green light to begin construction. The partners faced years of appeals to the Ontario Court, which prevented them from being able to begin their vision. A local group caused these hindrances from the Glebe area of Ottawa, called the Friends of Lansdowne, who strongly opposed the new plan. The group purchased the rights to the Ottawa Rough Riders name from the Rough Riders' last owner, Horn Chen. In order to install the Rough Riders name on his new team, the group would have to seek approval from the Saskatchewan Roughriders. When the request was denied, the group elected to call the new franchise the Redblacks.

== Lansdowne redevelopment plan ==
Hunt, along with partners Roger Greenberg, John Ruddy and Bill Shenkman set out in 2006 to bid for the expansion of the CFL franchise as well as the redevelopment of Ottawa's Lansdowne Park. The partners banded together to form the Ottawa Sports and Entertainment group. Their vision for the new Lansdowne Park includes a reconstructed state of the art football stadium, a soccer field to host their anticipated soccer team as well as a massive shopping center including various restaurants. The redevelopment plan also includes housing and condos for people to rent and buy directly on site. The Ottawa Sports and Entertainment Group met with various obstacles, namely the group under the name Friends of Lansdowne who tried numerous times to appeal to the court to have these plans halted. Despite various attempts from Friends of Lansdowne, the Ontario Court of Appeal dismissed their allegations of procurement violations and granted the partners permission for the $300 million contract to rebuild the stadium. Construction on this project was completed in early 2014.

== Successes ==
In Hunt's 14 seasons with the team, he has been to the Memorial Cup Finals three times, won the eastern conference championship (the Bobby Orr Trophy) three times, and has been the east division champions (Leyden trophy) seven times. He worked 11 seasons with head coach and hockey legend Brian Kilrea. Hunt spoke at Kilrea's retirement ceremony in 2009 and the two still remain good friends to this day.

Under Hunt's ownership, the team has seen several National Hockey League alumni including Brendan Bell, Logan Couture, Zenon Konopka, Brian Campbell, Tyler Toffoli, Cody Ceci, and Sean Monahan among others.
