= Biovail =

Canadian pharmaceutical company

Biovail Corporation
- Type: Public
- Traded as: TSX: BVF
- Industry: Biotechnology; Pharmaceutical
- Founded: 1991
- Founder: Eugene Melnyk; Rolf Reininghaus; Mahmood Khan
- Defunct: 2010
- Fate: Merged with Valeant Pharmaceuticals International
- Headquarters: Mississauga, Ontario, Canada
- Area served: North America
- Key people: Dr. Douglas J.P. Squires (Chairman of the Board); William M. Wells (CEO)
- Products: Medicine; Drugs
- Revenue: ▼$ 757.18 million (2008)
- Operating income: ▼$ 114.24 million (2008)
- Net income: ▲$ 199.90 million (2008)
- Total assets: ▼$ 1.623 billion (2008)
- Total equity: ▼$ 1.201 billion (2008)
- Number of employees: 1,368 - March 2009
- Divisions: Biovail Pharmaceuticals Canada (BPC); Biovail Contract Research (Canada); Biovail Corporation (Canada)
- Subsidiaries: Biovail Pharmaceuticals, Inc. (BPI) (U.S.); Biovail Technologies Ltd. (U.S.); Biovail Laboratories - Dorado (Puerto Rico); Biovail Laboratories - Carolina (Puerto Rico); Biovail Laboratories International SRL (Barbados); Biovail Technologies (Ireland) Limited
- Website: www.biovail.com

Biovail Corporation was a Canadian pharmaceutical company, operating internationally in all aspects of pharmaceutical products. Its major production facility was located in Steinbach, Manitoba. It merged with Valeant Pharmaceuticals International in 2010.

== History ==
As noted in the February 2009 Settlement Agreement with the Ontario Securities Commission: "Biovail admitted that [...] it violated Ontario securities law and engaged in conduct contrary to the public interest."

On September 28, 2010, Biovail merged with Valeant Pharmaceuticals (Bausch Health). The company retained the Valeant name and J. Michael Pearson as CEO, but was incorporated in Canada and temporarily kept Biovail's headquarters.

== Early growth and contributions in Canada ==
Biovail’s roots trace back to the 1980s, when Eugene Melnyk, through his company Trimel, pivoted from medical publishing toward pharmaceuticals. In the early 1990s, the firm restructured and adopted the Biovail name, with a strategic focus on drug delivery and controlled-release formulations of established molecules. By concentrating on formulation innovation rather than on de novo drug discovery, Biovail positioned itself to bring incremental improvements to therapies already proven safe and effective.

Following its restructuring, the company aggressively executed its controlled-release strategy through strategic corporate actions in the mid-1990s. On March 29, 1994, the company officially consolidated its corporate architecture by amalgamating Trimel Corporation with its subsidiary to form Biovail Corporation International. During this early foundational period, Biovail secured pivotal development agreements that anchored its commercial pipeline; notably, in June 1993, it entered into a joint product rights agreement with Hoechst-Roussel Pharmaceuticals to co-develop diltiazem-based cardiovascular therapies designed to compete directly with existing market blockbusters. Although this joint venture faced sudden disruption and subsequent litigation when Hoechst AG moved to acquire a competitor in late 1994, a subsequent April 1995 settlement successfully assigned the full New Drug Application (NDA) rights of the flagship drug Tiazac directly to Biovail. This structural milestone legally secured the proprietary foundation for Biovail's first major international commercial rollout and established its signature formulation model.

=== Products and strategy ===
One of the company’s early commercial successes was the launch of the cardiovascular drug Tiazac (and its once-daily version Tiazac XC) in Canada. Other marketed products included Celexa, Wellbutrin SR/XL, and Retavase, promoted domestically through its Canadian sales arm, Crystaal (later Biovail Pharmaceuticals Canada). These products introduced extended-release or simplified dosing schedules that improved adherence and outcomes for Canadian patients compared with earlier formulations.

Biovail also expanded through licensing agreements and acquisitions, applying its proprietary technologies such as CEFORM®, FlashDose®, and Consurf to improve drug delivery. By leveraging formulation innovation, the company sought to add value without incurring the high costs and risks associated with discovering new chemical entities.

=== Operations and employment ===
Biovail invested heavily in Canadian operations. Its large manufacturing facility in Steinbach, Manitoba became a major local employer and an important contributor to Canada’s pharmaceutical production base. The company also established its headquarters in Mississauga, Ontario, creating high-skill roles in management, finance, regulatory affairs, and strategy. Together, these sites anchored hundreds of jobs in Canada and provided a platform for training a generation of pharmaceutical professionals, many of whom went on to leadership positions across the Canadian life sciences sector.

At its peak, Biovail reported employing around 1,600 people worldwide, with approximately 1,368 employees on record in 2009. Public filings did not specify the Canadian-only share of this workforce, but the Steinbach and Mississauga operations represented a significant proportion.

=== Economic and ecosystem impact ===
As one of the few Canadian-origin pharmaceutical firms to reach global scale in the 1990s and 2000s, Biovail was viewed domestically as a flagship success story. At its peak, the company reported revenue growth from US$19 million in the mid-1990s to over US$1 billion by the mid-2000s. Its public listing on the Toronto Stock Exchange and New York Stock Exchange attracted institutional and retail investment, contributed to corporate and payroll tax revenues, and raised Canada’s profile as a home for internationally competitive pharmaceutical companies.

Biovail’s exports positioned Canada as a notable player in international pharmaceutical trade. In recognition of its contribution to export growth, Export Development Canada announced a US$50 million contribution in 2009 to support one of Biovail’s facilities. Beyond financial measures, Biovail’s operations created demand for contract research organizations, analytical labs, regulatory consultants, and packaging firms, fostering spillover growth in Canada’s wider life sciences ecosystem.

=== Legal issues ===
==== Aplenzin securities fraud class action ====
A class action suit was filed against Biovail by investors who between December 14, 2006, and July 19, 2007, bought Biovail stock, alleging that the company had failed to disclose that the multi-dose study on depression drug Aplenzin would not be sufficient for the FDA to approve it. The lawsuit was dismissed with prejudice in 2009, with Judge Colleen McMahon describing the complaint as "legally baseless."

==== SAC/Gradient Analytics lawsuit and SEC complaint ====
In March 2006, CBS program 60 Minutes featured Biovail in a story about its lawsuit against hedge fund SAC Capital Partners and Camelback (now known as Gradient Analytics), among others. According to Eugene Melnyk, "there's a group of people that got together and essentially attacked the company by putting out false reports, and we're just fighting back for our shareholders."

The alleged conspiracy began with Camelback, an Arizona stock-analysis firm that advertises that it publishes impartial financial reports on companies to help investors evaluate stocks. In the spring of 2003, the hedge fund SAC asked them for a report on Biovail. Darryl Smith, Mark Rosenblum, Demetrios Anifantis, and Robert Ballash, former Camelback employees, alleged that Camelback had allowed their client SAC to determine the content and timing of their reports on Biovail.

Camelback said those former employees were lying and disgruntled, that Anifantis and Ballash were fired because of unethical conduct; Smith for poor performance; Rosenblum was laid off. These four say they were let go after they complained to their superiors about Camelback's practices. SAC denied all the charges in Biovail's lawsuit and said that the decline in the Biovail's stock was due to earnings shortfalls and regulatory investigations.

In March 2008, the United States Securities and Exchange Commission (SEC) sued Biovail and some of its former officers, alleging that "present and former senior Biovail executives, obsessed with meeting quarterly and annual earnings guidance, repeatedly overstated earnings and hid losses in order to deceive investors and create the appearance of achieving earnings goals. When it ultimately became impossible to continue concealing the company's inability to meet its own earnings guidance, Biovail actively misled investors and analysts about the reasons for the company's poor performance." Biovail settled for US$10 million. Gradient Analytics, successor to Camelback, issued a press release stating that the SEC's suit "confirms the validity of Gradient's critical analysis of Biovail but raises serious questions about how companies retaliate against analysts with threats, intimidation, and lawsuits."

60 Minutes has been accused of botching the Biovail story by the Columbia Journalism Review's Audit columnist and The New York Times' Joe Nocera, who felt Lesley Stahl accepted Biovail's conspiracy theories about short sellers without proper consideration.

SAC and Gradient filed a suit against Biovail for malicious prosecution in February 2010. On September 28 Biovail merged into Valeant Pharmaceuticals Inc. On November 4 Valeant announced that they had settled with Gradient, saying "The initiation of litigation against Gradient, its founders Dr. Carr Bettis and Dr. Donn Vickrey, and others in 2006 by Biovail's management at the time was regrettable. We would like to put this incident behind us."

==== Penalties against Eugene Melnyk ====
In May 2011, the Ontario Securities Commission in Canada banned Eugene Melnyk from senior roles at public companies in Canada for five years and fined him $565,000. Earlier in the same year Melnyk had settled with the US SEC, agreeing to pay a civil penalty of US$150,000; he had previously paid US$1 million to settle other claims with the SEC.
