= Ottawa Sports and Entertainment Group =

Canadian management group

- Company type: Public–private partnership
- Industry: Professional sports, property management
- Founded: Ottawa, Ontario, Canada (2009)
- Headquarters: 1015 Bank Street; Ottawa, Ontario; K1S 3W7
- Area served: National Capital Region
- Key people: Roger Greenberg, Chairman & Managing partner Mark Goudie, President & CEO
- Products: Professional sports teams, sports venues
- Subsidiaries: Ottawa Redblacks; Ottawa Fury FC (2011–2019); Ottawa 67's; Ottawa Titans (co-owners)
- Website: www.ottawaredblacks.com/oseg/

Ottawa Sports and Entertainment Group (OSEG) is a professional sports and commercial real estate management group based in Ottawa, Ontario, Canada. The primary holdings of the company are a pair of professional sports franchises: the Ottawa Redblacks of the Canadian Football League and the Ottawa 67's of the Ontario Hockey League. OSEG owned Ottawa Fury FC of the North American Soccer League and USL Championship until said team was dissolved in November of 2019. In addition to its sports franchises, OSEG operates facilities at Lansdowne Park associated with these teams, which are owned by the city of Ottawa: TD Place Stadium, TD Place Arena, and other facilities. It was formed as a partnership between private partners and the city of Ottawa in 2009 initially to revive Ottawa's CFL franchise after the demise of franchise's previous incarnation, the Ottawa Renegades, and including a revitalization of the Lansdowne Park area.
