= Eugene Melnyk =

Canadian sports businessman (1959–2022)

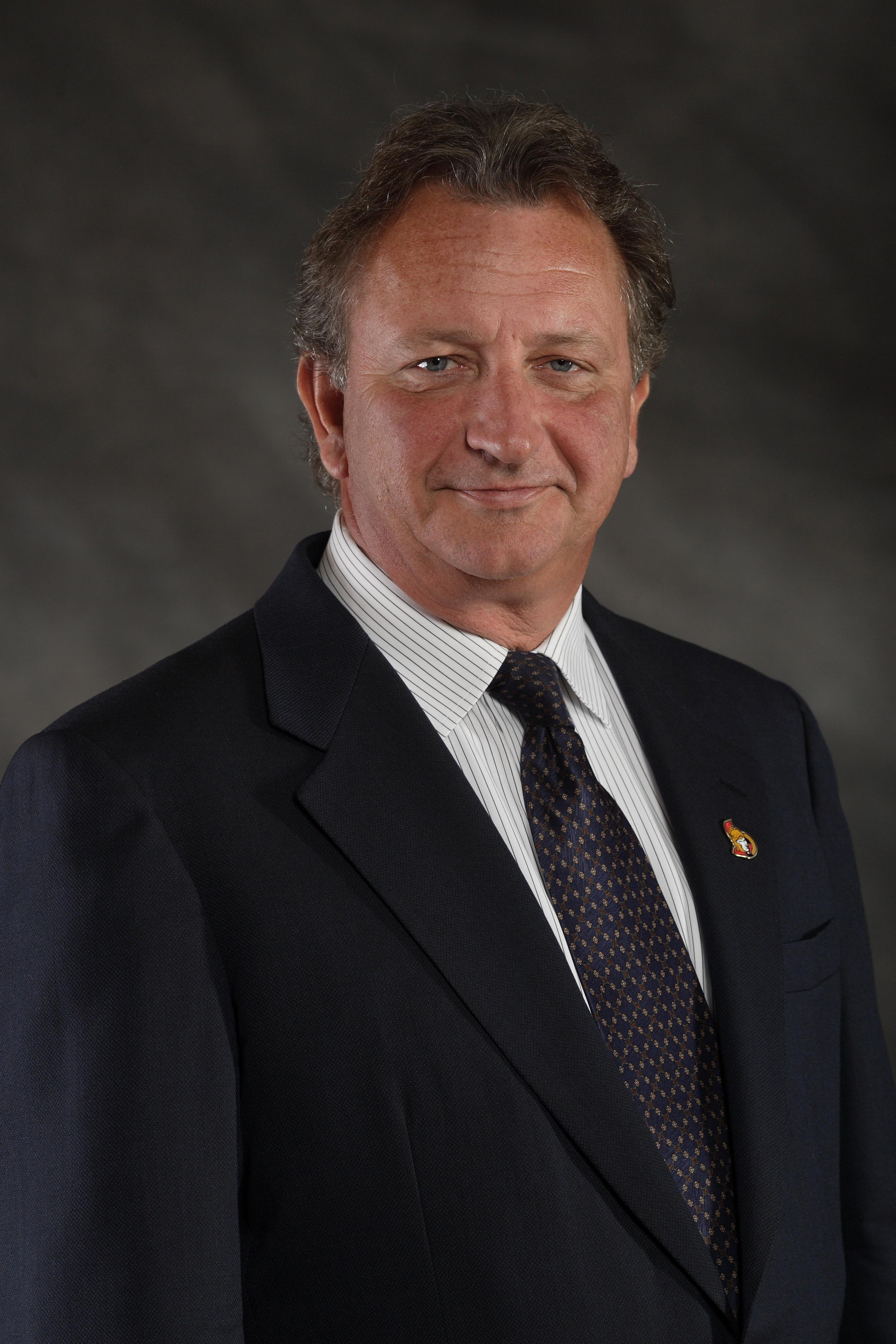
- Melnyk in 2017
- Born: Eugene Nestor Melnyk; May 27, 1959; Toronto, Ontario, Canada
- Died: March 28, 2022 (aged 62)
- Education: St. Michael's College School
- Occupations: Businessman, sports franchise owner
- Known for: Founder Biovail Corporation, Owner Ottawa Senators, Philanthropist
- Board member of: Ottawa Senators
- Children: 2
- Awards: Order of St. Michael (2008)

Eugene Nestor Melnyk (May 27, 1959 – March 28, 2022) was a Canadian businessman, philanthropist, and owner, governor, and chairman of the National Hockey League (NHL)'s Ottawa Senators and the American Hockey League (AHL)'s Belleville Senators. He was the founder, chairman, and CEO of Biovail Corporation, once Canada's largest publicly traded pharmaceutical company with more than CA$1 billion in annual revenue. He had sold almost all of his holdings in the company by 2010. Canadian Business magazine ranked Melnyk 79th on its 2017 list of Canada's 100 wealthiest people, with a net worth of CA$1.21 billion. He was also one of the richest residents of Barbados.

== Business career ==
=== Trimel Corporation ===
In 1982, Melnyk founded medical publishing company Trimel Corporation, which summarized important medical research into shorter and more accessible notes for doctors. Trimel was taken public in 1987 and sold to Thomson Publications (part of the Thomson Corporation) in 1989.

=== Biovail Corporation ===
In 1989, Melnyk founded Biovail Corporation, a specialty pharmaceutical company. During his time as chairman and CEO of Biovail, revenues grew from $19 million in 1995 to $1.067 billion in 2006. One of Biovail's strategies was to look for drugs with expired patents, then reinvent them with the company's proprietary technologies. One example was producing drugs that had controlled-release features that let patients take the drug once a day instead of several times.

After taking 100% control of Biovail in 1991, Melnyk oversaw the launch of its first major product, Tiazac, in 1996, and its best selling drug, Wellbutrin XL, was licensed for distribution in the United States in 2001. In 2004, a year after becoming owner of the Ottawa Senators, Melnyk left the CEO position but continued on as chairman. In 2005, the company secured a supply deal for Tramadol. He retired as Biovail Corporation's chairman in 2007. The company was acquired by Valeant Pharmaceuticals in 2010 and is now Bausch Health.

=== Clean Beauty Collective Inc. ===
In 2007, Melnyk purchased a controlling stake in the Canadian beauty line Fusion Brands Inc.. The deal was estimated to have been worth US$85 million according to several analysts. After several years under the Fusion Brands Inc. name, the company rebranded in 2018 under the name Clean Beauty Collective Inc. to mark its 15th anniversary.

=== Neurolign Technologies Inc. ===
In 2019, Melnyk founded Neurolign Technologies Inc., a medical device company specializing in the diagnosis and treatment of neurological disorders. He served as the company's Chairman and Chief Executive Officer.

=== RendezVous LeBreton ===
In 2015, the National Capital Commission (NCC) put out a request for submissions to redevelop the south and south-western sections of LeBreton Flats, a prime downtown Ottawa development site, 21 hectares (52 acres) in size. Melnyk formed a partnership with Trinity Developments to bid on the redevelopment, known as RendezVous LeBreton. In April 2016, the NCC selected the RendezVous LeBreton proposal, which included 4,000 housing units, park space, a recreation facility with services for the disabled, a library (just off the defined redevelopment lands) and a new arena for the Ottawa Senators.

In January 2018, the NCC reached an agreement with RendezVous to redevelop LeBreton Flats in a two-phase operation. However, in November 2018, the NCC announced that "partnership issues" remained to be resolved with RendezVous, and that it might cancel the development and start over in January 2019. It was later learned by the media that the Senators' organization was suing Trinity Developments, in part because of a Trinity development nearby on the south side of Albert Street. The two parties agreed to mediation over the project, but did not come to an agreement. The NCC has since produced a new plan that leaves room for a possible arena. Trinity Development filed a countersuit against Melnyk, which was settled out of court in December 2022, 9 months after Melnyk's death.

== Sports ownership ==
=== Mississauga IceDogs ===
Melnyk's first foray into sports franchise ownership came in 2001 with the purchase of the St. Michael's Majors of the Ontario Hockey League (OHL). At the time, the club played at the St. Michael's College School's Arena in Toronto, but Melnyk aimed to move the team to nearby Mississauga. As there was already an OHL team in Mississauga, the Mississauga IceDogs, Melnyk subsequently purchased the IceDogs franchise in 2006 and resold them in 2007 in order to facilitate the move of the Majors from Toronto to Mississauga. Per the deal arranged by Melnyk, the IceDogs' new ownership relocated the team to St. Catharines, Ontario and the team became known as the Niagara IceDogs. On May 10, 2012, Melnyk sold the St. Michael's Majors (now called the Mississauga Steelheads) to Elliott Kerr for an undisclosed price.

=== Ottawa Senators ===
On August 26, 2003, Melnyk purchased the Ottawa Senators NHL franchise along with their arena, then known as the Corel Centre. At that time the team was facing bankruptcy and an uncertain future in Ottawa, and was purchased for the sum of US$92 million, after he reached a deal with the franchise's creditors after Rod Bryden's attempt to purchase the franchise fell through.

In December 2020, the Ottawa Senators were listed by Forbes magazine as the NHL's twenty-sixth highest valued franchise at US$450 million. The team enjoyed some success on the ice under Melnyk's tenure, making the playoffs nine times, including a trip to the 2007 Stanley Cup Finals, losing in five games to the Anaheim Ducks, as well as the Eastern Conference Finals in the 2017 Stanley Cup playoffs, where they lost to the Pittsburgh Penguins in seven games.

==== Attendance ====
During the 2018–19 season the team set a franchise record for unfilled seats, with attendance dropping to a 22-year low. During that season, the team drew an average of 14,553 fans to its home games, the team's lowest attendance figures since it began playing in its current arena towards the end of the 1995–96 season. Attendance had been trending downward since 2012–13, when Senators' home games attracted an average of 19,408 fans.

==== Relationship with fanbase ====
In 2017 Melnyk told reporters that he would be open to the idea of moving the franchise to a different city if the fanbase didn't make efforts to increase attendance at Senators' home games. When pressed by reporters to clarify whether or not he would consider moving the team out of Ottawa, Melnyk replied, "If it becomes a disaster, yes. If you start not seeing crowds showing up, yes."

In early 2018, some fans in Ottawa had gradually become disillusioned with Melnyk's management style and perceived unwillingness to spend the money needed to build a championship-calibre team. This came after the Senators fell just one overtime goal shy of reaching the 2017 Stanley Cup Finals, and resulted in pressure from the Senators' fanbase for a change in team ownership in 2018, which culminated in a crowdfunding campaign to pay for billboards to go up across Ottawa. Despite the backlash, Melnyk often stated on the record that he had no intention of selling the franchise.

On September 11, 2018, the Senators released a video online in which Melnyk outlined the franchise's plans for a rebuild. The video received considerable criticism from fans and media for its awkward presentation and for the owner's own characterization of his team as being "in the dumpster." The relationship between Melnyk and Senators' fans further deteriorated at the 2019 trade deadline when the Senators traded away their leading scorers and remaining core players, Matt Duchene, Ryan Dzingel, and Mark Stone, all of whom were well liked in the community. Despite earlier promising to make every effort to re-sign the star players, Melnyk later contradicted himself when he was quoted as saying that trading away Mark Stone had been "[planned] for some time" as part of the rebuild.

==== Other ====
In November 2018, Melnyk was accused of being behind newly created and suspicious Twitter accounts began appearing, all of which praised Melnyk's performance while attacking his detractors. The Twitter accounts largely targeted certain writers who covered the Senators for local newspapers the Ottawa Citizen and Ottawa Sun, making similar claims that these writers had treated Melnyk unfairly. Speculation immediately arose that these were bot accounts and not real human beings. A subsequent investigation conducted by the Ottawa Citizen revealed that, although the bots could not be conclusively traced back to Melnyk, they were "created to launch a co-ordinated disinformation campaign and to attack media coverage of the Sens while lauding the team and its owner Eugene Melnyk".

=== Belleville Senators ===
In 2016, the Ottawa Senators in partnership with the City of Belleville, Ontario announced that Melnyk purchased the American Hockey League (AHL) franchise which was currently located in Binghamton, New York, and that the team would relocate to Belleville, Ontario for the 2017–18 season. The team agreed on an eight-year lease to welcome the Belleville Senators to the city. The Belleville Senators are the Ottawa Senators' AHL affiliate team.

=== Other ===
On September 16, 2008, Melnyk proposed plans for an Ottawa Major League Soccer professional soccer team, and a new soccer-specific Ottawa Soccer Stadium, but could not obtain support from Ottawa City Council. Melnyk's plan to build a new stadium near the Ottawa Senators arena in Kanata, a suburb of Ottawa, was in contention with a proposal by a consortium seeking to bring a Canadian Football League franchise to Lansdowne Park in downtown Ottawa. City council could only back one proposal and sided against Melnyk, favoring the return of the CFL to Ottawa.

In 2009, Melnyk served as chairman of the IIHF World U20 Championship.

Melnyk was also a successful thoroughbred racing horse breeder, having horses he bred go on to win all three legs of the Canadian Triple Crown. His most successful horse was Archers Bay, the son of Silver Deputy, who won the 1998 Queen's Plate – despite being the first horse Melnyk ever ran in the race – the 1998 Prince of Wales Stakes before being named Canada's champion three-year old male horse. In 2013, Melnyk stopped breeding horses and instead bought and raced yearlings. Melnyk was named Canada's best horse breeder twice, and in 2017, he was inducted into the Canadian Horse Racing Hall of Fame.

== Business ventures ==
- Ottawa Senators (NHL team)
- Canadian Tire Centre (Multi-purpose arena and home of the Ottawa Senators)
- Trimel Pharmaceuticals Corporation
- Biovail Corporation (retired), formerly known as Trimel Pharmaceuticals (same name as Melnyk's new pharmaceutical company)
- Bert's Bar (Barbados)
- Bert's Bar (Ottawa)
- Providence Charitable Trust
- Providence Elementary and Secondary schools
- Winding Oaks Farm (Florida, USA)
- Clean Beauty Collective Inc. (Cosmetics & Fragrances)
- Olivann (Fragrance)
- PurGenesis Technologies Inc.
- Barbados real estate
- Neurolign Technologies Inc.
- Belleville Senators

== Philanthropy ==
Eugene Melnyk was involved with various charitable organizations. His primary charitable focus was on helping children and the elderly. His involvement included:

- Honorary Director of Help Us Help the Children (HUHC), a humanitarian organization that benefited from his annual donation of medical supplies and clothing. The organization, founded in Canada, helps to offer vital care to over 100,000 children living in 220 orphanages scattered throughout Ukraine.
- Donated $1.8 million to St. Michael's College School to upgrade the field with new state-of-the-art artificial grass, stadium lights, sound system, and an electronic scoreboard. This field is called "The Eugene Melnyk Sports Field". Melnyk made several significant donations to the school making him the single largest individual donor in the history of the St. Michael's College School.
- Donated $1 million to the Belmont Child Care Association for the construction of a child care center at Belmont Park. Called Anna House, it was named after one of his two daughters and the center is the first facility in the United States to be located on the grounds of a racetrack. The center provides child care for all families who work at Belmont Park regardless of their ability to pay for services. Many of the children belong to grooms, exercise riders and other behind-the-scenes racetrack employees.
- Donated to finance the elaborately decorated Ukrainian, Byzantine Catholic chapel at the St. Demetrius Residence Centre for the elderly in Toronto.
- Donated $1 million to launch the foundation "Patrons of Sport" with Canadian Athletes Now Fund (CAN Fund). The foundation supports Canadian athletes.
- Honorary Patron of the St. Joseph's Health Centre; Donated $5 million to St. Joseph's Health Centre in Toronto to help improve patient access to one of Toronto's oldest hospitals. Eugene's father, Dr. Ferdinand Melnyk, was instrumental in creating the hospital's first emergency room department that now services the largest volume of patients of any single site hospital in the Greater Toronto Area. This donation was the single, largest private donation in the history of St. Joseph's Health Centre.
- In April 2007, Melnyk made a special surprise visit to Kandahar, Afghanistan to deliver a special donation of hockey equipment to Canadian and United States troops involved in the NATO rebuilding efforts in that country.
- The Ottawa Senators Foundation is the second largest charity in Ottawa/Gatineau region. His involvement with this Foundation led him to become a Founding Partner of a $4.5 million pediatric palliative care facility in Ottawa called Roger's House which he helped to officially open in April 2006 and was the second facility of its kind in North America.
- Hosted the "Eugene Melnyk Skate for Kids" event at Canadian Tire Centre every year where he donated Senators jerseys, helmets and brand new skates to hundreds of underprivileged children living in Ottawa.
- In 2014 Melnyk spearheaded a campaign to boycott sponsors of the 2018 FIFA World Cup in order to push FIFA to remove the event from Russia, out of protest for its war with Ukraine.

== Personal life ==
Melnyk was born in Toronto, Ontario, on May 27, 1959, the son of Ferdinand and Vera Melnyk, who were both born in Ukraine. Melnyk was born at St. Joseph's Health Centre in Toronto, where his father was a staff doctor. He was a Canadian citizen and also a resident of Barbados.

From 2014 to 2019, Melnyk was the honorary colonel of 414 Squadron of the Royal Canadian Air Force.

In July 2019, Melnyk was sued by Connecticut casino Mohegan Sun for more than US$1 million over a gambling dispute that occurred in 2017. The casino alleged that Melnyk failed to make good on a US$900,000 debt when multiple bank drafts totalling the amount were "dishonored" by TD Bank. Melnyk claimed the casino refused his requests to cash him out when he was winning, and his lawyer Jonathan Katz alleged that the casino "induced" Melnyk to continue playing by refusing to cash him out when his play had led to winning "significant amounts of money". The casino dropped the lawsuit in July 2021.

=== Health and death ===
Melnyk was hospitalized for end-stage liver failure and had a liver transplant at the Toronto General Hospital in May 2015, after a public appeal for a live liver donor found an anonymous donor.

Melnyk died on March 28, 2022, at the age of 62 after several months of illness. Melnyk's estate passed the ownership of the Ottawa Senators to his two daughters, Olivia and Anna Melnyk.

== See also ==
- List of billionaires
- List of Ukrainian Canadians

Sporting positions
Preceded by Rod Bryden	Ottawa Senators owner 2003–2022	Succeeded by Olivia and Anna Melnyk
