= Ottawa Soccer Stadium =

Proposed soccer facility

Aerial view of proposed stadium

The Ottawa Soccer Stadium was a proposed open-air soccer facility in Ottawa, Ontario, Canada. It was part of a proposal to bring a Major League Soccer franchise to Ottawa by the Ottawa Senators organization.

== Proposal ==
The stadium, projected to cost $100 million, was designed to hold 20,000 for sports. One end terrace on the north end was convertible to a concert stage for outdoor concerts, and with field seating, the stadium could hold 30,000 for concerts. The field would have had a natural grass surface built to MLS and FIFA specifications. Outside of the stadium, there would have been five open-air soccer fields, of which one would be to MLS and FIFA standards and the others to community standards. The purpose of the external fields was for community use and the MLS team's practices. The architectural design was by Rossetti Architects, architects of Scotiabank Place.

The stadium was to be located on City of Ottawa land to the south-east of nearby Scotiabank Place, in the west end of Ottawa, on Palladium Drive, west of Terry Fox Drive. The soccer stadium would share parking with Scotiabank Place. The land is currently frozen for development by the Ontario provincial government, as it is on a floodplain of the Carp River. The land is currently used as a snow dump.

The proponents were Senators Sports & Entertainment, owners of the NHL's Ottawa Senators. The stadium plans were announced on September 16, 2008 by Scotiabank Place CEO Cyril Leeder and SSE owner and chairman Eugene Melnyk. Senators Sports & Entertainment is seeking funding from all levels of government for construction and operation of the stadium, and will operate a new MLS franchise there separately under private ownership. To support the initiative, SSE launched the "Bring the World to Ottawa" campaign seeking broad community support.

== MLS expansion ==
While the MLS commissioner gave positive comments about the Ottawa proposal, MLS eventually granted expansion franchises to other cities, including Portland, Oregon and Vancouver, British Columbia.

== Lansdowne Live ==
At the same time that the Ottawa Soccer Stadium proposal was made, the City of Ottawa was presented with the "Lansdowne Live" proposal to revitalize Lansdowne Park and Frank Clair Stadium. A public debate went on both proposals, which would both require some investment on the part of the City. In February 2009, a public opinion poll conducted by The Ottawa Citizen, found that 79% of respondents preferred the Lansdowne Park Football facility option over the Kanata located soccer facility.

In April 2009, matters came to a head. The staff of the City of Ottawa presented a report to Council on the merits of the Soccer Stadium and Lansdowne proposals. The City held public hearings based on the report, which questioned the necessity of the spending, but gave a slight edge to the Lansdowne proposal. Councillors attempted to find out whether the SSE group would support sharing their stadium with a planned CFL franchise, but the SSE group rejected the possibility. Lansdowne Live proponents made it clear that an MLS team, or another pro soccer team, such as one in the North American Soccer League (NASL) could play at Frank Clair Stadium.

On April 22, 2009, the City of Ottawa Council chose the Lansdowne Live proposal over the SSE proposal as its choice for an outdoor stadium. Since that time, the Lansdowne Live proponents and the City of Ottawa have been negotiating over a final plan. Melnyk released a press release expressing his disappointment and directed SSE staff to stop work on their proposal.
