= 2027 Winnipeg Blue Bombers season =

CFL team season

- General manager: Kyle Walters
- President: Wade Miller
- Head coach: Vacant
- Home stadium: Princess Auto Stadium

Results
- Record: 0–0
- Division place: TBD, West
- Playoffs: TBD

Uniform
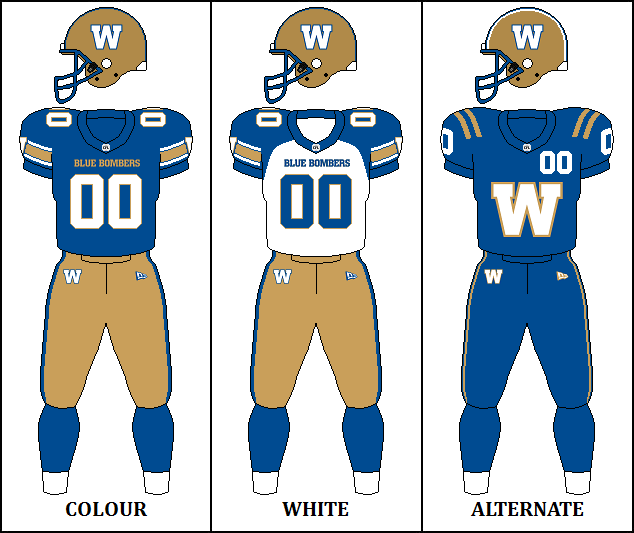

The 2027 Winnipeg Blue Bombers season is scheduled to be the 69th season for the team in the Canadian Football League (CFL) and their 94th season overall. The Blue Bombers will attempt to qualify for the playoffs for the 11th consecutive season and win their 13th Grey Cup championship.

The 2027 CFL season will be the first season since 2013 without long time head coach Mike O'Shea following his dismissal on November 19, 2026. This is scheduled to be the 13th full season under general manager Kyle Walters.

== Offseason ==
=== CFL Canadian draft ===
The 2027 CFL draft is scheduled to take place on April 13, 2027. The Blue Bombers are scheduled to have seven selections in the eight-round draft after notably trading their first-round selection to the Ottawa Redblacks in the trade for Dru Brown. Not including traded picks or forfeitures, the team will select fifth in each round of the draft after finishing fifth in the 2026 league standings.

Round	Pick	Player	Position	University Team	Hometown
2	14				
3	25				
4	34				
5	43				
6	52				
7	61				
8	70				

=== CFL global draft ===
The 2027 CFL global draft is scheduled to take place on April 14, 2027. Not including traded picks or forfeitures, the Blue Bombers will select fifth in each round of the draft after finishing fifth in the 2026 league standings.

Round	Pick	Player	Position	Club/School	Nationality
1	5				
2	14				
