= 2027 Ottawa Redblacks season =

CFL team season

- General manager: Ryan Dinwiddie
- President: Mike Morreale
- Head coach: Ryan Dinwiddie
- Home stadium: TD Place Stadium

Results
- Record: 0–0
- Division place: TBD, East
- Playoffs: TBD

Uniform
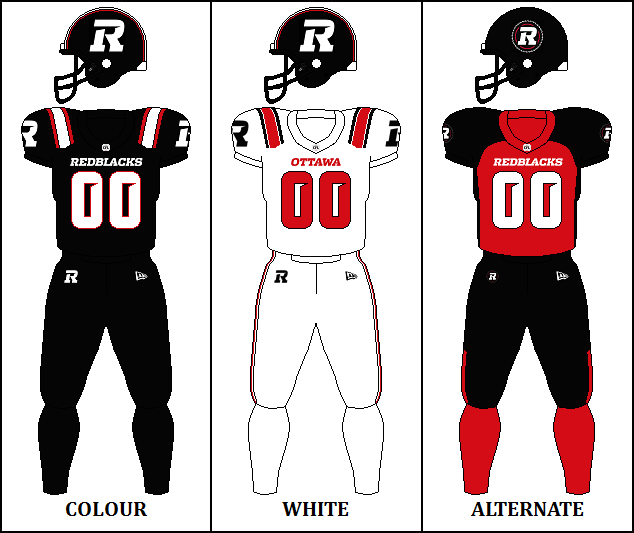

The 2027 Ottawa Redblacks season is scheduled to be the 13th season for the team since re-entering the Canadian Football League in 2014 and their 100th season since the inception of the IRFU. The Redblacks will attempt to improve upon their 1–17 record from 2026 and qualify for the playoffs for the first time since 2024. The team will attempt to win the 11th Grey Cup in Ottawa Football Club history.

The 2027 CFL season is scheduled to be the second for Ryan Dinwiddie as the team's head coach and general manager.

== Offseason ==
=== CFL Canadian Draft ===
The 2027 CFL draft is scheduled to take place on April 13, 2027. The Redblacks are scheduled to have eight selections in the eight-round draft while notably acquiring another first-round selection from the Winnipeg Blue Bombers in the trade for Dru Brown. Not including traded picks or forfeitures, the team will select first in each round of the draft after finishing last in the 2026 league standings.

Round	Pick	Player	Position	School	Hometown
1	1				
1	5				
3	21				
4	30				
5	39				
5	44				
6	48				
7	57				

=== CFL global draft ===
The 2027 CFL global draft is scheduled to take place on April 14, 2027. Not including traded picks or forfeitures, the Redblacks will select first in each round of the draft after finishing last in the 2026 league standings.

Round	Pick	Player	Position	Club/School	Nationality
1	1				
2	10				
