= 2027 Toronto Argonauts season =

CFL team season

- General manager: Michael Clemons
- Head coach: Mike Miller
- Home stadium: BMO Field

Results
- Record: 0–0
- Division place: TBD, East
- Playoffs: TBD

Uniform
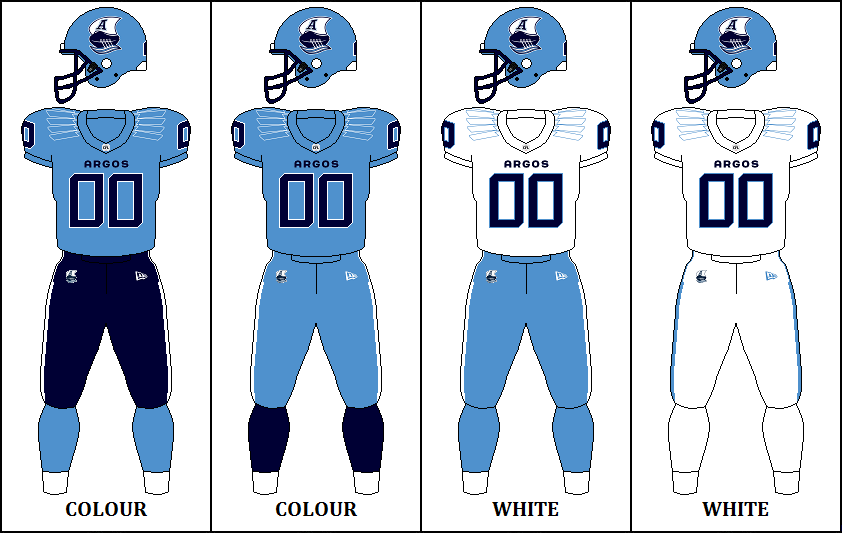

The 2027 Toronto Argonauts season is scheduled to be the 69th season for the team in the Canadian Football League and their 154th year of existence. The Argonauts will attempt to improve upon their 9–9 record from 2026, qualify for the playoffs for a second consecutive season, and win the 20th Grey Cup championship in franchise history.

The 2027 CFL season is scheduled to be the second season for Mike Miller as head coach and the eighth season for Michael Clemons as general manager.

== Offseason ==
=== CFL Canadian draft ===
The 2027 CFL draft is scheduled to take place on April 13, 2027. The Argonauts are scheduled to have seven selections in the eight-round draft. Not including traded picks or forfeitures, the team will select fourth in each round of the draft after finishing sixth in the 2026 league standings.

Round	Pick	Player	Position	School	Hometown
1	4				
2	10				
2	13				
3	24				
4	33				
5	42				
8	69				

=== CFL global draft ===
The 2027 CFL global draft is scheduled to take place on April 14, 2027. Not including traded picks or forfeitures, the Argonauts will select fourth in each round of the draft after finishing sixth in the 2026 league standings.

Round	Pick	Player	Position	Club/School	Nationality
1	4				
2	13				
