= 2027 Edmonton Elks season =

CFL team season

- General manager: Ed Hervey
- President: Chris Morris
- Head coach: Mark Kilam
- Home stadium: Commonwealth Stadium

Results
- Record: 0–0
- Division place: TBD, West
- Playoffs: TBD

Uniform
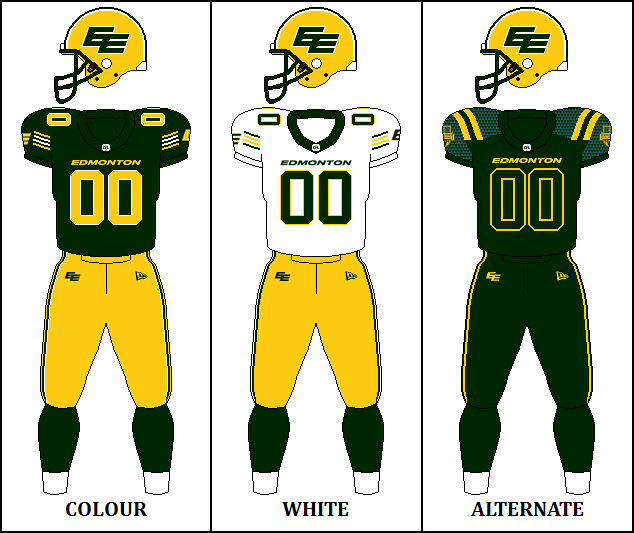

The 2027 Edmonton Elks season is scheduled to be the 69th season for the team in the Canadian Football League and their 78th overall. The Elks will enter the season as defending Grey Cup champions following their victory in the 113th Grey Cup game. The Elks will attempt to qualify for the playoffs for the second consecutive season and win their 16th Grey Cup championship.

The team's 2027 season is scheduled to be the third season for head coach Mark Kilam and seventh non-consecutive season for general manager Ed Hervey.

== Offseason ==
=== CFL Canadian draft ===
The 2027 CFL draft is scheduled to take place on April 13, 2027. The Elks are scheduled to have eight selections in the eight-round draft. Not including traded picks or forfeitures, the team will select ninth in each round of the draft after winning the 113th Grey Cup.

Round	Pick	Player	Position	University Team	Hometown
1	9				
2	18				
3	29				
4	38				
5	47				
6	56				
7	65				
8	74				

=== CFL global draft ===
The 2027 CFL global draft is scheduled to take place on April 14, 2027. Not including traded picks or forfeitures, the Elks will select ninth in each round of the draft after winning the 113th Grey Cup.

Round	Pick	Player	Position	Club/School	Nationality
1	9				
2	18				
