= 2027 Hamilton Tiger-Cats season =

CFL team season

- General manager: Orlondo Steinauer (de facto)
- President: Scott Mitchell
- Head coach: Scott Milanovich
- Home stadium: Hamilton Stadium

Results
- Record: 0–0
- Division place: TBD, East
- Playoffs: TBD

Uniform
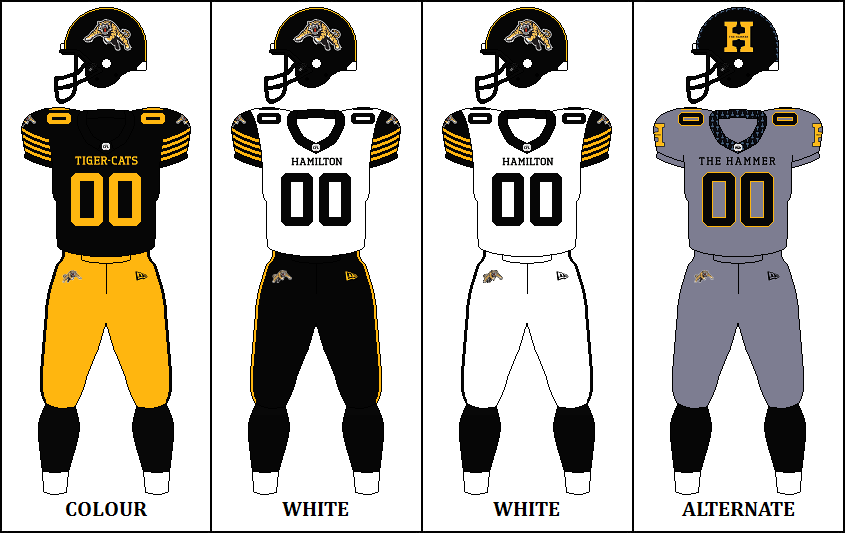

The 2027 Hamilton Tiger-Cats season is scheduled to be the 69th season for the team in the Canadian Football League and their 77th overall. The Tiger-Cats will attempt to qualify for the playoffs after a one-year absence and win their ninth Grey Cup championship.

The 2027 CFL season is scheduled to be the fourth season under head coach Scott Milanovich.

== Offseason ==
=== CFL Canadian Draft ===
The 2027 CFL draft is scheduled to take place on April 13, 2027. The Tiger-Cats are scheduled to have 11 selections in the eight-round draft. Not including traded picks or forfeitures, the team will select second in each round of the draft after finishing eighth in the 2026 league standings.

Round	Pick	Player	Position	University Team	Hometown
1	2				
2	11				
3	22				
4	31				
5	40				
5	TBD				
6	49				
6	TBD				
7	TBD				
8	66				
8	67				

=== CFL global draft ===
The 2027 CFL global draft is scheduled to take place on April 14, 2027. Not including traded picks or forfeitures, the Tiger-Cats will select second in each round of the draft after finishing eighth in the 2026 league standings.

Round	Pick	Player	Position	Club/School	Nationality
1	2				
2	11				
