= 2027 Saskatchewan Roughriders season =

CFL team season

- General manager: Jeremy O'Day
- President: Craig Reynolds
- Head coach: Corey Mace
- Home stadium: Mosaic Stadium

Results
- Record: 0–0
- Division place: TBD, West
- Playoffs: TBD

Uniform
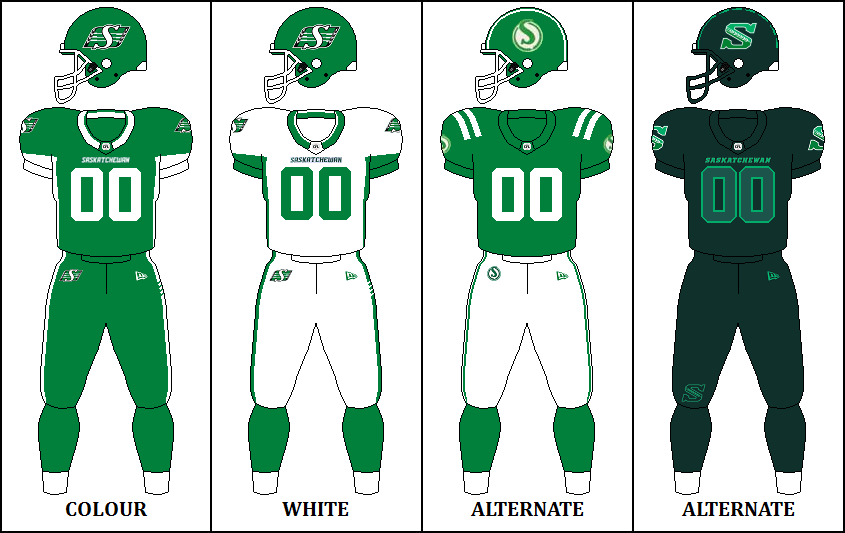

The 2027 Saskatchewan Roughriders season is scheduled to be the 69th season for the team in the Canadian Football League. It is the club's 118th year overall, and its 111th season of play. The Roughriders will attempt to qualify for the playoffs for the fourth consecutive season and win their sixth Grey Cup championship.

The 2027 CFL season will be the fourth season under head coach Corey Mace and seventh season under general manager Jeremy O'Day.

== Offseason ==
=== CFL Canadian Draft ===
The 2027 CFL draft is scheduled to take place on April 13, 2027. The Roughriders are scheduled to have seven selections in the eight-round draft after trading their fifth-round pick to the Ottawa Redblacks in exchange for Brett Lauther. Not including traded picks or forfeitures, the team will select sixth in each round of the draft after finishing fourth in the 2026 league standings.

| Round | Pick | Player | Position | University Team | Hometown |
|---|---|---|---|---|---|
| 1 | 6 | | | | |
| 2 | 15 | | | | |
| 3 | 26 | | | | |
| 4 | 35 | | | | |
| 6 | 53 | | | | |
| 7 | 62 | | | | |
| 8 | 71 | | | | |

=== CFL global draft ===
The 2027 CFL global draft is scheduled to take place on April 14, 2027. Not including traded picks or forfeitures, the Roughriders will select sixth in each round of the draft after finishing fourth in the 2026 league standings.

| Round | Pick | Player | Position | Club/School | Nationality |
|---|---|---|---|---|---|
| 1 | 6 | | | | |
| 2 | 15 | | | | |
