= 2027 BC Lions season =

CFL team season

- General manager: Ryan Rigmaiden
- President: Duane Vienneau
- Head coach: Buck Pierce
- Home stadium: BC Place Stadium

Results
- Record: 0–0
- Division place: TBD, West
- Playoffs: TBD

Uniform

The 2027 BC Lions season is scheduled to be the 69th season for the team in the Canadian Football League (CFL) and their 73rd overall. The Lions will attempt to improve upon their 10–8 record from 2026, qualify for the playoffs for the sixth straight year, and win the seventh Grey Cup championship in franchise history.

The 2027 CFL season is scheduled to be the third season for Buck Pierce as the team's head coach and the thirdseason for Ryan Rigmaiden as the team's general manager.

== Offseason ==
=== CFL Canadian Draft ===
The 2027 CFL draft is scheduled to take place on April 13, 2027. The Lions are scheduled to have eight selections in the eight-round draft. Not including traded picks or forfeitures, the team will select seventh in each round of the draft after finishing third in the 2026 league standings.

Round	Pick	Player	Position	School	Hometown
1	7				
2	16				
3	27				
4	36				
5	45				
6	54				
7	63				
8	72				

=== CFL global draft ===
The 2027 CFL global draft is scheduled to take place on April 14, 2027. Not including traded picks or forfeitures, the Lions will select seventh in each round of the draft after finishing third in the 2026 league standings.

Round	Pick	Player	Position	Club/School	Nationality
1	7				
2	16				
