= 2027 Calgary Stampeders season =

CFL team season

- General manager: Dave Dickenson
- President: Jay McNeil
- Head coach: Dave Dickenson
- Home stadium: McMahon Stadium

Results
- Record: 0–0
- Division place: TBD, West
- Playoffs: TBD

Uniform
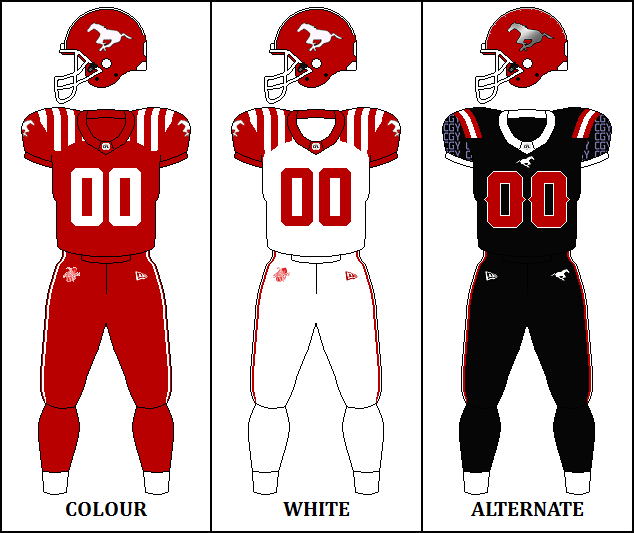

The 2027 Calgary Stampeders season is scheduled to be the 69th season for the team in the Canadian Football League and their 82nd overall. The Stampeders will attempt to qualify for the playoffs after a one-year absence, host a home playoff game for the first time since 2019, and win the ninth Grey Cup championship in franchise history. The 2027 CFL season is scheduled to be Dave Dickenson's 11th season as head coach and his fifth season as general manager.

== Offseason ==
=== CFL Canadian draft ===
The 2027 CFL draft is scheduled to take place on April 13, 2027. The Stampeders are scheduled to have eight selections in the eight-round draft. Not including traded picks or forfeitures, the team will select third in each round of the draft after finishing seventh in the 2026 league standings.

Round	Pick	Player	Position	University Team	Hometown
1	3				
2	12				
3	23				
4	32				
5	41				
6	50				
7	59				
8	68				

=== CFL global draft ===
The 2027 CFL global draft is scheduled to take place on April 14, 2027. Not including traded picks or forfeitures, the Stampeders will select third in each round of the draft after finishing seventh in the 2026 league standings.

Round	Pick	Player	Position	Club/School	Nationality
1	3				
2	12				
