= 2027 Montreal Alouettes season =

CFL team season

- General manager: Danny Maciocia
- Head coach: Jason Maas
- Home stadium: Percival Molson Memorial Stadium

Results
- Record: 0–0
- Division place: TBD, East
- Playoffs: TBD

Uniform
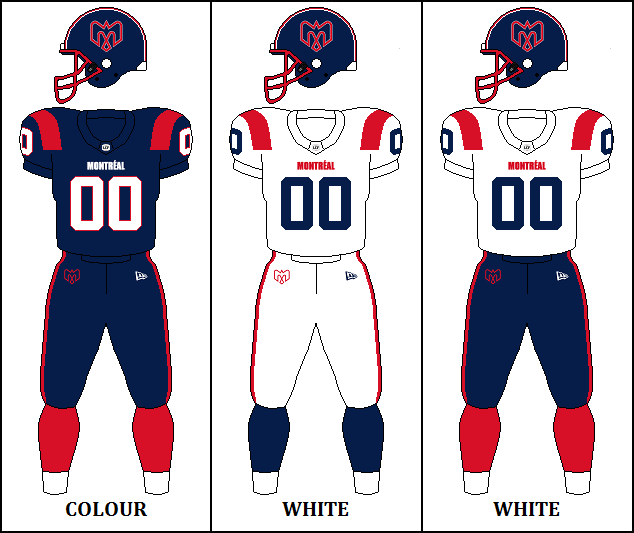

The 2027 Montreal Alouettes season is scheduled to be the 60th season for the team in the Canadian Football League and their 72nd overall. The Alouettes will attempt to qualify for the playoffs for the eighth consecutive season and win their ninth Grey Cup championship.

The 2027 CFL season is scheduled to be the fifth season with Jason Maas as the team's head coach and the seventh season with Danny Maciocia as the team's general manager.

== Offseason ==
=== CFL Canadian draft ===
The 2027 CFL draft is scheduled to take place on April 13, 2027. The Alouettes are scheduled to have eight selections in the eight-round draft. Not including traded picks or forfeitures, the team will select eighth in each round of the draft after losing the 113th Grey Cup.

Round	Pick	Player	Position	School	Hometown
1	8				
2	17				
3	28				
4	37				
6	55				
7	58				
7	64				
8	73				

=== CFL global draft ===
The 2027 CFL global draft is scheduled to take place on April 14, 2027. Not including traded picks or forfeitures, the Alouettes will select eighth in each round of the draft after losing the 113th Grey Cup.

Round	Pick	Player	Position	Club/School	Nationality
1	8				
2	17				
