= 2028 CFL draft =

Canadian Football League selection of national players scheduled for spring 2028

General information
- Sport: Canadian football
- Location: Toronto, Ontario

Overview
- 74 total selections in 8 rounds
- League: CFL
- Most selections (9): Ottawa Redblacks
- Fewest selections (7): Winnipeg Blue Bombers

The 2028 CFL Canadian draft is a selection of national players by Canadian Football League teams that is scheduled to take place in the spring of 2028. Seventy-four players are scheduled to be chosen from among eligible players from Canadian Universities across the country, as well as Canadian players playing in the NCAA. That number is subject to change if there are any forfeited selections.

== Format ==
As per the 2022 collective bargaining agreement, the two teams that had National players featured in the highest percentage of snaps played in the 2027 CFL season will each be awarded an additional second-round pick.

== Trades ==
In the explanations below, (D) denotes trades that took place during the draft, while (PD) indicates trades completed pre-draft.

=== Round two ===
- Winnipeg → Ottawa (D). Winnipeg traded a second-round pick in this year's draft and a first-round pick in the 2027 CFL draft to Ottawa in exchange for Dru Brown and Winnipeg's original second-round pick in the 2027 CFL draft. It was reported that this second-round pick could be upgraded to a first-round pick if unspecified conditions are met.
