= 114th Grey Cup =

2027 Canadian Football championship game

- Date: November 7, 2027
- Stadium: Mosaic Stadium
- Location: Regina

Broadcasters
- Network: Canada (English): TSN; Canada (French): RDS; Worldwide: DAZN

The 114th Grey Cup will be played to decide the Canadian Football League (CFL) championship for the 2027 season. The game is scheduled to be played on November 7, 2027, at Mosaic Stadium in Regina, Saskatchewan. It will be the fifth time that Regina has hosted the Grey Cup, with the most recent being in 2022. The game will be televised in Canada nationally on TSN and RDS.

== Date ==
As per the latest Collective Bargaining Agreement, the league had the option of moving the start of the season up to 30 days. The league revealed in the host announcement that this game would be played on the first Sunday of November, instead of the third Sunday of the month which had been used for the previous five seasons. This will be the earliest that a Grey Cup championship game has been played in a calendar year, besting the previous record of the 113th Grey Cup (November 15) by eight days.

== Rule changes ==
Effective for the 2027 season, this is scheduled to be the first Grey Cup to be played on a 100-yard field with 15-yard end zones and goal posts on the dead line. It will also be the first Grey Cup played as part of the league's revised eight-team playoff format.
