= End zone =

Scoring area on the field in gridiron football

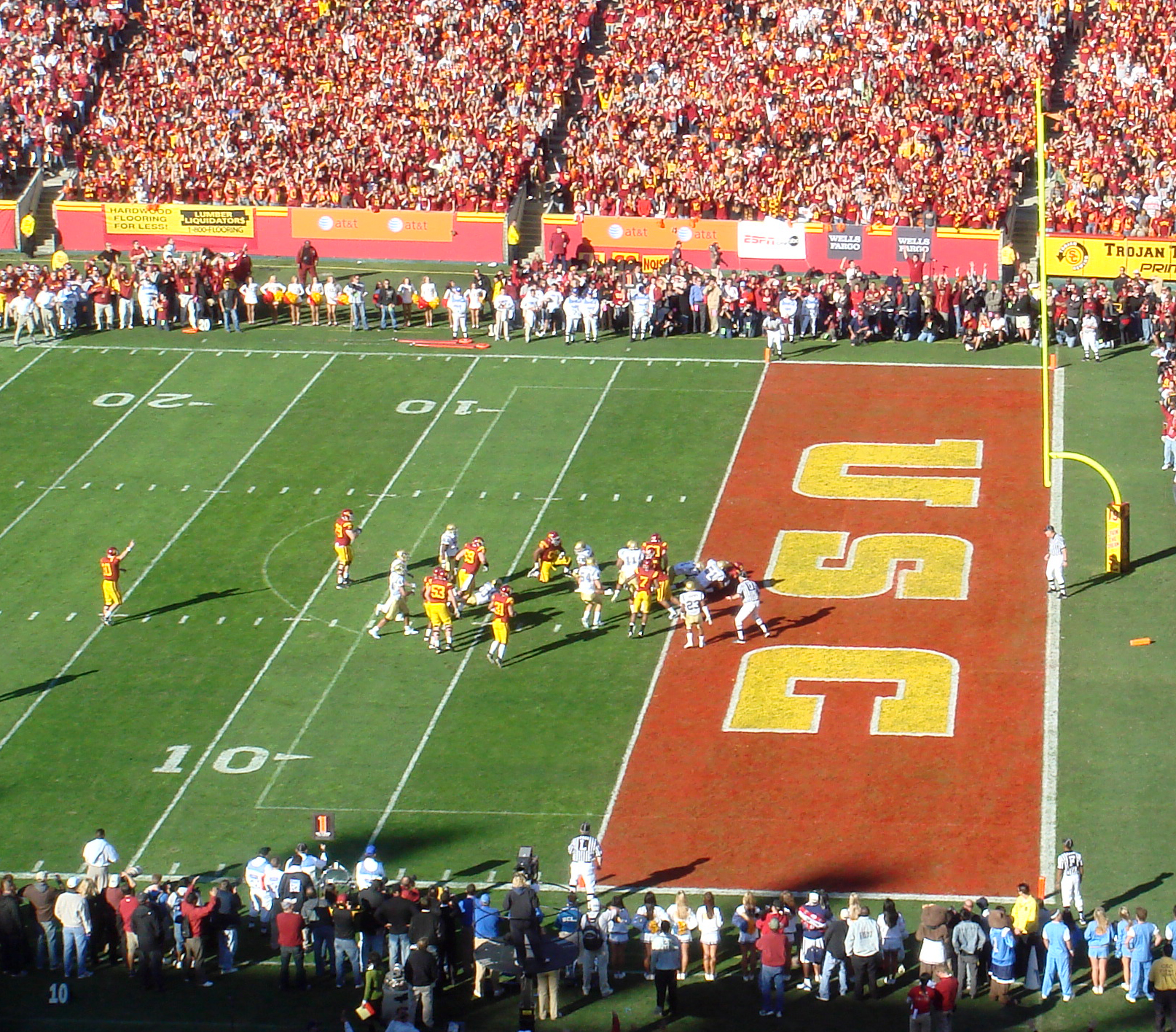
Running back Joe McKnight rushes into the red-painted end zone, scoring a touchdown during a USC college football game.

The end zone is the scoring area on the field, according to gridiron-based codes of football. It is the area between the end line and goal line bounded by the sidelines. There are two end zones, each being on the opposite side of the field. It is bordered on all sides by a white line indicating its beginning and end points, with orange, square pylons placed at each of the four corners as a visual aid (however, prior to around the early 1970s, flags were used instead to denote the end zone). Canadian rule books use the terms goal area and dead line instead of end zone and end line respectively, but the latter terms are the more common in colloquial Canadian English. Unlike sports like association football and ice hockey which require the ball/puck to pass completely over the goal line to count as a score, both Canadian and American football merely need any part of the ball to break the vertical plane of the outer edge of the goal line.

A similar concept exists in both rugby football codes, where it is known as the in-goal area. The difference between rugby and gridiron-based codes is that in rugby, the ball must be touched to the ground in the in-goal area to count as a try (the rugby equivalent of a touchdown), whereas in the gridiron-based games, simply possessing the ball in or over the end zone is sufficient to count as a touchdown.

Ultimate frisbee also uses an end zone scoring area. Scores in this sport are counted when a pass is received in the end zone.

== History ==
The end zones were invented as a result of the legalization of the forward pass in gridiron football. Prior to this, the goal line and end line were the same, and players scored a touchdown by leaving the field of play through that line. Goal posts were placed on the goal line, and any kicks that did not result in field goals but left the field through the end lines were simply recorded as touchbacks (or, in the Canadian game, singles; it was during the pre-end zone era that Hugh Gall set the record for most singles in a game, with eight).

In the earliest days of the forward pass, the pass had to be caught in-bounds and could not be thrown across the goal line (as the receiver would be out of bounds). This also made it difficult to pass the ball when very close to one's own goal line, since merely dropping back to pass or kick would result in a safety (rules of the forward pass at the time required the passer to be five yards behind the line of scrimmage, which would make throwing the forward pass when the ball was snapped from behind one's own five-yard line illegal in itself).

Thus, in 1912, the end zone was introduced in American football. In an era when professional football was still in its early years and college football dominated the game, the resulting enlargement of the field was constrained by fact that many college teams were already playing in well-developed stadiums, complete with stands and other structures at the ends of the fields, thereby making any substantial enlargement of the field unfeasible at many schools. Eventually, a compromise was reached: 12 yards of end zone were added to each end of the field, but in return, the playing field was shortened from 110 yards to 100, resulting in the physical size of the field being only slightly longer than before. Goal posts were originally kept on the goal lines, but after they began to interfere with play, they moved back to the end lines in 1927, where they have remained in college football ever since. The National Football League moved the goal posts up to the goal line again in 1933, then back again to the end line in 1974.

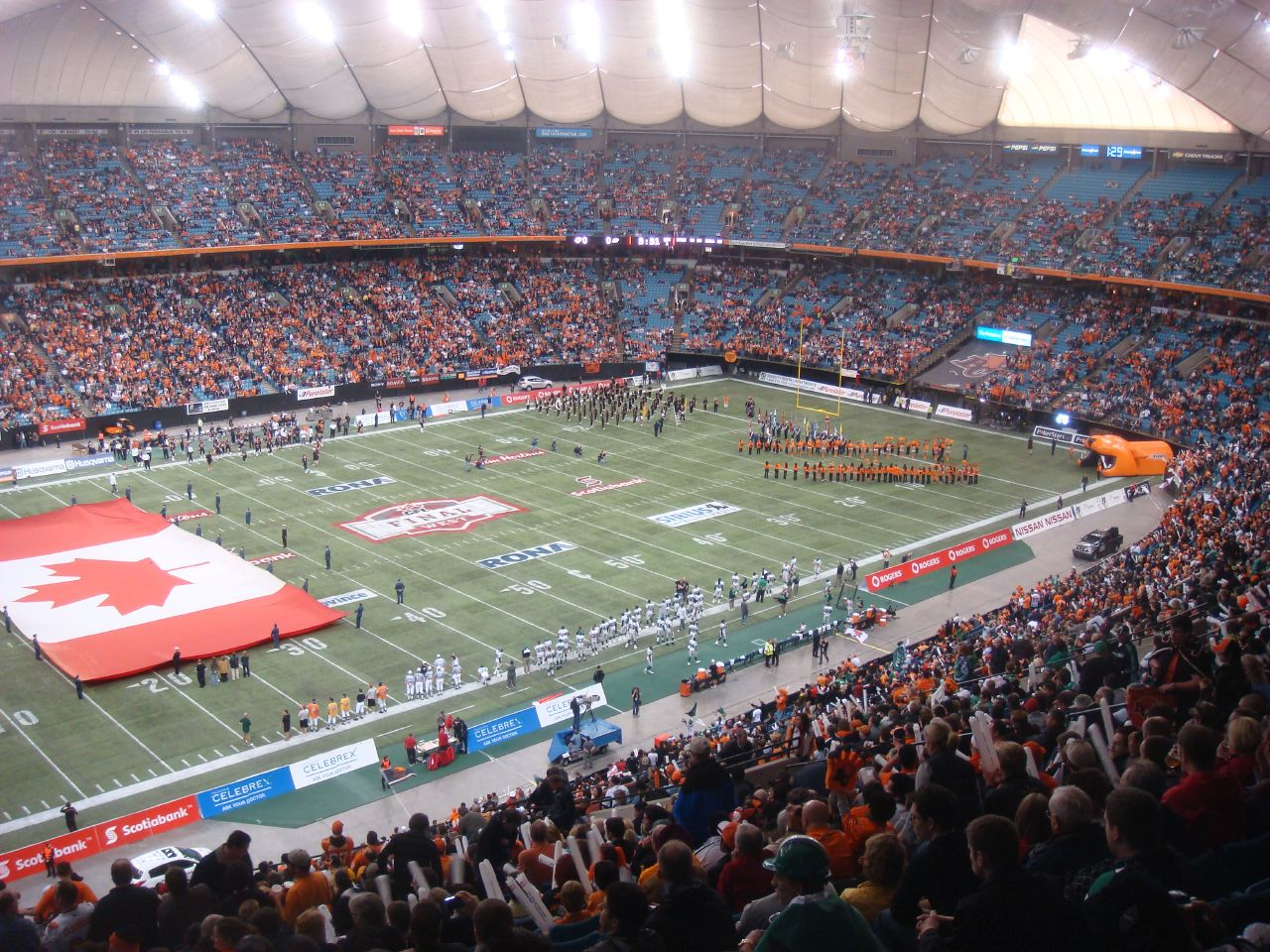
A Canadian football field, with 20-yard-deep end zone and goal post on the goal line

As with many other aspects of gridiron football, Canadian football adopted the forward pass and end zones much later than American football. The forward pass and end zones were adopted in 1929. In Canada, college football has never reached a level of prominence comparable to U.S. college football, and professional football was still in its infancy in the 1920s. As a result, Canadian football was still being played in rudimentary facilities in the late 1920s. A further consideration was that the Canadian Rugby Union (the governing body of Canadian football at the time, now known as Football Canada) wanted to reduce the prominence of single points (then called rouges) in the game. Therefore, the CRU simply appended 25-yard end zones to the ends of the existing 110-yard field, creating a much larger field of play. Since moving the goal posts back 25 yards would have made the scoring of field goals excessively difficult, and since the CRU did not want to reduce the prominence of field goals, the goal posts were left on the goal line where they remain today. However, the rules governing the scoring of singles were changed: teams were required to either kick the ball out of bounds through the end zone or force the opposition to down a kicked ball in their own end zone in order to be awarded a point. By 1986, at which point CFL stadiums were becoming bigger and comparable in development to their American counterparts in an effort to stay financially competitive, the CFL reduced the depth of the end zone to 20 yards.

== Scoring ==
A team scores a touchdown by entering its opponent's end zone while carrying the ball or catching the ball while being within the end zone. If the ball is carried by a player, it is considered a score when any part of the ball is directly above or beyond any part of the goal line between the pylons. In addition, a two-point conversion may be scored after a touchdown by the same means.

In Ultimate Frisbee, a goal is scored by completing a pass into the end zone.

== Size ==
The end zone in American football is 10 yards long by 53 1/3 yards (160 feet) wide. A full-sized end zone in Canadian football is 20 yards long by 65 yards wide. Prior to the 1980s, the Canadian end zone was 25 yards long. The first stadium to use the 20-yard-long end zone was B.C. Place in Vancouver, which was completed in 1983. The floor of B.C. Place was (and is) too short to accommodate a field 160 yards in length. The shorter end zone proved popular enough that the CFL adopted it league-wide in 1986. At BMO Field, home to the Toronto Argonauts, the end zones are only 18 yards. Like their American counterparts, Canadian endzones are marked with four pylons.

In Canadian football stadiums that also feature a running track, it is usually necessary to truncate the back corners of the end zones, since a rectangular field 150 yards long and 65 yards wide will not fit completely inside an oval-shaped running track. Such truncations are marked as straight diagonal lines, resulting in an end zone with six corners and six pylons. As of 2019, Montreal's Percival Molson Stadium is the only CFL stadium that has the rounded-off end zones.

During the CFL's failed American expansion in the mid-1990s, several stadiums, by necessity, used 15-yard end zones (some had end zones that were even shorter than 15 yards); only Baltimore and San Antonio had the endzones at the standard 20 yards.

Ultimate Frisbee uses an end zone 40 yards wide and 20 yards deep (37 m × 18 m).

== The goal post ==
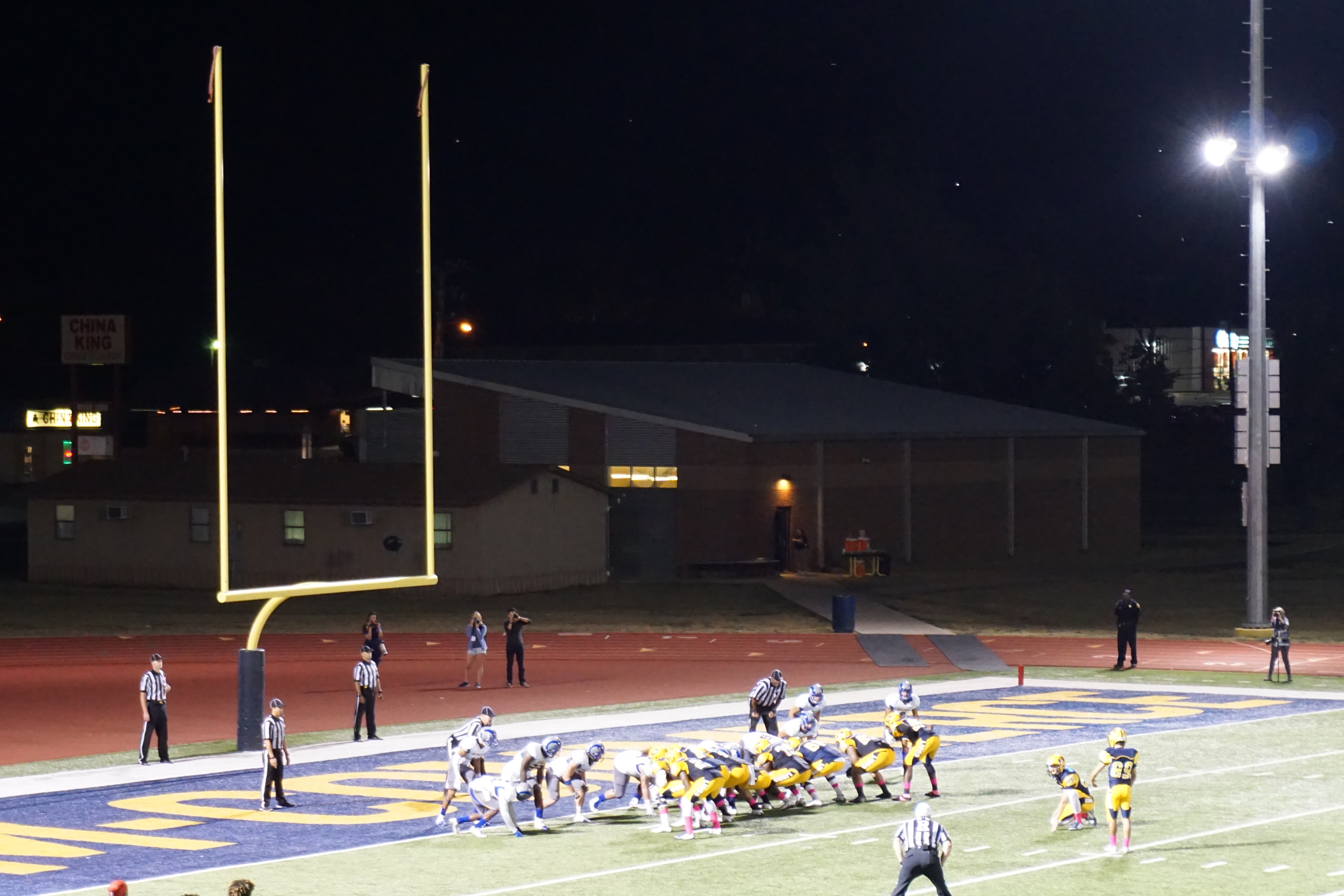
Goal post at one end of a college football field

The location and dimensions of a goal post differ from league to league, but it is usually within the boundaries of the end zone. In earlier football games (both professional and collegiate), the goal post began at the goal line, and was usually an H-shaped bar. Nowadays, for player safety reasons, almost all goal posts in the professional and collegiate levels of American football are T-shaped (resembling a slingshot), and reside just outside the rear of both end zones; such goalposts, first seen in 1966, were invented by Jim Trimble and Joel Rottman in Montreal, Quebec, Canada.

The goal posts in Canadian football still reside on the goal line instead of the back of the end zones, partly because the number of field goal attempts would dramatically decrease if the posts were moved 20 yards back in that sport, and also because the larger end zone and wider field makes the resulting interference in play by the goal post a less serious problem.

At the high school level, it is not uncommon to see multi-purpose goal posts that include football goal posts at the top and a soccer net at the bottom; these are usually seen at smaller schools and in multi-purpose stadiums where facilities are used for multiple sports. When these or H-shaped goal posts are used in football, the lower portions of the posts are covered with several inches of heavy foam padding to protect the safety of the players.

== Livery ==
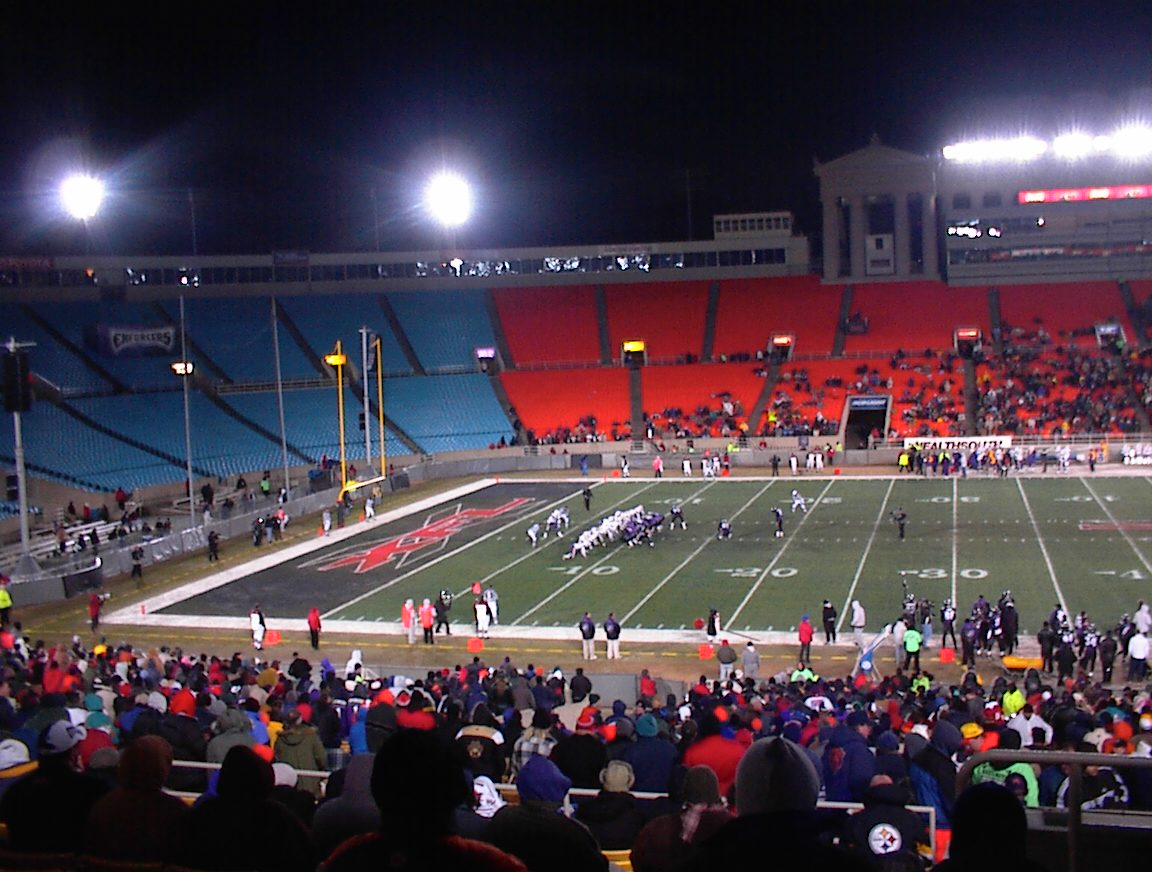
An XFL field, including end zone featuring the league's logo

Most professional and collegiate teams have their logo (livery), team name, or both painted on the surface of the end zone, with team colors filling the background. Many championship and bowl games at college and professional level are commemorated by the names of the opposing teams each being painted in one of the opposite end zones. In some leagues, along with bowl games, local, national, or bowl game sponsors may also have their logos placed in the end zone. In the CFL, fully painted end zones are nonexistent, though some feature club logos or sponsors. Additionally, the Canadian end zone, being a live-ball part of the field, often features yardage dashes (usually marked every five yards), not unlike the field of play itself.

In many places, particularly in smaller high schools and colleges, end zones are undecorated, or have plain white diagonal stripes spaced several yards apart, in lieu of colors and decorations. One notable use of this design in major college football is the Notre Dame Fighting Irish, who have both end zones at Notre Dame Stadium painted with nine diagonal 42º white lines at each end signifying Notre Dame's founding in 1842 (eighteen lines at 42º) and directed towards the Main Building and its golden dome. In professional football, since 2004, the Pittsburgh Steelers of the NFL have the south end zone at Acrisure Stadium (formerly Heinz Field) painted with diagonal-lines during most of the regular season, with the north end zone featuring only the city name of Pittsburgh in yellow. This is done because Acrisure Stadium, which has a natural grass playing surface, is also home to the Pittsburgh Panthers of college football and the markings simplify field conversion between the two teams' respective field markings and logos, with both teams sharing a secondary yellow color, but each having different primary colors. After the Panthers' season is over, the Steelers logo is painted in the south end zone.

Likewise, some end zones are painted in tribute to a recently deceased team figure or fan, as is done with the Steelers' AFC North rival Baltimore Ravens at M&T Bank Stadium, where the city name is painted as usual in the end zone, except for the "MO" portion, which is painted in gold, white or black in tribute to the late Mo Gaba, a young fan of both the Ravens and Orioles.

One of the major quirks of the American Football League was its use of unusual patterns such as argyle in its end zones, a tradition revived in 2009 by the Denver Broncos to celebrate the team's 50th anniversary, Denver itself a former AFL team. The original XFL standardized its playing fields so that all eight of its teams had uniform fields with the XFL logo in each end zone and no team identification.

== See also ==
- List of college football venues with non-traditional field colors
- Friend zone, a play on the term
