= Simon Chaves =

Canadian gridiron football player (born 1998)

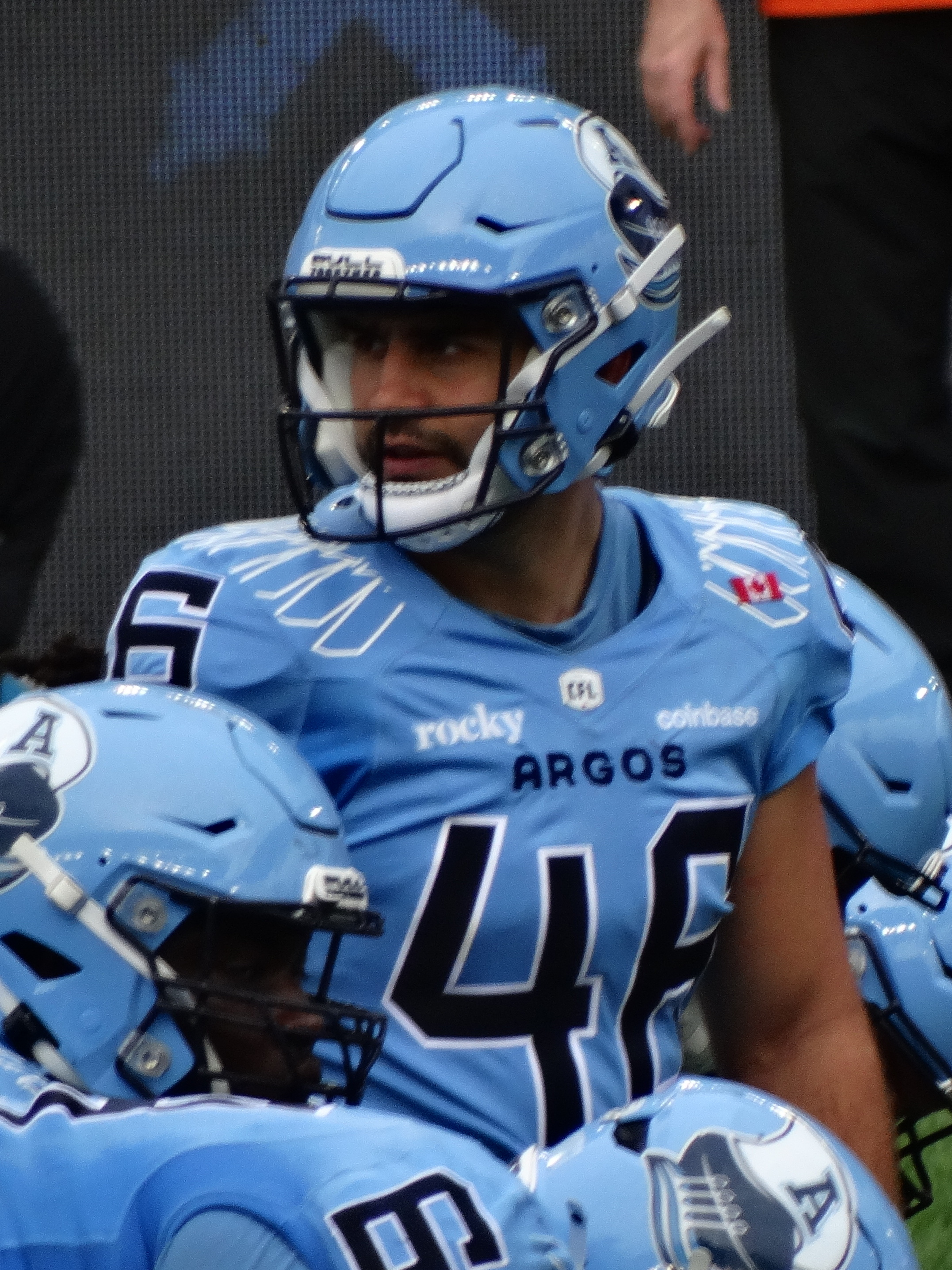
- Chaves with the Toronto Argonauts in 2025

No. 46, 56, 52
- Position: Long snapper

Personal information
- Born: June 21, 1998 (age 28)
- Listed height: 5 ft 10 in (1.78 m)
- Listed weight: 200 lb (91 kg)

Career information
- High school: Guelph CVI (Guelph, Ontario)
- University: Guelph (2017–2023)
- CFL draft: 2022: undrafted

Career history
- Winnipeg Blue Bombers (2022)*; Ottawa Redblacks (2024)*; Edmonton Elks (2024)*; Toronto Argonauts (2024); Ottawa Redblacks (2025); Hamilton Tiger-Cats (2025); Toronto Argonauts (2025)
- * Offseason or practice squad member only

Awards and highlights
- OUA second-team All-Star (2021, wrestling)
- Stats at CFL.ca

Simon Chaves (born June 21, 1998) is a Canadian former professional football long snapper who played in the Canadian Football League (CFL). He played U Sports football at Guelph.

== Early life ==
Simon Chaves was born on June 21, 1998. He played high school football at Guelph Collegiate Vocational Institute in Guelph, Ontario, as a quarterback.

== University career ==
Chaves first played U Sports football for the Guelph Gryphons of the University of Guelph from 2017 to 2021, spending time at long snapper, defensive back, and linebacker. The 2020 U Sports football season was cancelled due to the COVID-19 pandemic. He also participated in wrestling at Guelph, and was a Ontario University Athletics second-team All-Star during the 2021 season.

Chaves was invited to the 2022 CFL Ontario Regional Combine, but not the national CFL Combine. After going undrafted in the 2022 CFL draft, Chaves signed with the Winnipeg Blue Bombers on May 6, 2022. He was released on June 5, 2022, before the start of the 2022 CFL season, and then returned to Guelph for the 2022 U Sports football season. However, Chaves suffered a season-ending ACL injury in the 2022 season opener. As a seventh-year senior in 2023, Chaves played in eight games while posting three solo tackles. He studied criminal justice and public policy at Guelph.

== Professional career ==
Chaves signed with the Ottawa Redblacks on November 20, 2023. He was released on June 1, 2024.

Chaves was signed to the practice roster of the Edmonton Elks on July 15, 2024. He was released on July 21, 2024.

Chaves was signed to the Toronto Argonauts' practice roster on October 7, 2024. He was promoted to the active roster on October 10 and made his CFL debut on October 12 against the Blue Bombers. He was moved back to the practice roster on October 15. Chaves re-signed with the Argonauts on November 26, 2024. He was released on June 1, 2025.

Chaves signed with the Redblacks again on June 9, 2025. He dressed in six games for Ottawa before being released on July 29, 2025.

Chaves was then signed by the Hamilton Tiger-Cats on August 5, 2025, and dressed in two games for the team during the 2025 season.

After Argonauts long snapper Adam Guillemette was placed on the six-game injured list, Hamilton traded Chaves to Toronto on August 21, 2025, for a seventh-round pick in the 2027 CFL draft. Chaves retired on March 17, 2026.

== Personal life ==
Chaves' brother, Alexander Chaves, also wrestled at the University of Guelph.
