= End line =

American football boundary line

The end line, for American football or dead line for Canadian football, is a designated line at the back of the end zone. It is a marked field line, perpendicular to the sidelines, that designates out of bounds at each end of the playing field. It is measured 30 feet (10 yards) from the edge of the marked goal line toward the field of play to the inside edge of the marked end line, so that the marked line itself is considered out of bounds.

If the marked end line is touched or crossed over by any body part of the ball carrier prior to having solid control of the football, and the play has not been signaled over by the official prior to this, the down is considered over or out of bounds and results in the end of play.

If the current ball carrier fumbles the football within the field of play and it crosses an end-zone sideline or end line prior to any player gaining control of the ball, there are two scenarios this will result in: (1) If the end line/sideline is from the ball carriers' team end zone they are defending at that moment in the game, this will result in a safety; (2) If the end line/sideline is from the ball carriers' opponent’s end zone, this will result in a touchback and the opponent will gain possession of the football at their own 20 yard line.

If, during a punt or kickoff situation, the football crosses the end line, without any players touching or gaining control of it, this will result in a touchback.

The field goal post at each end of the playing field are centered above the end line.
