= Goal line (gridiron football) =

Line in American football and Canadian football

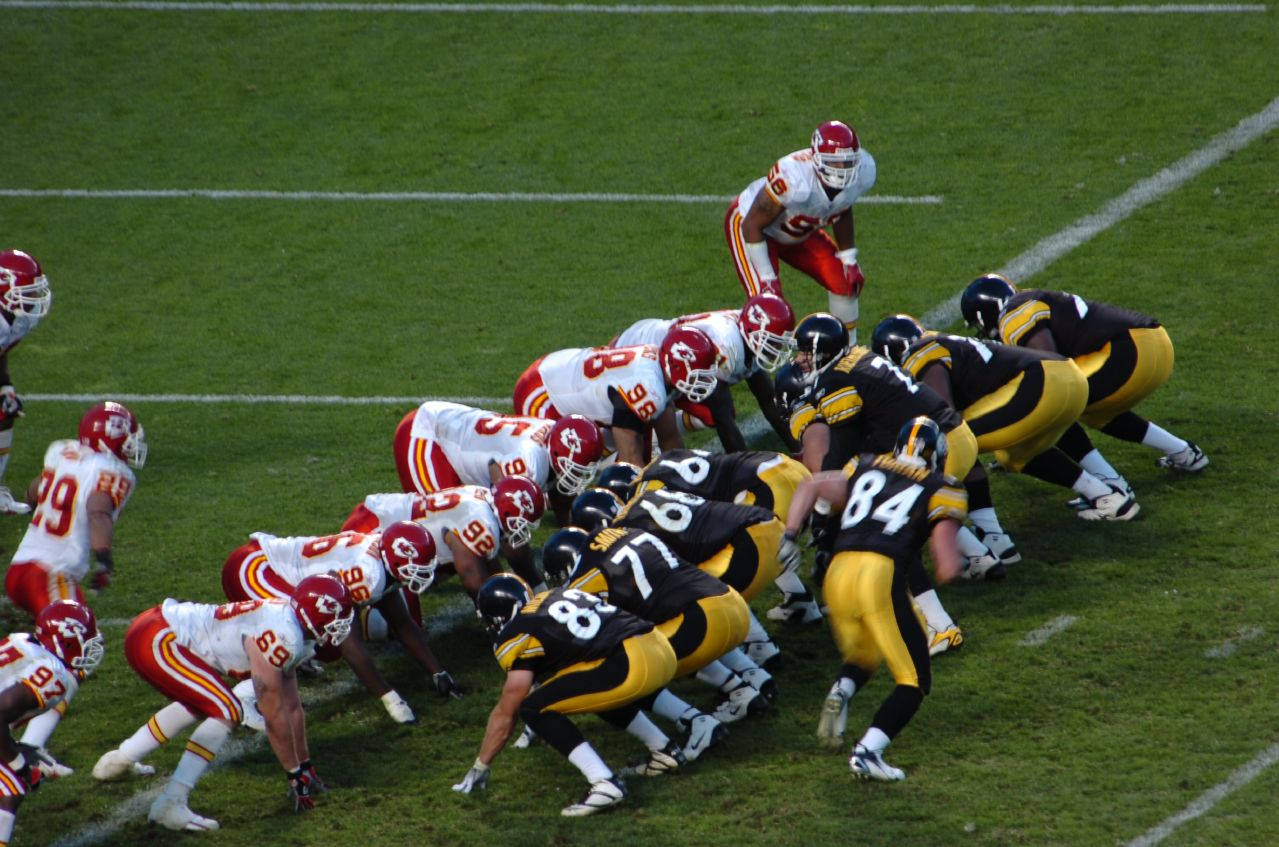
The Kansas City Chiefs (red) and the Pittsburgh Steelers (black) line up for a play on the goal line.

The goal line is the chalked or painted line dividing the end zone from the field of play in gridiron football. In American football the goal lines run 10 yards (9.1 m) parallel to the end lines, while in Canadian football they run 20 yards (18 m) parallel to the dead lines. In both football codes the distance is measured from the inside edge of the end line to the far edge of the goal line so that the line itself is part of the end zone. It is the line that must be crossed in order to score a touchdown.

If any part of the ball reaches any part of the imaginary vertical plane transected by this line while in-bounds and in possession of a player whose team is striving toward that end of the field, this is considered a touchdown and scores six points for the team whose player has advanced the ball to, or recovered the ball in, this position. This is in contrast with other sports like Association football and ice hockey, which require the puck or ball to pass completely over the goal line to count as a score.

If any member of the offensive team is downed while in possession of the ball behind his own team's goal line, this is called a safety and scores two points for the defensive team.

If, during the course of play, a loose ball travels past the goal line and is recovered within the end zone, then it is a touchdown if recovered by the team that scores in that end zone, or a touchback if recovered and downed by the opposing team

In the event of a kick recovered in one's own end zone, the entirety of the ball must pass the goal line in order for the ball to be considered a touchback, and to not be in the field of play.

== See also ==
- Glossary of American football terms
