= Out of bounds =

Concept in many sports related to the edge of the playing area

`

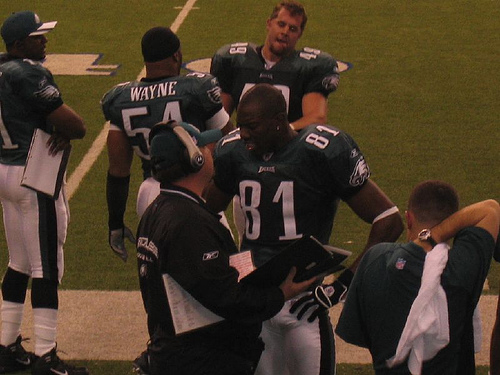
In gridiron football, a player who steps onto the sidelines during play is considered to be out of bounds. The horizontal white stripe near the bottom of this picture denotes the boundary, with legal play occurring above it.

In sports, out of bounds (or out-of-bounds) is the state of being outside the playing boundaries of the field. The legality of going out of bounds (intentionally or not), and the ease of prevention, vary by sport. Sports that use this term include American football, Canadian football, field lacrosse, basketball, rugby union, rugby league, and association football.

The boundary may be associated with the sidelines or touch-lines, lines which mark the outer boundaries of a sports field, running parallel to each other and perpendicular to the goal lines. The foul lines in baseball and boundary lines in cricket are similar concepts.

== Description ==
The terms out of bounds or out-of-bounds refers to an active participant or component of a game (e.g., player or ball ) being outside the playing boundaries of the field of a sport. The legality of going out of bounds (intentionally or not), and the ease of prevention, vary by sport. Due to the chaotic nature of play, it is normal in many sports for players and/or the ball to go out of bounds frequently during a game. In some cases, players may intentionally go or send the ball out of bounds when it is to their advantage.

== Sidelines ==
The sidelines are the white or colored lines which mark the outer boundaries of a sports field, running parallel to each other and perpendicular to the goal lines. The term is predominantly in use in American football, Canadian football, field lacrosse and basketball. In rugby union, rugby league and association football, they are known as touch-lines. The foul line is a similar concept in baseball. In cricket, the boundary lines can be marked by a rope.

=== Sidelines as an area of operations ===
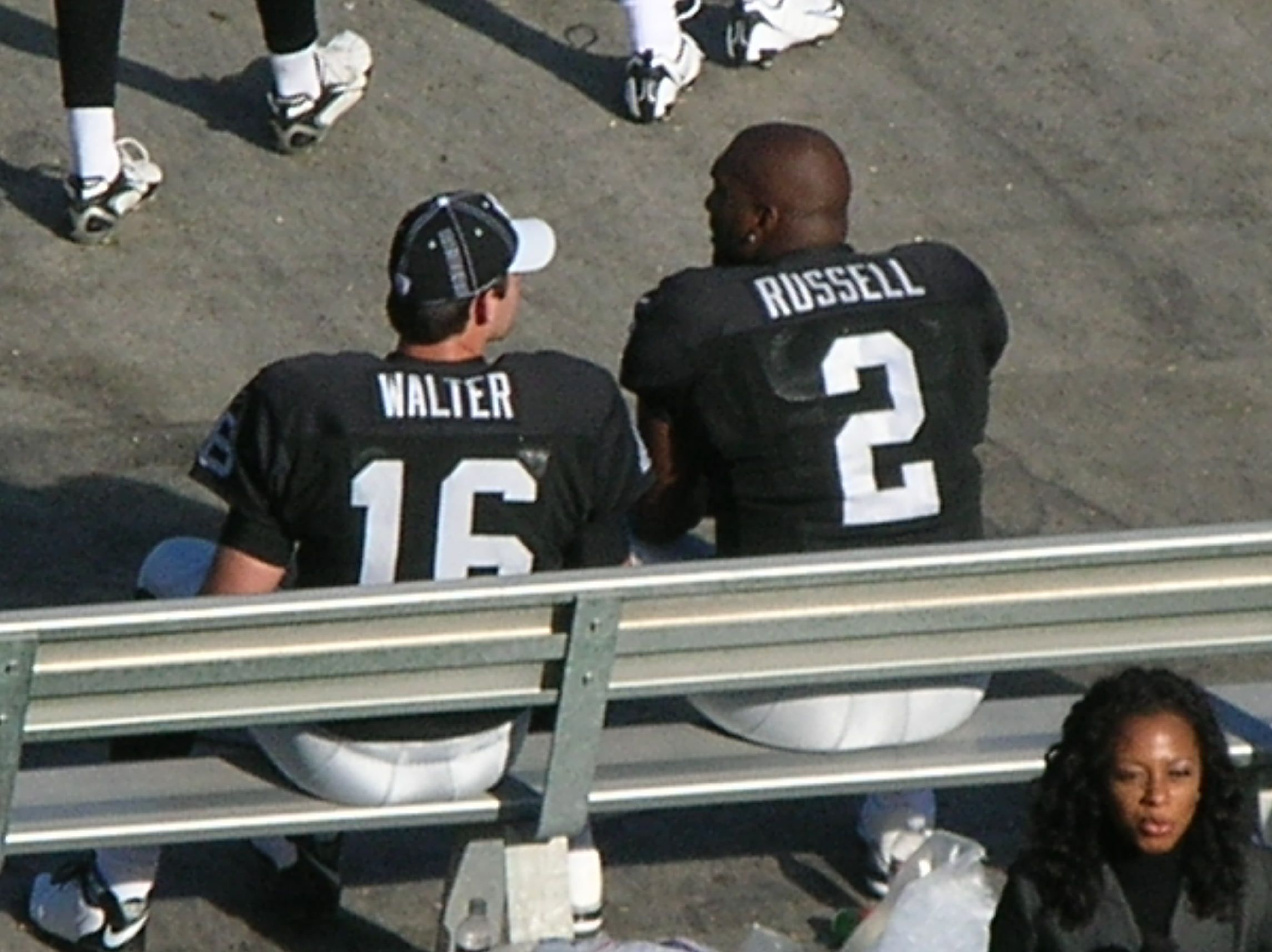
Players not actively participating in a game and coaches remain on the sidelines during play

The sidelines are also where the coaching staff and players out of play operate during a game. Sports in which the playing surface is bounded by walls, such as ice hockey, box lacrosse, and indoor football, do not use sidelines; in these sports, coaches and reserve players are positioned in recessed benches behind the walls.

== Usage by sport ==
=== Basketball ===
Basketball differs from many other sports including tennis, volleyball, and association football in that a ball that touches any part of an endline or sideline (or is touched by a player who is standing on or touching any part of the line) is considered out of bounds. When the ball goes out of bounds, it is awarded to the team that did not last touch it, regardless of which team last possessed the ball. The team entitled to the ball is required to throw it into the court.

=== Bat and ball games ===
==== Baseball ====
In baseball, there are two ways for a batted ball to be out-of-bounds. One is to exit the field of play between the foul lines (the foul lines themselves are fair territory). If this is achieved without touching the ground first, it is a home run, and the batter and teammates who are on base run to home plate and score a point for their team. If the ball bounced off the ground before exiting play, it is a ground rule double, and the batter and all runners not on third advance exactly two bases; runners only score if they were on second or third base. If the ball is hit outside the foul lines (such as to the side or behind the batter), it is a foul ball, and is equivalent to a strike, unless the batter has two strikes (in that instance, the strike count remains at two; the only exception to this is if the batter bunted the ball and it went foul, in which case the batter is called out). The foul ball bounds do not apply to fielders, who are allowed to try to catch a foul ball, which would put the batter out. While the rules of baseball define the angle of the foul lines, there are no set rules as to how large a field should be, and it varies from baseball field to baseball field.

Whether fielders can attempt to catch balls in dugouts or the stands varies. In major league baseball, it is possible in baseball for a dugout to be a factor in play. MLB rule 6.05(a) states that a fielder may reach into a dugout to catch a fly ball as long as one or both feet is on or over the playing field, and does not have a foot on the ground in the dugout when making the catch. MLB universal ground rules state that the player may subsequently enter the dugout after making the catch if his momentum is carrying him that way, but if he falls in the dugout as a result, the catch is allowed but baserunners advance in accordance with Rule 7.04(c).[3]

A live ball entering a dugout becomes dead and the batter-runner and any baserunners advance in accordance with Rule 7.04(c). However, a live ball bouncing off a dugout railing, if present, is still in play (unless a foul ball). Due to the dugouts' location in foul territory, live balls entering dugouts usually only occur after an errant throw by the defensive team.

Individual leagues at levels below MLB are free to set their own rules governing the dugouts as is appropriate for their league's ballparks and playing level. For example, the rule governing reaching into dugouts to catch fly balls would not apply in leagues where the dugouts are separated from the field by a chain-link fence that is taller than the players.

==== Cricket ====
For the batting team, when the ball touches the ground outside of the field (or a fielder player who is in contact with the same), it is worth either four runs (points) if it bounced in the field first, or potentially up to six runs otherwise. In either case, the ball becomes dead. Any catches attempted by fielders also become invalidated if the fielder is touching the ball and steps outside of the field boundary before completing the catch.

=== Football ===
Most football codes differ from sports such as basketball, volleyball, or table tennis where a player can "save" a ball by playing it while it is still in the air despite being over an out-of-bounds area; instead the ball is "out" if it fully crosses over a boundary line in the air.

==== Association football (soccer) ====
In association football, the ball becomes out of play when it has entirely crossed a goal line or touch line (in Association Football, this is called "Into Touch" which means that the ball has passed over the touchline). Play is restarted by a throw-in, goal kick or corner kick.

==== Australian rules ====
In Australian rules football, the ball is considered out of bounds when the whole of the ball is outside the plane of boundary line; or, if any part of the ball touches the behind post.

Under most circumstances, play is restarted by means of a boundary throw-in after it has gone out of bounds: the boundary umpire throws the ball high in the air and backwards over his head to a neutral contest 15-20m in from the line.

Under the following circumstances, a free kick awarded against the team who put the ball out of bounds:

- If the ball goes out of bounds on the full (without touching anything else first) from a kick
- If the ball is kicked, handballed or forced out of bounds without sufficient intent to keep it in play (decided at the discretion of the field umpire)

==== Gridiron code ====
In gridiron football, a play is considered to be dead if a ball or the player carrying the ball goes out of bounds. A forward pass thrown to a player who has one (in the NCAA) or both (in most other codes including the NFL) feet on the ground out of bounds is considered an incomplete pass regardless of whether it was caught or not.

In the NFL, the clock stops whenever a player carrying the ball steps out of bounds or fumbles the ball out of bounds. Within the last 2 minutes of the first half, the last 5 minutes of the game, or after a change of possession, the clock remains stopped until the next snap; at all other times, the clock restarts when the referee signals indicating that the ball has been placed for the next down.

In arena football, the field is walled so that play can almost never go out of bounds. At all other times, the clock keeps ticking. In college football, the clock stops when the ballcarrier goes out of bounds. If there are more than two minutes left in either half, the clock resumes when the umpire marks the ball as ready for the next play. If there are less than two minutes left in the half, the clock resumes upon the next play.

If the player with the ball goes out of bounds in his own end zone, in most cases, it is considered to be a safety in favor of the other team. A ball kicked out of bounds through the end zone is a touchback; in Canadian football, this situation usually is awarded a single point.

A kickoff that goes out of bounds is a penalty. Up through 1986, this required the kicking team to rekick the ball from five yards behind the spot of the original kickoff, unless the penalty was declined by the receiving team. In 1987, the NFL instituted a new rule, where the ball would be awarded to the receiving team five yards ahead of the spot where it went out of bounds.

In Canadian football, if a fumble goes out of bounds, the team of the last player to touch it gets possession.

==== Rugby league and rugby union ====
In rugby league and rugby union, and their derivatives, out of bounds is referred to as "touch". The long parallel lines marking the lateral boundary of the field are called touch-lines. The continuation of the touch-line beyond the goal line ending at the dead ball line is called the "touch-in-goal line". Touch lines are considered outside the playing field. When a ball is "kicked into touch", it means that it has been kicked out of the playing area into the touch area. Following the ball going out of bounds, play is restarted in a variety of ways, depending on the circumstances and rules of the particular game. The officials who monitor the touch-lines are the touch judges.

In rugby union the two touch-lines may not be more than 70 metres (230 ft) apart.

=== Ice hockey ===
In ice hockey, if the puck gets knocked out of play (such as into the player's benches, over the glass, or into the netting), a face-off shall be conducted at the nearest face-off dot to where the puck had gone out of play. However, if the puck is directly shot out of bounds over the glass deliberately by a player such as a goaltender or any defensive player within their own defensive zone, a delay of game minor penalty shall be assessed on the offending player.

=== Golf ===
In golf, "Out of Bounds" is beyond the boundaries of the golf course or any part of the course so marked by the committee in charge of the competition or the golf course.

If a ball is out of bounds, the player must play a ball, under penalty of one stroke, as nearly as possible at the spot from which the original ball was last played.

A golf ball is out of bounds when all of it lies out of bounds. A player may stand out of bounds to play a ball lying within bounds.

=== Skiing ===
In skiing, an out of bounds area is considered one that is outside of the area owned/serviced by a ski resort. Out of bounds areas can either be accessed by ducking under a rope or fence, or through marked gates. Usually, if one is caught 'cutting a rope', one will lose skiing privileges at the ski resort; depending on where one does so, they may also be arrested for trespassing. Out of bounds areas are not serviced by any type of lift, thus one must usually hike out of the area. Also, out of bounds areas are serviced by no ski patrol and are not checked for avalanche potential, thus one must be properly equipped for avalanche rescue and understand the dangers of a rescue.

=== Tennis ===
In tennis, an out is an error in which the ball lands outside the playing area.

=== Tag sports ===
In various tag games, non-tagging players who step out of the field are generally eliminated from play.

==== Atya patya ====
In atya patya, offensive players who step out of the field without keeping any part of their body grounded within the field are deemed out.

==== Kabaddi ====
In kabaddi, a player is declared "out" if they step out of bounds, with the opposing team scoring a point.

==== Kho kho ====
In kho kho, defensive players who step outside the field are automatically declared "out", with the offensive team scoring points as if they had tagged those defensive players.

== See also ==
- Rugby league playing field
- Rugby union playing field
- Soccer field
