= Dru Brown =

American gridiron football player (born 1997)

- Brown with the Winnipeg Blue Bombers in 2026

No. 4 – Winnipeg Blue Bombers
- Position: Quarterback
- Roster status: Active
- CFL status: American

Personal information
- Born: March 21, 1997 (age 29); Palo Alto, California, U.S.
- Listed height: 5 ft 11 in (1.80 m)
- Listed weight: 200 lb (91 kg)

Career information
- High school: Los Gatos (Los Gatos, California)
- College: San Mateo (2015); Hawaii (2016–2017); Oklahoma State (2018–2019)
- NFL draft: 2020: undrafted

Career history
- Winnipeg Blue Bombers (2020–2023); Ottawa Redblacks (2024–2026); Winnipeg Blue Bombers (2026–present)

Awards and highlights
- Grey Cup champion (2021)

Career CFL statistics as of 2025
- Passing completions: 610
- Passing attempts: 891
- Passing yards: 7,832
- TD–INT: 46–22
- Rushing yards: 188
- Rushing touchdowns: 5
- Stats at CFL.ca

Dru Brown (born March 21, 1997) is an American professional football quarterback for the Winnipeg Blue Bombers of the Canadian Football League (CFL). He played college football for the Oklahoma State Cowboys and Hawaii Rainbow Warriors.

== College career ==
Brown did not start until his senior season of high school and did not receive any Division I offers. He attended the College of San Mateo in his freshman year, playing in 11 games, and completed 104 of 194 passes for 1,870 yards and 21 touchdowns. He then transferred to the University of Hawaiʻi at Mānoa for the 2016 season.

=== Hawaii ===
==== 2016 ====
After not playing in the Rainbow Warriors' first three games, Brown entered their fourth game against the Arizona Wildcats in the second half, replacing Ikaika Woolsey. Brown was able to direct the Rainbow Warriors to three touchdown drives in the second half, but they lost to Arizona 47–28. He was named the starting quarterback before the Rainbow Warriors match against Nevada Wolf Pack. Against the Middle Tennessee Blue Raiders in the 2016 Hawaii Bowl, he threw for 274 yards and four touchdowns while also accounting for a rushing touchdown en route to a 52–35 victory. He was also named one of the game's most valuable player for his efforts.

==== 2017 ====
Coming off of Hawaii's first bowl victory in ten years, Brown was once again named the starting quarterback for the 2017 season. He threw for 2,785 yards and 18 touchdowns that season on a struggling Rainbow Warriors team that lost nine of the last ten games, mostly attributed to a battered offensive line whose position coach left mid-way through the season, and top receiver John Ursua lost to a torn anterior cruciate ligament. After the 2017 season, he announced his intention to transfer, enrolled at Oklahoma State University as a graduate transfer, and was immediately eligible to play. He finished his career at Hawaii with 5,273 career passing yards and 37 touchdowns.

=== Oklahoma State ===
==== 2018 ====
At Oklahoma State, Brown joined a crowded QB room competing for the Cowboys starting quarterback job following the departure of the four-year starter Mason Rudolph. Brown was named the primary back-up quarterback to the starter Taylor Cornelius before the start of 2018 season. Despite playing in the Cowboys' 2018 Liberty Bowl, Brown was able to redshirt under the NCAA's new redshirt policy and keep his final year of eligibility.

==== 2019 ====
Following Cornelius' graduation and departure, Brown was one of the favorites to win the starting quarterback job, competing for it with redshirt freshman Spencer Sanders. Brown was once again named the primary back-up as Sanders was named the starting quarterback for the Cowboys' season opener against the Oregon State Beavers.

After Sanders suffered a hand injury in the middle of a game against the Kansas Jayhawks, Brown entered the game in relief and threw a touchdown pass on his first play. He finished the game with 3 completions on 5 attempts for 70 yards and a touchdown in the 31–6 victory. He started his first career game as a Cowboy against the West Virginia Mountaineers the following week, where he racked up 196 yards and two touchdowns in a 20–13 victory. For his performance against West Virginia, he was named the Big 12 Newcomer of the Week.

== Professional career ==
Pre-draft measurables
Height	Weight	Arm length	Hand span	Wingspan	40-yard dash	10-yard split	20-yard split	20-yard shuttle	Three-cone drill	Vertical jump	Broad jump
5 ft 11 1/8 in (1.81 m)	194 lb (88 kg)	30 7/8 in (0.78 m)	9 1/4 in (0.23 m)	6 ft 0 5/8 in (1.84 m)	4.72 s	1.59 s	2.75 s	4.40 s	7.14 s	36.0 in (0.91 m)	9 ft 4 in (2.84 m)
All values from Pro Day

=== Winnipeg Blue Bombers (first stint) ===
Following his college career, Brown was added to the Winnipeg Blue Bombers roster on March 11, 2020. However, he did not play in 2020 due to the cancellation of the 2020 CFL season. In 2021, he was the fourth-string quarterback and spent most of the year on the practice roster. However, after the Blue Bombers clinched first place, Brown dressed in his first professional game on November 13, 2023, against the Montreal Alouettes. He played in the final two regular season games in 2021, where he completed seven of 14 pass attempts for 49 yards. He did not dress in either of the team's post-season games and was on the practice roster for the team's 108th Grey Cup championship over the Hamilton Tiger-Cats.

During the first game of the 2022 Winnipeg Blue Bombers season, Brown came in to the game late in the fourth quarter to complete a game-winning field goal drive. He entered the game after starting quarterback Zach Collaros was pulled from play by injury spotters after he took a hit to the head. During the 2023 Winnipeg Blue Bombers season, Brown again took over the offence after Collaros left the game with an upper body injury after a high hit during a week 9 game against the Edmonton Elks. He brought the Bombers back from a 22 point deficit throwing for 307 yards and four touchdowns as the Bombers beat the Elks 38-29. He made two starts in 2023, winning both of them, and set a new CFL record for the most touchdown passes (9) without recording an interception.

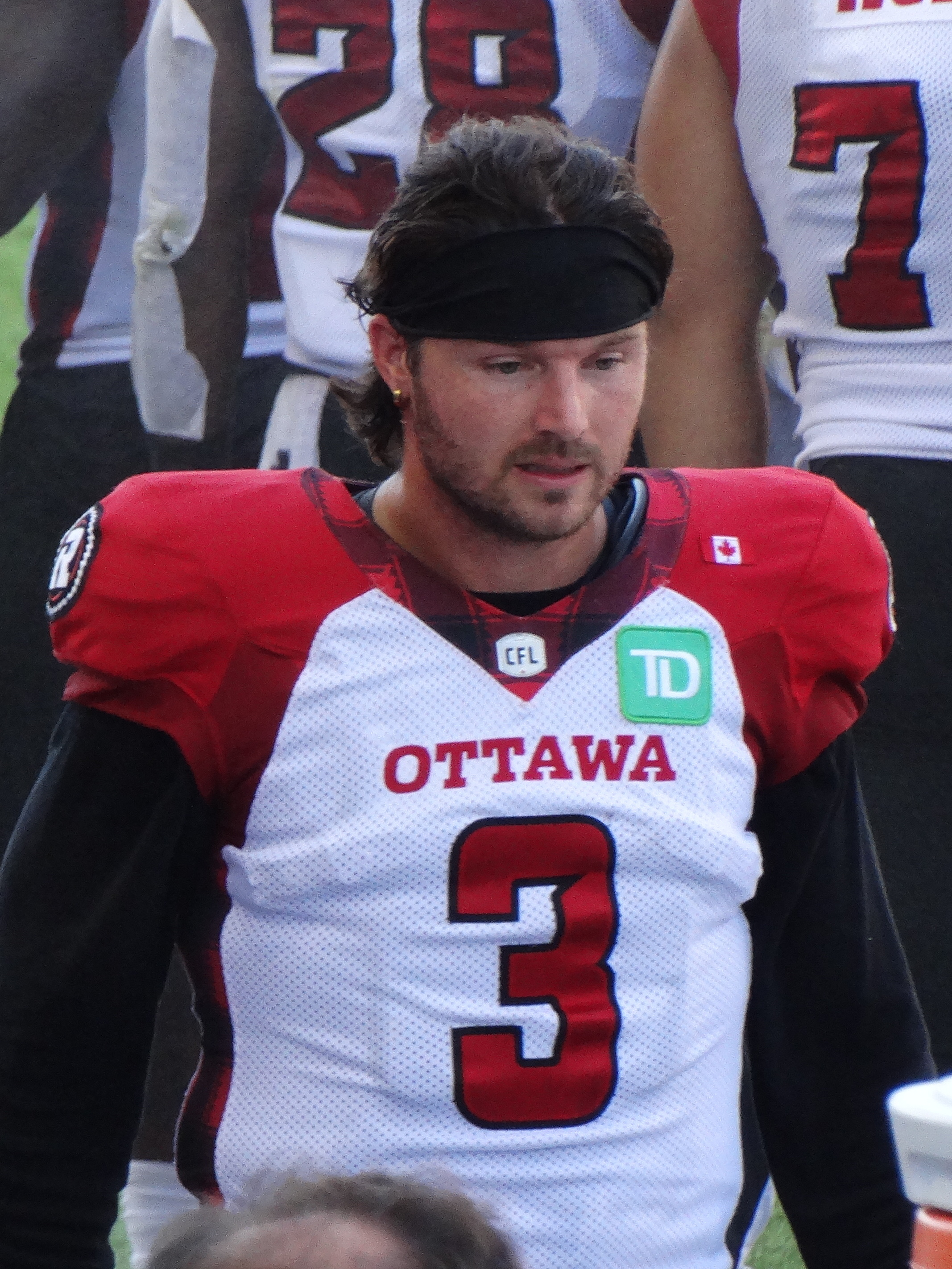
Brown with the Ottawa Redblacks in 2025

=== Ottawa Redblacks ===
As a pending free agent, Brown's playing rights were traded to the Ottawa Redblacks on January 18, 2024, in exchange for a fifth-round pick in the 2024 CFL draft. On January 24, 2024, it was announced that Brown had signed a two-year contract, with a minimum $286,000 plus $54,000 in playtime incentives in 2024, and a minimum $355,000 plus $45,000 in playtime incentives in 2025. Brown was named the team's starter ahead of the season and led the team to their first playoff appearance since 2018, eventually losing to the Toronto Argonauts in the Eastern Semi-Final. By season's end, Brown had started 15 games and passed for 3,959 yards, 18 touchdowns and 10 interceptions.

After an injury-plagued 2025 which saw him start just nine games and go 2-7 as a starter, Brown lost the starting job to Jake Maier heading into the 2026 season. He dressed as the backup quarterback in the first two games of the regular season, both losses, and did not see any playing time.

=== Winnipeg Blue Bombers ===
On June 23, 2026, it was announced that Brown had been traded back to the Winnipeg Blue Bombers along with a second-round selection in the 2027 CFL draft in exchange for a first-round selection in the 2027 draft and a conditional second-round selection in the 2028 CFL draft.

== Career statistics ==
=== CFL ===
==== Regular season ====
Year	Team	Games			Passing								Rushing			
Year	Team	GD	GS	Record	Cmp	Att	Pct	Yds	Y/A	TD	Int	Rtg	Att	Yds	Y/A	TD
2020	WPG	Season cancelled														
2021	WPG	2	0	—	7	14	50.0	49	3.5	0	0	58.3	7	44	6.3	0
2022	WPG	18	1	0–1	33	50	66.0	452	9.0	5	2	111.4	19	39	2.1	3
2023	WPG	18	2	2–0	62	89	69.7	983	11.0	9	0	139.9	11	30	2.7	2
2024	OTT	17	15	8–6–1	312	464	67.2	3,959	8.5	18	10	97.2	14	57	4.1	0
2025	OTT	11	9	2–7	196	274	71.5	2,389	8.7	14	10	99.8	9	18	2.0	0
2026	OTT	2	0	—	DNP											
2026	WPG	14	6	2–4	137	196	69.9	1,687	8.6	10	7	98.3	4	24	6.0	1
CFL career		82	33	14–18–1	747	1,087	68.7	9,519	8.8	56	29	101.9	64	212	3.3	6

==== Postseason ====
Year	Team	Games			Passing								Rushing			
Year	Team	GD	GS	Record	Cmp	Att	Pct	Yds	Y/A	TD	Int	Rtg	Att	Yds	Y/A	TD
2021	WPG	0	0	—	DNP											
2022	WPG	2	0	—	1	1	100.0	12	12.0	0	0	111.4	0	0	0.0	0
2023	WPG	2	0	—	DNP											
2024	OTT	1	1	0–1	46	61	75.4	476	7.8	3	2	100.2	3	3	1.0	0
2026	WPG	2	1	1–0	18	30	60.0	206	6.9	2	2	75.1	0	0	0.0	0
CFL career		7	2	1–1	65	92	70.7	694	7.5	5	4	92.4	3	3	1.0	0

=== College ===
Year	Team	Games			Passing								Rushing			
Year	Team	GP	GS	Record	Cmp	Att	Pct	Yds	Y/A	TD	Int	Rtg	Att	Yds	Avg	TD
2015	San Mateo	11	11	7–4	104	194	53.6	1,879	9.7	21	8	162.4	63	188	3.0	6
2016	Hawaii	13	10	6–4	209	335	62.4	2,488	7.4	19	7	139.3	88	306	3.5	4
2017	Hawaii	12	12	3–9	254	412	61.7	2,785	6.8	18	8	129.0	58	7	0.1	2
2018	Oklahoma State	1	0	—	0	0	0.0	0	0.0	0	0	0.0	0	0	0.0	0
2019	Oklahoma State	7	3	1–2	72	107	67.3	810	7.6	7	1	150.6	23	6	0.3	1
Career		44	36	17−19	639	1,048	58.1	7,962	8.4	65	24	149.1	132	507	3	13
