= 2027 CFL season =

Canadian Football League season

- Duration: May – October, 2027

114th Grey Cup
- Date: November 7, 2027
- Venue: Mosaic Stadium, Regina

CFL seasons
- ← 2026 2028 →

Locations of the active CFL teams West East

The 2027 CFL season is scheduled to be the 73rd season of modern professional Canadian football. Officially, it would be the 69th season of the Canadian Football League. Regina is scheduled to host the 114th Grey Cup on November 7, 2027. The league announced that the season would begin on Victoria Day weekend, so the regular season would start on or about May 20 and end on or about October 11. This will also be the first season to feature new field dimensions and a new playoff format.

== CFL news in 2027 ==
=== Salary cap ===
According to the new collective bargaining agreement, the 2027 salary cap is scheduled to be at least $6,430,514, due to the revenue sharing increase from 2026. Including non-football related services of $110,000, the total salary expenditure cap will be at or above $6,540,514. This will be the fourth season that players will receive revenue sharing, which will be set at 28% this season. The minimum player salary will be set at $75,000, which increases from the $70,000 minimum used from 2023 to 2026.

=== Rule changes ===
On September 22, 2025, league commissioner Stewart Johnston announced that a series of significant rule changes would come into effect for this season.

- Endline goalposts: The goal posts will move from the goal line to the end line.
- 15-yard end zones: To accommodate for the goal post changes, the endzones will be reduced from 20 yards deep to 15 yards. This will also ensure uniformity across the league as the Toronto Argonauts and Montreal Alouettes have had short end zones due to field limitations.
- 100-yard field: The field length will be reduced from 110 yards to 100 yards.

The field changes were widely condemned by fans of the league, who felt the changes were driven by profit, and the league was slowly becoming more "Americanized".

=== Schedule changes ===
On April 28, 2026, the CFL announced that the 2027 season schedule would begin on Victoria Day weekend, which would be two weeks earlier than the previous earliest start in league history (June 4, 2026, in the 2026 CFL season). This also results in many offseason activities moving up two weeks earlier, including the CFL Combine, 2027 CFL draft, and training camp. The regular season would end on Thanksgiving weekend, potentially jeopardizing the Thanksgiving Day Classic which would host the final games of the season, if it continues to be played.

The league also announced that the post-season would feature substantial changes with nine games being played over four weeks as opposed to the previous format of five games being played over three weeks. In the first round of games, the teams finishing first and second in each division will play each other with the winners advancing to the third round, the Grey Cup Semi-Finals (No longer called division championships), and the losers advancing to the round two elimination games. Also in the first round, the fifth placed team will play the eighth place team and the sixth place team will play the seventh place team with the winners advancing to the round two elimination games. In the second round, the winners of the elimination games will advance to the Grey Cup Semi-Finals. This results in eight of nine teams qualifying for the post-season while both Grey Cup participants will need at least two wins to qualify for the championship game.

==== Playoff bracket ====
Division Showdowns and Play-ins
October 15-16
1E
2E
October 15-16
5
8
October 15-16
6
7
October 15-16
1W
2W

Elimination round
October 23
3
October 23
4

Semi-finals
October 30
1
October 30
2

114th Grey Cup
November 7

Week 1. Division Showdowns and Play-ins: In the Division Showdowns, top two teams from each division face each other. In the Play-ins, the top 4 teams finished outside top 2 of their division, seeded 5 to 8, face each other, with the matchups based on seeding. Division leaders hosts the Division Showdown games, while higher seeded teams hosts the Play-in games.
At the end of the Division Showdowns, winning teams will be seeded 1 and 2, while the losing teams will be seeded 3 and 4, based on their regular season record and the standard ranking procedure.
Week 2. Elimination round: Losing teams of Division Showdowns hosts winning teams of Play-ins. Matchups are based on seedings.
Week 3. Semi-finals: Winning teams of Division Showdowns hosts winning teams of Elimination round. Matchups are based on seedings.

=== Coaching changes ===
Team	2026 HC	2027 HC	Comments
Winnipeg Blue Bombers	Mike O'Shea		Mike O'Shea served as head coach of the Bombers since being named head coach on December 4, 2013. O'Shea led the Bombers for 12 seasons. Leading them to two Grey Cups, breaking a 29-year drought in 2019. After two straight seasons of decline in 2025, and 2026, the Blue Bombers decedied it was time to part ways with O'Shea even with two years remaining on his contract. He finished his tenure with Winnipeg with an 126-86 record, coaching the most games in Blue Bombers history, as well as winning the most amount of games in Blue Bombers history, passing Bud Grant.

== Broadcasting ==
In Canada, the CFL's broadcast rights will expire after the 2026 CFL season, although the league had indicated a preference to continue working with Bell Media, which have held exclusive rights since 2008. The league's United States broadcast rights are also set to expire after 2026.

On May 28, 2026, the CFL announced a six-year extension to Bell Media's contract beginning with the 2027 season for TSN, CTV, and RDS, whilst also announcing a separate deal with DAZN to exclusively stream one weekly Saturday night game and two Saturday night playoff games on the platform.
