= 2027 CFL global draft =

Canadian football draft

General information
- Sport: Canadian football
- Date: April 14, 2027
- Location: Toronto, Ontario

Overview
- 18 total selections in 2 rounds
- League: Canadian Football League

The 2027 CFL global graft is a selection of non-Canadian and non-American players by Canadian Football League (CFL) teams that is scheduled to take place on April 14, 2027. It will be the seventh CFL draft that pools all of the global players together after previously having separate drafts for Mexican players and European players in 2019.

== Draft format ==
If the league maintains the same format as the previous year, this year's draft will feature two rounds with a total of 18 selections. The draft order would be based on the waiver priority (reverse standings from the previous year).

== Trades ==
In the explanations below, (D) denotes trades that took place during the draft, while (PD) indicates trades completed pre-draft.

- None
