= 2027 CFL draft =

Canadian Football League selection of national players scheduled for spring 2027

General information
- Sport: Canadian football
- Date: April 13, 2027
- Location: Toronto, Ontario

Overview
- 74 total selections in 8 rounds
- League: CFL
- First selection: Ottawa Redblacks
- Most selections (11): Hamilton Tiger-Cats
- Fewest selections (7): Saskatchewan Roughriders; Winnipeg Blue Bombers; Toronto Argonauts

The 2027 CFL Canadian draft is a selection of national players by Canadian Football League teams that is scheduled to take place on April 13, 2027. Seventy-four players are scheduled to be chosen from among eligible players from Canadian Universities across the country, as well as Canadian players playing in the NCAA. That number is subject to change if there are any forfeited selections.

== Format ==
As per the 2022 collective bargaining agreement, the two teams that had National players featured in the highest percentage of snaps played in the 2026 CFL season will each be awarded an additional second-round pick.

== Top prospects ==
Source: CFL Scouting Bureau rankings.

Final ranking	January ranking	August ranking	Player	Position	University	Hometown
		1	Ty Benefield	Defensive back	Louisiana State	Altadena, CA
		2	Bryce Butler	Defensive lineman	Texas Tech	Toronto, ON
		3	Nick Osho	Running back	North Texas	Burnaby, BC
		4	Edwin Kolenge	Defensive lineman	Vanderbilt	Montreal, QC
		5	Nicolas Cruji	Offensive lineman	Charlotte	Toronto, ON
		6	Nicolas Kalume	Defensive lineman	Arkansas State	London, ON
		7	Jordan Lessard	Defensive back	Colorado State	Montreal, QC
		8	Dolapo Egunjobi	Offensive lineman	Tennessee–Martin	Winnipeg, MB
		9	Chris Dixon	Defensive lineman	South Dakota	Toronto, ON
		10	Leif Magnuson	Offensive lineman	Cal Poly	Saskatoon, SK
		11	Isaiah Hastings	Defensive lineman	Syracuse	Toronto, ON
		12	Nolan Latulippe	Offensive lineman	Cincinnati	Aylmer, QC
		13	Elijah St. John	Defensive lineman	Purdue	Ottawa, ON
		14	Dre Delinois	Linebacker	East Tennessee State	Chicoutimi, QC
		15	Gideon Bedada	Defensive lineman	Bryant	Calgary, AB
		16	Mateo Lucero	Offensive lineman	Tennessee Tech	Brampton, ON
		17	Ryan Hughes	Wide receiver	Wilfrid Laurier	Mississauga, ON
		18	B.J. Barrow	Running back	Rhode Island	Etobicoke, ON
		19	Ebenezer Bedada	Defensive lineman	Campbell	Calgary, AB
		20	Xavier Gaillardetz	Wide receiver	East Tennessee State	Trois-Rivières, QC

== Draft order ==
- Note: this order is subject to change once all conditional trades are known and the formal draft order is revealed by the league. If there are any more forfeited draft picks, that will also change the draft order.

=== Round one ===
Pick #	CFL Team	Player	Position	University
1	Ottawa Redblacks			
2	Hamilton Tiger-Cats			
3	Calgary Stampeders			
4	Toronto Argonauts			
5	Ottawa Redblacks (via Winnipeg)			
6	Saskatchewan Roughriders			
7	BC Lions			
8	Montreal Alouettes			
9	Edmonton Elks			

=== Round two ===
Pick #	CFL Team	Player	Position	University
10	Toronto Argonauts (via Ottawa)			
11	Hamilton Tiger-Cats			
12	Calgary Stampeders			
13	Toronto Argonauts			
14	Winnipeg Blue Bombers (via Ottawa via Winnipeg)			
15	Saskatchewan Roughriders			
16	BC Lions			
17	Montreal Alouettes			
18	Edmonton Elks			
19N				
20N				

=== Round three ===
Pick #	CFL Team	Player	Position	University
21	Ottawa Redblacks			
22	Hamilton Tiger-Cats			
23	Calgary Stampeders			
24	Toronto Argonauts			
25	Winnipeg Blue Bombers			
26	Saskatchewan Roughriders			
27	BC Lions			
28	Montreal Alouettes			
29	Edmonton Elks			

=== Round four ===
Pick #	CFL Team	Player	Position	University
30	Ottawa Redblacks			
31	Hamilton Tiger-Cats			
32	Calgary Stampeders			
33	Toronto Argonauts			
34	Winnipeg Blue Bombers			
35	Saskatchewan Roughriders			
36	BC Lions			
37	Montreal Alouettes			
38	Edmonton Elks			

=== Round five ===
Pick #	CFL Team	Player	Position	University
39	Ottawa Redblacks			
40	Hamilton Tiger-Cats			
41	Calgary Stampeders			
42	Toronto Argonauts			
43	Winnipeg Blue Bombers			
44	Ottawa Redblacks (via Saskatchewan)			
45	BC Lions			
46	Hamilton Tiger-Cats (via Montreal)			
47	Edmonton Elks			

=== Round six ===
Pick #	CFL Team	Player	Position	University
48	Ottawa Redblacks			
49	Hamilton Tiger-Cats			
50	Calgary Stampeders			
51	Hamilton Tiger-Cats (via Toronto)			
52	Winnipeg Blue Bombers			
53	Saskatchewan Roughriders			
54	BC Lions			
55	Montreal Alouettes			
56	Edmonton Elks			

=== Round seven ===
Pick #	CFL Team	Player	Position	University
57	Ottawa Redblacks			
58	Montreal Alouettes (via Hamilton)			
59	Calgary Stampeders			
60	Hamilton Tiger-Cats (via Toronto)			
61	Winnipeg Blue Bombers			
62	Saskatchewan Roughriders			
63	BC Lions			
64	Montreal Alouettes			
65	Edmonton Elks			

=== Round eight ===
Pick #	CFL Team	Player	Position	University
66	Hamilton Tiger-Cats (via Ottawa)			
67	Hamilton Tiger-Cats			
68	Calgary Stampeders			
69	Toronto Argonauts			
70	Winnipeg Blue Bombers			
71	Saskatchewan Roughriders			
72	BC Lions			
73	Montreal Alouettes			
74	Edmonton Elks			

== Trades ==
In the explanations below, (D) denotes trades that took place during the draft, while (PD) indicates trades completed pre-draft.

=== Round one ===
- Winnipeg → Ottawa (PD). Winnipeg traded a first-round pick in this year's draft and a conditional second-round pick in the 2028 CFL draft to Ottawa in exchange for Dru Brown and Winnipeg's original second-round pick in this year's draft.

=== Round two ===
- Ottawa → Toronto (PD). Ottawa traded a conditional third-round pick in this year's draft and a fourth-round pick in the 2026 CFL draft to Toronto in exchange for the playing rights to Luiji Vilain and a third-round pick in the 2026 CFL draft. This selection became a second-round pick on April 27, 2026, when Vilain signed with the Redblacks.
- Winnipeg → Ottawa → Winnipeg (PD). Winnipeg traded a second-round pick in this year's draft and the 13th overall pick in the 2026 CFL draft to Ottawa in exchange for the 10th overall pick in the 2026 CFL draft. Ottawa then traded this same second-round pick and Dru Brown to Winnipeg in exchange for a first-round pick in this year's draft and a conditional second-round pick in the 2028 CFL draft.

=== Round five ===
- Montreal → Hamilton (PD). Montreal traded a fifth-round pick in this year's draft to Hamilton in exchange for Julian Howsare and Hamilton's best seventh-round pick in this year's draft.
- Saskatchewan → Ottawa (PD). Saskatchewan traded a fifth-round pick in this year's draft to Ottawa in exchange for Brett Lauther.

=== Round six ===
- Toronto → Hamilton (PD). Toronto traded a sixth-round pick in this year's draft to Hamilton in exchange for Chris Kolankowski.

=== Round seven ===
- Toronto → Hamilton (PD). Toronto traded a seventh-round pick in this year's draft to Hamilton in exchange for Simon Chaves.
- Hamilton → Montreal (PD). Hamilton traded a seventh-round pick in this year's draft and Julian Howsare to Montreal in exchange for a fifth-round pick in this year's draft.

=== Round eight ===
- Ottawa → Hamilton (PD). Ottawa traded an eighth-round pick in this year's draft to Hamilton in exchange for Jevoni Robinson.

=== Conditional trades ===
- Toronto → Ottawa (PD). Toronto traded a conditional eighth-round pick in this year's draft to Ottawa in exchange for James Burnip.
