= 2024 Montreal Alouettes season =

CFL team season

- General manager: Danny Maciocia
- President: Mark Weightman
- Head coach: Jason Maas
- Home stadium: Percival Molson Memorial Stadium

Results
- Record: 12–5–1
- Division place: 1st, East
- Playoffs: Lost East Final
- Team MOP: Tyrice Beverette
- Team MODP: Tyrice Beverette
- Team MOC: Isaac Adeyemi-Berglund
- Team MOOL: Pier-Olivier Lestage
- Team MOST: James Letcher Jr.
- Team MOR: Geoffrey Cantin-Arku

Uniform
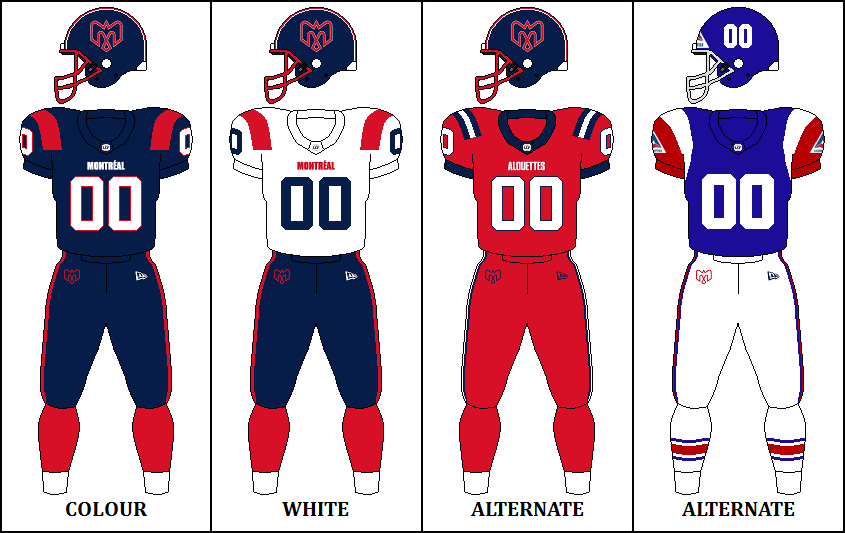

The 2024 Montreal Alouettes season was the 57th season for the team in the Canadian Football League (CFL) and their 69th overall. The Alouettes entered the season as defending Grey Cup champions following their victory in the 110th Grey Cup game. While on a bye in week 13, the Alouettes clinched a playoff berth for the fifth consecutive season. Following an Ottawa Redblacks loss in week 17, the Alouettes later clinched first place in the East Division for the first time since 2012. However, the Alouettes lost to the Toronto Argonauts in the East Final.

The 2024 CFL season was the second season with Jason Maas as the team's head coach and the fourth season with Danny Maciocia as the team's general manager.

The Montreal Alouettes drew an average home attendance of 21,302 in 2024.

== Offseason ==
=== CFL global draft ===
The 2024 CFL global draft took place on April 30, 2024. The Alouettes had two picks in the draft, selecting last in each round.

Round	Pick	Player	Position	Club/School	Nationality
1	9	Sam Clark	P	James Madison	Australia
2	18	Nouredin Nouili	OL	Nebraska	Germany

== CFL national draft ==
The 2024 CFL draft took place on April 30, 2024. The Alouettes had seven selections in the eight-round draft. Not including traded picks, the team selected ninth in each round of the draft due to their victory in the 110th Grey Cup game.

Round	Pick	Player	Position	School	Hometown
1	9	Geoffrey Cantin-Arku	LB	Memphis	Lévis, QC
3	29	Arthur Hamlin	DB	Colgate	Ottawa, ON
4	38	Micah Roane	DL	South Dakota	Chaska, MN
5	47	Frederik Antoine	WR	Laval	Quebec City, QC
6	56	Michael Herzog	RB	Hillsdale	Windsor, ON
7	65	Mohsen Jamal	WR	Western Ontario	London, ON
8	74	Vincent Delisle	DB	Laval	Quebec City, QC

== Preseason ==
=== Schedule ===
Week	Game	Date	Kickoff	Opponent	Results		TV	Venue	Attendance	Summary
Week	Game	Date	Kickoff	Opponent	Score	Record	TV	Venue	Attendance	Summary
A	Bye									
B	1	Sat, May 25	7:30 p.m. EDT	vs. Toronto Argonauts	W 30–13	1–0	RDS/CFL+	Molson Stadium	13,787	Recap
C	2	Fri, May 31	7:30 p.m. EDT	at Ottawa Redblacks	L 13–19	1–1	TSN/RDS	TD Place Stadium	N/A	Recap

# Games played with blue uniforms.

== Regular season ==
=== Standings ===
East Division
Team	GP	W	L	T	Pts	PF	PA	Div	Stk	
Montreal Alouettes	18	12	5	1	25	455	404	6–2	L2	Details
Toronto Argonauts	18	10	8	0	20	513	479	3–5	L1	Details
Ottawa Redblacks	18	9	8	1	19	443	488	3–5	W1	Details
Hamilton Tiger-Cats	18	7	11	0	14	495	557	4–4	L1	Details

=== Schedule ===
Week	Game	Date	Kickoff	Opponent	Results		TV	Venue	Attendance	Summary
Week	Game	Date	Kickoff	Opponent	Score	Record	TV	Venue	Attendance	Summary
1	1	Thu, June 6	8:30 p.m. EDT	at Winnipeg Blue Bombers	W 27–12	1–0	TSN/RDS/CBSSN	Princess Auto Stadium	30,140	Recap
2	2	Fri, June 14	9:00 p.m. EDT	at Edmonton Elks	W 23–20	2–0	TSN/RDS	Commonwealth Stadium	15,790	Recap
3	3	Thu, June 20	7:30 p.m. EDT	vs. Ottawa Redblacks	W 47–21	3–0	TSN/RDS	Molson Stadium	23,035	Recap
4	4	Fri, June 28	7:30 p.m. EDT	at Toronto Argonauts	W 30–20	4–0	TSN/RDS	BMO Field	11,165	Recap
5	5	Sat, July 6	7:00 p.m. EDT	vs. Calgary Stampeders	W 30–26	5–0	TSN/RDS/CBSSN	Molson Stadium	20,652	Recap
6	6	Thu, July 11	7:30 p.m. EDT	vs. Toronto Argonauts	L 18–37	5–1	TSN/RDS	Molson Stadium	18,088	Recap
7	Bye									
8	7	Thu, Jul 25	7:30 p.m. EDT	vs. Saskatchewan Roughriders	W 20–16	6–1	TSN/RDS	Molson Stadium	19,653	Recap
9	8	Fri, Aug 2	7:30 p.m. EDT	at Hamilton Tiger-Cats	W 33–16	7–1	TSN/RDS/CBSSN	Tim Hortons Field	20,426	Recap
10	9	Sat, Aug 10	7:00 p.m. EDT	vs. Hamilton Tiger-Cats	W 33–23	8–1	TSN/RDS/CBSSN	Molson Stadium	22,137	Recap
11	10	Fri, Aug 16	9:00 p.m. EDT	at Saskatchewan Roughriders	W 27–24	9–1	TSN/RDS/CBSSN	Mosaic Stadium	28,123	Recap
12	11	Sun, Aug 25	7:00 p.m. EDT	vs. Edmonton Elks	W 21–17	10–1	TSN/RDS/CBSSN	Molson Stadium	19,048	Recap
13	Bye									
14	12	Fri, Sept 6	7:30 p.m. EDT	vs. BC Lions	L 23–37	10–2	TSN/RDS/CBSSN	Molson Stadium	23,035	Recap
15	13	Sat, Sept 14	7:00 p.m. EDT	at Calgary Stampeders	T 19–19 (2OT)	10–2–1	TSN/RDS	McMahon Stadium	20,187	Recap
16	14	Sat, Sept 21	3:00 p.m. EDT	at Ottawa Redblacks	W 24–12	11–2–1	CTV/RDS	TD Place Stadium	23,530	Recap
17	15	Sat, Sept 28	7:00 p.m. EDT	at Toronto Argonauts	L 31–37	11–3–1	TSN/RDS	BMO Field	14,856	Recap
18	Bye									
19	16	Mon, Oct 14	1:00 p.m. EDT	vs. Ottawa Redblacks	W 19–12	12–3–1	TSN/RDS/CBSSN	Molson Stadium	23,035	Recap
20	17	Sat, Oct 19	7:00 p.m. EDT	at BC Lions	L 3–27	12–4–1	TSN/RDS	BC Place	28,436	Recap
21	18	Sat, Oct 26	3:00 p.m. EDT	vs. Winnipeg Blue Bombers	L 27–28	12–5–1	CTV/RDS	Molson Stadium	23,035	Recap

# Games played with blue uniforms.
# Games played with white uniforms.
# Games played with red uniforms.
# Games played with 1974 uniforms.

== Post-season ==
=== Schedule ===
Game	Date	Kickoff	Opponent	Results		TV	Venue	Attendance	Summary
Game	Date	Kickoff	Opponent	Score	Record	TV	Venue	Attendance	Summary
East Semi-Final	Sat, Nov 2	Bye							
East Final	Sat, Nov 9	3:00 p.m. EST	vs. Toronto Argonauts	L 28–30	0–1	CTV/TSN/RDS	Molson Stadium	23,035	Recap

# Games played with blue uniforms.

== Roster ==
2024 Montreal Alouettes final roster
**Quarterbacks**: 10 Davis Alexander; 4 Dominique Davis; 7 Cody Fajardo; **Running backs**: 39 David Dallaire; 25 Walter Fletcher; 38 Jacob Mason; 21 Sean Thomas Erlington; **Receivers**: 3 Régis Cibasu; 11 Kaion Julien-Grant; 89 James Letcher Jr.; 81 Austin Mack; 14 Charleston Rambo; 85 Tyler Snead; 17 Cole Spieker	**Offensive linemen**: 62 Nick Callender T; 53 Philippe Gagnon G; 67 Jesse Gibbon G; 54 Justin Lawrence C; 66 Pier-Olivier Lestage G; 51 Kristian Matte G; 61 Jamar McGloster T; **Defensive linemen**: 91 Isaac Adeyemi-Berglund DE; 44 Jordan Domineck DE; 23 Avery Ellis DE; 99 Antonio Moultrie DE/DT; 96 Lwal Uguak DE; 95 Derek Wiggan DT; 98 Dylan Wynn DT	**Linebackers**: 26 Tyrice Beverette; 19 Geoffrey Cantin-Arku; 49 Frédéric Chagnon; 34 Alexandre Gagné; 42 Tyrell Richards; 1 Darnell Sankey; **Defensive backs**: 43 Lorenzo Burns; 30 Bryce Cosby; 24 Marc-Antoine Dequoy; 48 Kabion Ento; 33 Arthur Hamlin; 12 Najee Murray; 22 Dionté Ruffin; 37 Wes Sutton	**Special teams**: 50 Louis-Philippe Bourassa LS; 72 José Maltos K; 36 Joseph Zema P; **Practice roster**: 80 Jose Barbon WR; 97 Jerron Cage DT; 70 Sam Clark P; 46 K. D. Davis LB; 60 Ezzat Elnagmi T; 90 Philippe Lemieux-Cardinal DE; 16 James Morgan QB; 83 Daniel Oladejo WR; 59 Micah Roane DE; 31 Titus Wall DB	**Injured list**: 82 Nate Behar SB; 32 Tysen-Otis Copeland DB; 15 David Côté K; 65 Joshua Donovan T; 5 Caleb Evans QB; 87 Shedler Fervius SB; 9 Brock Gowanlock DE; 69 Theo Grant G; 94 Mustafa Johnson DT; 29 Cre'Von LeBlanc DB; 88 Tyjon Lindsey WR; 8 Nafees Lyon DB; 55 Nouredin Nouili G; 6 Tyson Philpot WR; 35 Stevie Scott RB; 2 Reggie Stubblefield DB; 68 Donny Ventrelli T; 84 Reggie White Jr. SB	**Suspended list**: -- Timarcus Davis DB; -- Emil Ekiyor Jr. G; 0 Shawn Lemon DE; -- Linden Stephens DB; -- Naasir Watkins T
Italics indicate American player • **Bold** indicates Global player

== Coaching staff ==
Montreal Alouettes staff
Front office: Owner – Pierre Karl Péladeau; President & CEO – Mark Weightman; General Manager – Danny Maciocia; Assistant General Manager – Pier-Yves Lavergne; Assistant to the General Manager and Player Personnel – Marcel Desjardins; Senior Director of Football Operations – Éric Deslauriers; Senior Personnel Executive – Jean-Marc Edmé; Director of Player Personnel – Byron Archambault; Manager of Football Operations – Allyson Sobol; Head Video Coordinator – Rico Morotti; Head coach: Head Coach – Jason Maas; Assistant Head Coach/Special Teams Coordinator – Byron Archambault; Offensive coaches: Offensive Coordinator & Quarterbacks – Anthony Calvillo; Offensive Line – Luc Brodeur-Jourdain; Receivers & Pass Game Coordinator – Michael Lionello; Running Backs – Dave Jackson; Assistant Offensive Line – David Brown	Defensive coaches: Defensive Coordinator & Defensive Backs – Noel Thorpe; Linebackers – Greg Quick; Defensive Line – Corvey Irvin; Assistant Defensive Backs – Chandler Jones; Staff: Equipment Manager – Dominic Manno; Equipment Manager – David Deschamps; Head Athletic Therapist – Tristan Castonguay; Assistant Athletic Therapist - Dillon Warren; → Coaching staff
