= 2025 Montreal Alouettes season =

CFL team season

- General manager: Danny Maciocia
- Head coach: Jason Maas
- Home stadium: Percival Molson Memorial Stadium

Results
- Record: 10–8
- Division place: 2nd, East
- Playoffs: Lost Grey Cup
- Team MOP: Davis Alexander
- Team MODP: Isaac Adeyemi-Berglund
- Team MOC: Isaac Adeyemi-Berglund
- Team MOOL: Justin Lawrence
- Team MOST: Jose Maltos Diaz
- Team MOR: Travis Theis

Uniform
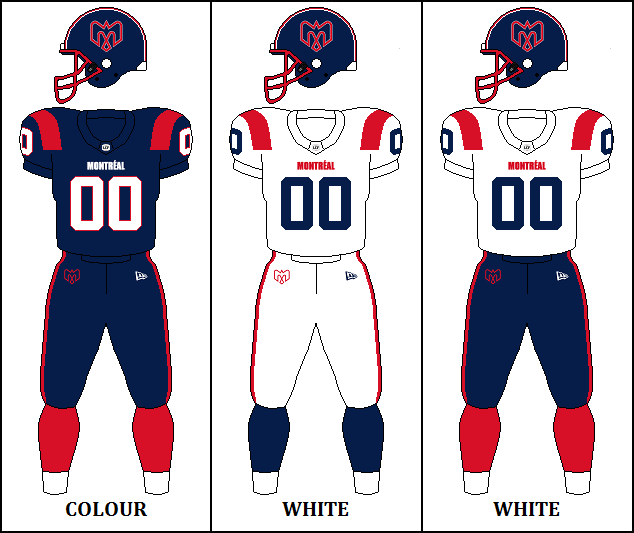

The 2025 Montreal Alouettes season was the 58th season for the team in the Canadian Football League (CFL) and their 70th overall. While on their bye week, the Alouettes qualified for the playoffs for the sixth consecutive season after the Ottawa Redblacks lost in week 18 and were eliminated from post-season contention. The Alouettes attempted to win their ninth Grey Cup championship, but were defeated in the championship game by the Saskatchewan Roughriders.

The 2025 CFL season is the third season with Jason Maas as the team's head coach and the fifth season with Danny Maciocia as the team's general manager.

The Montreal Alouettes drew an average home attendance of 21,132 in 2025.

== Offseason ==
=== CFL global draft ===
The 2025 CFL global draft took place on April 29, 2025. The Alouettes had two selections in the draft, holding the seventh pick in each round.

Round	Pick	Player	Position	School	Nationality
1	7	Joshua Sloan	P	Memphis	Australia
2	16	Joshua Hutley	P	Concord	Australia

== CFL national draft ==
The 2025 CFL draft took place on April 29, 2025. The Alouettes had nine selections in the eight-round draft. Not including traded picks or forfeitures, the team selected seventh in each round of the draft after finishing first in the 2024 league standings, but not qualifying for the 111th Grey Cup game.

Round	Pick	Player	Position	School	Hometown
1	5	Tiger Shanks	OL	Nevada–Las Vegas	Vancouver, BC
2	14	Nate Beauchemin	DB	Calgary	Kelowna, BC
3	23	Gabriel Lessard	LB	Montreal	Sainte-Julie, QC
3	26	Hakeem Harris	WR	Davenport	Markham, ON
4	35	Keanu Yazbeck	RB	Western	Kirkland, QC
5	44	Gabriel Maisonneuve	DL	Montreal	Gatineau, QC
6	53	Isaac Gaillaretz	WR	Laval	Trois-Rivières, QC
7	62	Jonathan Sénécal	QB	Montreal	Montreal, QC
8	70	Riley MacLeod	LB	Western	Hamilton, ON

== Preseason ==
=== Schedule ===
Week	Game	Date	Kickoff	Opponent	Results		TV	Venue	Attendance	Summary
Week	Game	Date	Kickoff	Opponent	Score	Record	TV	Venue	Attendance	Summary
A	Bye									
B	1	Sat, May 24	4:00 p.m. EDT	vs. Ottawa Redblacks	L 7–23	0–1	RDS	Molson Stadium	13,098	Recap
C	2	Fri, May 30	7:00 p.m. EDT	at Ottawa Redblacks	W 24–16	1–1	TSN/RDS	TD Place Stadium	17,820	Recap

# Games played with blue uniforms.

== Regular season ==
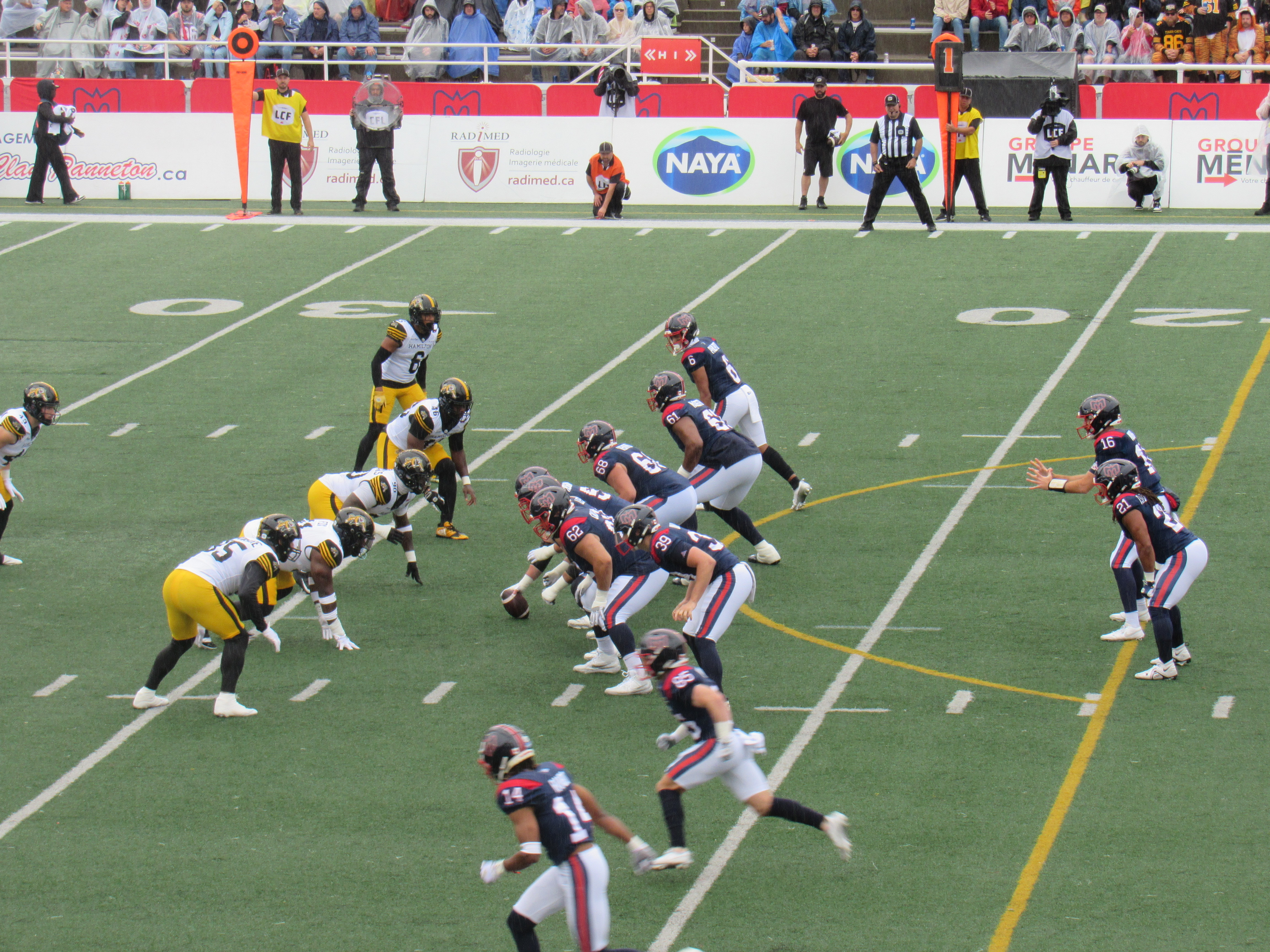
The Alouettes faced the Hamilton Tiger-Cats on September 6, 2025.

=== Standings ===
East Division
Team	GP	W	L	T	Pts	PF	PA	Div	Stk	
Hamilton Tiger-Cats	18	11	7	0	22	525	496	7–1	W1	Details
Montreal Alouettes	18	10	8	0	20	445	430	6–2	L1	Details
Toronto Argonauts	18	5	13	0	10	497	583	2–6	L5	Details
Ottawa Redblacks	18	4	14	0	8	417	537	1–7	L6	Details

=== Schedule ===
Week	Game	Date	Kickoff	Opponent	Results		TV	Venue	Attendance	Summary
Week	Game	Date	Kickoff	Opponent	Score	Record	TV	Venue	Attendance	Summary
1	1	Fri, June 6	7:30 p.m. EDT	vs. Toronto Argonauts	W 28–10	1–0	TSN/RDS	Molson Stadium	21,480	Recap
2	2	Fri, June 13	7:30 p.m. EDT	at Ottawa Redblacks	W 39–18	2–0	TSN/RDS	TD Place Stadium	21,441	Recap
3	3	Thu, June 19	9:00 p.m. EDT	at Edmonton Elks	W 38–28	3–0	TSN/RDS/CBSSN	Commonwealth Stadium	14,389	Recap
4	4	Fri, June 27	7:30 p.m. EDT	at Hamilton Tiger-Cats	L 17–35	3–1	TSN/RDS	Tim Hortons Field	20,911	Recap
5	5	Sat, July 5	7:00 p.m. EDT	vs. BC Lions	L 20–21	3–2	TSN/CTV/RDS/CBSSN	Molson Stadium	21,144	Recap
6	Bye									
7	6	Thu, July 17	7:30 p.m. EDT	vs. Toronto Argonauts	W 26–25	4–2	TSN/RDS/CBSSN	Molson Stadium	19,354	Recap
8	7	Thu, Jul 24	9:00 p.m. EDT	at Calgary Stampeders	W 23–21	5–2	TSN/RDS/CBSSN	McMahon Stadium	19,863	Recap
9	8	Sat, Aug 2	7:00 p.m. EDT	vs. Saskatchewan Roughriders	L 6–34	5–3	TSN/RDS/CBSSN	Molson Stadium	21,654	Recap
10	9	Fri, Aug 8	7:00 p.m. EDT	vs. Edmonton Elks	L 22–23	5–4	TSN/RDS	Molson Stadium	20,525	Recap
11	10	Sat, Aug 16	7:00 p.m. EDT	at BC Lions	L 18–36	5–5	TSN/RDS/CBSSN	BC Place	23,318	Recap
12	11	Thu, Aug 21	7:30 p.m. EDT	vs. Winnipeg Blue Bombers	L 13–26	5–6	TSN/RDS/CBSSN	Molson Stadium	20,310	Recap
13	Bye									
14	12	Sat, Sept 6	1:00 p.m. EDT	vs. Hamilton Tiger-Cats	L 9–26	5–7	TSN/RDS	Molson Stadium	20,612	Recap
15	13	Sat, Sept 13	7:00 p.m. EDT	at Saskatchewan Roughriders	W 48–31	6–7	TSN/RDS	Mosaic Stadium	26,951	Recap
16	14	Fri, Sept 19	7:00 p.m. EDT	at Toronto Argonauts	W 21–19	7–7	TSN/RDS	BMO Field	13,848	Recap
17	15	Fri, Sept 26	7:00 p.m. EDT	vs. Calgary Stampeders	W 38–20	8–7	TSN/RDS	Molson Stadium	22,070	Recap
18	Bye									
19	16	Mon, Oct 13	1:00 p.m. EDT	vs. Ottawa Redblacks	W 30–10	9–7	TSN/RDS/CBSSN	Molson Stadium	23,035	Recap
20	17	Sat, Oct 18	3:00 p.m. EDT	at Ottawa Redblacks	W 39–28	10–7	TSN/CTV/RDS	TD Place Stadium	20,897	Recap
21	18	Sat, Oct 25	3:00 p.m. EDT	at Winnipeg Blue Bombers	L 10–19	10–8	TSN/CTV/RDS	Princess Auto Stadium	32,343	Recap

# Games played with blue uniforms.
# Games played with white uniforms.

== Post-season ==
=== Schedule ===
Game	Date	Kickoff	Opponent	Results		TV	Venue	Attendance	Summary
Game	Date	Kickoff	Opponent	Score	Record	TV	Venue	Attendance	Summary
East Semi-Final	Sat, Nov 1	2:00 p.m. EDT	vs. Winnipeg Blue Bombers	W 42–33	1–0	TSN/CTV/RDS	Molson Stadium	19,785	Recap
East Final	Sat, Nov 8	3:00 p.m. EST	at Hamilton Tiger-Cats	W 19–16	2–0	TSN/CTV/RDS	Hamilton Stadium	25,399	Recap
112th Grey Cup	Sun, Nov 16	6:00 p.m. EST	Saskatchewan Roughriders	L 17–25	2–1	TSN/CTV/RDS	Princess Auto Stadium	32,343	Recap

# Games played with blue uniforms.
# Games played with white uniforms.

== Roster ==
2025 Montreal Alouettes final roster
**Quarterbacks**: 10 Davis Alexander; 4 McLeod Bethel-Thompson; 7 Shea Patterson; **Running backs**: 38 Jacob Mason; 8 Stevie Scott; 30 Travis Theis; **Receivers**: 3 Régis Cibasu; 15 Alexander Hollins; 81 Austin Mack; 6 Tyson Philpot; 14 Charleston Rambo; 85 Tyler Snead; 17 Cole Spieker	**Offensive linemen**: 62 Nick Callender T; 59 Cyrille Hogan-Saindon C; 54 Justin Lawrence C; 66 Pier-Olivier Lestage G; 55 Landon Rice T; 52 Tiger Shanks T; 68 Donny Ventrelli G; **Defensive linemen**: 91 Isaac Adeyemi-Berglund DE; 97 Joshua Archibald DE; 94 Mustafa Johnson DT; 90 Philippe Lemieux-Cardinal DE; 53 Kori Roberson DT; 96 Lwal Uguak DE/DT; 98 Dylan Wynn DT	**Linebackers**: 26 Tyrice Beverette; 9 Geoffrey Cantin-Arku; 34 Alexandre Gagné; 41 Riley MacLeod; 42 Tyrell Richards; 1 Darnell Sankey; **Defensive backs**: 23 Nate Beauchemin; 20 Lorenzo Burns; 35 Don Callis; 24 Marc-Antoine Dequoy; 48 Kabion Ento; 33 Arthur Hamlin; 31 Robert Kennedy; 12 Najee Murray; 37 Wes Sutton	**Special teams**: 50 Louis-Philippe Bourassa LS; 19 José Maltos K; 36 Joseph Zema P; **Practice roster**: 70 Sam Clark P; 46 K. D. Davis LB; 45 Tiyon Evans RB; 82 Kaseem Ferdinand WR; 99 Decarius Hawthorne DT; 79 Josh Hutley K/P; 65 Nouredin Nouili G; 18 E. J. Perry QB; 93 M. J. Sherman DE	**Injured list**: 32 Bubba Bolden DB; 39 David Dallaire FB; 5 Caleb Evans QB; 25 Ciante Evans DB; 67 Jesse Gibbon G; 11 Hakeem Harris WR; 60 Des Holmes T/G; 43 Scott Hutter DB; 40 Caleb Johnson LB; 0 Shawn Lemon DE; 49 Gabriel Lessard LB; 89 James Letcher Jr. WR; 61 Jamar McGloster T; 16 James Morgan QB; 83 Daniel Oladejo SB; 22 Dionté Ruffin DB; 21 Sean Thomas Erlington RB; **Suspended list**: Cameron Brown DB; Jerron Cage DT; Jarrett Horst T; Sean Ryan WR; Keanu Yazbeck RB
Italics indicate American player • **Bold** indicates Global player

== Coaching staff ==
Montreal Alouettes staff
Front office: Owner – Pierre Karl Péladeau; President & CEO – Mark Weightman; General Manager – Danny Maciocia; Assistant General Manager – Pier-Yves Lavergne; Assistant to the General Manager and Player Personnel – Marcel Desjardins; Senior Personnel Executive – Jean-Marc Edmé; Director of Player Personnel – Byron Archambault; Director of Football Operations – Allyson Sobol; Scout – Rob McIntyre; Head Video Coordinator – Rico Morotti; Head coach: Head Coach – Jason Maas; Assistant Head Coach/Special Teams Coordinator – Byron Archambault; Offensive coaches: Offensive Coordinator & Quarterbacks – Anthony Calvillo; Offensive Line – Luc Brodeur-Jourdain; Receivers & Pass Game Coordinator – Michael Lionello; Running Backs – Dave Jackson; Assistant Offensive Line – David Brown	Defensive coaches: Defensive Coordinator & Defensive Backs – Noel Thorpe; Linebackers – Greg Quick; Defensive Line – Corvey Irvin; Staff: Equipment Manager – Dominic Manno; Equipment Manager – David Deschamps; Head Athletic Therapist – Tristan Castonguay; Assistant Athletic Therapist - Dillon Warren; → Coaching staff
