= Shedler Fervius =

Canadian gridiron football player (born 1999)

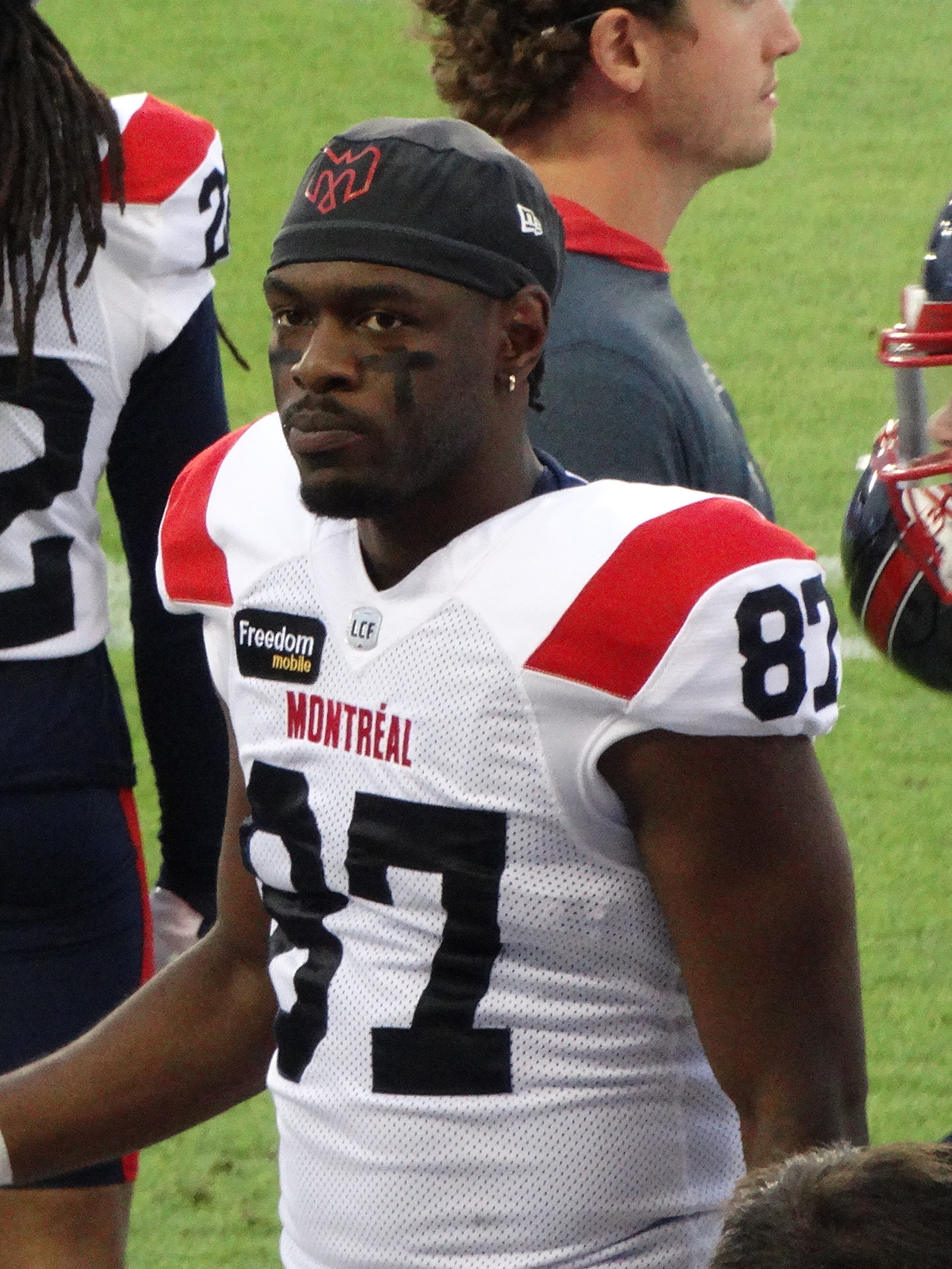
- Fervius with the Montreal Alouettes in 2024

No. 83
- Position: Wide receiver

Personal information
- Born: March 6, 1999 (age 27); Toronto, Ontario, Canada
- Listed height: 6 ft 1 in (1.85 m)
- Listed weight: 190 lb (86 kg)

Career information
- University: Saint Mary's
- CFL draft: 2023: 5th round, 41st overall pick

Career history
- Montreal Alouettes (2023–2025); Hamilton Tiger-Cats (2025)

Awards and highlights
- Grey Cup champion (2023)
- Stats at CFL.ca

Shedler Fervius (born March 6, 1999) is a Canadian professional football wide receiver.

== University career ==
Fervius played U Sports football for the Saint Mary's Huskies from 2018 to 2021. He did not play in 2020 due to the cancelled 2020 U Sports football season, but he played in 18 games where he had 59 receptions for 702 yards and one touchdown. He did not play in 2023 after he was deemed academically ineligible.

== Professional career ==
=== Montreal Alouettes ===
Fervius was drafted in the fifth round, 41st overall, by the Montreal Alouettes in the 2023 CFL draft and signed with the team on May 11, 2023. Following training camp in 2023, he was placed on the team's practice roster. However, he made his professional debut on September 30, 2023, against the Ottawa Redblacks. He played in four regular season games, starting in one, but did not record any receptions and had one special teams tackle. He also played in both playoff games that year as the team advanced to the 110th Grey Cup.

In 2024, Fervius played in 12 regular season games where he recorded seven receptions for 87 yards. He played in the first three games of the 2025 season, but was released on June 23, 2025.

=== Hamilton Tiger-Cats ===
On August 30, 2025, it was announced that Fervius had signed with the Hamilton Tiger-Cats. He spent the rest of the season on the practice roster and his contract expired on November 9, 2025. He re-signed with the Tiger-Cats on December 18, 2025.

On May 19, 2026, Fervius was released by the Tiger-Cats.
