= 2023 Montreal Alouettes season =

CFL team season

- General manager: Danny Maciocia
- President: Mark Weightman
- Head coach: Jason Maas
- Home stadium: Percival Molson Memorial Stadium

Results
- Record: 11–7
- Division place: 2nd, East
- Playoffs: Won Grey Cup
- Team MOP: Austin Mack
- Team MODP: Tyrice Beverette
- Team MOC: Marc-Antoine Dequoy
- Team MOOL: Pier-Olivier Lestage
- Team MOST: Joseph Zema
- Team MOR: Reggie Stubblefield

Uniform
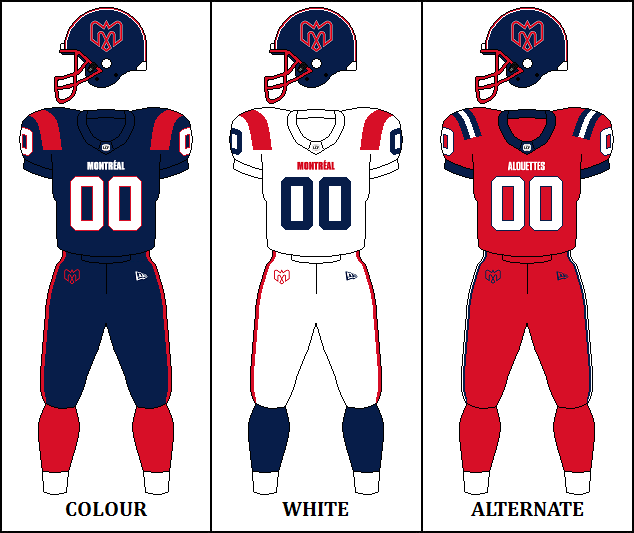

The 2023 Montreal Alouettes season was the 56th season for the team in the Canadian Football League (CFL) and their 68th overall. The Alouettes qualified for the playoffs for the fourth consecutive season following their week 17 win over the Ottawa Redblacks. The team defeated the Winnipeg Blue Bombers to win their eighth Grey Cup championship.

The 2023 CFL season was the third season with Danny Maciocia as the team's general manager, and the first season with a new head coach after both Maciocia and the team's president, Mario Cecchini, stated that a new coach would be hired following Maciocia's interim appointment in the position in 2022. On December 8, 2022, the Alouettes had announced that the five candidates that were interviewed were Byron Archambault, André Bolduc, Anthony Calvillo, Jason Maas, and Noel Thorpe. On December 17, 2022, it was announced that Maas had been named the 27th head coach in franchise history.

== Offseason ==
=== CFL global draft ===
The 2023 CFL global draft took place on May 2, 2023. The Alouettes had the fifth selection in each round.

Round	Pick	Player	Position	Club/School	Hometown
1	5	Simon Lars Sandberg	DL	Oregon State	Sweden
2	14	Rhys Byrns	P	Louisiana-Lafayette	Australia

== CFL national draft ==
The 2023 CFL draft took place on May 2, 2023. The Alouettes had eight selections in the eight-round draft, but acquired an additional first-round pick from the BC Lions following the Vernon Adams trade. The team traded their third-round selection to the Edmonton Elks in the trade for Nafees Lyon and Thomas Costigan.

The Alouettes had the fifth selection in each of the eight rounds of the draft after losing the East Semi-Final and finishing fifth in the 2022 league standings, not including traded picks.

Round	Pick	Player	Position	School	Hometown
1	5	Jonathan Sutherland	LB	Penn State	Ottawa, ON
1	7	Lwal Uguak	DL	Texas Christian	Edmonton, AB
2	13	David Dallaire	FB	Laval	Saint-Georges, QC
4	32	Theo Grant	OL	Queen's	Halifax, NS
5	39	Jacob Mason	FB	McMaster	Burlington, ON
5	41	Shedler Fervius	WR	St. Mary's	Toronto, ON
7	59	Chase Brown	RB	Illinois	London, ON
8	68	Maxym Lavallee	DB	Laval	Gatineau, QC

== Preseason ==
=== Schedule ===
Week	Game	Date	Kickoff	Opponent	Results		TV	Venue	Attendance	Summary
Week	Game	Date	Kickoff	Opponent	Score	Record	TV	Venue	Attendance	Summary
A	Bye									
B	1	Fri, May 26	7:30 p.m. EDT	at Ottawa Redblacks	W 22–21	1–0	TSN/RDS	TD Place Stadium	15,802	Recap
C	2	Fri, June 2	7:30 p.m. EDT	vs. Hamilton Tiger-Cats	W 25–22	2–0	RDS	Molson Stadium	12,698	Recap

# Games played with blue uniforms.

== Regular season ==
=== Standings ===
East Division
Team	GP	W	L	T	Pts	PF	PA	Div	Stk	
Toronto Argonauts	18	16	2	0	32	591	396	10–0	W4	Details
Montreal Alouettes	18	11	7	0	22	442	392	7–3	W5	Details
Hamilton Tiger-Cats	18	8	10	0	16	408	461	3–7	L2	Details
Ottawa Redblacks	18	4	14	0	8	415	507	0–10	L4	Details

=== Schedule ===
Week	Game	Date	Kickoff	Opponent	Results		TV	Venue	Attendance	Summary
Week	Game	Date	Kickoff	Opponent	Score	Record	TV	Venue	Attendance	Summary
1	1	Sat, June 10	7:00 p.m. EDT	vs. Ottawa Redblacks	W 19–12	1–0	TSN/RDS/CBSSN	Molson Stadium	20,865	Recap
2	Bye									
3	2	Fri, June 23	7:30 p.m. EDT	at Hamilton Tiger-Cats	W 38–12	2–0	TSN/RDS/CBSSN	Tim Hortons Field	23,180	Recap
4	3	Sat, July 1	7:00 p.m. EDT	vs. Winnipeg Blue Bombers	L 3–17	2–1	TSN/RDS/CBSSN	Molson Stadium	15,088	Recap
5	4	Sun, July 9	7:00 p.m. EDT	at BC Lions	L 19–35	2–2	TSN/RDS/CBSSN	BC Place	20,106	Recap
6	5	Fri, July 14	7:30 p.m. EDT	vs. Toronto Argonauts	L 27–35	2–3	TSN/RDS	Molson Stadium	16,151	Recap
7	Bye									
8	6	Sun, Jul 30	7:00 p.m. EDT	vs. Calgary Stampeders	W 25–18	3–3	TSN/RDS	Molson Stadium	18,098	Recap
9	7	Sat, Aug 5	7:00 p.m. EDT	at Hamilton Tiger-Cats	W 27–14	4–3	TSN/RDS/CBSSN	Tim Hortons Field	21,467	Recap
10	8	Fri, Aug 11	7:30 p.m. EDT	vs. Saskatchewan Roughriders	W 41–12	5–3	TSN/RDS	Molson Stadium	17,027	Recap
11	9	Sat, Aug 19	7:00 p.m. EDT	at Ottawa Redblacks	W 25–24	6–3	TSN/RDS/CBSSN	TD Place Stadium	19,475	Recap
12	10	Thu, Aug 24	8:30 p.m. EDT	at Winnipeg Blue Bombers	L 17–47	6–4	TSN/RDS/CBSSN	IG Field	32,343	Recap
13	11	Sat, Sept 2	7:00 p.m. EDT	vs. BC Lions	L 25–34	6–5	TSN/RDS	Molson Stadium	17,112	Recap
14	12	Sat, Sept 9	1:00 p.m. EDT	at Toronto Argonauts	L 10–39	6–6	TSN/RDS	BMO Field	14,415	Recap
15	13	Fri, Sept 15	7:00 p.m. EDT	vs. Toronto Argonauts	L 20–23	6–7	TSN/RDS	Molson Stadium	17,626	Recap
16	14	Sat, Sept 23	4:00 p.m. EDT	at Calgary Stampeders	W 28–11	7–7	TSN/RDS	McMahon Stadium	22,321	Recap
17	15	Sat, Sept 30	4:00 p.m. EDT	at Ottawa Redblacks	W 32–15	8–7	TSN/RDS	TD Place Stadium	20,464	Recap
18	16	Mon, Oct 9	1:00 p.m. EDT	vs. Ottawa Redblacks	W 29–3	9–7	TSN/RDS/CBSSN	Molson Stadium	20,664	Recap
19	17	Sat, Oct 14	4:00 p.m. EDT	at Edmonton Elks	W 35–21	10–7	TSN/RDS	Commonwealth Stadium	22,822	Recap
20	Bye									
21	18	Sat, Oct 28	4:00 p.m. EDT	vs. Hamilton Tiger-Cats	W 22–20	11–7	TSN/RDS	Molson Stadium	16,402	Recap

# Games played with blue uniforms.
# Games played with white uniforms.
# Games played with red uniforms.

== Post-season ==
=== Schedule ===
Game	Date	Kickoff	Opponent	Results		TV	Venue	Attendance	Summary
Game	Date	Kickoff	Opponent	Score	Record	TV	Venue	Attendance	Summary
East Semi-Final	Sat, Nov 4	3:00 p.m. EDT	vs. Hamilton Tiger-Cats	W 27–12	1–0	TSN/RDS	Molson Stadium	20,127	Recap
East Final	Sat, Nov 11	3:00 p.m. EST	at Toronto Argonauts	W 38–17	2–0	TSN/RDS	BMO Field	26,620	Recap
110th Grey Cup	Sun, Nov 19	6:00 p.m. EST	Winnipeg Blue Bombers	W 28–24	3–0	TSN/RDS	Tim Hortons Field	28,808	Recap

# Games played with blue uniforms.
# Games played with red uniforms.

== Roster ==
2023 Montreal Alouettes final roster
**Quarterbacks**: 3 Davis Alexander; 5 Caleb Evans; 7 Cody Fajardo; **Running backs**: 20 Jeshrun Antwi; 39 David Dallaire; 31 William Stanback; 40 James Tuck; **Receivers**: 83 Régis Cibasu; 87 Shedler Fervius; 19 Jake Harty; 89 James Letcher Jr.; 81 Austin Mack; 6 Tyson Philpot; 85 Tyler Snead; 17 Cole Spieker	**Offensive linemen**: 62 Nick Callender T; 53 Philippe Gagnon G; 64 Sean Jamieson; 54 Justin Lawrence C; 51 Kristian Matte G; 61 Jamar McGloster T; 55 Landon Rice T; **Defensive linemen**: 91 Vincent Desjardins DT; 23 Avery Ellis DE; 98 Brock Gowanlock DE; 94 Mustafa Johnson DT; 0 Shawn Lemon DE; 90 Almondo Sewell DT; 96 Lwal Uguak DE	**Linebackers**: 26 Tyrice Beverette; 49 Frédéric Chagnon; 34 Alexandre Gagné; 42 Tyrell Richards; 1 Darnell Sankey; 2 Avery Williams; **Defensive backs**: 24 Marc-Antoine Dequoy; 48 Kabion Ento; 4 Ciante Evans; 47 Dishon McNary; 22 Dionté Ruffin; 35 Reggie Stubblefield; 37 Wes Sutton	**Special teams**: 50 Louis-Philippe Bourassa LS; 15 David Côté K; 36 Joseph Zema P; **Practice roster**: 70 Rhys Burns P; 65 Joshua Donovan T; 45 Kenneth Durden DB; 88 Kevin Kaya SB; 72 José Maltos K; 41 Myles Manalo LB; 38 Jacob Mason FB; 46 Chris Moore LB; **Suspended list**: Yanis Chihat LB; Jumal Rolle DB; Jermaine Wynn Jr. WR	**Injured list**: 80 Keshunn Abram SB; 95 Israel Antwine DT; 66 David Brown C/T; 32 Tysen-Otis Copeland DB; 14 Quartney Davis WR; 82 Greg Ellingson SB; 25 Walter Fletcher RB; 67 Jesse Gibbon G; 11 Kaion Julien-Grant SB; 68 Pier-Olivier Lestage G; 18 Zach Lindley DB; 8 Nafees Lyon DB; 97 T. D. Moultry DE; 12 Najee Murray DB; 44 Bryce Notree LB; 29 J. R. Reed DB; 33 Kordell Rodgers DB; 93 Marcus Valdez DT; 84 Reggie White Jr. SB; 21 Raheem Wilson DB; 30 Chandler Worthy WR
Italics indicate American player • **Bold** indicates Global player

== Coaching staff ==
Montreal Alouettes staff
Front office: Owner – Pierre Karl Péladeau; President & CEO – Mark Weightman; General Manager – Danny Maciocia; Senior Director of Football Operations – Éric Deslauriers; Director of Pro Personnel – Jean-Marc Edmé; Director of National Scouting – Pier-Yves Lavergne; Director of Player Personnel – Byron Archambault; Manager of Football Operations – Allyson Sobol; Head Video Coordinator – Rico Morotti; Head coach: Head Coach – Jason Maas; Assistant Head Coach – Byron Archambault; Offensive coaches: Offensive Coordinator & Quarterbacks – Anthony Calvillo; Offensive Line – Luc Brodeur-Jourdain; Receivers & Pass Game Coordinator – Michael Lionello; Running Backs – Tyrell Sutton	Defensive coaches: Defensive Coordinator & Defensive Backs – Noel Thorpe; Linebackers – Greg Quick; Defensive Line – Corvey Irvin; Assistant Defensive Backs – Chandler Jones; Special teams coaches: Special Teams Coordinator – Byron Archambault; Special Teams Assistant – Dave Jackson; Staff: Equipment Manager – Dominic Manno; Equipment Manager – David Deschamps; Head Athletic Therapist – Tristan Castonguay; Assistant Athletic Therapist - Dillon Warren; → Coaching staff
