= Reggie White Jr. =

American gridiron football player (born 1996)

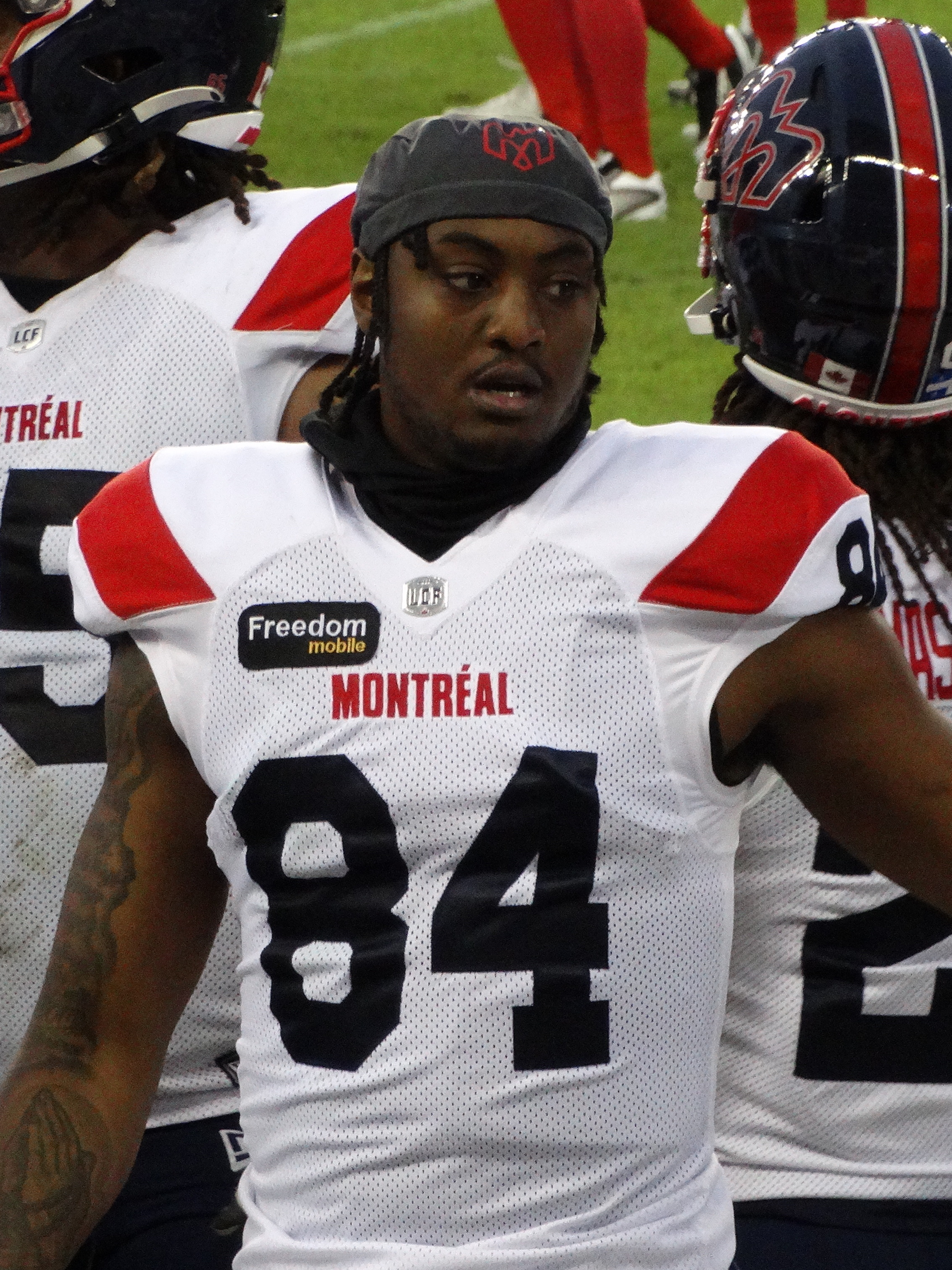
- White Jr. with the Montreal Alouettes in 2024

Profile
- Position: Wide receiver

Personal information
- Born: March 10, 1996 (age 30); Randallstown, Maryland, U.S.
- Listed height: 6 ft 3 in (1.91 m)
- Listed weight: 210 lb (95 kg)

Career information
- High school: Milford Mill Academy
- College: Monmouth

Career history
- 2019–2020: New York Giants*
- 2021–2024: Montreal Alouettes
- 2025: Winnipeg Blue Bombers*
- * Offseason or practice squad member only

Awards and highlights
- Grey Cup champion (2023)

Career CFL statistics
- Games played: 32
- Receptions: 142
- Receiving yards: 1,254
- Receiving touchdowns: 8
- Stats at Pro Football Reference
- Stats at CFL.ca

Reginald Eugene White Jr. (born March 10, 1996) is an American professional football wide receiver. He was most recently a member of the Winnipeg Blue Bombers of the Canadian Football League (CFL). He played college football at Monmouth, where he holds the school's record for receiving yards.

== University career ==
After using a redshirt season in 2014, White Jr. played college football for the Monmouth Hawks from 2015 to 2018.

== Professional career ==
=== New York Giants ===
After not being selected in the 2019 NFL draft, White Jr. signed with the New York Giants as an undrafted free agent. He spent the 2019 season on the team's practice roster and was released during the following offseason in May 2020.

=== Montreal Alouettes ===
On January 22, 2021, it was announced that White Jr. had signed with the Montreal Alouettes. White Jr. made his professional regular season debut on October 22, 2021, where he had two catches for 26 yards. He played in five games in 2021 season, finishing with 18 receptions for 177 yards and two touchdowns. He also made his postseason debut in the East Semi-Final where he had four catches for 39 yards in the loss to the Hamilton Tiger-Cats.

In 2022, White had a breakout year where he played and started in the first 15 games of the regular season, recording 53 catches for 722 yards and two touchdowns. However, his season came to an end on October 10, 2022, in the Thanksgiving Day Classic against the Ottawa Redblacks where he tore three ligaments in his knee after being pushed out of bounds by Damon Webb. With a recovery time of nine to 12 months, White sat out the entire 2023 season. While he was medically cleared to play at the end of 2023, he was not fully recovered and was on the injured list when the Alouettes won the 110th Grey Cup.

Upon returning healthy to the Alouettes in 2024, White suffered a rib injury and was added to the six-game injured list to start the season. However, following a quick recovery, White made his season debut on June 20, 2024, against the Ottawa Redblacks where he had four receptions for 61 yards and two touchdowns. He played in 12 regular season games where he had 24 receptions for 355 yards and four touchdowns. He became a free agent upon the expiry of his contract on February 11, 2025.

=== Winnipeg Blue Bombers ===
On February 11, 2025, White signed a one-year contract with the Winnipeg Blue Bombers. He began the year on the practice roster and was released on June 16, 2025, without having played in a game for the Blue Bombers.

== Personal life ==
White Jr. was born to parents Reggie and Nicole White. White Sr. played for five years in the National Football League (NFL) as a defensive lineman. White has one son who was born in October 2022.
