= Marcus Valdez =

American gridiron football player (born 1999)

No. 93
- Position: Defensive lineman

Personal information
- Born: February 19, 1999 (age 27); Perth Amboy, New Jersey, U.S.
- Listed height: 6 ft 0 in (1.83 m)
- Listed weight: 256 lb (116 kg)

Career information
- High school: Don Bosco Prep (Ramsey, New Jersey)
- College: Boston College
- NFL draft: 2023: undrafted

Career history
- 2023: Montreal Alouettes

Awards and highlights
- Grey Cup champion (2023)
- Stats at CFL.ca

Marcus Joseph Valdez (born February 19, 1999) is an American former professional football defensive lineman who played for the Montreal Alouettes of the Canadian Football League (CFL). He played college football at Boston College.

== Early life ==
Marcus Joseph Valdez was born on February 19, 1999, in Perth Amboy, New Jersey. He played high school football at Don Bosco Preparatory High School in Ramsey, New Jersey as a defensive end, defensive tackle, and tight end. He missed the majority of his senior year due to an injury. Valdez also participated in track and field in high school.

== College career ==
Valdez played college football at Boston College from 2018 to 2022. He was redshirted in 2017.

Valdez played in 12 games in 2018 and made 13 tackles. He appeared in 13 games, starting one, in 2019, totaling 26 tackles, 2.5 sacks, one forced fumble and two fumble recoveries. He started 11 games in 2020, accumulating 37 tackles, two sacks and two fumble recoveries while serving as a team captain. After missing the first three games of the 2021 season due to a hand injury, Valdez played in nine games, starting eight, in 2021, recording 28 tackles, five sacks, three forced fumbles and one fumble recovery while serving as a team captain for the second year in a row. He earned honorable mention All-Atlantic Coast Conference (ACC) honors in 2021. He appeared in 12 games in 2022, totaling 30 tackles, four sacks, one forced fumble and one fumble recovery.

== Professional career ==
Valdez was signed to the practice roster of the Montreal Alouettes of the Canadian Football League (CFL) on July 24, 2023. He was promoted to the active roster on August 9 and dressed in one game for the Alouettes but did not record any statistics. He was placed on injured reserve on November 18, 2023. On November 19, 2023, the Alouettes won the 110th Grey Cup, defeating the Winnipeg Blue Bombers by a score of 28–24. Valdez was released on April 18, 2024.
