= Byron Archambault =

Canadian gridiron football coach (born 1990)

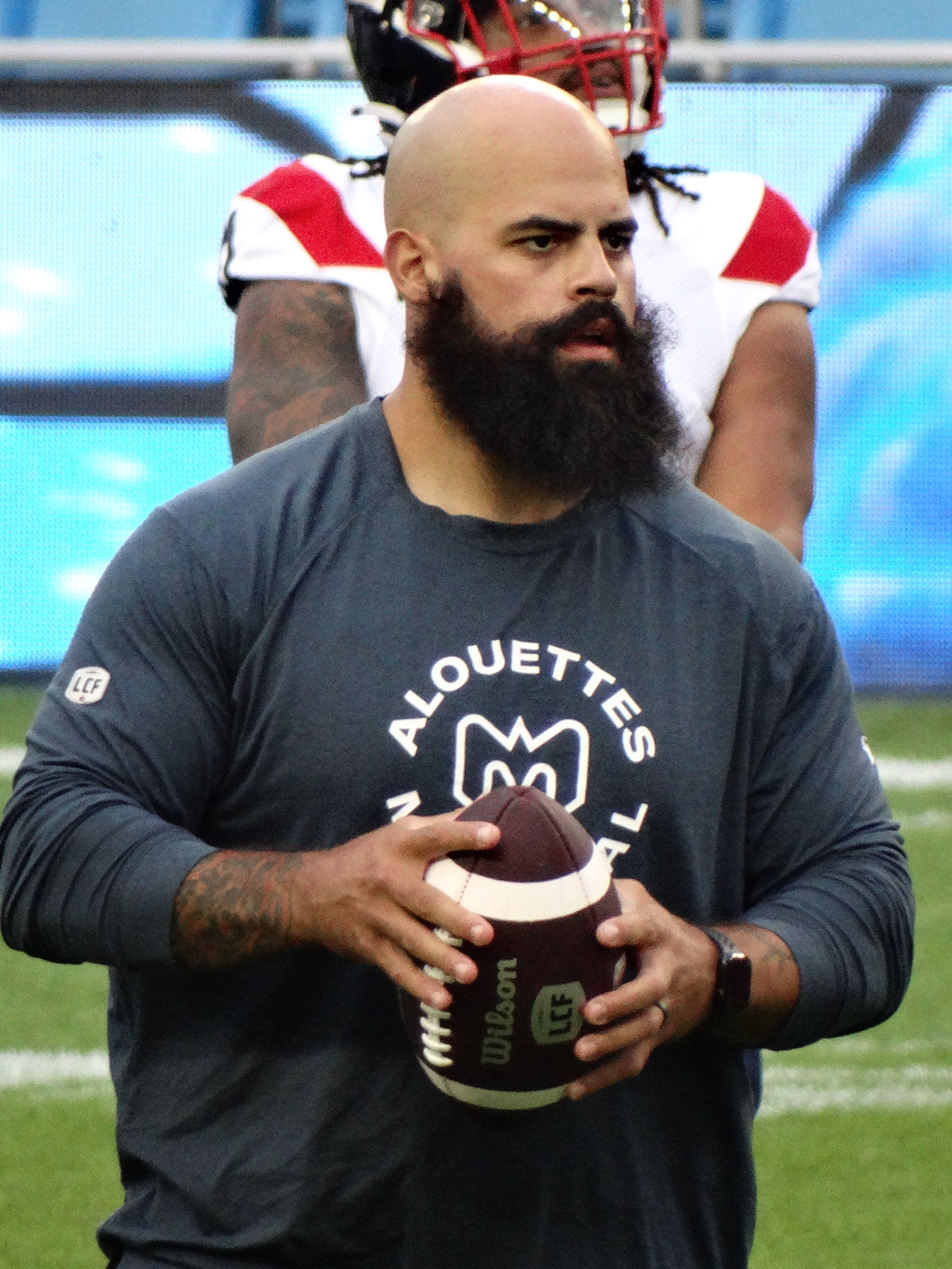
- Archambault with the Montreal Alouettes in 2024

Montreal Alouettes
- Title: Special teams coordinator, linebackers coach, director of player personnel

Personal information
- Born: October 18, 1990 (age 36); Montreal, Quebec, Canada
- Listed height: 6 ft 0 in (1.83 m)
- Listed weight: 236 lb (107 kg)

Career information
- Position: Linebacker
- University: Montreal
- CFL draft: 2015: 2nd round, 17th overall pick

Career history

Playing
- 2015–2016: Hamilton Tiger-Cats

Coaching
- 2017–2019: Montreal Carabins (Special teams coordinator / linebackers coach)
- 2021: Montreal Alouettes (Defensive assistant)
- 2022–present: Montreal Alouettes (Special teams coordinator / linebackers coach)

Operations
- 2020: Montreal Alouettes (Director of national scouting)
- 2021–present: Montreal Alouettes (Director of player personnel)

Awards and highlights
- Grey Cup champion (2023); Vanier Cup champion (2014); First-team All-Canadian (2014)
- Stats at CFL.ca

Byron Archambault (born October 18, 1990) is a former professional gridiron football linebacker and is currently the special teams coordinator, linebackers coach, and director of player personnel for the Montreal Alouettes of the Canadian Football League (CFL).

== University career ==
After initially committing to play for the Western Mustangs, a break-in at his family home convinced him to play CIS football in his hometown with the Montreal Carabins for head coach Danny Maciocia. He played for the Carabins from 2011 to 2014 where he was named a CIS First Team All-Canadian and the RSEQ Defensive Player of the Year in 2014. In the 50th Vanier Cup game, played in Montreal in 2014, Archambault recorded three solo tackles, one assisted tackle, and one fumble recovery in the Carabins' 20–19 victory over the McMaster Marauders, which was the first national championship in program history.

== Professional career ==
Archambault was drafted in the second round, 17th overall, in the 2015 CFL draft by the Hamilton Tiger-Cats and signed with the team on May 26, 2015. He made the team following training camp and made his professional debut on June 26, 2015, against the Calgary Stampeders. He played in the team's first nine games until he tore his ACL while running downfield on a kickoff in a game against the Montreal Alouettes on August 27, 2015. He returned to his hometown, Montreal, for rehabilitation and returned to play almost exactly one year later on August 28, 2016, where he had one special teams tackle against the Stampeders. However, he became injured again and was transferred to the six-game injured list on September 1, 2016, where he finished the 2016 season. He retired from the CFL in the following off-season and formally submitted his retirement documentation on April 10, 2017.

== Coaching and football operations career ==
=== Montreal Carabins ===
After informing the Tiger-Cats that he would not return to playing, Archambault joined the Montreal Carabins as the team's special teams coordinator and linebackers coach for the 2017 season. In his third season as a coach with the team, the Carabins won the Dunsmore Cup and played in the 55th Vanier Cup, but lost the championship to the Calgary Dinos.

=== Montreal Alouettes ===
After the Carabins former head coach, Danny Maciocia, was hired by the Montreal Alouettes to become the team's general manager, Archambault was hired as the Alouettes' director of national scouting on February 13, 2020. The 2020 CFL season was cancelled and he became the team's director of player personnel in 2021. Midway through the 2021 season, Archambault joined the team's coaching staff as a defensive assistant coach on September 28, 2021, following the dismissal of defensive line coach, Todd Howard. For the 2022 season, he was promoted to linebackers coach. Just one week prior to the opening of 2022 training camp, he received another job title as he was named the team's special teams coordinator following the departure of Jeff Reinebold. In early December 2022 it was reported that Archambault was one of five finalists for the vacant Alouettes head coaching job. However, he remained in his position for the 2023 season after Jason Maas was hired as head coach. Thereafter, he won his first Grey Cup as the Alouettes defeated the Winnipeg Blue Bombers in the 110th Grey Cup.
