= Kordell Rodgers =

American gridiron football player (born 1998)

No. 33, 25
- Position: Defensive back

Personal information
- Born: September 10, 1998 (age 28); Lufkin, Texas, U.S.
- Listed height: 5 ft 11 in (1.80 m)
- Listed weight: 175 lb (79 kg)

Career information
- High school: Lufkin
- College: Texas State (2017–2022)
- NFL draft: 2023: undrafted

Career history
- 2023: Montreal Alouettes
- 2024: Hamilton Tiger-Cats

Awards and highlights
- Grey Cup champion (2023)
- Stats at CFL.ca

Kordell Rodgers (born September 10, 1998) is an American former professional football defensive back who played in the Canadian Football League (CFL) with the Montreal Alouettes and Hamilton Tiger-Cats. He played college football at Texas State.

== Early life ==
Rodgers played high school football at Lufkin High School in Lufkin, Texas as a quarterback. He threw for 2,142 yards and 23 touchdowns his junior season, and 3,231 yards and 32 touchdowns his senior season, earning District 12-6A Offensive MVP honors both years. He was also named honorable mention all-state his senior year. Rodgers also played basketball in high school.

== College career ==
Rodgers played college football at Texas State from 2017 to 2022, spending time at both cornerback and safety.

== Professional career ==
Rodgers signed with the Montreal Alouettes of the Canadian Football League (CFL) on May 10, 2023, after going undrafted in the 2023 NFL draft. He was moved between the practice roster, active roster and injured reserve several times during the 2023 season. Overall, he dressed in 12 games, starting 11, in 2023, recording 35 tackles on defense and two interceptions. On November 19, 2023, the Alouettes won the 110th Grey Cup, defeating the Winnipeg Blue Bombers by a score of 28–24. He was released near the start of training camp in the following season on May 15, 2024.

On June 19, 2024, it was announced that Rodgers had signed with the Hamilton Tiger-Cats. He started one game for the Tiger-Cats, posting three defensive tackles, before being released in August 2024.
