= Jacob Mason =

Canadian gridiron football player (born 2000)

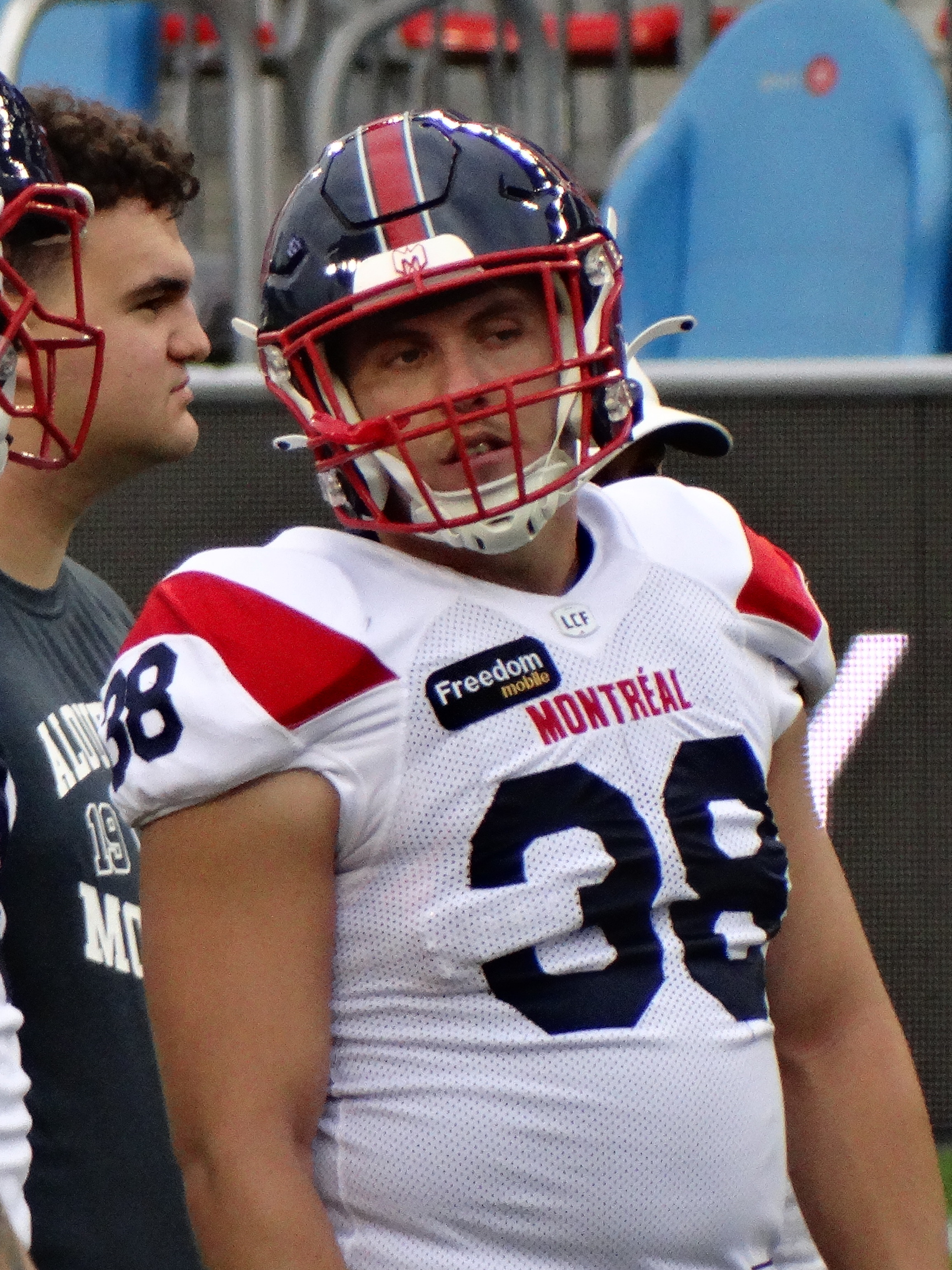
- Mason with the Montreal Alouettes in 2024

No. 38 – Montreal Alouettes
- Position: Fullback
- Roster status: Active
- CFL status: National

Personal information
- Born: June 13, 2000 (age 26); Burlington, Ontario, Canada
- Listed height: 6 ft 0 in (1.83 m)
- Listed weight: 252 lb (114 kg)

Career information
- University: McMaster
- CFL draft: 2023: 5th round, 39th overall pick

Career history
- Montreal Alouettes (2023–present)

Awards and highlights
- Grey Cup champion (2023); CFL West All-Star (2026)
- Stats at CFL.ca

Jacob Mason (born June 13, 2000) is a Canadian professional football fullback for the Montreal Alouettes of the Canadian Football League (CFL).

== University career ==
Mason played U Sports football for the McMaster Marauders from 2018 to 2023. He used a redshirt season in 2019 and did not play in 2020 due to the cancellation of the 2020 U Sports football season.

== Professional career ==
Pre-draft measurables
| Height | Weight | 40-yard dash | 20-yard shuttle | Three-cone drill | Vertical jump | Broad jump | Bench press |
|---|---|---|---|---|---|---|---|
| 6 ft 0 in (1.83 m) | 222 lb (101 kg) | 4.93 s | 4.62 s | 7.40 s | 29.0 in (0.74 m) | 8 ft 7 7/8 in (2.64 m) | 15 reps |
All values from CFL Combine

Mason was drafted in the fifth round, 39th overall, by the Montreal Alouettes in the 2023 CFL draft and signed with the team on May 11, 2023. Following 2023 training camp, he returned to McMaster to complete his university eligibility. He then returned to the Alouettes later that season when he re-signed on October 5, 2023. Mason finished the season on the practice roster as the Alouettes won the 110th Grey Cup. He then re-signed with the team on November 27, 2023.

In 2024, Mason made the opening day roster and made his professional debut on June 7, 2024, against the Winnipeg Blue Bombers.
