= Reggie White (defensive lineman, born 1970) =

American football player (born 1970)

No. 90
- Position: Defensive tackle

Personal information
- Born: March 22, 1970 (age 56); Baltimore, Maryland, U.S.
- Listed height: 6 ft 4 in (1.93 m)
- Listed weight: 296 lb (134 kg)

Career information
- High school: Milford Mill (Baltimore)
- College: North Carolina A&T
- NFL draft: 1992: 6th round, 147th overall pick

Career history
- San Diego Chargers (1992–1994); New England Patriots (1995); New York Jets (1997)*
- * Offseason or practice squad member only

Career NFL statistics
- Tackles: 44
- Sacks: 4.5
- Forced fumbles: 6
- Stats at Pro Football Reference

Reginald Eugene White (born March 22, 1970) is an American former professional football player who was a defensive tackle for four seasons in the National Football League (NFL) with the San Diego Chargers and New England Patriots. He was selected by the Chargers in the sixth round of the 1992 NFL draft. He played college football for the North Carolina A&T Aggies.

== Early life ==
White played high school football for the Milford Mill Academy Millers of Milford Mill, Maryland, helping the team win the state Class C championship in 1987.

== Professional career ==
White was selected by the San Diego Chargers in the sixth round with the 147th pick in the 1992 NFL draft. He played in 22 games for the Chargers from 1992 to 1994. He played in sixteen games, starting seven, for the New England Patriots during the 1995 season.

== Coaching career ==
White later became head coach of the Milford Mill Academy Millers.

== Personal life ==
White's son Reggie White Jr. played in the Canadian Football League and played college football for the Monmouth Hawks. White's son Nicholas plays at Milford Mill Academy. White is married to Nicole.
