= Tysen-Otis Copeland =

Canadian football player (born 1997)

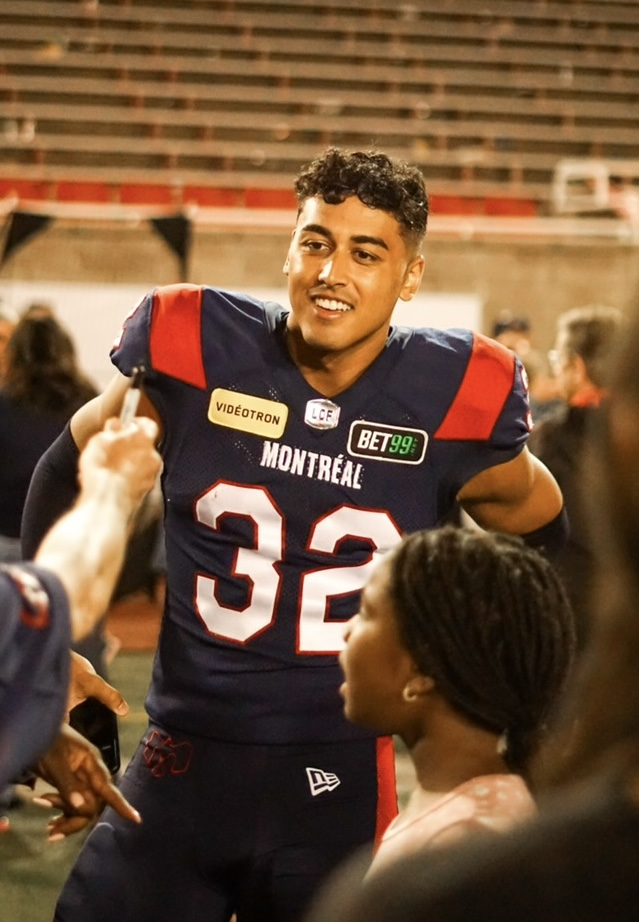
- Copeland with the Montreal Alouettes in 2023

Profile
- Position: Defensive back

Personal information
- Born: August 24, 1997 (age 29); Montreal, Quebec, Canada
- Listed height: 6 ft 1 in (1.85 m)
- Listed weight: 203 lb (92 kg)

Career information
- University: Montreal
- CFL draft: 2022: 4th round, 33rd overall pick

Career history
- 2022–2024: Montreal Alouettes
- 2025: Ottawa Redblacks

Awards and highlights
- Grey Cup champion (2023); East Division champion (2023); Dunsmore Cup champion (2019, 2021); Uteck Bowl champion (2019)
- Stats at CFL.ca

Tysen-Otis Copeland (born August 24, 1997) is a Canadian professional football defensive back, Grey Cup champion, and electrical engineering student. He is currently a free agent and has previously played for the Montreal Alouettes and Ottawa Redblacks of the Canadian Football League (CFL). Copeland played U Sports football for the Montreal Carabins, where he won two Dunsmore Cup championships and a Uteck Bowl. He was selected in the fourth round (33rd overall) of the 2022 CFL draft by the Montreal Alouettes.

== Early life ==
Copeland was born and raised in the West Island area of Montreal, Quebec, where he began playing football at a young age. He first joined the Sunnybrooke program, playing there for six years under the guidance of his father, who coached him during his early development.

He later played bantam football with the Île-Perrot Patriotes before joining the Intrépides du Chêne-Bleu, where he became the first player from the program to be drafted into the CFL.

Before moving on to university football, Copeland played for the John Abbott College Islanders, where he continued to develop as a defensive back. Throughout his youth, he credited each organization he played for—from Sunnybrooke to the Carabins—for shaping his work ethic and competitiveness. In the offseason, he also played flag football to maintain his conditioning and sharpen his instincts.

== University career ==
Before joining the Carabins, Copeland played college football for the John Abbott College Islanders from 2015 to 2017, where he developed as a standout defensive back and attracted attention from university scouts. During his time at John Abbott, he studied and graduated from the Engineering Technologies program.

Copeland went on to play three seasons of U Sports football with the Montreal Carabins while studying electrical engineering at the Université de Montréal. During his time with the Carabins, he established himself as a versatile defensive back and helped the team capture multiple championships. He won two Dunsmore Cup titles in 2019 and 2021, and a Uteck Bowl championship in 2019.

Copeland’s 2022 draft year was impacted by a partial ACL tear that limited his playtime, though he was still recognized among the top defensive back prospects in Quebec. Despite the setback, he finished his collegiate career with consistent performances in coverage and run defense, contributing to the Carabins’ continued success in the RSEQ conference.

== Professional career ==
In the 2022 CFL draft, Copeland was selected in the fourth round as the 33rd overall pick by the Montreal Alouettes. This selection made him the first player from his high school to be drafted in the CFL. He did not appear in any games as a rookie.

Copeland was put on the practice roster to start the 2023 season, but made his professional debut in week 9, on August 5, 2023, against the Hamilton Tiger-Cats. He played in nine games in 2023 where he had six special teams tackles and one fumble recovery. He also played in the East Semi-Final and East Final that year, but was on the injured list when the Alouettes won the 110th Grey Cup.

In 2024, Copeland played in just two regular season games before suffering a torn abdominal muscle that caused him to miss the remainder of the season. He was placed on the six-game injured list and was later released in the following offseason on February 20, 2025.

On August 18, 2025, Copeland signed with the Ottawa Redblacks. He was later released by the team and is currently a free agent.

== Personal life ==
Copeland was born and raised in Pincourt, Quebec, where his passion for football began at the age of six. Inspired by his older brother, Keenan Copeland, he chose to pursue football over soccer and quickly became known for his work ethic and athleticism. His father, Tony Copeland, coached him through his early years, while his mother, Marie Guenette, has remained a constant source of support throughout his career.

Known for his discipline and dedication, Copeland trains hard year-round and focuses on maintaining peak athletic shape by staying consistent and eating well. His determination and preparation have been key factors in his development as a professional athlete.

Outside of football, Copeland continues to study electrical engineering and takes pride in representing his hometown while inspiring younger athletes to pursue their goals.
