= David Dallaire =

Canadian gridiron football player (born 1999)

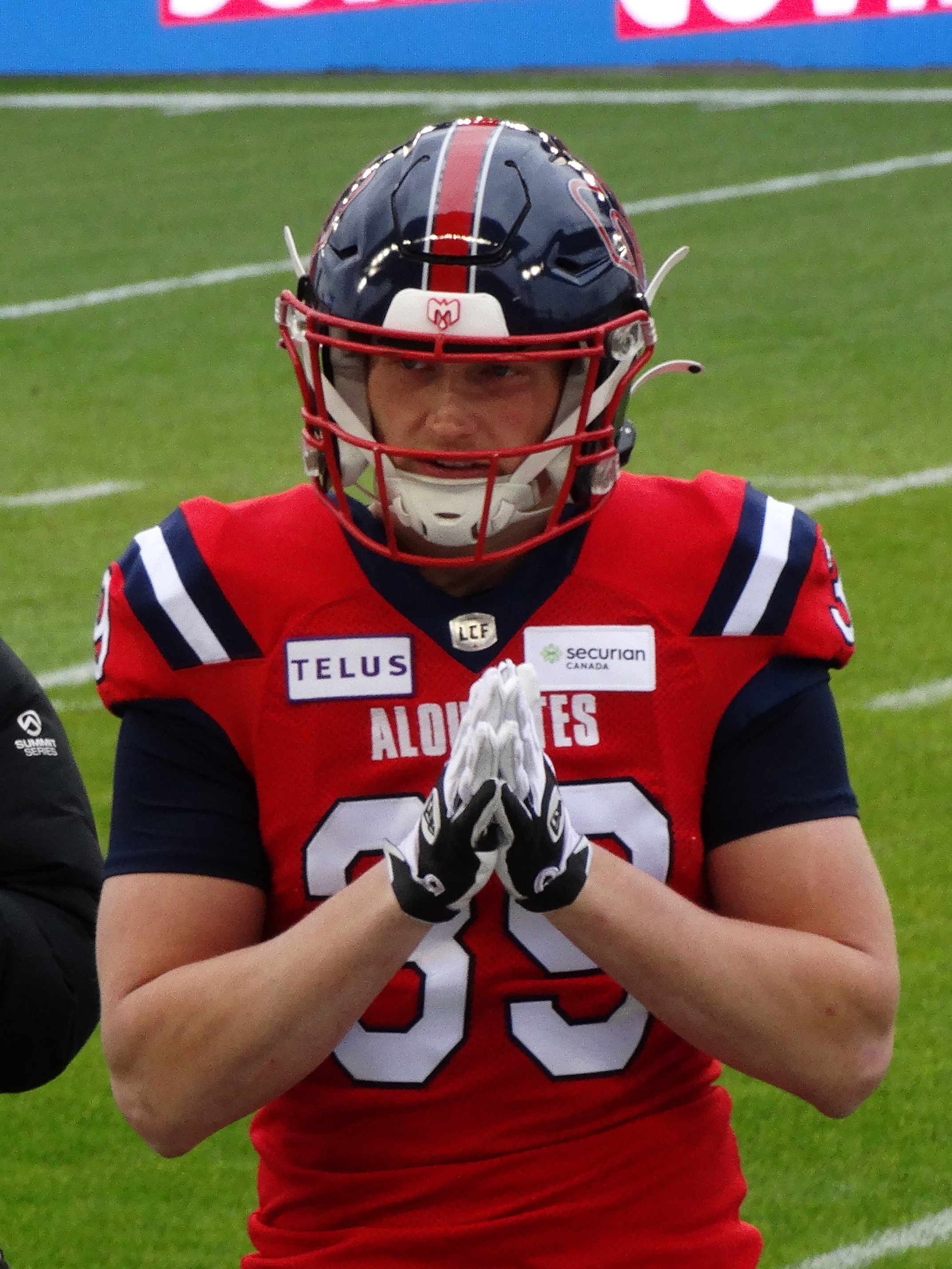
- Dallaire with the Montreal Alouettes in 2023

No. 39 – Montreal Alouettes
- Position: Fullback
- Roster status: Active
- CFL status: National

Personal information
- Born: August 5, 1999 (age 27); Saint-Georges, Quebec, Canada
- Listed height: 6 ft 3 in (1.91 m)
- Listed weight: 230 lb (104 kg)

Career information
- CEGEP: Beauce-Appalaches
- University: Laval
- CFL draft: 2023: 2nd round, 13th overall pick

Career history
- 2023–present: Montreal Alouettes

Awards and highlights
- Grey Cup champion (2023)
- Stats at CFL.ca

David Dallaire (born August 5, 1999) is a Canadian professional football fullback for the Montreal Alouettes of the Canadian Football League (CFL).

== University career ==
Dallaire played U Sports football for the Laval Rouge et Or. He caught a touchdown pass in the 57th Vanier Cup game as the Rouge et Or defeated the Saskatchewan Huskies.

== Professional career ==
Pre-draft measurables
Height	Weight	40-yard dash	20-yard shuttle	Three-cone drill	Vertical jump	Broad jump
6 ft 3 1/8 in (1.91 m)	220 lb (100 kg)	4.94 s	4.44 s	7.28 s	29.0 in (0.74 m)	8 ft 11 3/8 in (2.73 m)
All values from CFL Combine

Dallaire was drafted in the second round, 13th overall, by the Montreal Alouettes in the 2023 CFL draft and signed with the team on May 11, 2023. He made the team's active roster following training camp in 2023 and made his professional debut on June 10, 2023, against the Ottawa Redblacks. He played in all 18 regular season games where he had one carry for three yards, one reception for 17 yards, and five special teams tackles. He also played in both playoff games that year as the team advanced to the 110th Grey Cup.

== Personal life ==
Dallaire's older brother, Christian, also played for the Laval Rouge et Or football team.
