= Jason Maas =

American gridiron football player and coach (born 1975)

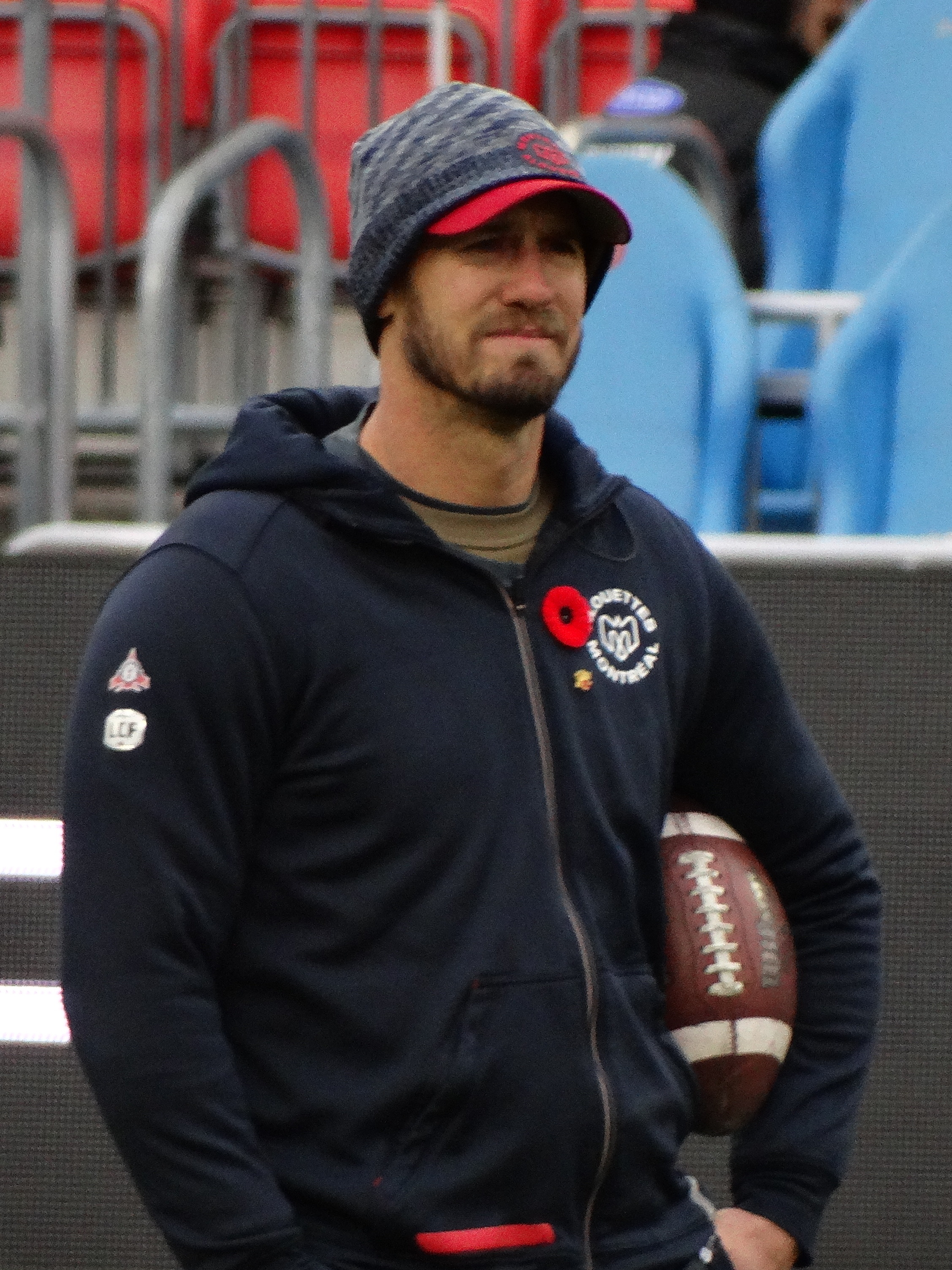
- Maas with the Montreal Alouettes in 2023

Montreal Alouettes
- Title: Head coach

Personal information
- Born: November 19, 1975 (age 51); Beaver Dam, Wisconsin, U.S.
- Listed height: 6 ft 2 in (1.88 m)
- Listed weight: 210 lb (95 kg)

Career information
- Position: Quarterback (No. 12, 11, 16)
- High school: Yuma (Yuma, Arizona)
- College: Oregon

Career history

Playing
- Baltimore Ravens (1999)*; Edmonton Eskimos (2000–2005); Hamilton Tiger-Cats (2006–2007); Montreal Alouettes (2007); Edmonton Eskimos (2008–2011)
- * Offseason or practice squad member only

Coaching
- Toronto Argonauts (2012–2014) Quarterbacks coach; Ottawa Redblacks (2015) Offensive coordinator; Edmonton Eskimos (2016–2019) Head coach/Offensive coordinator; Saskatchewan Roughriders (2020–2022) Offensive coordinator; Montreal Alouettes (2023–present) Head coach

Awards and highlights
- 4× Grey Cup champion (2003, 2005, 2012, 2023); Annis Stukus Trophy winner (2024); CFL West All-Star (2001); 2× Eskimos Most Outstanding Player (2001, 2004)

Jason Maas (born November 19, 1975) is an American professional football coach who is the head coach of the Montreal Alouettes of the Canadian Football League (CFL). He is best known for his playing career as a quarterback with the Edmonton Eskimos where he won two Grey Cup championships. He also played for the Alouettes and the Hamilton Tiger-Cats. He has coached the Toronto Argonauts, Ottawa Redblacks, and Saskatchewan Roughriders and was the head coach of the Eskimos from 2016 to 2019.

== Amateur career ==
During his high school career in Yuma, Arizona, Maas gained his first notice as a football player when the Phoenix Prep Sport magazine selected Maas as the most outstanding high-school quarterback in Arizona as a senior.

Maas went to college at the University of Oregon in 1994 but was buried deep on the depth chart for the first two years of his career. In his second year, Maas threw eighteen passes in mostly non-critical situations. However, in his third year, Maas was considered a solid bet to take Oregon's starting job, until the arrival of high-profile transfer Akili Smith. Smith was drawing rave reviews from the football establishment as a better pure athlete, but Maas's numbers early in the year were comparable. Maas performed well by throwing for five touchdowns in a game against Stanford, but Smith won the starting job.

Maas spent the rest of his time at Oregon as a backup, finishing with career totals of 120 completions on 226 attempts, 1,763 yards, nineteen touchdowns and eight interceptions. Both Maas and Smith left Oregon in 1999, and while Smith was drafted third overall by the Cincinnati Bengals, Maas went undrafted.

== Professional football ==
As a career backup in college, Maas drew little interest from the professional ranks. On April 23, 1999, Maas signed with the National Football League's Baltimore Ravens during preseason. He appeared in a single preseason game and did not impress the coaching staff enough to win a roster spot.

=== Joining the CFL ===
For the 2000 CFL season Maas signed with the Edmonton Eskimos, where the coaching staff intended to use him as a backup and (with Dan Crowley) the holder on field goal and extra point attempts. The Eskimos were, at the time, one of the league's deepest teams at the quarterback position, with Maas, Crowley, and incumbent starter Nealon Greene all eventually assuming starting jobs somewhere in the CFL during their careers. Maas dressed for all eighteen games but saw significant action in only one, going 16 of 25 for 165 yards, a touchdown, and an interception. The Eskimos were eliminated in the Western finals by the B.C. Lions.

During the preseason of 2001, Eskimos head coach Don Matthews was fired in a famously messy separation, allegedly for health reasons, and was replaced by Tom Higgins. Higgins later developed a reputation for changing quarterbacks frequently, and although Greene had been the starter in Edmonton for two years, his spotty arm was beginning to draw criticism from fans. The door was wide open for the two backups, Crowley and Maas, to show that they could take the reins from the faltering Greene. Crowley was strong and Greene fought valiantly to keep his job, but by Week 7, Maas took the starting quarterback spot that he kept to the end of the year.

Maas picked the league apart in his first year as a starter, and despite his late start was a West Division All-Star and the Edmonton nominee for CFL Outstanding Player. He completed 231 of 391 pass attempts for 3,646 yards, recording 21 touchdowns and 12 interceptions. His performance in the 2001 Labour Day Classic, when Maas was the offensive star and recorded a late 23-yard run to set up the winning field goal as time expired, made him a fan favourite. Maas led the Eskimos to first place in one of the weakest Western Divisions of all time, as the Eskimos won the division by winning only as many as they lost. The end of the year was sour as the Eskimos were blown out by the rival Calgary Stampeders in the Western Final, 34–18. Maas emerged with little credit in the defeat, and after two straight years of disappointment, the local media were beginning to speculate whether the Eskimos were ever going to get past the Western Final.

=== Professional setbacks ===
Maas emerged from the 2001 season secure as the incumbent starter. Potential rivals Crowley and Greene were gone for 2002, Crowley to the newly minted Ottawa Renegades in the expansion draft, where he became their starting quarterback, and Greene to the Saskatchewan Roughriders in a trade. The two backups were Bart Hendricks and an unknown named Ricky Ray, neither of whom was expected to challenge Maas for the starting job. Maas was named Offensive Player of the Week in Week 2 and was on pace for another All-Star season.

However, in Week 4 against Nealon Greene's Roughriders, Maas suffered a separated shoulder in his non-throwing arm and the injury was serious enough to sideline Maas for several games. The nominal number two was Hendricks, but he was unavailable, and the third-stringer Ray temporarily took over the starting role for the Eskimos.

Ray seized his chance, and in his first CFL start threw for four touchdowns against the B.C. Lions. As fans watched with delight, Ray piled up remarkable numbers during Maas's recovery, leading to an inevitable showdown when the former starter returned. After missing three weeks, Maas returned against the Winnipeg Blue Bombers and was utterly forgettable. One mediocre game was all Higgins needed to see and Maas was immediately sent to the bench in favour of Ray, who started the next five games.

However, reminiscent of Maas's junior season in Oregon with Akili Smith, Higgins seemed unable to make up his mind. In a game against the Hamilton Tiger-Cats, Ray struggled, and Maas came in, successfully engineering an Eskimos comeback. Ray started the next game but in the game after, the second-to-last game of the season, Maas again appeared in relief and was again solid. Finally, in the last game of the year, Maas got the start and played well.

In his first season, Ray had recorded almost 3,000 passing yards and a quarterback rating over 100, helping the Eskimos win the West Division for the third consecutive year with the third consecutive starting quarterback. Maas had played less often but still well and had started to win back the confidence of the fans and of the team with a strong end to the season. But for the playoffs Higgins returned to Ray, who led the Eskimos to the 90th Grey Cup, which they lost to the Montreal Alouettes, coached by Maas's first CFL head coach, Don Matthews.

In 2003, Maas was looking to regain his starting job from Ray but suffered a back injury during the off-season. The condition was severe enough to require surgery and Ray became the starter out of training camp. Maas was the holder for kicker Sean Fleming as he healed, but by Week eight he was completely healthy. However, Higgins had drawn criticism for his "quarterback by committee" in 2002 and had little desire to repeat the adventure. Maas was entrenched on the bench as Ray helped deliver the Eskimos the 91st Grey Cup in a rematch with the Alouettes.

=== Opportunity knocks ===
After 2003, Ray was a hot commodity. NFL scouts were known to be looking at Ray, and during the offseason, Ray was able to stick with the New York Jets. The loss of the star quarterback dismayed Eskimos fans, but this was tempered with calm knowing that Maas was around to fill the void in 2004.

The pressure on Maas was high, but his performance was up to it. Maas threw for an incredible 5,274 yards, well higher than Ray's 2003 total of 4,640. Maas threw for "only" 31 touchdowns, four fewer than Ray's 35 in 2003, but his 105.1 quarterback rating ranked among the great seasons ever. In an ironic scene for Maas, he lost the Most Outstanding Player award to Lions quarterback Casey Printers who took over the starting role after an injury to incumbent superstar Dave Dickenson, similar to Ray taking over for Maas.

Maas had a strong playoff performance in his single game, throwing for 369 yards in the West Semi-Final. But despite Maas' numbers the offense just was not there as the Eskimos lost a wet and miserable game to Henry Burris and the Saskatchewan Roughriders 14–6. Maas's career playoff record fell to 0–2, and head coach Higgins was fired as a result of the loss.

=== Return to the bench ===
Unfortunately for Maas's individual numbers, Ray struggled south of the border. He never threw a regular season pass with the Jets, and after being released tried in vain to catch on with another NFL team in time for the 2005 NFL season. Conjecture immediately ran high that Ray would be lured back to the Eskimos with a relatively big-money deal, which soon followed. In addition, Maas faced additional competition from recently signed former Most Outstanding Player Khari Jones.

Former offensive coordinator and new head coach Danny Maciocia had led Maas's offense during his 2004 season, but he also knew that the starting quarterback had to be decisively selected and stuck to. After preseason, Maciocia chose and stuck to Ray, returning Maas to the bench for the 2005 CFL season. Maas saw little game action in the regular season, appearing only in relief for the final game, a blowout loss to the Calgary Stampeders.

However, entering into the next week's Western Semi-final game against the Stampeders, Ricky Ray was being criticized for his recent play, and after a relatively poor first half, Maciocia put Maas in for Ray for the second half. Maas re-ignited the dormant Eskimos offense and led them to a comeback victory, resurrecting the old quarterback controversy that had plagued the Eskimos for years. Maas followed this up by again appearing in relief during the fourth quarter over Ray in the West Division final against the Lions, scoring the winning touchdown and leading the Eskimos to another victory. Once again, perhaps because of rumours Maas had already been traded to the Hamilton Tiger-Cats for veteran quarterback Danny McManus and lineman Tim Bakker, Maciocia opted to start Ray in the 93rd Grey Cup. Ray played the whole game and won it, being named MVP in the process. After the game, confirming what TSN called "the CFL's worst-kept secret", Maas was traded to the Tiger-Cats.

=== Starting in Steeltown ===
The Tiger-Cats had a busy off-season after the 2005 season. Along with Maas, the Tiger-Cats also acquired running back Josh Ranek from the defunct Ottawa Renegades, running back/return man and reigning Most Outstanding Special Teams Player Corey Holmes from the Saskatchewan Roughriders in exchange for the first overall pick in Ottawa's dispersal draft (Saskatchewan selected quarterback Kerry Joseph). Significantly for Maas, the team also added his former favourite target in Edmonton, receiver Terry Vaughn, from Montreal as a free agent.

In spite of the big names added to the offense, the Tiger-Cats struggled immediately and badly. On July 10, 2006, the Tiger-Cats relieved head coach Greg Marshall of his duties after an 0–4 start, appointing 67-year-old veteran head coach Ron Lancaster as his replacement. The team also fired offensive coordinator Joe Paopao, offensive line coach Kani Kauahi, and replaced interim general manager since 2005 Rob Katz with former Montreal assistant GM Marcel Desjardins later in the season. Before the Tiger-Cats' Labour Day Classic game against Toronto, Hamilton was in last place in the East Division. Maas was seventh in the league in passing yardage, tied for seventh in touchdown passes, and tied for second in interceptions. Two of the players ahead of Maas in yardage and touchdowns, Dave Dickenson and Kerry Joseph, had struggled with injuries during the season, and the player tied with Maas's seven touchdowns was British Columbia backup Buck Pierce. The Tiger-Cats would fall to 2–10 after Labour Day, with Maas getting no credit in a 40–6 pummeling by the Argonauts.

For the 2007 CFL season Maas began the year as the starter for the Tiger-Cats. They had another rough start to the season at 1–8, prompting the pick-up of NFL castoff, and 2004 CFL MOP, Casey Printers.

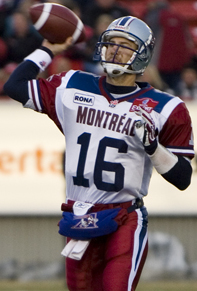
Maas in 2007 with the Alouettes.

=== Traded to Montreal ===
On September 7, 2007, in the wake of Hamilton's signing of Casey Printers, recently cut by the Kansas City Chiefs, Hamilton traded Maas to the Montreal Alouettes in exchange for Canadian fullback Jeff Piercy. Maas initially refused to report to his new club, a move which momentarily held up the formalization of the transaction. Maas served as the team's third-string quarterback behind Marcus Brady and Anthony Calvillo. Maas saw limited time on the field with the Alouettes and was released on December 31, 2007.

=== Back to Edmonton ===
January 16, 2008, the Edmonton Eskimos announced Maas was back in the green and gold. Come training camp, Maas and Lefors battled for the second-string quarterback spot but were both named 2 and 2A by head coach Danny Maciocca. Maas saw about two quarters of playing time in the second preseason game of 2008 and impressed, completing 16 of 19 passes for 256 yards and a touchdown. Maas remained the Eskimos backup for 2009, but for 2010 seemed to have been demoted to third-stringer early in the season in favour of Jared Zabransky. Maas's new tenure was rumored to be an apprenticeship for a coaching job within the organization. However, Maas wished to continue playing if he couldn't play for the Eskimos, so he was released on February 22, 2011, to potentially land with another team. Maas officially retired from the CFL after an eleven-year career as a player on May 26, 2011.

== Coaching career ==
=== Toronto Argonauts ===
On December 20, 2011, Maas was named the receivers coach for the Toronto Argonauts. On February 24, 2012, it was announced that Maas would shift duties to become the quarterbacks coach. He spent three seasons with the Argonauts, winning a Grey Cup championship in 2012.

=== Ottawa Redblacks ===
On December 3, 2014, Maas was introduced as the offensive coordinator of the Ottawa Redblacks. In the 2015 CFL season, Ottawa led the league in offensive yards, passing yards, and rushing touchdowns. The offense also featured the league's Most Outstanding Player in quarterback Henry Burris and four 1000-yard receivers, which was only the third time that a team featured four 1000-yard receivers in the same season.

=== Edmonton Eskimos ===
Maas was named the new head coach of the Edmonton Eskimos on December 14, 2015. The team finished with a 10–8 regular season record in 2016, but finished fourth in a strong West Division. After a strong 12–6 finish and trip to the West Final in 2017, Maas' Eskimos faltered in 2018 missing the playoffs for the first time since 2013. While the Eskimos finished with a 9–9 record, they placed fifth in a strong West Division that year. The team finished 8–10 during the following season and in fourth place, qualifying once again as the crossover team and qualified for the East Division playoffs. The Eskimos were defeated that year by the Hamilton Tiger-Cats in the East Final. That would be his last game as the team's head coach, as Maas was relieved of his coaching duties on November 27, 2019.

=== Saskatchewan Roughriders ===
On December 5, 2019, it was reported that Maas had agreed to join the Saskatchewan Roughriders as their offensive coordinator, but the announcement had not yet been made official by the team. The appointment was made official on December 6, 2019, when it was announced that he was signed by the team through to the 2021 season. On November 1, 2022, after a disappointing season, the Riders announced they would not be renewing Maas' contract, along with three other offensive coaches.

=== Montreal Alouettes ===
In early December 2022, it was reported that Maas was one of five finalists for the vacant Alouettes head coaching job. On December 17, 2022, it was announced that Maas had been hired as the head coach for the Alouettes. In his first season, he led the Alouettes to an 11–7 regular season record and his first appearance in a Grey Cup game as a head coach, winning the eighth Grey Cup title for the Alouettes. In an English interview on TSN, Québec player Marc-Antoine Dequoy thanked Maas for emphasizing that the players learn French and embrace Québec culture. Maas was rewarded with a three-year contract extension on December 20, 2023, that would keep him with the Alouettes through to the 2026 season. On October 20, 2025, Maas and the Alouettes agreed to a two-year extension, keeping him with the team until 2028.

=== CFL coaching record ===
Team	Year	Regular season					Postseason		
Team	Year	Won	Lost	Ties	Win %	Finish	Won	Lost	Result
EDM	2016	10	8	0	.556	4th in West Division	1	1	Lost in East Final
EDM	2017	12	6	0	.667	3rd in West Division	1	1	Lost in West Final
EDM	2018	9	9	0	.500	5th in West Division	–	–	Did not qualify
EDM	2019	8	10	0	.444	4th in West Division	1	1	Lost in East Final
EDM total		39	33	0	.542		3	3	.500
MTL	2023	11	7	0	.611	2nd in East Division	3	0	Won Grey Cup
MTL	2024	12	5	1	.694	1st in East Division	0	1	Lost in East Final
MTL	2025	10	8	0	.556	2nd in East Division	2	1	Lost in Grey Cup
MTL	2026	14	4	0	.778	1st in East Division	1	1	Lost in Grey Cup
MTL total		47	24	1	.660		6	3	.667
Total		86	57	1	.601	2 Division Championships	9	6	1 Grey Cup

== Personal life ==
Maas's father Gary Alan Maas (aged 29), a police officer, was shot and killed on April 9, 1986, when Maas was only ten. Maas is married and lives in Sherwood Park, Alberta with his wife, Marjean and their two children during the off-season and in Rosemont, Quebec during the season.
