= Michael Lionello =

Canadian gridiron football coach (born 1990)

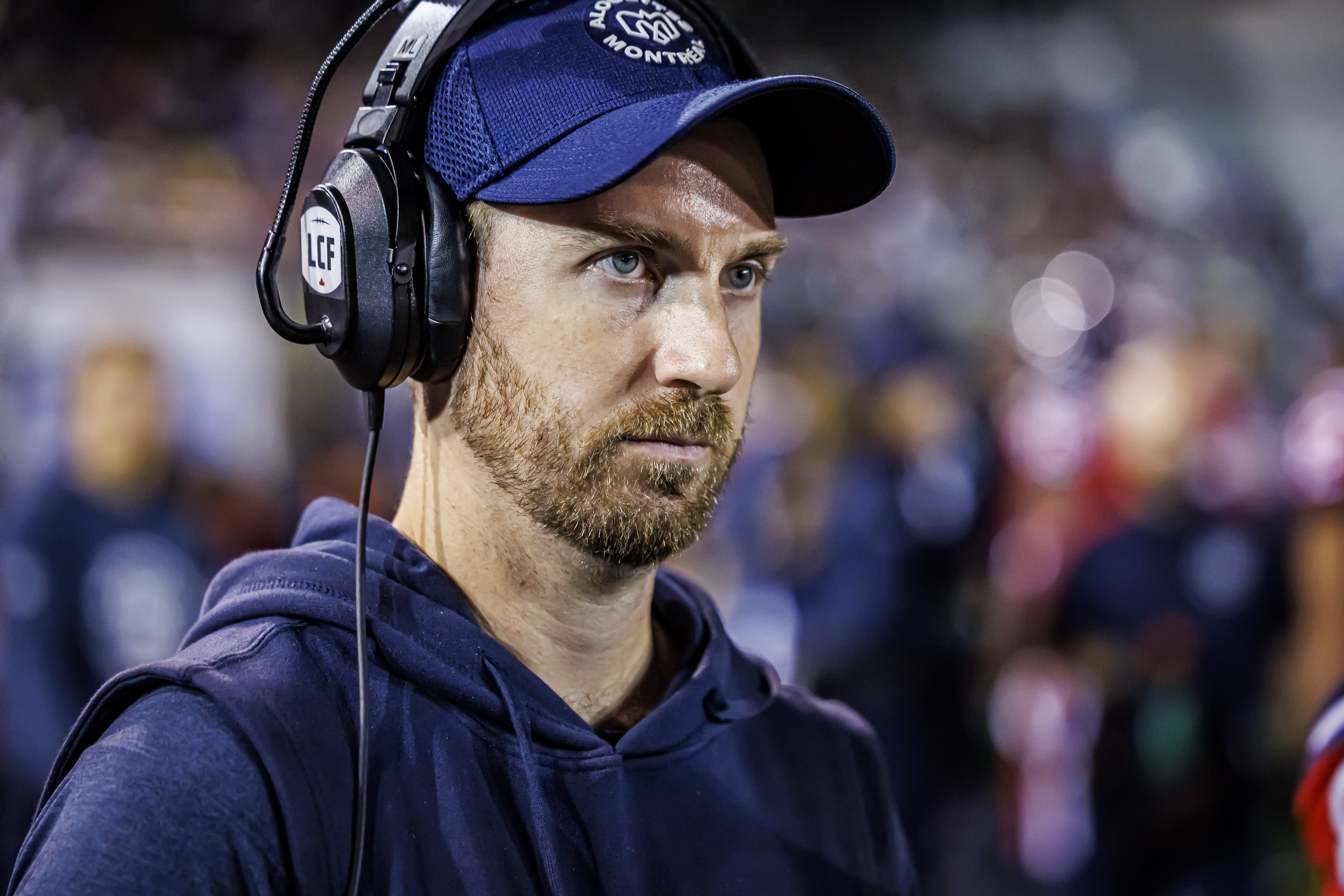
- Lionello with the Montreal Alouettes in 2024

Montreal Alouettes
- Title: Pass Game Coordinator & Receivers Coach

Personal information
- Born: 1990 (age 35–36); Vancouver, British Columbia, Canada

Career information
- High school: South Delta Secondary
- University: Victoria

Career history

Coaching
- 2015: Simon Fraser Clan (Running backs coach)
- 2016: BC Lions (Quality control coach)
- 2017–2018: BC Lions (Running backs coach)
- 2019: Toronto Argonauts (Running backs coach)
- 2020–2021: Montreal Alouettes (Offensive assistant)
- 2022–present: Montreal Alouettes (Pass Game Coordinator & Receivers coach)

Operations
- 2014–2015: Simon Fraser Clan (Director of football operations) (Recruiting co-coordinator)

Awards and highlights
- Grey Cup champion (2023)

Michael Lionello is a Canadian professional football coach who is the Pass Game Coordinator & Receivers Coach for the Montreal Alouettes of the Canadian Football League (CFL). He is a Grey Cup champion after winning with the Alouettes in 2023.

== Early life ==
Lionello grew up in Delta, British Columbia and played high school football at South Delta Secondary in his senior year. He later attended the University of Victoria.

== Coaching career ==
=== Simon Fraser Clan ===
Lionello began his coaching career with the Simon Fraser Clan in 2013 after emailing head coach Dave Johnson and offering assistance with the team. In 2014, he served as the team's director of football operations and in 2015, he added the titles of running backs coach, recruiting co-coordinator, and video coordinator.

=== BC Lions ===
Lionello joined the coaching staff of BC Lions as their quality control coach on March 8, 2016. He was promoted to running backs coach in 2017 and served in that role for two seasons.

=== Toronto Argonauts ===
On March 26, 2019, it was announced that Lionello had joined the Toronto Argonauts as the team's running backs coach, reuniting him with former SFU head coach, Jacques Chapdelaine, who was the team's offensive coordinator.

=== Montreal Alouettes ===
On January 9, 2020, it was announced that Lionello had been hired as an offensive assistant for the Montreal Alouettes. However, he did not coach in 2020 following the cancellation of the 2020 CFL season. On May 11, 2022, he was promoted to receivers coach for the team. He won his first Grey Cup championship in 2023 after the Alouettes defeated the Winnipeg Blue Bombers in the 110th Grey Cup game.
