= 110th Grey Cup =

2023 Canadian Football championship game

Winnipeg Blue Bombers	Montreal Alouettes
(14–4)	(11–7)
24	28
Head coach: Mike O'Shea	Head coach: Jason Maas
	1	2	3	4	Total
Winnipeg Blue Bombers	10	7	0	7	24
Montreal Alouettes	7	0	7	14	28
- Date: November 19, 2023
- Stadium: Tim Hortons Field
- Location: Hamilton
- Most Valuable Player: Cody Fajardo, QB (Alouettes)
- Most Valuable Canadian: Tyson Philpot, WR (Alouettes)
- Favourite: Blue Bombers by 7.5
- National anthem: Simone Soman
- Coin toss: Mary Simon
- Referee: Tim Kroeker
- Halftime show: Green Day
- Attendance: 28,808

Broadcasters
- Network: Canada (English): TSN; Canada (French): RDS; Worldwide: CFL+
- Announcers: Rod Smith (TSN play-by-play); Glen Suitor (TSN analyst); Claire Hanna (TSN sideline reporter); Matthew Scianitti (TSN sideline reporter); David Arsenault (RDS play-by-play); Pierre Vercheval (RDS analyst); Didier Orméjuste (RDS sideline reporter)

The 110th Grey Cup was played to determine the Canadian Football League (CFL) champion for the 2023 season. The game was played on November 19, 2023, at Tim Hortons Field in Hamilton, Ontario, between the West Division champion Winnipeg Blue Bombers and the East Division champion Montreal Alouettes. The Alouettes defeated the Blue Bombers, 28–24. It was the 12th time that Hamilton had hosted the Grey Cup, the previous having been in 2021.

== Host ==
Due to Ontario COVID-19 public health orders still in effect as of mid-October 2021, all in-person entertainment festivities for the 108th Grey Cup in Hamilton in 2021 were cancelled. It was therefore announced on October 14, 2021, that the 110th Grey Cup in 2023 would be awarded to Hamilton, in order to allow organizers to host the Grey Cup and all associated festivities as originally planned.

=== Entertainment ===
The Hamilton Sports Group announced that the Grey Cup Festival would be held in downtown Hamilton from November 16 to 18, 2023. A 35-yard football field was planned to be constructed at the John Weir Foote Armoury; it hosted a multi-day flag football tournament. The Hamilton Convention Centre, FirstOntario Centre, and Bridgeworks hosted parties for all CFL teams and the annual CFL Alumni Association Legends Luncheon was held on November 17, 2023, at LIUNA Station.

== Date ==
Per the latest Collective Bargaining Agreement signed in 2022, the league had the option of starting the 2023 season by up to 30 days sooner, which could have significantly altered the date of this game. However, the league chose to continue with the existing scheduling formula and the Hamilton Tiger-Cats confirmed that the game would be played on November 19, 2023 (the third Sunday of November).

== Entertainment ==
Pop singer and Ontario native Jamie Fine sang during the pre-game kickoff show. The Canadian national anthem was sung by Canada's Got Talent semifinalist Simone Soman, making her the first blind singer to perform the anthem at the game. American rock band Green Day performed during the halftime show. They performed four songs, "The American Dream is Killing Me", "Basket Case", "Boulevard of Broken Dreams", and "Holiday".

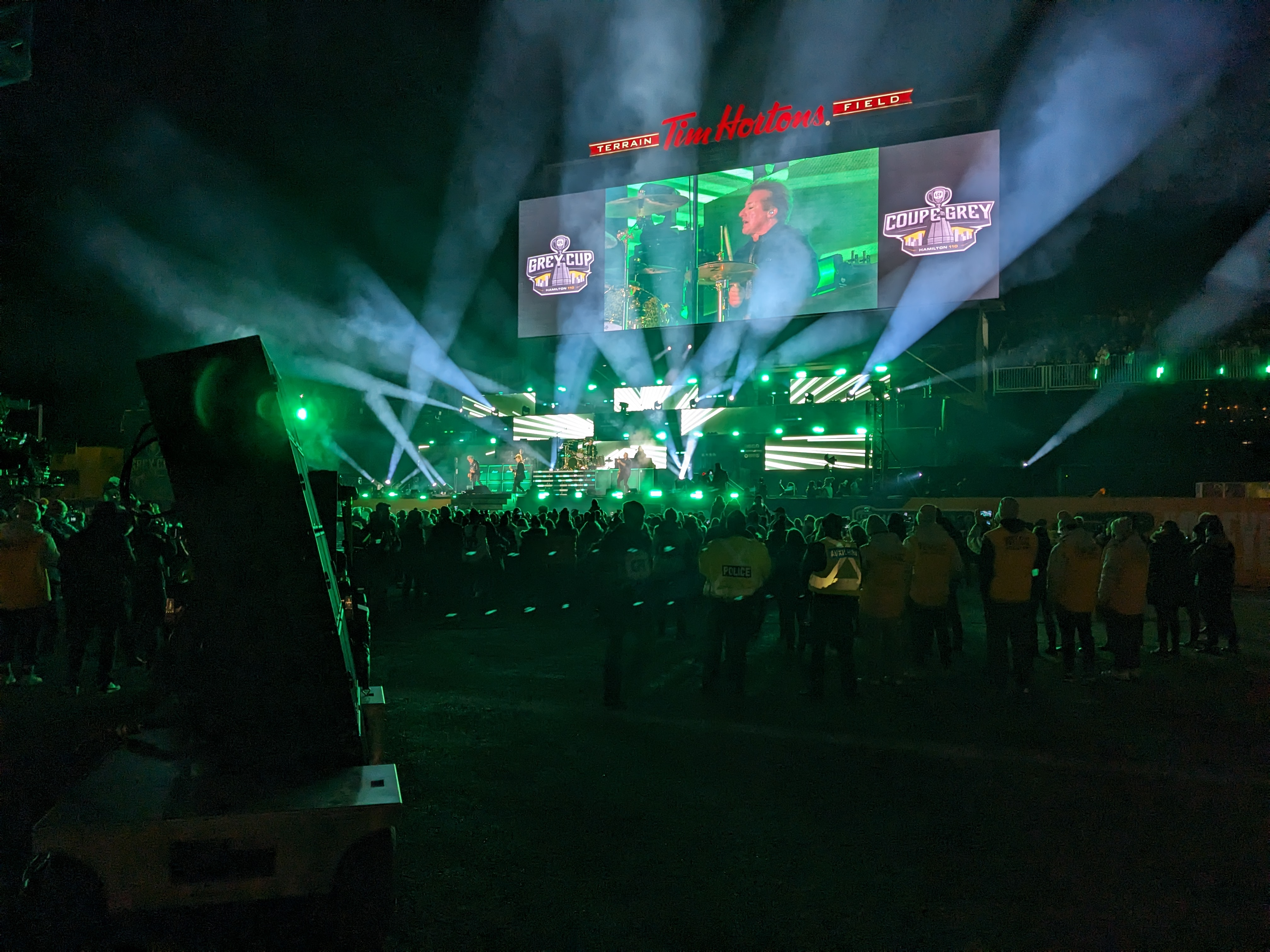
Green Day playing the half-time show at the 110th Grey Cup

== Teams ==
The game featured the Winnipeg Blue Bombers, playing in their fourth consecutive Grey Cup, versus the Montreal Alouettes, holders of the record for the longest Grey Cup appearance drought, having last appeared in a championship game in 2010. The Alouettes made their 19th Grey Cup appearance while the Blue Bombers made their league-leading 28th appearance in the title game. The Alouettes were attempting to win their eighth championship and the Blue Bombers were attempting to win their 13th, including their third in four years.

=== Montreal Alouettes ===
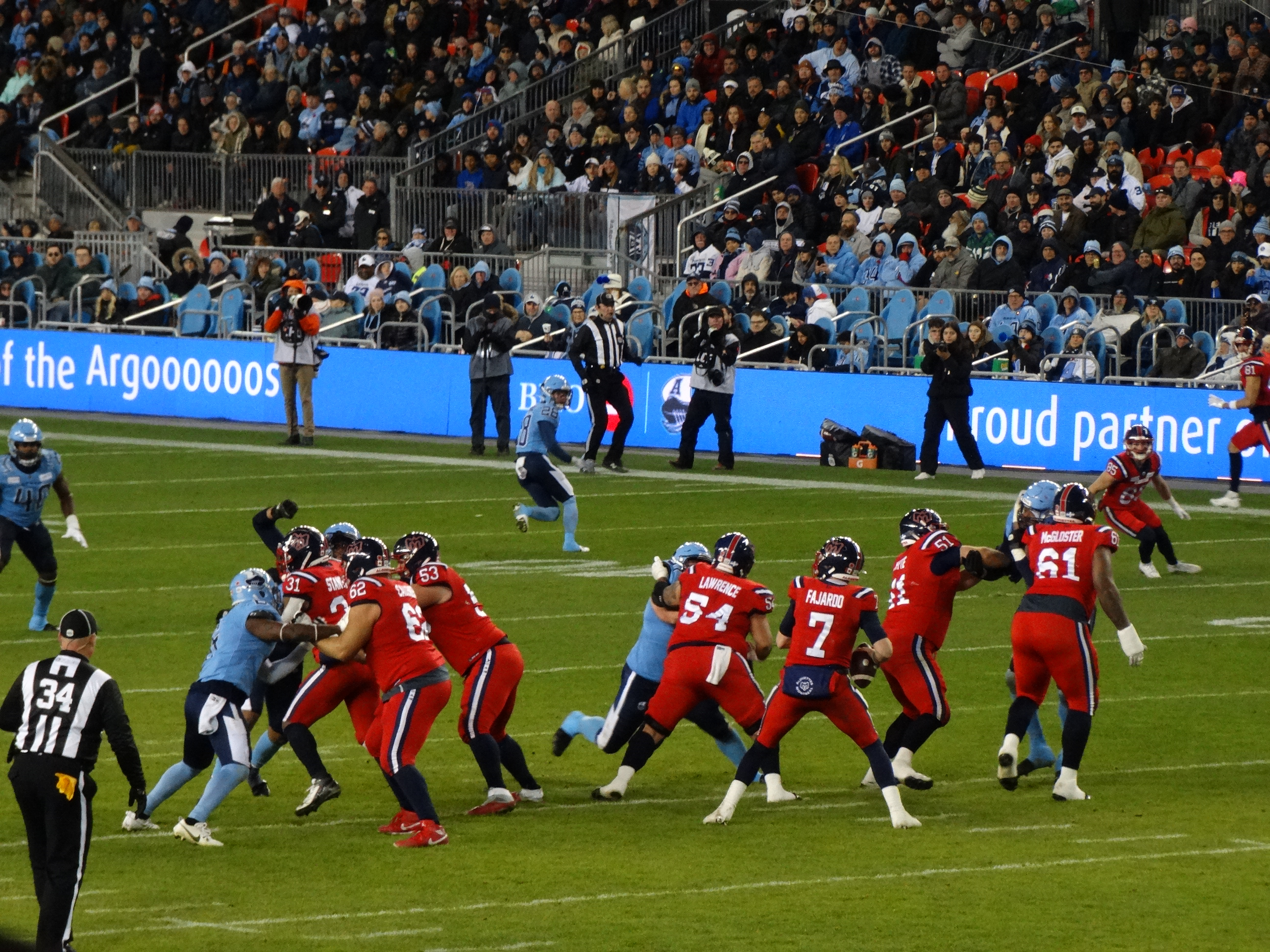
The Alouettes defeated the heavily favoured Argonauts in the East Final.

The Alouettes finished in second place in the East Division after qualifying for the playoffs for the fourth consecutive year. The team finished with an 11–7 record, but notably won every game against teams that finished with losing records, and lost every game against teams that finished with winning records. Because they faced the Blue Bombers, Lions, and Argonauts back-to-back in their schedule, the Alouettes started the season on a two-game winning streak, followed by a three-game losing streak, then a four-game winning streak, then a four-game losing streak, and finally a five-game winning streak. The Alouettes qualified for the playoffs following their week 17 win over the Ottawa Redblacks. In the playoffs, the team handily defeated the Hamilton Tiger-Cats 27–12 in the East Semi-Final as they held their opponent to four field goals and no touchdowns. In the East final, the Alouettes would face the heavily favoured 16–2 Argonauts, a team to whom the Alouettes had already lost three times during the regular season. However, the Alouettes forced nine Toronto turnovers: four interceptions including two that went for touchdowns, four turnovers on downs, and a fumble recovery. The Alouettes dominated the Argonauts and won the game 38–17 in front of the largest crowd to watch an Argonauts game at BMO Field.

=== Winnipeg Blue Bombers ===
The Blue Bombers were again a force to be reckoned with in the regular season as they finished with a 14–4 record. The Blue Bombers secured a playoff spot for the seventh straight season in their 13th game with a victory over the Saskatchewan Roughriders in the Banjo Bowl on September 9, 2023. However, the Winnipeg Blue Bombers did face a challenge for first place in the West Division from the BC Lions as the two teams had identical 11–4 records heading into their week 16 match-up that would determine who won the season series. The Blue Bombers won the game in overtime and the Lions lost the following week, so the Blue Bombers secured their third consecutive division title. Winnipeg played two games that were meaningless in the standings to end the season, but still won both despite resting some starters in both games. Following their playoff bye week, the Blue Bombers faced the BC Lions in the West Division Final, but had a dominant defensive performance as they tied a league playoff record with nine sacks and held the Lions to just one Hail Mary touchdown and the Blue Bombers won 24–13.

=== Head-to-head ===
The Winnipeg Blue Bombers defeated the Montreal Alouettes in both regular season meetings in 2023, with the Bombers winning 17–3 on Canada Day and then winning 47–17 at IG Field on August 24, 2023. In their first meeting, the Blue Bombers had 185 rushing yards, including 120 from Brady Oliveira, and Zach Collaros threw for 177 yards and two touchdowns. The Winnipeg defence held Montreal to three points, led by Willie Jefferson, who had two sacks and a fumble recovery, and Cameron Lawson who had two sacks and a forced fumble, and Brandon Alexander who intercepted Cody Fajardo in the red zone. In the second meeting, the Blue Bombers' defence again held the Alouettes' offence to three points as the Alouettes scored their only majors from interceptions from Marc-Antoine Dequoy and Tyrell Richards. The Winnipeg defence held Fajardo to just 137 yards passing and one interception and leading rusher William Stanback to 32 yards rushing. Collaros threw for four touchdowns and three inceptions and Oliveira nearly matched his previous total with 119 rushing yards and one touchdown.

While this was the first Grey Cup game played between these franchises, it was their third postseason meeting. The teams split their previous two playoff contests. (Note: The teams' previous postseason games were the 2000 East Division Final (won by Montreal) and the 2007 East Division Semi-Final (won by Winnipeg), both played when the Blue Bombers were members of the East Division due to the absence of a CFL team in Ottawa. This does not include two playoff losses by Winnipeg to the Baltimore Stallions, the organization that re-activated the Alouettes franchise after the end of the CFL's U.S. expansion era. Neither the Blue Bombers nor the Alouettes ever qualified for the playoffs as a cross-over team up to and including the 2023 season. Overall, the 2023 campaign was the 55th non-consecutive season of professional Canadian football since the end of World War II in which Winnipeg and Montreal fielded teams in different divisions.)

=== Uniforms ===
As the East Division representative in a Grey Cup held in an East Division city, the Montreal Alouettes were the designated home team for the game and used the home team's dressing room. The Alouettes wore their blue jerseys and blue pants and the Blue Bombers wore their white jerseys with gold pants and used the visitors' locker room.

== Game summary ==
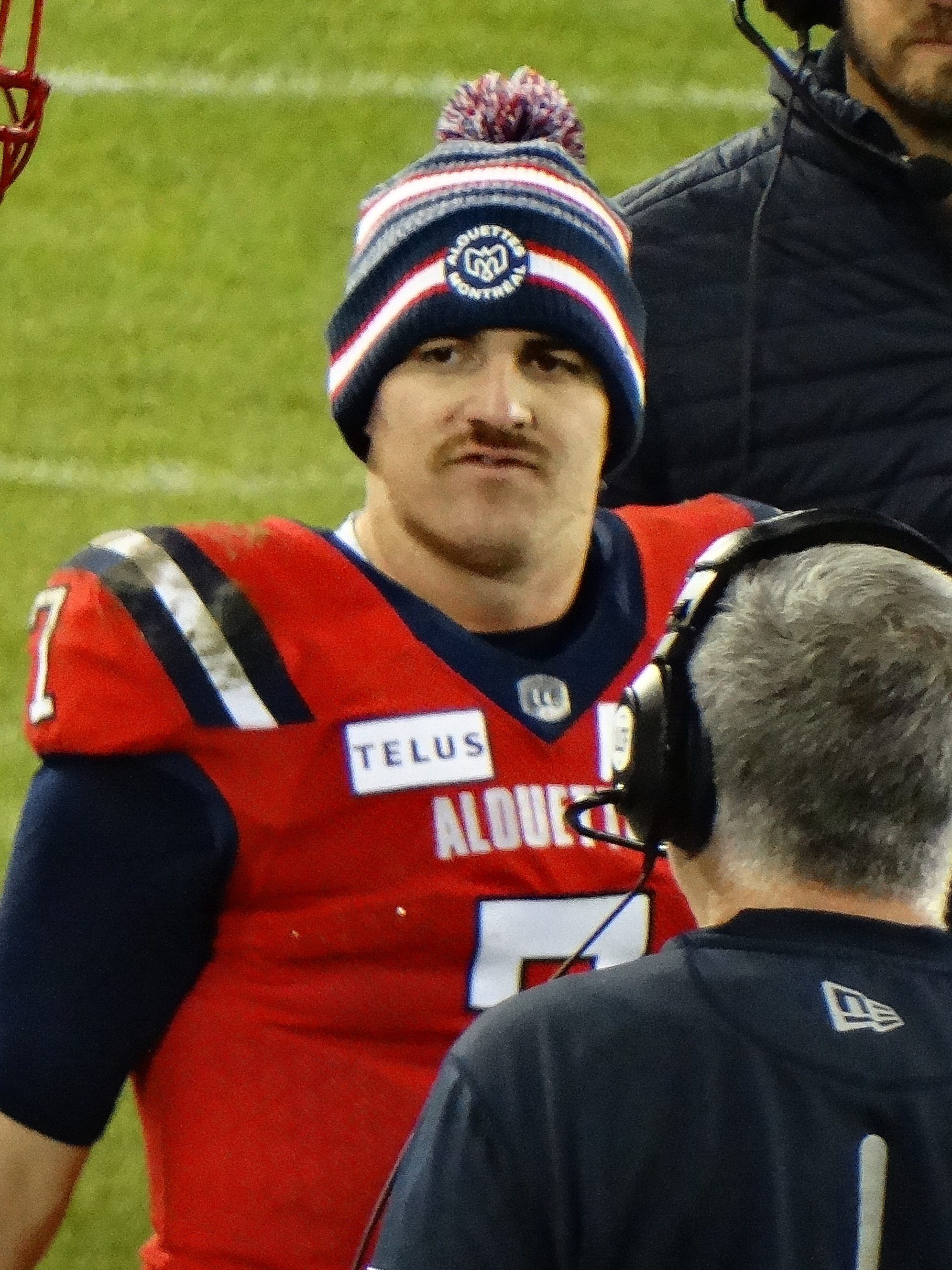
Cody Fajardo was the game's MVP.

The Alouettes won the coin toss and elected to defer to the second half. Winnipeg opened the scoring with a field goal by Sergio Castillo at 6:28 in the first quarter. After a Montreal two-and-out, Winnipeg then went on an eight-play, 66-yard drive that ended in Brady Oliveira scoring a five-yard touchdown. Montreal then responded with a seven-play, 77-yard drive, highlighted by Austin Mack's 31-yard catch, which ended with William Stanback scoring a 32-yard rushing touchdown to close out the first quarter.

In the second quarter, Montreal was unable to capitalize on a turnover after rookie defensive back Kabion Ento stripped Winnipeg's Oliveira of the ball. The two teams then punted back and forth until Winnipeg's special teams forced a fumble from returner James Letcher Jr. Alouettes' head coach Jason Maas challenged the play for a no yards penalty, but the call stood and the Blue Bombers took possession on the Alouettes' 29-yard line with 5:33 remaining in the half. After five plays, Winnipeg's Dakota Prukop scored on a one-yard quarterback sneak to extend their lead to 17–7. On the ensuing possession by Montreal, Letcher returned the kickoff to the team's 50-yard line, where quarterback Cody Fajardo marched the team down to Winnipeg's three-yard line. Stanback ran for two yards on first down and then Caleb Evans was stopped twice on Winnipeg's one-yard line which led to a turnover on downs. The Blue Bombers then ran out then remaining eight seconds on the clock to maintain their 17–7 lead to close out the first half.

Montreal received the kickoff to begin the second half where Fajardo completed a 33-yard pass to Mack who made a one-handed catch while being pulled down by his left arm by Demerio Houston. On the next play, Fajardo threw a 23-yard touchdown pass to Cole Spieker to cut the Blue Bombers' lead to three points. On the next drive, Winnipeg began on their own 45-yard line and advanced the ball down to Montreal's nine-yard line in seven plays. However, Winnipeg's Zach Collaros was intercepted by Ento in the endzone on a pass that was intended for Kenny Lawler. The Alouettes were unable to score on the ensuing drive, but a 61-yard punt by Joseph Zema pinned the Blue Bombers on their own nine-yard line. Winnipeg was able to advance the ball to their own 42-yard line, but were still forced to punt to end the third quarter with the score remaining 17–14.

On the second play of the fourth quarter, Fajardo was intercepted by Evan Holm on a deep pass intended for Mack, which gave Winnipeg possession at their own 21-yard line. However, after Collaros was sacked by Reggie Stubblefield, the Blue Bombers were forced to punt after a two-and-out, where returner Tyson Philpot returned the ball 30 yards to the Winnipeg 28-yard line. The Alouettes had a quick three-play drive that ended in a Mack 13-yard touchdown reception from Fajardo and Montreal took their first lead of the game. On the following kickoff, Janarion Grant returned the ball to Winnipeg's 54-yard line to set up good field position for their next drive. The Blue Bombers then marched down the field in nine plays where Prukop scored his second touchdown on a four-yard run where the team reclaimed their lead and made the score 24–21 with 5:28 remaining. The two teams exchanged punts on short drives and Montreal got the ball back at their 27-yard line with 1:55 remaining in the game.

The Alouettes advanced to the 55-yard line, but Fajardo took an eight-yard loss on first down as he was sacked by Shayne Gauthier. Fajardo then rushed for 13 yards to set up a third-and-five where Maas called for a deep pass to Spieker, who made a 31-yard catch at the Winnipeg 19-yard line. On the next play, Fajardo threw a 19-yard pass to Philpot for a touchdown to put the Alouettes ahead 28–24 with 13 seconds left. After Grant returned the ball to the Winnipeg 42-yard line, the Blue Bombers had eight seconds to try to score a touchdown. The Blue Bombers advanced to the 54-yard line where, on the last play of the game, Collaros completed a 14-yard pass to punter Jamieson Sheahan who had a 35-yard open field kick which was alertly recovered by the Alouettes' Marc-Antoine Dequoy who ended the game by conceding on the five-yard line to give Montreal the win.

Fajardo was named the Grey Cup Most Valuable Player and Philpot received the Dick Suderman Trophy for being the Most Valuable Canadian Player of the game.

=== Scoring summary ===
First quarter

WPG – FG Castillo 25 yards (8:32) 3–0 WPG
WPG – TD Oliveira 5-yard run (Castillo convert) (3:00) 10–0 WPG
MTL – TD Stanback 32-yard run (Côté convert) (0:00) 10–7 WPG

Second quarter

WPG – TD Prukop 1-yard run (Castillo convert) (2:52) 17–7 WPG

Third quarter

MTL – TD Spieker 23-yard reception from Fajardo (Côté convert) (13:17) 17–14 WPG

Fourth quarter

MTL – TD Mack 13-yard reception from Fajardo (Côté convert) (11:12) 21–17 MTL
WPG – TD Prukop 4-yard run (Castillo convert) (5:28) 24–21 WPG
MTL – TD Philpot 19-yard reception from Fajardo (Côté convert) (00:13) 28–24 MTL

=== Individual statistics ===
Sources: CFL 110th Grey Cup Boxscore

Alouettes passing
Player	CP/AT	Pct	Yards	TD	Int
(United States) Cody Fajardo	21/26	80.8%	290	3	1
Alouettes rushing
Player	Car	Yards	Avg	Lg	TD
(United States) William Stanback	9	68	7.6	32	1
(United States) Cody Fajardo	2	18	9.0	13	0
(United States) Caleb Evans	5	14	2.8	7	0
Alouettes receiving
Player	Rec	Yards	Avg	Lg	TD
(United States) Austin Mack	6	103	17.2	33	1
(Canada) Tyson Philpot	6	63	10.5	19	1
(United States) Cole Spieker	3	62	20.7	31	1
(United States) Tyler Snead	4	51	12.8	23	0
(Canada) James Tuck	1	8	8.0	8	0
(Canada) Jeshrun Antwi	1	3	3.0	3	0
Alouettes defence
Player	DT–ST	QS	Int	FR	FF
(United States) Darnell Sankey	8–0	1	0	0	0
(United States) Tyrice Beverette	7–1	0	0	0	0
(United States) Wesley Sutton	6–1	0	0	0	0
(United States) Reggie Stubblefield	5–0	1	0	0	0
(Canada) Lwal Uguak	5–0	0	0	0	0
(United States) Avery Ellis	3–1	0	0	0	0
(United States) Mustafa Johnson	3–0	1	0	0	0
(United States) Shawn Lemon	3–0	1	0	0	0
(United States) Almondo Sewell	2–0	0	0	0	0
(United States) Avery Williams	2–1	0	0	0	0
(Canada) Marc-Antoine Dequoy	1–0	0	0	0	0
(United States) Dionté Ruffin	1–0	0	0	0	0
(United States) Austin Mack	1–0	0	0	0	0
(United States) Kabion Ento	1–0	0	1	0	1
(United States) Ciante Evans	1–0	0	0	1	0
(Canada) Frédéric Chagnon	0–2	0	0	0	0
(Canada) Louis-Philippe Bourassa	0–1	0	0	0	0
(Canada) Alexandre Gagné	0–1	0	0	0	0
(Canada) Tyrell Richards	0–1	0	0	0	0
Alouettes placekicking
Player	FM–FA	Lng	Avg	Sng	CM-CA
(Canada) David Côté	0–0	—	—	0	4–4
Alouettes punting
Player	No	GAv	NAv	Sng	Lng
(Australia) Joseph Zema	5	35.6	—	0	61
Alouettes punt returns
Player	PR	Yards	Avg	Lg	TD
(Canada) Tyson Philpot	3	49	16.3	30	0
(United States) James Letcher Jr.	2	−5	−2.5	7	0
Alouettes kickoff returns
Player	PR	Yards	Avg	Lg	TD
(United States) James Letcher Jr.	3	77	25.7	32	0
(Canada) Tyson Philpot	1	14	14.0	14	0

Blue Bombers passing
Player	CP/AT	Pct	Yards	TD	Int
(United States) Zach Collaros	19/23	82.6%	236	0	1
Blue Bombers rushing
Player	Car	Yards	Avg	Lg	TD
(Canada) Brady Oliveira	19	119	6.3	14	1
(United States) Dakota Prukop	9	33	3.7	8	2
(United States) Zach Collaros	1	4	4.0	4	0
(Canada) Nic Demski	2	1	0.5	2	0
Blue Bombers receiving
Player	Rec	Yards	Avg	Lg	TD
(United States) Kenny Lawler	3	77	25.7	42	0
(Canada) Nic Demski	8	74	9.3	18	0
(United States) Dalton Schoen	3	36	12.0	15	0
(United States) Rasheed Bailey	2	18	9.0	10	0
(Australia) Jamieson Sheahan	1	14	14.0	14	0
(Canada) Drew Wolitarsky	1	9	9.0	9	0
(Canada) Brady Oliveira	1	8	8.0	8	0
Blue Bombers defence
Player	DT–ST	QS	Int	FR	FF
(United States) Evan Holm	7–0	0	1	0	0
(Canada) Shayne Gauthier	5–0	1	0	0	0
(United States) Demerio Houston	3–0	0	0	0	0
(Canada) Jake Thomas	3–0	0	0	0	0
(United States) Brandon Alexander	3–0	0	0	0	1
(United States) Jamal Parker	2–1	0	0	0	0
(United States) Deatrick Nichols	2–0	0	0	0	0
(United States) Kyrie Wilson	2–0	0	0	0	0
(Canada) Redha Kramdi	2–0	0	0	0	0
(Canada) Drew Wolitarsky	1–0	0	0	0	0
(United States) Willie Jefferson	1–0	1	0	0	0
(United States) Ricky Walker	1–0	0	0	0	0
(United States) Jackson Jeffcoat	1–0	0	0	0	0
(United States) Adam Bighill	1–0	0	0	0	0
(United States) Kenny Lawler	1–0	0	0	0	0
(United States) Malik Clements	0–2	0	0	0	0
(Canada) Tanner Cadwallader	0–2	0	0	0	0
(Canada) Nick Hallett	0–2	0	0	0	0
(Canada) Mike Benson	0–1	0	0	1	0
Blue Bombers placekicking
Player	FM–FA	Lng	Avg	Sng	CM-CA
(United States) Sergio Castillo	1–1	25	25.0	0	3–3
Blue Bombers punting
Player	No	GAv	NAv	Sng	Lng
(Australia) Jamieson Sheahan	5	40.4	—	0	49
Blue Bombers punt returns
Player	PR	Yards	Avg	Lg	TD
(United States) Janarion Grant	3	23	7.7	9	0
Blue Bombers kickoff returns
Player	PR	Yards	Avg	Lg	TD
(United States) Janarion Grant	5	119	23.8	39	0

== Depth charts ==
The following diagrams illustrate the teams' depth charts that were released one day prior to game day. Starters are listed in boxes in their respective positions with backups listed directly above or below. As per CFL rules, 45 of the 46 players for each team would dress in the game.

=== Montreal Alouettes ===
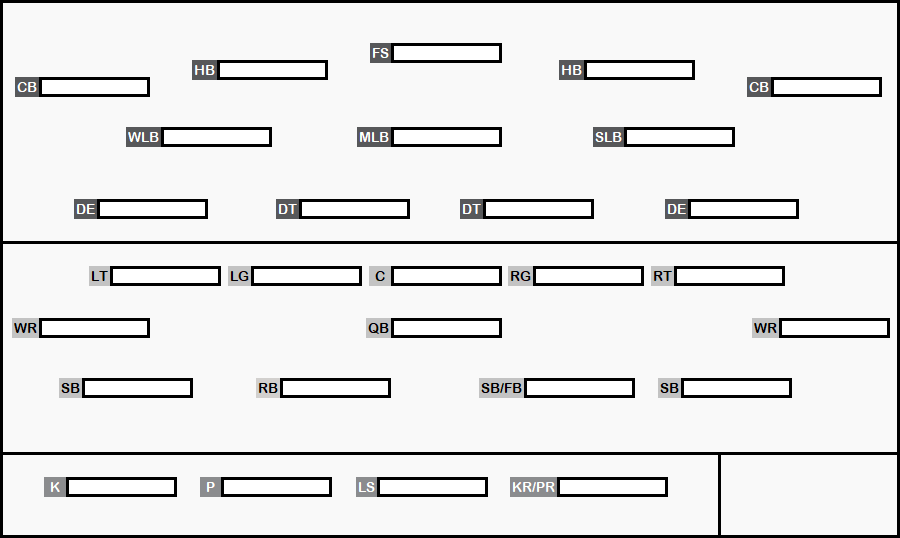

=== Winnipeg Blue Bombers ===
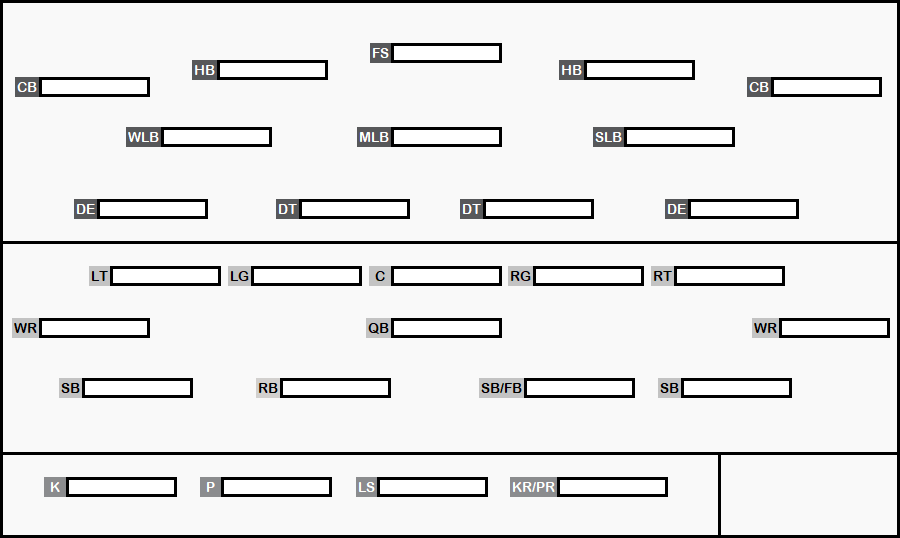

== Officials ==
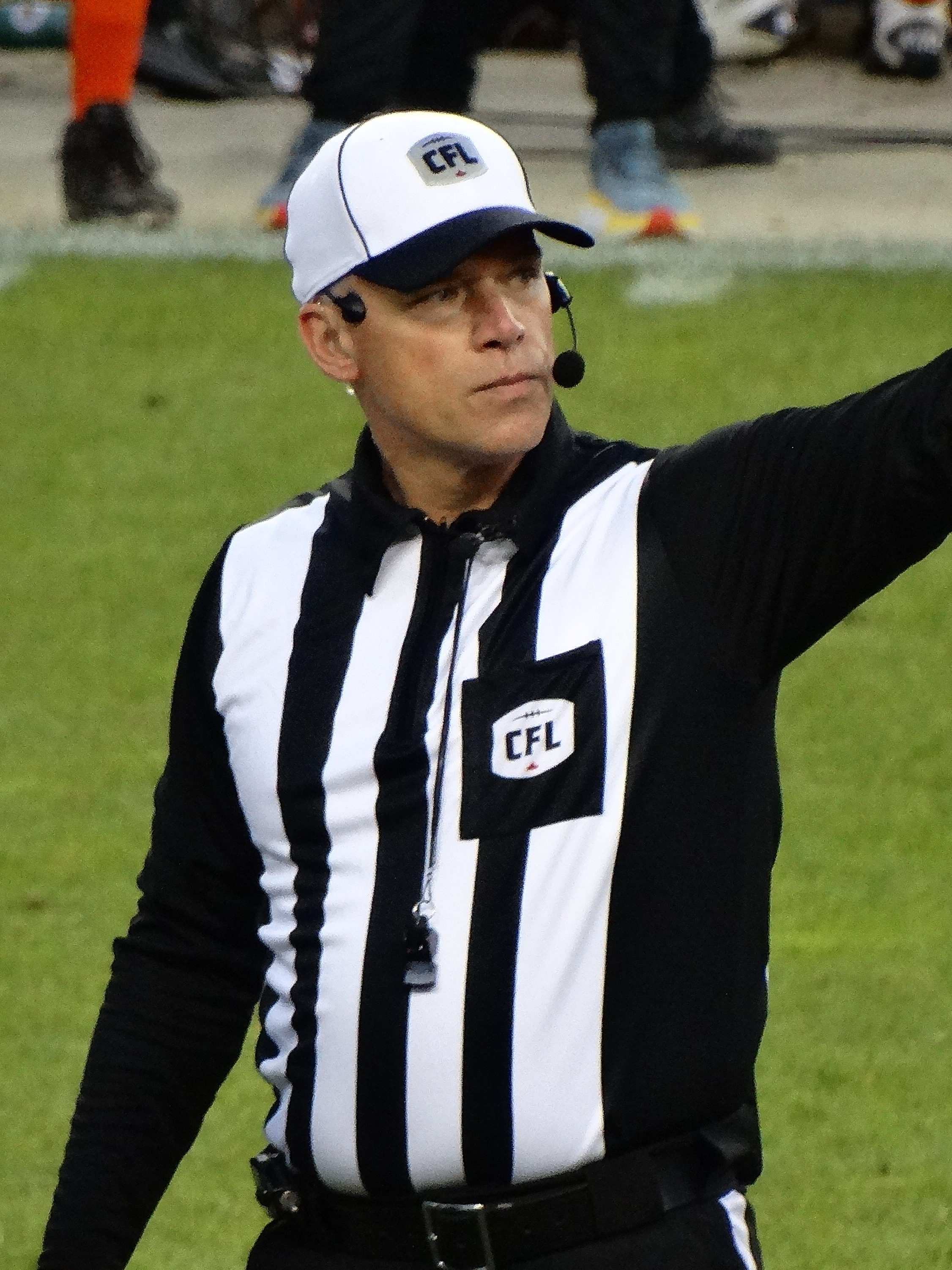
Tim Kroeker officiated his sixth Grey Cup and first as a referee.

The highest-rated officials during the 2023 CFL season from their respective positions were selected for the game and announced on November 15, 2023. The numbers below indicate their uniform numbers.

- Referee: No. 74 Tim Kroeker
- Umpire: No. 24 Troy Semenchuk
- Down Judge: No. 27 Andrew Wakefield
- Line Judge: No. 63 Rob Hill
- Side Judge: No. 18 Pierre Laporte
- Back Judge: No. 59 Larry Butler
- Field Judge: No. 37 Jason Maggio
- Backup Referee: No. 60 Tom Vallesi
- Backup Official: No. 19 Chris Shapka
- Backup Official: No. 40 Kevin Riopel
- Backup Official: No. 73 Brian Chrupalo
