= 2026 Montreal Alouettes season =

CFL team season

- General manager: Danny Maciocia
- Head coach: Jason Maas
- Home stadium: Percival Molson Memorial Stadium

Results
- Record: 14–4
- Division place: 1st, East
- Playoffs: Lost Grey Cup
- Team MOP: Davis Alexander
- Team MODP: Tyrice Beverette
- Team MOC: Tyson Philpot
- Team MOOL: Donald Ventrelli
- Team MOST: José Maltos Díaz
- Team MOR: Jonathan Sutherland

Uniform
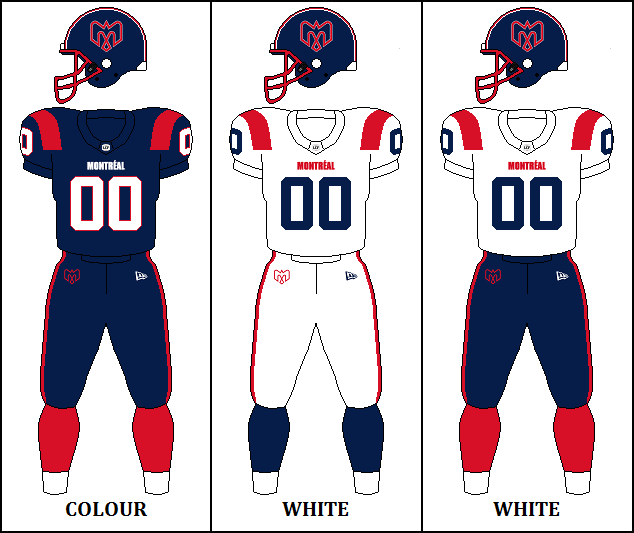

The 2026 Montreal Alouettes season was the 59th season for the team in the Canadian Football League (CFL) and their 71st overall. The Alouettes qualified for the playoffs for the seventh consecutive season and clinched a home playoff game for the fifth straight season after they defeated the BC Lions on September 4, 2026. The Alouettes attempted to win their ninth Grey Cup championship, but lost in the final to the Edmonton Elks.

The 2026 CFL season was the fourth season with Jason Maas as the team's head coach and the sixth season with Danny Maciocia as the team's general manager.

The Montreal Alouettes drew an average home attendance of 21,192 in 2026.

== Offseason ==
=== CFL Canadian draft ===
The 2026 CFL draft took place on April 28, 2026. The Alouettes had eight selections in the eight-round draft. Not including traded picks or forfeitures, the team selected eighth in each round of the draft after losing the 112th Grey Cup.

Round	Pick	Player	Position	School
1	8	Rohan Jones	TE	Arkansas
2	17	Shakespeare Louis	DB	Southeastern Louisiana
3	28	Nathan Udoh	WR	Manitoba
4	37	Liam Talbot	RB	Windsor
5	46	Harrison Daley	DB	Windsor
6	55	Michael Horvat	K	McMaster
7	64	Cyrus McGarrell	DB	Northern Illinois
8	73	Zachary Houde	WR	St. Francis Xavier

=== CFL global draft ===
The 2026 CFL global draft took place on April 29, 2026. The Alouettes had two selections in the draft, holding the eighth pick in each round.

Round	Pick	Player	Position	School	Nationality
1	8	Mark Petry	OL	Syracuse	Germany
2	17	Jack Burgess	P	Texas Tech	Australia

== Preseason ==
=== Schedule ===
Week	Game	Date	Kickoff	Opponent	Results		TV	Venue	Attendance	Summary
Week	Game	Date	Kickoff	Opponent	Score	Record	TV	Venue	Attendance	Summary
A	Bye									
B	1	Fri, May 22	7:00 p.m. EDT	vs. Ottawa Redblacks	L 12–27	0–1	RDS	Molson Stadium	N/A	Recap
C	2	Fri, May 29	7:00 p.m. EDT	at Ottawa Redblacks	L 3–27	0–2	TSN2/RDS	TD Place Stadium	N/A	Recap

# Games played with white uniforms.

== Regular season ==
=== Standings ===
East Division
Team	GP	W	L	Pts	PF	PA	Div	Stk	
Montreal Alouettes	18	14	4	28	624	476	8–0	W1	Details
Toronto Argonauts	18	9	9	18	517	528	4–4	L3	Details
Hamilton Tiger-Cats	18	6	12	12	443	523	3–5	W1	Details
Ottawa Redblacks	18	1	17	2	437	673	1–7	L1	Details

=== Schedule ===
Week	Game	Date	Kickoff	Opponent	Results		TV	Venue	Attendance	Summary
Week	Game	Date	Kickoff	Opponent	Score	Record	TV	Venue	Attendance	Summary
1	1	Thu, June 4	7:30 p.m. EDT	at Hamilton Tiger-Cats	W 30–27 (OT)	1–0	TSN/RDS/CBSSN	Hamilton Stadium	18,577	Recap
2	2	Fri, June 12	7:00 p.m. EDT	vs. Toronto Argonauts	W 37–30	2–0	TSN/RDS	Molson Stadium	21,106	Recap
3	3	Sat, June 20	4:00 p.m. EDT	at Edmonton Elks	L 29–32 (OT)	2–1	TSN/RDS	Commonwealth Stadium	14,664	Recap
4	4	Sun, June 28	7:00 p.m. EDT	vs. Ottawa Redblacks	W 37–35	3–1	TSN/RDS/CBSSN	Molson Stadium	17,138	Recap
5	Bye									
6	5	Sat, July 11	7:00 p.m. EDT	vs. Calgary Stampeders	W 37–30	4–1	TSN/RDS/CBSSN	Molson Stadium	18,046	Recap
7	6	Sat, July 18	4:00 p.m. EDT	at Calgary Stampeders	W 38–32	5–1	TSN/RDS	McMahon Stadium	19,228	Recap
8	7	Sun, Jul 26	7:00 p.m. EDT	vs. Hamilton Tiger-Cats	W 31–18	6–1	TSN/RDS/CBSSN	Molson Stadium	21,014	Recap
9	8	Fri, Jul 31	7:30 p.m. EDT	at Ottawa Redblacks	W 34–13	7–1	TSN/RDS/CBSSN	TD Place Stadium	17,336	Recap
10	9	Sat, Aug 8	3:00 p.m. EDT	vs. Edmonton Elks	W 48–30	8–1	TSN/RDS	Molson Stadium	22,535	Recap
11	Bye									
12	10	Thu, Aug 20	7:30 p.m. EDT	vs. Ottawa Redblacks	W 46–16	9–1	TSN/RDS/CBSSN	Molson Stadium	22,482	Recap
13	11	Fri, Aug 28	8:30 p.m. EDT	at Winnipeg Blue Bombers	L 28–44	9–2	TSN/RDS	Princess Auto Stadium	32,343	Recap
14	12	Fri, Sept 4	7:30 p.m. EDT	vs. BC Lions	W 37–30	10–2	TSN/RDS	Molson Stadium	22,752	Recap
15	13	Sat, Sept 12	10:00 p.m. EDT	at BC Lions	L 29–48	10–3	TSN	BC Place	23,380	Recap
16	14	Fri, Sept 18	7:30 p.m. EDT	at Hamilton Tiger-Cats	W 37–25	11–3	TSN/RDS/CBSSN	Hamilton Stadium	18,078	Recap
17	Bye									
18	15	Sat, Oct 3	7:00 p.m. EDT	vs. Winnipeg Blue Bombers	W 37–10	12–3	TSN/RDS	Molson Stadium	23,035	Recap
19	16	Mon, Oct 12	1:00 p.m. EDT	vs. Saskatchewan Roughriders	W 44–24	13–3	TSN/RDS/CBSSN	Molson Stadium	23,035	Recap
20	17	Sat, Oct 17	3:00 p.m. EDT	at Saskatchewan Roughriders	L 12–16	13–4	TSN/RDS/CTV	Mosaic Stadium	28,611	Recap
21	18	Fri, Oct 23	7:00 p.m. EDT	at Toronto Argonauts	W 33–16	14–4	TSN	BMO Field	13,198	Recap

# Games played with blue uniforms.
# Games played with white uniforms.

== Post-season ==
=== Schedule ===
Game	Date	Kickoff	Opponent	Results		TV	Venue	Attendance	Summary
Game	Date	Kickoff	Opponent	Score	Record	TV	Venue	Attendance	Summary
East Semi-Final	Sat, Oct 31	Bye							
East Final	Sat, Nov 7	3:00 p.m. EST	vs. Winnipeg Blue Bombers	W 33–23	1–0	TSN/CTV/RDS	Molson Stadium	23,035	Recap
113th Grey Cup	Sun, Nov 15	6:00 p.m. EST	Edmonton Elks	L 30–37	1–1	TSN/CTV/RDS	McMahon Stadium	32,419	Recap

# Games played with blue uniforms.
# Games played with white uniforms.

== Team ==
=== Roster ===
Montreal Alouettes roster
**Quarterbacks**: 10 Davis Alexander; 16 Dustin Crum; 18 Caleb Evans; **Receivers**: 82 Kaseem Ferdinand; 11 Rohan Jones; 83 Mekhi Mews WR/KR; 6 Tyson Philpot; 4 Charleston Rambo; 85 Tyler Snead; 17 Cole Spieker; 89 Jerreth Sterns; **Running backs**: 8 Stevie Scott III; **Fullbacks**: 39 David Dallaire; 38 Jacob Mason	**Offensive linemen**: 62 Nick Callender; 65 Sage Doxtater; 59 Cyrille Hogan-Saindon; 54 Justin Lawrence; 66 Pier-Olivier Lestage; 52 Tiger Shanks; 68 Donny Ventrelli; **Defensive linemen**: 91 Isaac Adeyemi-Berglund; 97 Joshua Archibald; 25 Julian Howsare; 94 Mustafa Johnson; 96 Lwal Uguak; 95 Daniel Wise; 98 Dylan Wynn	**Linebackers**: 2 Micah Awe; 26 Tyrice Beverette; 9 Geoffrey Cantin-Arku; 34 Alexandre Gagné; 41 Riley MacLeod; **Defensive backs**: 23 Nate Beauchemin; 20 Lorenzo Burns; 21 Don Callis; 48 Kabion Ento; 1 Robert Kennedy; 22 Shakespeare Louis; 12 Najee Murray; 0 Jonathan Sutherland; 37 Wesley Sutton; **Special teams**: 50 Louis-Philippe Bourassa LS; 19 José Maltos Díaz K; 36 Joseph Zema P	**Reserve**: 93 Bryce Ganious DL; 60 Des Holmes OL; **1-game Injured**: 29 Neil Campbell DB; 3 Régis Cibasu WR; 7 Devonte Dedmon WR; 88 Marco Dubois WR; 64 Reuben Fatheree II OL; 31 Faion Hicks DB; 15 Alexander Hollins WR; 35 Shomari Lawrence RB; 49 Gabriel Lessard LB; 42 Tyrell Richards LB; 30 Liam Talbot RB; 5 Travis Theis RB; **6-game injured**: 55 Braydon Noll OL	**Practice roster**: 40 Ty Anderson DL; 81 Cortez Braham Jr. WR; 79 Jack Burgess P; 43 Gemon Green DB; 44 Kylan Guidry DL; 47 T. J. Guy DL; 90 Decarius Hawthorne DL; 46 Donovan Manuel LB; 99 David Perales DL; 45 Quinn Urwiler LB; 53 Anthony Vandal OL; 71 Lewis Ward K; 14 Terry Wilson QB; **Suspended**: 41 Cameron Brown; -- Jarrett Horst; 31 Keanu Yazbeck
Italics indicate American player • **Bold** indicates Global player • 45 Roster, 2 Reserve, 13 Injured, 13 Practice, 3 Suspended; Roster updated 2026-11-14 • Depth chart • Transactions • More CFL rosters

=== Coaching staff ===
Montreal Alouettes staff
**Front office**: Owner – Pierre Karl Péladeau; President & CEO – Mark Weightman; General manager – Danny Maciocia; Assistant General Manager – Pier-Yves Lavergne; Assistant to the General Manager and Player Personnel – Marcel Desjardins; Senior Personnel Executive – Jean-Marc Edmé; Director of Player Personnel – Byron Archambault; Director of Football Operations – Allyson Sobol; Scout – Rob McIntyre; Head Video Coordinator – Rico Morotti; **Head coaches**: Head coach – Jason Maas; Assistant Head Coach/Special Teams Coordinator – Byron Archambault; **Offensive coaches**: Offensive Coordinator & Quarterbacks – Anthony Calvillo; Offensive Line – David Brown; Receivers & Pass Game Coordinator – Michael Lionello; Running Backs & Tight Ends – Dave Jackson; Offensive Assistant – Domenico Manno	**Defensive coaches**: Defensive Coordinator & Defensive Backs – Noel Thorpe; Linebackers – A. J. Gass; Defensive Line – Corvey Irvin; Defensive Assistant – Bryan Wyllie; **Staff**: Equipment Manager – David Deschamps; Head Athletic Therapist – Tristan Castonguay; Assistant Athletic Therapist - Dillon Warren; → Coaching Staff → More CFL staffs
