= Cole Spieker =

American gridiron football player (born 1996)

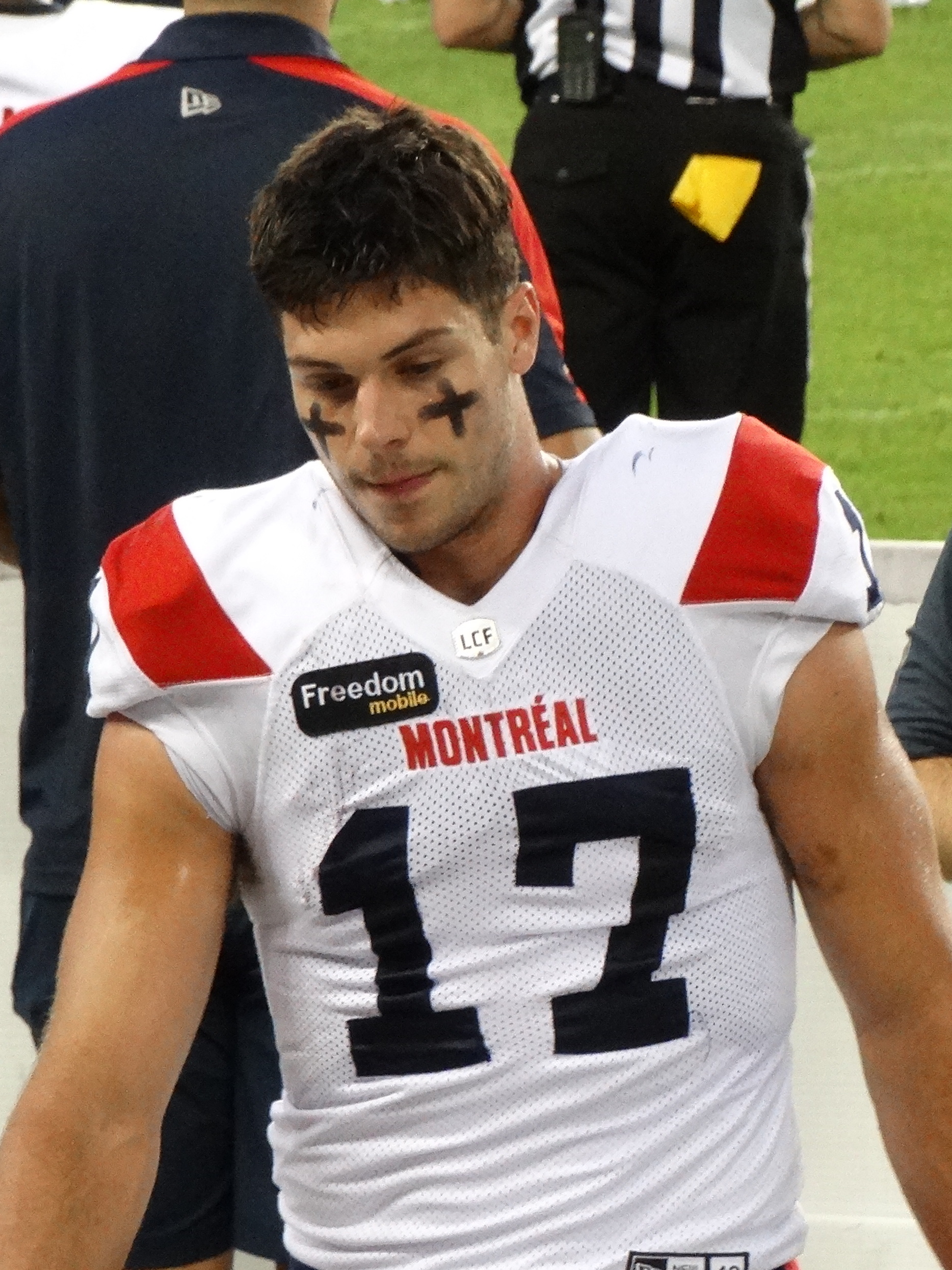
- Spieker with the Montreal Alouettes in 2024

No. 17 – Montreal Alouettes
- Position: Wide receiver
- Roster status: Active
- CFL status: American

Personal information
- Born: September 29, 1996 (age 30); Brainerd, Minnesota, U. S.
- Listed height: 6 ft 2 in (1.88 m)
- Listed weight: 215 lb (98 kg)

Career information
- College: Wisconsin–La Crosse

Career history
- Montreal Alouettes (2022–present)

Awards and highlights
- Grey Cup champion (2023); WIAC Offensive Player of the Year (2018); 2× First-team All-WIAC (2018, 2019); Second-team All-WIAC (2017)
- Stats at CFL.ca

Cole Spieker (born September 29, 1996) is an American professional football wide receiver for the Montreal Alouettes of the Canadian Football League (CFL).

== College career ==
Spieker played college football for the Wisconsin–La Crosse Eagles from 2017 to 2019.

== Professional career ==
Spieker went undrafted in the 2020 NFL draft, and his individual team workouts were canceled due to the COVID-19 pandemic. He subsequently began working an overnight job loading trucks for UPS in Madison, Wisconsin. In 2021, he attended eight NFL workouts without signing with a team. He then played for the Conquerors during the 2021 The Spring League season, recording 17 receptions for 217 yards and two touchdowns in six games. In the spring of 2022, Spieker attended a tryout camp for the Montreal Alouettes in Dallas, Texas, where he earned a contract. Reflecting on the opportunity, Spieker said, "I knew I had to ball out or it was time to move on." On May 3, 2022, the Alouettes announced that they had signed Spieker. Following training camp, he began the 2022 season on the practice roster.

He was elevated to the active roster and dressed for the final two games of the regular season against the Toronto Argonauts. In the season finale, he made his first career start. On the Alouettes' opening drive, Spieker caught his first CFL pass, a 53-yard touchdown reception from Dominique Davis. He finished the game with six receptions for 105 yards and a touchdown in the 38–33 victory. He was elevated to the postseason active roster due to an illness to wide receiver Hergy Mayala and appeared in the East Final against Toronto, where he recorded four receptions for 66 yards in the 34–27 loss.

In 2023, he returned to the Aloutettes. He finished the season having appeared in 12 regular season games, including 10 starts, recording 33 receptions for 389 yards and one touchdown. In the 110th Grey Cup against the Winnipeg Blue Bombers, Spieker caught a 23-yard touchdown pass from quarterback Cody Fajardo in the third quarter to cut the deficit to 17–14. Trailing 24–21 in the fourth quarter with under a minute remaining, Spieker recorded a 31-yard reception on the Alouettes' potential final offensive play on third-and-five. The next play, Fajardo connected with Tyson Philpot for the game-winning touchdown as the Alouettes won 28–24. During the Alouettes' postseason run, Spieker recorded four receptions for 74 yards, including three receptions for 62 yards and a touchdown in the 110th Grey Cup, earning his first Grey Cup championship.

In Week 4 of the 2024 season, Spieker recorded his first 100-yard receiving game of the season in a 30–20 victory over the Toronto Argonauts, finishing with eight receptions for 113 yards and a 44-yard touchdown. In Week 12, Spieker recorded the first multi-touchdown game of his career, both from Fajardo, in a 21–17 victory over the Edmonton Elks, including the go-ahead touchdown. On October 1, 2024, during the Alouettes' bye week in Week 18, Spieker signed a contract extension with the Montreal Alouettes through the 2026 season. He appeared in and started all 18 games, recording career highs with 58 receptions for 823 yards and seven touchdowns. In the East Final against Toronto, he recorded five receptions for 65 yards in the Alouettes' 30–28 loss.

In Week 7 of the 2025 season, Spieker recorded a career-high 129 receiving yards on nine receptions and a touchdown in a 26–25 victory over the Toronto Argonauts. He appeared in and started 16 games during the regular season, recording 54 receptions for 609 yards and four touchdowns. He also started all three postseason games, including the 112th Grey Cup against the Saskatchewan Roughriders, where he recorded three receptions for 24 yards in the 25–17 loss. During the postseason, he finished with five receptions for 36 yards.

In the 2026 season opener against the Hamilton Tiger-Cats, Spieker sustained an ankle injury and was placed on the six-game injured list. Upon his return in Week 7 against the Calgary Stampeders, he recorded four receptions for 73 yards and a touchdown in a 38–32 victory. In Week 9 against the Ottawa Redblacks, he recorded two receptions for 17 yards and two touchdowns in a victory.

== Career statistics ==
Legend
	Won the Grey Cup
**Bold**	Career high

=== Regular season ===
Year	Team	Games		Receiving			
Year	Team	GP	GS	Rec	Yds	Avg	TD
2022	MTL	2	1	6	105	**17.5**	1
2023	MTL	12	10	33	389	11.8	1
2024	MTL	18	18	**58**	**823**	14.2	**7**
2025	MTL	16	16	54	609	11.3	4
2026	MTL	6	6	20	298	14.9	3
CFL career		54	51	171	2,224	13.0	16

=== Postseason ===
Year	Team	Games		Receiving			
Year	Team	GP	GS	Rec	Yds	Avg	TD
2022	MTL	1	1	4	66	16.5	0
2023	MTL	3	3	4	**74**	**18.5**	**1**
2024	MTL	1	1	**5**	65	13.0	0
2025	MTL	3	3	**5**	36	7.2	0
CFL career		8	8	18	241	13.4	1

=== College ===
Year	Team	Games		Receiving				Rushing			
Year	Team	GP	GS	Rec	Yds	Avg	TD	Att	Yds	Avg	TD
2015	Wisconsin–La Crosse	Redshirted (redshirt)									
2016	Wisconsin–La Crosse	DNP (Not with team)									
2017	Wisconsin–La Crosse	10	6	19	255	13.4	4	5	24	4.8	0
2018	Wisconsin–La Crosse	10	10	42	867	**20.6**	10	1	2	2.0	0
2019	Wisconsin–La Crosse	10	10	**83**	**1,216**	14.7	**12**	**11**	**71**	**6.5**	**1**
Career		30	26	144	2,338	16.2	26	17	97	5.7	1
