= Gorman Kennedy =

Canadian journalist

- Born: June 5, 1908
- Died: December 25, 1974 (aged 66); Montreal, Quebec, Canada
- Occupations: Journalist; Advertising executive CFL executive

William Gorman Kennedy (June 5, 1908 – December 25, 1974) was a Canadian journalist, advertising executive, and Canadian Football League executive who served as the General Manager of the Montreal Alouettes from 1957 to 1959.

Kennedy was a longtime reporter of ski conditions for the Montreal Herald and CFCF radio. In addition to reporting on ski conditions, Kennedy served as the president of the Canadian Amateur Ski Association and was the director of sales for Dow Breweries.

Kennedy succeeded Vic Obeck as Alouettes general manager in 1957 after Obeck resigned to accept the position of athletic director at New York University. In his three seasons as GM, the Alouettes had a 19–22–1 record and made the playoffs each year.

During Expo 67, Kennedy served as the fair's chief liaison officer in the United States. He died at the age of 66 in 1974 in Montreal.
