= Montreal Alouettes =

Canadian football team

Montreal Alouettes; Alouettes de Montréal
- Current season
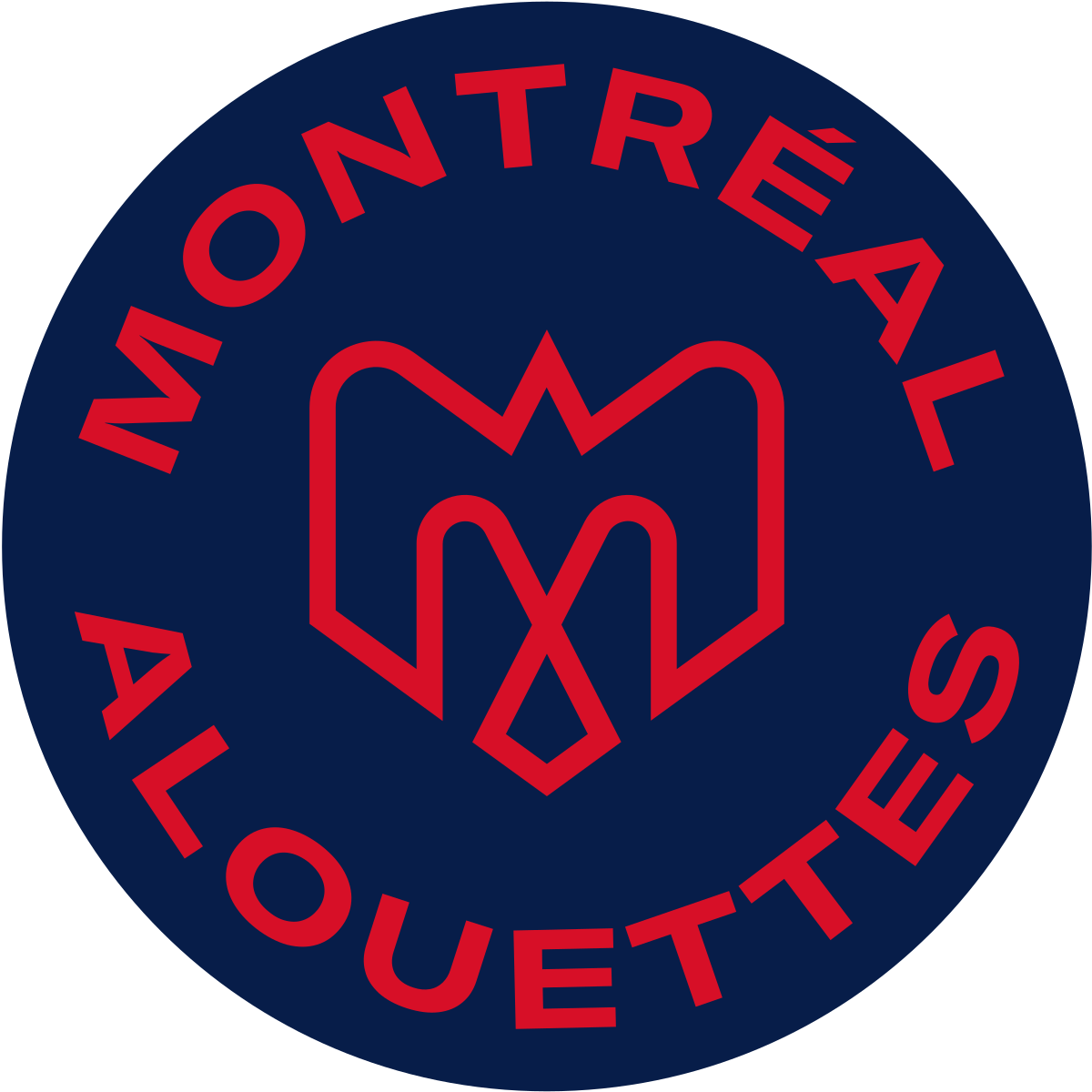
- Logo
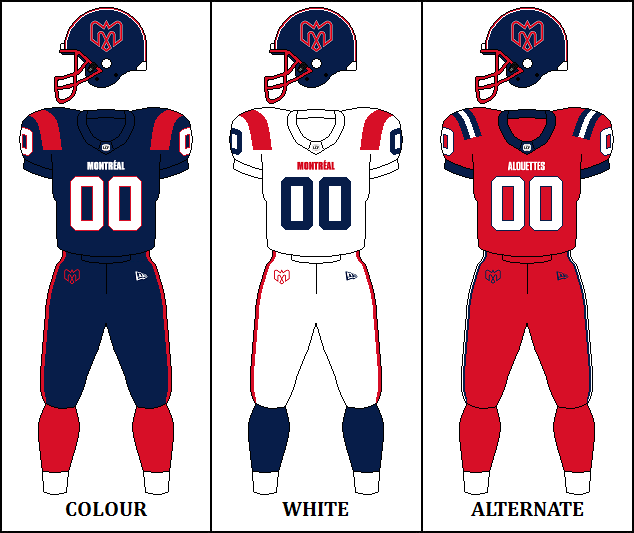
- Uniforms

General information
- Founded: 1946
- Stadium: Percival Molson Memorial Stadium
- Headquartered: Montreal, Quebec, Canada
- Colours: Red, white, blue
- Mascot: Touché
- Website: en.montrealalouettes.com (in English) montrealalouettes.com (in French)

Personnel
- Owner: Pierre Karl Péladeau
- General manager: Danny Maciocia
- Head coach: Jason Maas

Nicknames
- Als, Larks, Les Moineaux

Home fields
- Delorimier Stadium (1946–1953); Percival Molson Memorial Stadium (1947–1967, 1972, 1998–present); Autostade (1968–1971, 1973–1976); Olympic Stadium (1976–1986, 1996–1997, part-time 1998–2013)

League / conference affiliations
- Canadian Football League: East Division

Championships
- Grey Cup wins: 8 (1949, 1970, 1974, 1977, 2002, 2009, 2010, 2023)

The Montreal Alouettes (French: Les Alouettes de Montréal), colloquially known as the Als, are a professional Canadian football team based in Montreal. Founded in 1946, the team has disbanded and been re-established twice. The Alouettes compete in the East Division of the Canadian Football League (CFL) and last won the Grey Cup in 2023, defeating the Winnipeg Blue Bombers in the 110th Grey Cup. Their home field is Percival Molson Memorial Stadium for the regular season and as of 2014 also home of their playoff games.

The original Alouettes team (1946–1981) won the Grey Cup four times and were particularly dominant in the 1970s; appearing in six Grey Cup Finals through that decade, they won in 1970, 1974 and 1977, while losing in 1975, 1978 and 1979 (all against the Edmonton Eskimos). After their collapse in 1982, they were immediately reconstituted under new ownership as the Montreal Concordes. After playing for four years as the Concordes, they revived the Alouettes name for the 1986 season. A second folding in 1987 led to a nine-year hiatus of CFL football in the city.

The current Alouettes franchise was established in 1996 by the owner of the Baltimore Stallions. The Stallions were disbanded at the same time as the Alouettes' re-establishment after having been the most successful of the CFL's American expansion franchises, culminating in a Grey Cup championship in 1995. Many players from the Stallions' 1995 roster signed with the Alouettes and formed the core of the team's 1996 roster.

For record-keeping purposes, the CFL considers all clubs that have played in Montreal as one franchise dating to 1946 and considers the Alouettes to have suspended operations in 1987 before returning in 1996. Although the Alouettes' re-establishment in 1996 is often considered a relocation of the Stallions, neither the league nor the Alouettes recognize the Baltimore franchise, or its records, as part of the Alouettes' official team history.

The latest incarnation of the Alouettes were arguably the best CFL team of the 2000s; they acceded to all but three Grey Cup Finals of the decade, taking home three Grey Cups in the process and bringing the franchise total to seven. The Alouettes had from 1996 to 2014 the CFL's longest active playoff streak, only having missed the playoffs three times since returning to the league. The streak came to an end in 2015. They have hosted a playoff game every year except 2001, 2007, 2013, and from 2015 to 2018. Their five losing seasons came in 2007, 2013 and from 2015 to 2018. The 2015 through 2018 Alouettes' seasons marked the first time the team missed the playoffs in consecutive years since their re-activation. Major stars of the recent era include Mike Pringle, the CFL career leader in rushing yards, and quarterback Anthony Calvillo, who led all of pro football in career passing yards before Drew Brees took over in late 2020.

In 2019 the CFL purchased the team from American businessman Robert Wetenhall, who could not find a buyer. Later that year the Alouettes were acquired by Crawford Steel executives Sid Spiegel and his son-in-law Gary Stern (through their subsidiary S and S Sportsco), who took over the team on January 6, 2020. In February 2023, the ownership was passed back to the league, which subsequently agreed to sell the team to Quebec media mogul and former Parti Québécois leader Pierre Karl Péladeau in March of that year. On November 19, 2023, the Alouettes won their eighth Grey Cup in their first season under Péladeau's ownership.

== History ==
=== Original Alouettes (1946–1981) ===
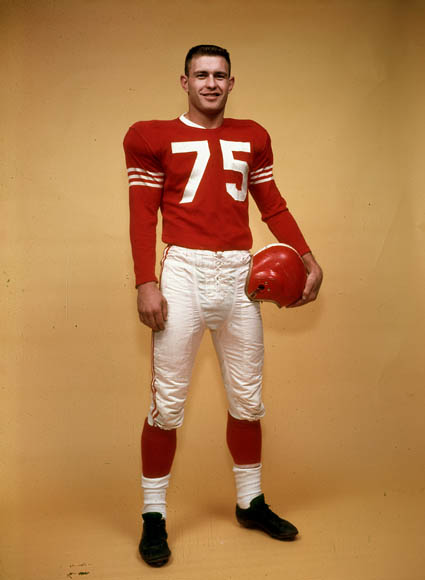
"Prince" Hal Patterson in a 1958 Alouettes uniform.

Canadian football has a long history in Montreal, dating to the 1850s. The Alouettes were first formed in 1946 by Canadian Football Hall of Famer Lew Hayman along with stockbroker Eric Cradock and former Montreal Canadiens part-owner Léo Dandurand. They named themselves after "Alouette", a work song about plucking the feathers from a skylark, which had become a symbol of the Québécois. The origin of the team's name also comes from the Second World War-era No. 425 "Alouette" Squadron, a bomber squadron operating out of North Africa and later Yorkshire, England. 425 Squadron was also the Royal Canadian Air Force's primarily French-Canadian squadron. They won their first Grey Cup championship in 1949, beating the Calgary Stampeders 28–15 led by quarterback Frank Filchock and running back Virgil Wagner.

The 1950s were a productive decade for the Als, with quarterback Sam Etcheverry throwing passes to John "Red" O'Quinn, "Prince" Hal Patterson, and with Pat Abbruzzi carrying the ball, Montreal fielded the most dangerous offence in all Canadian football. From 1954 to 1956, they reached the Grey Cup in three consecutive seasons, but questionable defensive units led the Alouettes to defeat versus the Edmonton Eskimos each time.

The team was purchased in 1954 by Ted Workman. Like all teams playing in the WIFU and IRFU, the Alouettes joined the newly-formed Canadian Football League in 1958. While the team continued to enjoy success for the rest of the 1950s, that all changed at the end of the 1960 season. To be more specific, the team was shaken by an announcement on November 10 – namely the trade of Hal Patterson and Sam Etcheverry to the Hamilton Tiger-Cats for Bernie Faloney and Don Paquette. Workman had concluded the deal without consulting with general manager Perry Moss. The deal quickly fell apart because Etcheverry had just signed a new contract with a no-trade clause; as a result, Etcheverry was now a free agent. The deal was reworked and Patterson was traded for Paquette. Sam Etcheverry went on to play in the NFL with the St. Louis Cardinals for 2 years (1961 and 1962) followed by the San Francisco 49ers in 1963. Faloney remained in Hamilton, and teamed with Patterson to form one of the most deadly quarterback-receiver combinations in CFL history.

This episode remains one of the most lopsided trades ever made in the Alouettes history, and it ushered in a dark decade for the team. During that time, they failed to register a single winning season. From 1968 to 1976 the team played in the Autostade stadium—which had been built as a temporary stadium for Expo 67. The stadium's less-than-desirable location on Montreal's waterfront near the Victoria Bridge led to dismal attendance, putting more strain on the team's finances.

Workman sold half the team to Joe Atwell in 1965. Atwell bought the remaining shares in 1967. The change in ownership failed to reverse the Als' slide. They finally bottomed out in 1969, finishing 2–12. After that season, Atwell sold the team to the highly capable Sam Berger, a former part-owner of the Ottawa Rough Riders. Berger made immediate changes to the team. On December 9, the team announced that Red O'Quinn and Sam Etcheverry were returning to the organization, this time as the team's new general manager and head coach, respectively. The team also unveiled new uniforms—their home jerseys were now predominantly green, with red and white trim. The white helmets with the red "wings" used during the 1960s also disappeared, replaced by a white helmet with a stylized green and red bird's head that formed a lower-case "a." As one might expect from a team that had won only two games in 1969, many new players were brought in.

The changes paid immediate dividends. Although the team finished third in the East, they defeated the Toronto Argonauts and the Hamilton Tiger-Cats in the playoffs. The 1970 season culminated when the Alouettes won the 58th Grey Cup, played on November 28 at Toronto's Exhibition Stadium before a crowd of 32,669. Led by quarterback Sonny Wade (who was named the game's most valuable player, and who would soon become a fan favourite in Montreal—not unlike the status his coach had enjoyed in the 1950s), halfback Moses Denson, receivers Gary Lefebvre and Tom Pullen, along with kicker George Springate, the team defeated the Calgary Stampeders 23–10 for the city's first Grey Cup since 1949, also against the Stamps.

That 1970 victory would herald the beginning of arguably the greatest decade in franchise history. During Berger's tenure as owner, the team played for six Grey Cups and won three (meeting both Alberta teams all of those times, and the Edmonton Eskimos in five of those six games). In 1974, the team changed their colours to match the other Montreal pro sports teams- red, white and blue. They finally moved out of the Autostade and into Olympic Stadium midway through the 1976 season and attendance shot up. In 1977, the Als had a very successful year both on the field and at the box office, winning the Grey Cup at their home field before a Grey Cup-record 68,318 fans (a CFL record that still stands as of 2023). They also averaged 59,595 fans per game at the "Big O" during the regular season, a league record that also still stands.

However, the success ended with Berger's retirement in 1981. He sold the team to Vancouver businessman Nelson Skalbania. The flamboyant Skalbania set about signing two first-round picks from the 1981 National Football League draft and NFL name players such as Vince Ferragamo, James Scott, David Overstreet, Keith Gary and Billy "White Shoes" Johnson. Even with all that talent, the Alouettes suffered on the field, finishing with a dismal 3–13 record while attendance plummeted to under 30,000 per game. However, the East was so weak that year (Hamilton was the only team in the East to finish with a winning record) that they actually made the playoffs, finishing third in the East ahead of the 2–14 Toronto Argonauts. In the East Semi-Final, they made a fairly good showing against the second place (and eventual East Division champions) Rough Riders before losing by a final score of 20–16.

This would be the last game that the original Alouettes franchise would play. Skalbania was reported late in 1981 to be selling to oil magnate Pat Bowlen, who would later buy the NFL's Denver Broncos in 1984. Later in 1981, NFL coach George Allen obtained an option to purchase 51% of the club and was named Alouettes' president. While holding both the option and the post, Allen was surprised by Skalbania arranging a sale of the same controlling stake to Harry Ornest, who would later own the St. Louis Blues and the Toronto Argonauts. Ornest was reluctant to take control of the Alouettes as a result of the team's high level of debt and extensive commitments to high-profile stars. In early April 1982, Allen looked set to take control of the Alouettes. However, Allen left the club in late April after Skalbania was unable to resolve 1981 debts. With the franchise in collapse, Berger tried to force Skalbania to relinquish the team to him as payment for debt. Skalbania returned from a business trip to Hong Kong in late April and was able to regain control of the team. However, Skalbania's highly leveraged business interests collapsed a month later. Unable to meet his obligations, he was forced to return the team to the league on May 13.

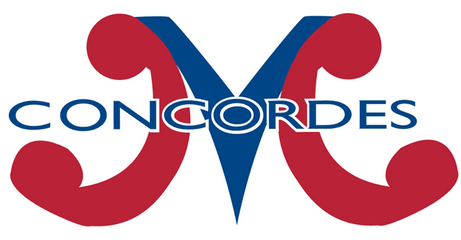
Montreal Concordes logo from 1982–1985

=== Montreal Concordes (1982–1985) ===
The CFL had anticipated the collapse of the Alouettes and was well prepared when Skalbania returned the franchise to the league. Among potential suitors for the troubled franchise was Montreal businessman Charles Bronfman, founder and owner of the Alouettes' co-tenants at the Big O, the Montreal Expos. Bronfman had made it clear to league officials that he would not deal with Skalbania, but would be willing to establish a replacement franchise on short notice if the Alouettes ceased operations. On May 14, 1982, a day after the original Alouettes franchise folded, the CFL granted the Montreal franchise rights to Bronfman. However, Skalbania continued to assert ownership of the Montreal Alouettes name, logos and related intellectual property even though he had given up the franchise.

Rather than risk a lawsuit from the notoriously litigious Skalbania, and unwilling to negotiate with him, Bronfman chose to create a team under another aviation-inspired name, the Concordes. The new name was not only a reference to the then-revolutionary Concorde supersonic passenger jet, but appeared to be an appeal to both anglophones and francophones; Concorde was an Anglo-French joint venture. Unfortunately, the new name angered management at one of Montreal's most prominent corporations, aviation manufacturer Bombardier. After being a prominent sponsor of the Alouettes, Bombardier refused to have anything to do with a football team named for an aircraft built by one of its competitors, the French-based Aérospatiale.

The Concordes inherited the franchise history and records of the 1946–1981 Alouettes, as well as the CFL rights of all Alouettes players. Bronfman retained most of the Alouettes' coaching staff, including recently hired head coach Joe Galat, and most of the Alouettes' front office personnel. In an effort to bring the team's expenses under control, Bronfmam released the former NFL players signed by Skalbania. While many players returned to the U.S., one factor working in Bronfman's favour was that a players' strike was looming in the NFL (which would last 57 days from September to November), which helped persuade star quarterback Johnny Evans and a few other Skalbania signees to stay in Montreal.

A nine-game losing streak to end the season doomed the 1982 Concordes to a 2–14 record – the worst record in franchise history (percentage points below the 1969 Als). The Concordes featured quarterback Luc Tousignant, the only Québécois quarterback to start a CFL game besides Gerry Dattilio. The club also featured star collegiate running back David Overstreet (a holdover from the 1981 Alouettes) who rushed for 190 yards in six games before ending his season on the injured reserve list. Other stars on the club included quarterback Johnny Evans, quarterback Turner Gill, slot back Nick Arakgi, running back Lester Brown, wide receiver Brian DeRoo, local kick returner Denny Ferdinand, defensive tackle Glen Weir, safety Preston Young, defensive end Gordon Judges, kicker-punter Don Sweet, and linebacker William Hampton.

The team slowly rebounded on the field over the next three years. The Concordes won five games in 1983. While still well below .500, the East Division was so weak that year (only the eventual Grey Cup champion Argos finished with a winning record) that the Concordes were still in playoff contention on the season's final weekend. The Concordes' final game of the season was at Olympic Stadium against the Tiger-Cats. With Hamilton and Montreal tied at 5–10 for the division's third and final playoff spot, a respectable crowd of 41,157 converged to watch the Concordes play what was effectively a playoff game. These fans left heartbroken after Hamilton kicker Bernie Ruoff made a last-minute field goal to tie the game 21–21. Since overtime would not be introduced in the CFL regular season until 1986, the Tiger-Cats won the final Eastern playoff berth on account of a better head-to-head record (having beaten the Concordes earlier in the year).

The team returned to the playoffs in 1984, again doing so in a very weak East Division; only the defending champion Argos finished with a winning record. In 1985, they advanced all the way to the East Final. Their East Semifinal win over Ottawa that year was both their only home playoff game and only playoff win under the Concordes banner; 1984 and 1985 were the only playoff appearances for the franchise from 1982 to 1986. However, as in 1984, they made the playoffs in an extremely weak East Division; the Concordes and Ti-Cats both finished with identical 8–8 records, with the Ti-Cats getting the division title by virtue of sweeping the season series. No other team in the division even managed a .500 record.

However, attendance did not keep pace with the team's performance. The Concordes' 1983 season finale against Hamilton was the only game to attract a crowd surpassing even 30,000 under Bronfman's ownership. Moreover, the 1985 East Semifinal was a disaster at the box office due in part to poor weather conditions and haphazard facility preparations. Only 11,372 fans attended what would turn out to be the team's last home game played under the Concordes name.

=== Re-branding and demise (1986–1987) ===
After quietly coming to terms with Skalbania, in 1986 the team attempted to embrace its predecessor's history and regenerate flagging fan interest by rebranding itself the "new" Montreal Alouettes. This would not prove to be successful, on or off the field. On the field, the team posted a 4–14 record, missing the playoffs in spite of once again finishing third in the East on account of the new "cross-over rule" the CFL had implemented for the 1986 season. Off the field, financial losses mounted and the team's attendance tumbled to 10,127 a game, including only 9,045 at the final home game (a contest against the BC Lions drew only 5200 fans, the smallest crowd at any CFL game since 1951).

Just before the 1987 season, Carling O'Keefe tore up its deal to serve as the CFL's presenting television sponsor. The collapse of the CFL's television deal proved a death blow for the Alouettes. The franchise had lost at least $15 million under Bronfman's ownership. While Bronfman was far better financed than Skalbania, he was unwilling to spend millions of dollars underwriting his professional sports holdings indefinitely. Bronfman's overall situation was not helped by the then-emerging news that his other professional sports team, the Expos, were at the centre of a massive collusion scandal that was rocking Major League Baseball. Eventually, Bronfman decided to focus on the Expos. He made it clear the Alouettes would not take the field for the 1987 CFL season unless they sold thousands of additional season tickets. Neither the necessary season ticket sales nor a viable ownership group willing to take the franchise off Bronfman's hands materialized.

With the collapse of the league's television deal leaving several other franchises in serious distress, the league was not in a position to take over operating the team. Re-location was not an option either even though several Canadian cities had expressed interest in acquiring a CFL team (with London, Ontario being briefly considered). Even notwithstanding the logistical challenges of moving a team on short notice, no prospective city had a stadium that was suitable even for temporary use. At the time, the CFL was lukewarm to the possibility of expanding or re-locating to U.S. markets (the CFL's U.S. expansion experiment did not come until six years later).

The Alouettes played both of their two preseason games on the road. However, Bronfman was at the end of his tether and folded the new Alouettes on June 24, 1987, just a day before the 1987 regular season started. The league had been well aware of this possibility for months, and immediately released a previously-drafted eight-team schedule. However, the Alouettes' demise came so late that the June 28 Washington Post still announced an ESPN broadcast of an Alouettes–Stampeders game, a game that would never be played. To balance out the divisions, the easternmost-West Division team, the Winnipeg Blue Bombers, moved to the East Division to take the Alouettes' place (along with this, the "cross-over rule" for the playoffs was scrapped until 1997).

The CFL held a dispersal draft for the Alouettes players. Some of the players left out of work by the team's demise (both on the Alouettes and players on other CFL teams who were cut to make room for former Alouettes) played in the NFL as replacement players during another players' strike later that year. During the period that the Alouettes were inactive, professional gridiron football would return to Montreal in the form of the NFL-created World League of American Football's Montreal Machine, who played two seasons in 1991 and 1992 under American rules.

=== Baltimore Stallions (1994–1995) ===
The Baltimore Football Club was granted an expansion franchise for 1994 by the Canadian Football League during their American expansion of the early-mid 1990s. After the NFL's Indianapolis Colts (who had moved from Baltimore in 1983) blocked attempts to name the new team the Baltimore CFL Colts, owner Jim Speros eventually settled on Stallions as a nickname. The Stallions were by far the most successful of the CFL's American teams, garnering strong fan support in the Baltimore area and appearing in the Grey Cup in both its seasons, losing in 1994 and winning in 1995. To date, they are the only American-based team to play for and win the Grey Cup. Only a week before the Stallions won the Grey Cup, Cleveland Browns owner Art Modell announced his intention to relocate his NFL club to Baltimore. Support for the Stallions dried up almost overnight. With no reasonable prospect of successfully competing with an NFL team, and unwilling to have his club effectively reduced to "minor-league" status in Baltimore, Speros decided to move the Stallions elsewhere.

At one point, Speros was very close to moving the team to Houston, Texas. Although Houston at the time was still home to the NFL's Oilers, fan support for that team had collapsed due their pending relocation to Nashville (to later become the Titans). Speros had reason to believe a CFL team there could repeat the success that had been enjoyed in Baltimore. In addition, a team in Houston would have been natural rivals for the San Antonio Texans, who were still planning to play the 1996 season had at least one other U.S. team survived. On the other hand, the proposed move to Houston was considered in some circles to be little more than a ploy to win concessions from the NFL, which presumably would not have wanted to risk the embarrassment of having one of its teams outdrawn by a team from another league in the same city. The NFL would return to Houston in 2002 in the form of the Texans.

In the end, under prodding from league commissioner and former Alouettes running back Larry Smith, Speros began talks with Montreal. Smith had been looking for a way to return the CFL to Canada's second-largest market and, at the same time, find a way out of the failing American expansion (which Smith had also presided over). He believed that the defending Grey Cup champions would be a better vehicle for reviving football in Montreal than what would have effectively been an expansion team.

At a league meeting on February 2, 1996; Speros formally requested permission to move the Stallions to Montreal. The request was granted, officially ending the CFL's American experiment. However, talks had been so far advanced that at least one Baltimore outlet reported that the Stallions were moving to Montreal in January. According to at least one Canadian outlet, at the same time Speros had already begun deciding whether to retain the Stallions moniker or "revive" the Alouettes. He ultimately chose the latter course, reconstituting his organisation as the third incarnation of the Alouettes. While Speros was able to reclaim the history of the 1946–86 Alouettes/Concordes franchise, he was not allowed to retain the history of the Stallions. As a result, according to official CFL records, Speros is now reckoned as having surrendered the Stallions franchise before "reactivating" the Alouettes franchise. The Alouettes are now retconned as having suspended operations from 1987 to 1995, while the Stallions are officially one of only three modern-era Grey Cup champions to fold (after the Rough Riders and the original Alouettes). The Alouettes, however, do briefly mention the Stallions on their history page.

While all of the Stallions players were released from their contracts, general manager Jim Popp, who followed the team from Baltimore, was able to re-sign many of them. However, as with all the other U.S.-based CFL teams, the Stallions had been exempt from CFL rules that mandated a certain quota of Canadian "non-import" players on team rosters. For this reason, an expansion draft was held to help stock the Alouettes with the required number of Canadian players. Popp hired former Stallions assistant coach Bob Price to be the new head coach of the revived Alouettes. With the help of much of the core of the Stallions, the Alouettes were able to overcome a slow start to finish with their first winning record since 1979. They defeated the Hamilton Tiger-Cats in the East semifinal before being defeated by the Argos 43–7 in the East Final.

In 1997, Speros sold the team to developer and investor Robert Wetenhall, who owned the team until he officially transferred ownership to the league on May 31, 2019. Smith stepped down as league commissioner and became president of the Alouettes. Bob Price left the Alouettes to head south and coach in the NCAA. Popp hired former B.C. Lions head coach and Concordes defensive line coach Dave Ritchie as his successor.

=== Rebirth of the Montreal Alouettes (1996–1997) ===
The revived Alouettes franchise played their first two seasons at Olympic Stadium, but attendance in the cavernous domed stadium was very poor at first. The future of the franchise was very much in doubt until a twist of fate revitalized the floundering club. When a scheduled November 1997 U2 concert at Olympic Stadium conflicted with an unexpected home playoff game against the Lions (due to the CFL's recently re-established 'cross-over' playoff rule), the team decided to move the game to Molson Stadium, where they had played from 1954 to 1967. Interest in the team soared and the game was sold out, prompting the team to relocate permanently to the smaller venue beginning with the 1998 season. At the time of the Alouettes' return to Molson, the stadium's capacity was 20,202. Prior to every Sunday home game, the club plays "Sunday Bloody Sunday" over the PA system in tribute to the unintended role U2 played in saving the franchise. The team did not completely abandon the Olympic Stadium, and used it for one home game per year, from 2001 to 2009, and playoff games from 2001–2012. The Montreal Alouettes got off to a good start, winning 25 games and losing 11 in their first two seasons, and reaching the East Division Finals both times.

=== Anthony Calvillo era (1998–2013) ===
The fortunes for the Alouettes improved during the 1998 season, when they acquired a young free agent quarterback from the Hamilton Tiger-Cats, Anthony Calvillo, and they drafted slotback Ben Cahoon. Veterans Tracy Ham and Mike Pringle led the team to a second-place finish in the East Division, but they suffered a last-second loss to the Hamilton Tiger-Cats in the East Final. The Alouettes finally broke through in 1999, under new head coach Charlie Taaffe, winning their first division title since 1979. However, for the fourth consecutive season they lost the East Final match in a close game against the Tiger-Cats, 27–26.

Tracy Ham retired after the 1999 season, then Anthony Calvillo took over in the 2000 season as the full-time starting quarterback, and led the team to their first Grey Cup final since 1979, losing to BC in a close game, as they came within a missed two point convert of sending the game into overtime. After the season Charlie Taaffe resigned to become the head coach of the Maryland Terrapins. The 2001 season started under new coach Rod Rust at 9–2, but after Calvillo separated his shoulder, the team started struggling and after losing all their remaining games, GM Jim Popp fired Rust, led them into the playoffs, where they lost 24–12 to the Hamilton Tiger-Cats in the East Semi-Final.

During the off-season, the Alouettes signed Don Matthews to lead the team in the future. The 2002 Alouettes finished with the best record (13–5) in the CFL and won their first Grey Cup since 1977 by defeating one of their oldest rivals, and Matthews' former team, the Edmonton Eskimos, 25–16. The Alouettes had the best record in the CFL during the 2004 season at 14–4 and seemed likely to represent the East Division in the Grey Cup, but in the East Final, Anthony Calvillo got hurt, and was replaced by backup Ted White, and the Toronto Argonauts rallied to defeat the Alouettes, 26–18. During the 2004–2005 off-season, all time CFL career rushing yards leader Mike Pringle signed a one-day contract, so he could retire as a member of the Montreal Alouettes. The 2005 team participated in the first Grey Cup overtime game in almost 50 years. The Edmonton Eskimos defeated the Alouettes, 38–35.

During the 2006 season Matthews left his position as head coach near the end of the season due to health reasons, and Jim Popp took over for the rest of the season, leading the team to the Grey Cup, where they lost 25–14 to the B.C Lions.

Popp stayed on to coach the team during the 2007 season, and the team suffered its first losing season since coming back to Montreal in 1996, with an 8–10 record, hindered by the loss of starting quarterback Anthony Calvillo, who left the team near the end of the season to be with his wife who was sick. The team lost the East Semi-Final, 24–22, to the Winnipeg Blue Bombers with backup quarterback Marcus Brady behind center. With Montreal hosting the 2008 Grey Cup, the Alouettes wanted to be there, so they hired an experienced NFL assistant coach in Marc Trestman, and head coach Trestman helped lead them to an 11–7 record and a berth in the Grey Cup against the visiting Calgary Stampeders led by Henry Burris. The Stampeders defeated the hometown Montreal Alouettes, 22–14, in front of over 66,000 fans.

The 2009 season was a record breaking season for the Montreal Alouettes, as they set a team record for wins in a regular season, were a CFL-best 15–3, and their defence allowed only 324 points, the CFL second-fewest for an 18-game season. Marc Trestman won the coach of the year. The Alouettes earned a 28–27 comeback victory in the 2009 Grey Cup, thanks to the great play of Anthony Calvillo, Ben Cahoon, and Jamel Richardson. The Alouettes trailed the Saskatchewan Roughriders, 27–11, with 8 minutes to play in the game, when they started their comeback. It all came down to the foot of field goal kicker Damon Duval, who after missing a 43-yard field on the last play, got a second chance, when the Roughriders were called for having too many players on the field (The 13th Man), which was a ten-yard penalty, so kicking from the 33 yard line, Duval nailed it through the uprights, giving Montreal an improbable Grey Cup victory, after trailing the entire game. The game turned into a Grey Cup classic, thanks to the great play of the Alouettes veterans, and broke a streak of 4 straight losses in Grey Cups. The 2010 season was another good season for Montreal, as they went 12–6 and became the first team since the 1997 Toronto Argonauts to repeat as Grey Cup Champions. They played against the Saskatchewan Roughriders for the second straight year, and after trailing at halftime 8–11, the Alouettes outscored the Roughriders 13–0 until 3:30 left to play in the fourth quarter and held on to win the Championship by a score of 21–18.

The 2011 season was another record breaking year for Anthony Calvillo, as he broke numerous records, all against the Argonauts. During their first meeting Calvillo broke the CFL all time touchdown passes record of 394 TD passes on a pass to Eric Deslauriers, Damon Allen was at the game at Molson Stadium and personally congratulated him on breaking his record. He tied Allen's record in Regina the week before with the only touchdown pass ever caught by Tim Maypray. During the teams' second meeting, he broke the completions record with a completion to Brandon London. In the teams' third meeting, Anthony Calvillo became pro football's all-time career passing yards leader, on a Jamel Richardson touchdown pass to end the third quarter. The play was stopped as his family joined him along with Mark Cohon for a special on field presentation and video tribute. NFL greats Warren Moon and Dan Marino, ESPN's Chris Berman, and Damon Allen each sent video messages congratulating Calvillo on becoming the all-time career passing yards leader. Calvillo was presented with a special plaque, with the number 72382, the new pro football all-time yardage mark. Hampered by injuries to the entire secondary, the 2011 Alouettes lost in the East Semi-Final at Olympic Stadium by a score of 52–44 to the Hamilton Tiger-Cats.

The 2012 season was another good year for the Alouettes; however, after an 11–7 season, they lost the East Division Final to the Toronto Argonauts after Brian Bratton dropped a game-tying touchdown pass from Calvillo with a minute left in the game, giving Toronto a 27–20 win.

Before the 2013 season, coach Marc Trestman left the Alouettes for the NFL, becoming the head coach of the Chicago Bears. Dan Hawkins, who had no pro experience, was hired as head coach. After starting the season with a 2–3 record, Jim Popp fired Hawkins, and coached the team for the rest of the year. Calvillo suffered a season-ending concussion in Saskatchewan on a hit by Ricky Foley. Heisman Trophy winner Troy Smith, Tanner Marsh and Josh Neiswander played at quarterback for the Alouettes for the remainder of the season. The team had an 8–10 record, and made the playoffs for an 18th straight year. They lost the East Semi-Final 19–16 against the Tiger-Cats.

Anthony Calvillo announced his retirement on January 21, 2014, after a 20-year career, including the last 16 with the Alouettes.

=== Post-Anthony Calvillo era (2014–2018) ===
On February 24, 2014, the Alouettes named former Edmonton Eskimos and Calgary Stampeders coach Tom Higgins as the 21st head coach in franchise history. Higgins coached the Eskimos against the Alouettes in both the 90th and 91st Grey Cup games. The Alouettes finished with a .500 record, qualifying for the playoffs. After dismantling the BC Lions 50–17 in an East Semi-final crossover match, the Alouettes were beaten by the Tiger-Cats 40–24.

On May 22, 2015, Michael Sam signed a two-year contract with the Alouettes. The signing made him the first openly gay player in the CFL's history. However, Michael Sam left after one game. On August 21, 2015, owner Robert Wettenhall announced he had relieved Tom Higgins of his head coaching responsibilities and that general manager Jim Popp would take over the duties of head coach. The 2015 season was a difficult one for the Alouettes, due to injuries to starting QB Jonathan Crompton, the Alouettes went through five different quarterbacks including two rookies Rakeem Cato, and Brandon Bridge, before trading for veteran Kevin Glenn. By that time the quarterback shuffle had taken its toll on the team and they finished the year with a 6–12 record and missed the playoffs for the first time since 1986, their last year before folding on the eve of the 1987 season and the first time since their 1996 re-activation.

The following season on September 19, 2016, Popp was relieved of his coaching duties, while remaining as the team's general manager. Jacques Chapdelaine was named interim head coach, becoming the first Quebec-born head coach in Alouettes' history. He was named the permanent coach on December 13, 2016. Kavis Reed took over duties as the team's new general manager. 2016 was a dismal year for the team, finishing with another losing record of 7–11. After a 3–8 start to the 2017 season, Chapdelaine was fired on September 13, 2017. The Alouettes ended the season with their worst record since reactivation, 3–15.

On December 20, 2017, former Green Bay Packers head coach Mike Sherman was named the team's new head coach. Under Sherman the team suffered its fourth consecutive losing season, finishing the year with 5 wins and 13 losses. In the five seasons following Anthony Calvillo's retirement, the team won 30 games and lost 60.

=== Spiegel and Stern ownership, rebranding (2019–2022) ===
On February 1, 2019, the team unveiled a new logo and updated uniforms, designed by GRDN Studio, replacing the previous "angry bird" logo used since the team's reestablishment in 1996 with a stylized "M", designed to resemble a bird and plane, and introducing a new "MontreALS" tagline, playing upon the team's nickname. The team also partnered with Vice Media on aspects of accompanying marketing and content.

On May 31, 2019, Wetenhall surrendered his ownership of the Alouettes to the league, after having attempted to pursue a sale. The CFL would operate the team on its behalf while it searched for a new owner. Several prospective suitors for the team included Clifford Starke, a 35-year-old entrepreneur in medical cannabis who is friends with former Alouette player and CFL commissioner Larry Smith, who had been negotiating for a majority stake. Also interested was former Alouettes running back Eric Lapointe, whose 2017 bid had been rejected but had maintained interest in buying the team (though he withdrew in April 2019), and Vincenzo Guzzo, CEO of Quebec's Cinémas Guzzo cinema chain. As of early June of that year, CFL sources indicated it would not accept Starke's bid, while Guzzo's was said to be on hold. Guzzo later stated that he was displeased with the state of the Alouettes organization as a business and that, had he not been a Montreal resident, he would have never considered buying the team.

On June 8, two days after their last pre-season game, and just six days before their 2019 season opener, Khari Jones took over from Mike Sherman as interim head coach. Jones guided the Alouettes to a 10–8 record, good for a second-place finish in the East Division, and the team's first playoff berth since 2014. The Alouettes improved play during that season was also attributable to the performance of their quarterback Vernon Adams who passed for almost 4,000 yards. Although the team lost in the East Semi-Final to the crossover Edmonton Eskimos 37–29, the Alouettes removed the interim tag from Khari Jones' head coach title, and signed Jones to a three-year extension on November 26, 2019.

On January 6, 2020, after almost a year of being owned by the league, the Alouettes found new ownership in Crawford Steel's Sid Spiegel and his son-in-law Gary Stern, whose holding company S and S Sportsco would oversee the team. Spiegel died on July 28, 2021, before being able to see the team he bought play a game (the 2020 season was cancelled due to the COVID-19 pandemic); in effect, the team was controlled by his estate. On August 29, 2022 Gary Stern announced that he was stepping away from day-to-day operations with the club and resigning from his role with the Canadian Football League's board of governors, effective immediately.

=== Pierre Karl Péladeau ownership era (2023–present) ===
On February 14, 2023, the ownership of the Alouettes was transferred back to the CFL. Mario Cecchini was appointed as the interim President while the league sought to finalize a sale to new ownership. On March 10, 2023, the CFL announced that Pierre Karl Péladeau had purchased the team. On March 28, 2023, Pierre Karl Péladeau announced the hiring of Mark Weightman as president and CEO of the team. The 2023 season saw the Alouettes go 11–7, finishing second in the East Division, but then upsetting the heavily favoured Toronto Argonauts 38–17 to win the East Division Final, and then win the Grey Cup in a 28–24 upset against the heavily favoured Winnipeg Blue Bombers. The team returned to the Grey Cup in 2025, losing to the Saskatchewan Roughriders 25–17.

== Current roster ==
Montreal Alouettes roster
**Quarterbacks**: 10 Davis Alexander; 16 Dustin Crum; 18 Caleb Evans; **Receivers**: 82 Kaseem Ferdinand; 11 Rohan Jones; 83 Mekhi Mews WR/KR; 6 Tyson Philpot; 4 Charleston Rambo; 85 Tyler Snead; 17 Cole Spieker; 89 Jerreth Sterns; **Running backs**: 8 Stevie Scott III; **Fullbacks**: 39 David Dallaire; 38 Jacob Mason	**Offensive linemen**: 62 Nick Callender; 65 Sage Doxtater; 59 Cyrille Hogan-Saindon; 54 Justin Lawrence; 66 Pier-Olivier Lestage; 52 Tiger Shanks; 68 Donny Ventrelli; **Defensive linemen**: 91 Isaac Adeyemi-Berglund; 97 Joshua Archibald; 25 Julian Howsare; 94 Mustafa Johnson; 96 Lwal Uguak; 95 Daniel Wise; 98 Dylan Wynn	**Linebackers**: 2 Micah Awe; 26 Tyrice Beverette; 9 Geoffrey Cantin-Arku; 34 Alexandre Gagné; 41 Riley MacLeod; **Defensive backs**: 23 Nate Beauchemin; 20 Lorenzo Burns; 21 Don Callis; 48 Kabion Ento; 1 Robert Kennedy; 22 Shakespeare Louis; 12 Najee Murray; 0 Jonathan Sutherland; 37 Wesley Sutton; **Special teams**: 50 Louis-Philippe Bourassa LS; 19 José Maltos Díaz K; 36 Joseph Zema P	**Reserve**: 93 Bryce Ganious DL; 60 Des Holmes OL; **1-game Injured**: 29 Neil Campbell DB; 3 Régis Cibasu WR; 7 Devonte Dedmon WR; 88 Marco Dubois WR; 64 Reuben Fatheree II OL; 31 Faion Hicks DB; 15 Alexander Hollins WR; 35 Shomari Lawrence RB; 49 Gabriel Lessard LB; 42 Tyrell Richards LB; 30 Liam Talbot RB; 5 Travis Theis RB; **6-game injured**: 55 Braydon Noll OL	**Practice roster**: 40 Ty Anderson DL; 81 Cortez Braham Jr. WR; 79 Jack Burgess P; 43 Gemon Green DB; 44 Kylan Guidry DL; 47 T. J. Guy DL; 90 Decarius Hawthorne DL; 46 Donovan Manuel LB; 99 David Perales DL; 45 Quinn Urwiler LB; 53 Anthony Vandal OL; 71 Lewis Ward K; 14 Terry Wilson QB; **Suspended**: 41 Cameron Brown; -- Jarrett Horst; 31 Keanu Yazbeck
Italics indicate American player • **Bold** indicates Global player • 45 Roster, 2 Reserve, 13 Injured, 13 Practice, 3 Suspended; Roster updated 2026-11-14 • Depth chart • Transactions • More CFL rosters

== Current coaching staff ==
Montreal Alouettes staff
Front office: Owner – Pierre Karl Péladeau; President & CEO – Mark Weightman; General manager – Danny Maciocia; Assistant General Manager – Pier-Yves Lavergne; Assistant to the General Manager and Player Personnel – Marcel Desjardins; Senior Personnel Executive – Jean-Marc Edmé; Director of Player Personnel – Byron Archambault; Director of Football Operations – Allyson Sobol; Scout – Rob McIntyre; Head Video Coordinator – Rico Morotti; Head coaches: Head coach – Jason Maas; Assistant Head Coach/Special Teams Coordinator – Byron Archambault; Offensive coaches: Offensive Coordinator & Quarterbacks – Anthony Calvillo; Offensive Line – David Brown; Receivers & Pass Game Coordinator – Michael Lionello; Running Backs & Tight Ends – Dave Jackson; Offensive Assistant – Domenico Manno	Defensive coaches: Defensive Coordinator & Defensive Backs – Noel Thorpe; Linebackers – A. J. Gass; Defensive Line – Corvey Irvin; Defensive Assistant – Bryan Wyllie; Staff: Equipment Manager – David Deschamps; Head Athletic Therapist – Tristan Castonguay; Assistant Athletic Therapist - Dillon Warren; → Coaching Staff → More CFL staffs

== Television and radio ==
The Alouettes' English radio network is fronted by Bell Media's CKGM, while Cogeco's CHMP-FM is the French-language flagship.

Games are also heard on SiriusXM Canada and their French service Influence Franco (XM 174) and Attitude Franco (Sirius 164).

The Alouettes' main television coverage is fronted by TSN and French sister network RDS.

== Players of note ==
=== Retired numbers ===
Montreal Alouettes retired numbers
No.	Player	Position	Tenure	Championships
13	Anthony Calvillo	QB	1998–2013	2002, 2009, 2010
27	Mike Pringle	RB	1996–2002	2002
28	George Dixon	RB	1959–1965	–
56	Herb Trawick	G/T/DL	1946–1957	1949
63	Pierre Desjardins	G/T	1966–1971	1970
74	Peter Dalla Riva	TE/SB	1968–1981	1970, 1974, 1977
75	Hal Patterson	WR/DB	1954–1960	–
77	Junior Ah You	DE	1972–1981	1974, 1977
78	Virgil Wagner	HB	1946–1954	1949
86	Ben Cahoon	SB	1998–2010	2002, 2009, 2010
92	Sam Etcheverry	QB	1952–1960	–

=== Canadian Football Hall of Fame ===
Montreal Alouettes Canadian Football Hall of Famers
No.	Name	Position	Tenure	Class	No.	Name	Position	Tenure	Class
92	Sam Etcheverry	QB	1952–1960	1969	8	Tracy Ham	QB	1996–1999	2010
75	Hal Patterson	WR/DB	1954–1960	1971	57	Elfrid Payton	DE	1996–1999	2010
28	George Dixon	RB	1959–1965	1974	–	Don Matthews	Head coach	2002–2006	2011
–	Lew Hayman	Head coach/General manager	1946–1954	1975	65	Miles Gorrell	OL	1982–1985	2011
56	Herb Trawick	G/T/DL	1946–1957	1975	39	Wally Buono	LB	1973–1982	2014
78	Virgil Wagner	HB	1946–1954	1980	86	Ben Cahoon	SB	1998–2010	2014
36	Red O'Quinn	End	1952–1959	1981	53	Uzooma Okeke	T	1997–2006	2014
50	Tony Pajaczkowski	G/DE	1966–1967	1988	–	Bob Wetenhall	Owner	1997–2018	2014
72	Marv Luster	DB/WR	1961–1964, 1973–1974	1990	13	Anthony Calvillo	QB	1998–2013	2017
77	Junior Ah You	DE	1972–1981	1993	48	Tom Hugo	C/LB	1953–1959	2018
–	Sam Berger	Owner	1969–1981	1993	31	Barron Miles	DB	1998–2004	2018
74	Peter Dalla Riva	TE/SB	1968–1981	1993	57	Scott Flory	OL	1999–2013	2018
22	Gene Gaines	DB	1961, 1970–1976	1994	–	Marv Levy	Head coach	1973–1977	2021
65	Bruce Coulter	QB/DB	1948–1957	1997	8	Nik Lewis	SB	2015–2017	2021
25	Terry Evanshen	WR	1965, 1970–1973	1997	11	Chip Cox	DB	2006–2018	2022
18	Dickie Harris	DB	1972–1980	1999	–	Dave Ritchie	Head coach	1997–1998	2022
–	Cal Murphy	Offensive coordinator	1977	2004	7	John Bowman	DE	2006–2020	2023
67	Dan Yochum	T	1972–1980	2004	59	Josh Bourke	OL	2007–2015	2023
65	Ed George	T	1970–1974	2005	66	Lloyd Fairbanks	OL	1983–1986	2023
59	Pierre Vercheval	G	1998–2001	2007	–	Jacques Dussault	Assistant coach	1982–1986, 1997–1999	2023
27	Mike Pringle	RB	1996–2002	2008	–	Larry Smith	President	1997–2001, 2004–2010	2023
64	Glen Weir	DT	1972–1984	2009	19	S. J. Green	SB	2007–2016	2024
					4	Chad Owens	SB/KR	2009	2024

== Head coaches ==
- Lew Hayman (1946–1951)
- Peahead Walker (1952–1959)
- Perry Moss (1960–1962)
- Jim Trimble (1963–1965)
- Darrell Mudra (1966)
- Kay Dalton (1967–1969)
- Sam Etcheverry (1970–1972)
- Marv Levy (1973–1977)
- Joe Scannella (1978–1981)
- Jim Eddy (1981)
- Joe Galat (1982–1985)
- Gary Durchik (1985–1986)
- Joe Faragalli (1987 – was named head coach but the Alouettes folded before their 1987 regular season started)
- Bob Price (1996)
- Dave Ritchie (1997–1998)
- Charlie Taaffe (1999–2000)
- Rod Rust (2001)
- Jim Popp (2001, 2006–2007, 2013, 2015–2016)
- Don Matthews (2002–2006)
- Marc Trestman (2008–2012)
- Dan Hawkins (2013)
- Tom Higgins (2014–2015)
- Jacques Chapdelaine (2016–2017)
- Kavis Reed (2017)
- Mike Sherman (2018)
- Khari Jones (2019–2022)
- Danny Maciocia (2022)
- Jason Maas (2023–present)

== General managers ==
- Lew Hayman (1946–1954)
- Vic Obeck (1955–1956)
- Gorman Kennedy (1957–1959)
- Perry Moss (1960–1962)
- Jim Trimble (1963–1964)
- Ted Workman (1965–1967)
- Tony Golab (1968–1969)
- Red O'Quinn (1970–1971)
- J. I. Albrecht (1972–1973)
- Bob Geary (1974–1981)
- Sam Etcheverry (1982–1983)
- Joe Galat (1983–1986)
- Norm Kimball (1986)
- Jim Popp (1996–2016)
- Kavis Reed (2016–2019)
- Danny Maciocia (2020–present)

== Mascots ==
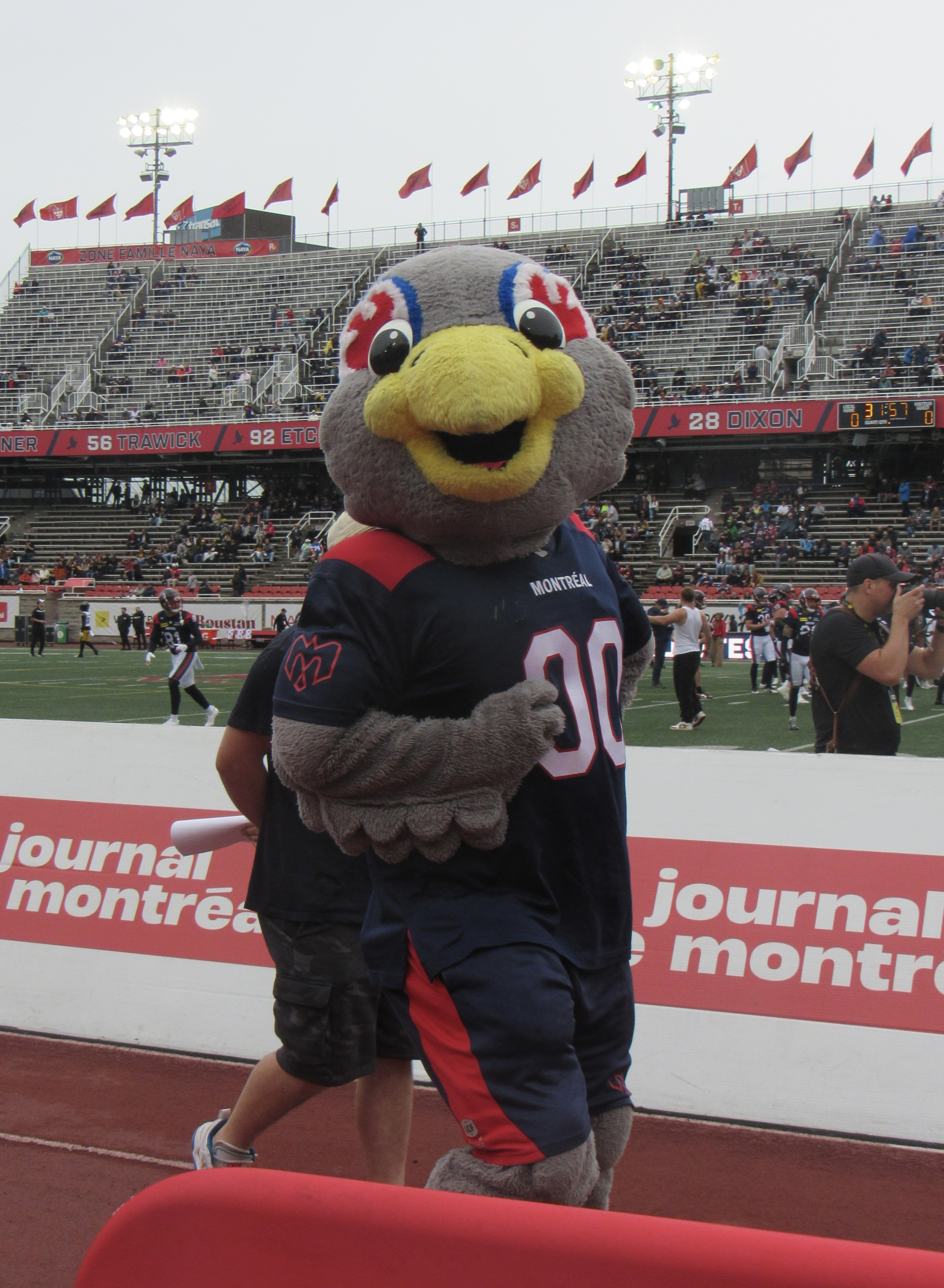
Touché, the Alouettes' mascot, in 2025

Touché is the mascot for the Montreal Alouettes. The team introduced a second mascot in 1999 named Blitz, but Blitz was discontinued at the start of the 2013 season.

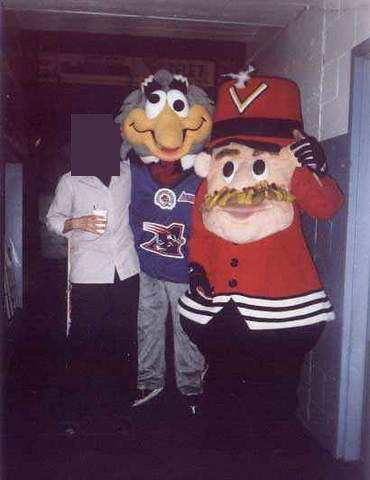
Blitz (centre), former mascot of the Alouettes, poses for a photo with former Drummondville Voltigeurs mascot Boum-Boum (right) and an unnamed man (left) at Centre Marcel Dionne in April 2002.

== See also ==
- Montreal Alouettes all time records and statistics
- Canadian Football Hall of Fame
- Montreal Machine
