= Des Holmes =

American football player (born 1999)

No. 60 – Montreal Alouettes
- Position: Offensive lineman
- Roster status: Practice roster
- CFL status: American

Personal information
- Born: July 28, 1999 (age 27); Norristown, Pennsylvania, U.S.
- Listed height: 6 ft 5 in (1.96 m)
- Listed weight: 307 lb (139 kg)

Career information
- High school: Cardinal O'Hara (Springfield, Pennsylvania)
- College: Penn State (2017–2021); Arizona State (2022)
- NFL draft: 2023: undrafted

Career history
- Ottawa Redblacks (2024)*; Montreal Alouettes (2025–present)
- * Offseason or practice squad member only
- Stats at CFL.ca

Gillis Desmond Holmes (born July 28, 1999) is an American professional football offensive lineman for the Montreal Alouettes of the Canadian Football League (CFL). He played college football at Penn State and Arizona State.

== Early life ==
Gillis Desmond Holmes was born on July 28, 1999, in Norristown, Pennsylvania. He played his freshman year of high school football as a varsity starter on the defensive line at Norristown Area High School. He played his final three years at Cardinal O'Hara High School in Springfield Township, Delaware County, Pennsylvania. He was converted to offensive tackle before his junior season. He earned first-team All-State and Class 4A Lineman of the Year honors his senior year in 2016. In the class of 2017, Holmes was rated a three-star prospect by all four of the major recruiting services (247Sports.com, ESPN.com, Rivals.com, and Scout.com). He also played basketball in high school. Penn State was one of sixteen schools to offer him a scholarship.

== College career ==
Holmes played college football for the Penn State Nittany Lions of Pennsylvania State University. He was redshirted in 2017. He appeared in five games as a redshirt freshman in 2018. Holmes played in all 13 games in 2019. Due to injuries, he only played in four games during the COVID-19 shortened 2020 season. He appeared in 11 games in 2021. Every game of his Penn State career was in a reserve role. Holmes majored in journalism at Penn State.

In 2022, Holmes transferred to play for the Arizona State Sun Devils of Arizona State University as a graduate transfer. He played in ten games, all starts, during the 2022 season while also missing some time due to injury.

== Professional career ==
Pre-draft measurables
Height	Weight	Arm length	Hand span	Wingspan	Bench press
6 ft 4 7/8 in (1.95 m)	307 lb (139 kg)	32 3/8 in (0.82 m)	9 1/2 in (0.24 m)	6 ft 6 in (1.98 m)	23 reps
All values from Pro Day

Holmes went undrafted in the 2023 NFL draft. On June 16, 2023, he was selected by the Seattle Sea Dragons in the 2023 XFL rookie draft. However, he did not sign with them.

Holmes signed with the Ottawa Redblacks of the Canadian Football League (CFL) on January 23, 2024. He was released on May 15, 2024.

Holmes signed a two-year contract with the CFL's Montreal Alouettes on February 20, 2025. He was moved to the practice roster on June 1, and promoted to the active roster on June 12. He then started four games for the Alouettes before being moved back to the practice roster on July 15, 2025.

== Personal life ==
Holmes' father, Lee Holmes, played college basketball at Shippensburg University.
