= Decarius Hawthorne =

American gridiron football player (born 2002)

No. 90 – Montreal Alouettes
- Position: Defensive lineman
- Roster status: Active
- CFL status: American

Personal information
- Born: January 2, 2002 (age 24); Birmingham, Alabama, U.S.
- Listed height: 6 ft 2 in (1.88 m)
- Listed weight: 289 lb (131 kg)

Career information
- High school: Center Point (Birmingham)
- College: Florida Atlantic (2020–2023); South Florida (2024)
- NFL draft: 2025: undrafted

Career history
- Los Angeles Rams (2025)*; Montreal Alouettes (2025–present)
- * Offseason or practice squad member only

Awards and highlights
- Second-team All-AAC (2024)
- Stats at CFL.ca

Decarius Hawthorne (born January 2, 2002) is an American professional football defensive lineman for the Montreal Alouettes of the Canadian Football League (CFL). He played college football for the Florida Atlantic Owls and South Florida Bulls.

== Early life ==
Hawthorne was born on January 2, 2002, in Birmingham, Alabama. He attended Center Point High School in Birmingham. As a junior, he had 56 tackles, including 20 for loss, four sacks four forced fumbles, one fumble recovery and two blocked punts.

== College career ==
Hawthorne played college football for the Florida Atlantic Owls from 2020 to 2023 and South Florida Bulls in 2024. In 34 games for Florida Atlantic, he had 46 tackles, including 13.5 for loss and five sacks. On April 26, 2024, Hawthorne entered the transfer portal.

On May 4, 2024, Hawthorne committed to University of South Florida. He played in 13 games, recording 40 tackles, including 10.5 for loss, two pass deflections and one forced fumble and fumble recovery. Hawthorne earned second-team All-AAC honors for the Bulls in 2024.

== Professional career ==
=== Los Angeles Rams ===
After not being selected in the 2025 NFL draft, Hawthorne signed with the Los Angeles Rams of the National Football League (NFL) as an undrafted free agent.

=== Montreal Alouettes ===
On October 29, 2025, the Montreal Alouettes of the Canadian Football League (CFL) signed Hawthorne to the practice roster. On November 27, he signed a contract extension with the team through the 2027 season. Hawthorne played in the first two games of the 2026 season, recording three tackles. On June 17, 2026, he was moved to the practice roster. On August 7, Hawthorne was elevated to the active roster and dressed against the Edmonton Elks, before he reverted to the practice roster on August 17. On September 1, he was again promoted to the active roster.
