= Donny Ventrelli =

American gridiron football player (born 2000)

- Ventrelli with the Montreal Alouettes in 2026

No. 68 – Montreal Alouettes
- Position: Offensive lineman
- Roster status: Active
- CFL status: American

Personal information
- Born: May 25, 2000 (age 26)
- Listed height: 6 ft 4 in (1.93 m)
- Listed weight: 298 lb (135 kg)

Career information
- High school: Como Park (Saint Paul, Minnesota)
- College: North Dakota
- NFL draft: 2024: undrafted

Career history
- Montreal Alouettes (2024–present)

Awards and highlights
- 2× Second-team All-MVFC (2022–2023)
- Stats at CFL.ca

Donald Ventrelli (born May 25, 2000) is an American professional football offensive lineman for the Montreal Alouettes of the Canadian Football League (CFL). He played college football at North Dakota.

== Early life ==
Donald Ventrelli was born on May 25, 2000. He attended Como Park Senior High School in Saint Paul, Minnesota.

== College career ==
Ventrelli played college football for the North Dakota Fighting Hawks of the University of North Dakota. He was redshirted in 2018. He played in ten games, starting eight, as a redshirt freshman in 2019. Ventrelli started all seven games at right tackle during the Fighting Hawks' COVID-19 shortened 2020 season. He started all 11 games in 2021, with the first three games coming at left guard and the final eight at right tackle. He started all 12 games at left tackle during the 2022 season, and was also a team captain. Ventrelli was named the Missouri Valley Football Conference (MVFC) Offensive Lineman of the Week for November 7 after a 42–7 win over Indiana State. He earned second-team All-MVFC honors for his performance during the 2022 season. He started all 12 games at left guard as a sixth-year senior in 2023. He was a team captain and second-team All-MVFC for the second straight year. Ventrelli majored in kinesiology at North Dakota.

== Professional career ==
Pre-draft measurables
Height	Weight	Arm length	Hand span	Wingspan	40-yard dash	10-yard split	20-yard split	20-yard shuttle	Three-cone drill	Vertical jump	Broad jump	Bench press
6 ft 3 3/4 in (1.92 m)	295 lb (134 kg)	32 1/2 in (0.83 m)	9 7/8 in (0.25 m)	6 ft 5 1/4 in (1.96 m)	5.06 s	1.79 s	2.90 s	4.60 s	7.43 s	28.0 in (0.71 m)	9 ft 1 in (2.77 m)	21 reps
All values from Pro Day

After going undrafted in the 2024 NFL draft, Ventrelli attended rookie minicamp on a tryout basis with the Chicago Bears. He then signed with the Montreal Alouettes of the Canadian Football League on May 20, 2024. He was moved to the practice roster on June 2, promoted to the active roster on August 20, moved back to the practice roster on September 4, promoted to the active roster again on October 26, and moved back to the practice roster for the third time on November 7. He was placed on the one-game injured list on November 9, 2024. Ventrelli dressed in two games overall, starting one, during the 2024 season.

During training camp in 2025, Ventrelli was named the team's starting right guard for the 2025 season.
