= Gemon Green =

American football player (born 1999)

Montreal Alouettes
- Position: Cornerback
- Roster status: Practice roster
- CFL status: American

Personal information
- Born: October 20, 1999 (age 27); DeSoto, Texas, U.S.
- Listed height: 6 ft 2 in (1.88 m)
- Listed weight: 190 lb (86 kg)

Career information
- High school: DeSoto
- College: Michigan (2018–2022)
- NFL draft: 2023: undrafted

Career history
- New York Giants (2023)*; Green Bay Packers (2024)*; Michigan Panthers (2025)*; Montreal Alouettes (2026–present)
- * Offseason or practice squad member only
- Stats at CFL.ca

Gemon Green (born October 20, 1999) is an American professional football cornerback for the Montreal Alouettes of the Canadian Football League (CFL). He played college football for the University of Michigan. He began his professional football career in the National Football League (NFL) for the New York Giants as an undrafted free agent in 2023.

== Early life ==
Green was born on October 20, 1999, in DeSoto, Texas as one of two sons to Valecia and George Green. His twin brother named German would go on to play college football with the University of Michigan Wolverines.

Green played high school football as a cornerback for the DeSoto Eagles, earning first-team all-district selection honors as a junior in 2016. He graduated in 2017. Rated a three-star recruit, he received five offers before committing to the University of Michigan.

== College career ==
Green joined the field the following year after redshirting the 2018 season. While at Michigan, Green played cornerback and defensive back with the Wolverines. In 2022, during Green's graduate season, it was reported on October 31, after the Michigan vs. Michigan State game, Green was assaulted in the stadium tunnel by Michigan State Spartans players. Green along with teammate Ja’Den McBurrows were injured. Having already removed his helmet on his way to the locker room, Green was assaulted with a hand to his face followed by a strike with a helmet from MSU player Khary Crump. The assault resulted in Green sustaining a cut near the side of his right eye and a concussion. Green started 24 games while at Michigan, making 10 of 13 appearances during the 2022 season. He played 42 games and totalled 71 tackles, including 49 solo and 22 assisted. He also made 11 pass breakups and one interception. While at Michigan, Green majored in general studies. Green declared for the 2023 NFL draft.

== Professional career ==
Pre-draft measurables
| Height | Weight | Arm length | Hand span | Wingspan | 40-yard dash | 10-yard split | 20-yard split | 20-yard shuttle | Three-cone drill | Vertical jump | Broad jump | Bench press |
|---|---|---|---|---|---|---|---|---|---|---|---|---|
| 6 ft 1 in (1.85 m) | 183 lb (83 kg) | 31 in (0.79 m) | 9 3/8 in (0.24 m) | 6 ft 3 1/4 in (1.91 m) | 4.53 s | 1.50 s | 2.59 s | 4.51 s | 7.13 s | 37.5 in (0.95 m) | 10 ft 6 in (3.20 m) | 12 reps |
All values from Pro Day

=== New York Giants ===
Green signed with the Giants as an undrafted free agent in April 2023. He was assigned to the practice squad before he was released in August 2023.

=== Green Bay Packers ===
On April 10, 2024, Green signed with the Green Bay Packers after being cleared post-shoulder surgery.

=== Michigan Panthers ===
On September 10, 2024, Green signed with the Michigan Panthers of the United Football League. He was released on March 20, 2025.

=== Montreal Alouettes ===
On March 3, 2026, Green signed with the Montreal Alouettes of the Canadian Football League.

== Personal life ==
Green has a twin brother named German who joined him in attending the University of Michigan to play college football. Their father George owns a trucking company in Texas. Green and his brother are described by their father as "daddy boys."
