= Cameron Brown (cornerback) =

American football player (born 2000)

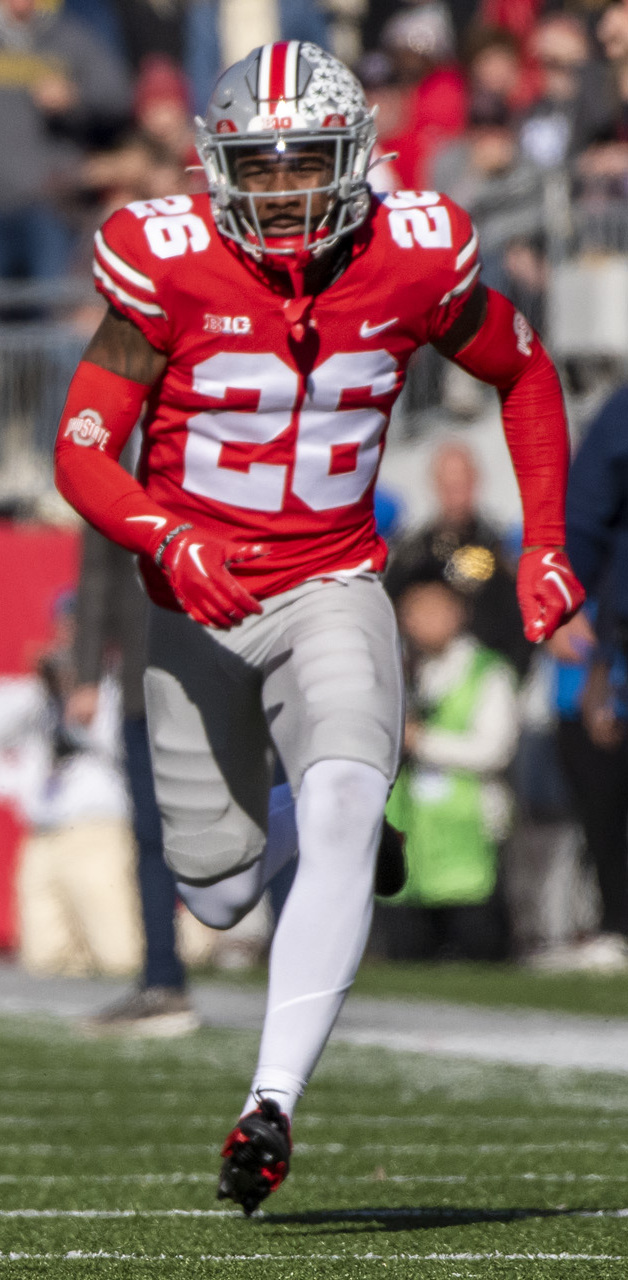
- Brown with Ohio State in 2022

Montreal Alouettes
- Position: Cornerback

Personal information
- Born: April 6, 2000 (age 26); St. Louis, Missouri, U.S.
- Listed height: 6 ft 0 in (1.83 m)
- Listed weight: 199 lb (90 kg)

Career information
- High school: Christian Brothers College (Town and Country, Missouri)
- College: Ohio State (2018–2022)
- NFL draft: 2023: undrafted

Career history
- Los Angeles Chargers (2023)*; Arlington Renegades (2024); Montreal Alouettes (2025–present)
- * Offseason or practice squad member only
- Stats at Pro Football Reference

Cameron Brown (born April 6, 2000) is an American professional football cornerback for the Montreal Alouettes of the Canadian Football League (CFL). He played college football at Ohio State.

== Early life ==
Brown grew up in Saint Louis, Missouri, and attended Christian Brothers College. He was a four-star recruit in football and committed to play at Nebraska, but flipped his commitment to Ohio State.

== College career ==
In his collegiate career, Brown totaled 55 tackles, 2.5 being for a loss, an interception, and 12 pass deflections. His best year occurred during the 2021 season where he posted 25 tackles, his one career interception, and seven pass deflections. His performance led to him being named an honorable mention all-Big Ten selection by both the coaches and the media.

== Professional career ==
Pre-draft measurables
Height	Weight	Arm length	Hand span	Wingspan	40-yard dash	10-yard split	20-yard split	20-yard shuttle	Three-cone drill	Vertical jump	Broad jump	Bench press
6 ft 0 in (1.83 m)	199 lb (90 kg)	31 in (0.79 m)	9 in (0.23 m)	6 ft 3 7/8 in (1.93 m)	4.57 s	1.63 s	2.63 s	4.59 s	7.12 s	35.5 in (0.90 m)	9 ft 7 in (2.92 m)	10 reps
All values from NFL Combine/Pro Day

After not being selected in the 2023 NFL draft was picked up by the Chargers as an undrafted free agent. He was waived on August 29, 2023.

On December 18, 2023, Brown was signed by the Arlington Renegades of the XFL. He was placed on injured reserve on March 7, 2024. He was waived on August 26, 2024.

Brown signed with the Montreal Alouettes on December 2, 2024.
