= Braydon Noll =

Canadian gridiron football player (born 1997)

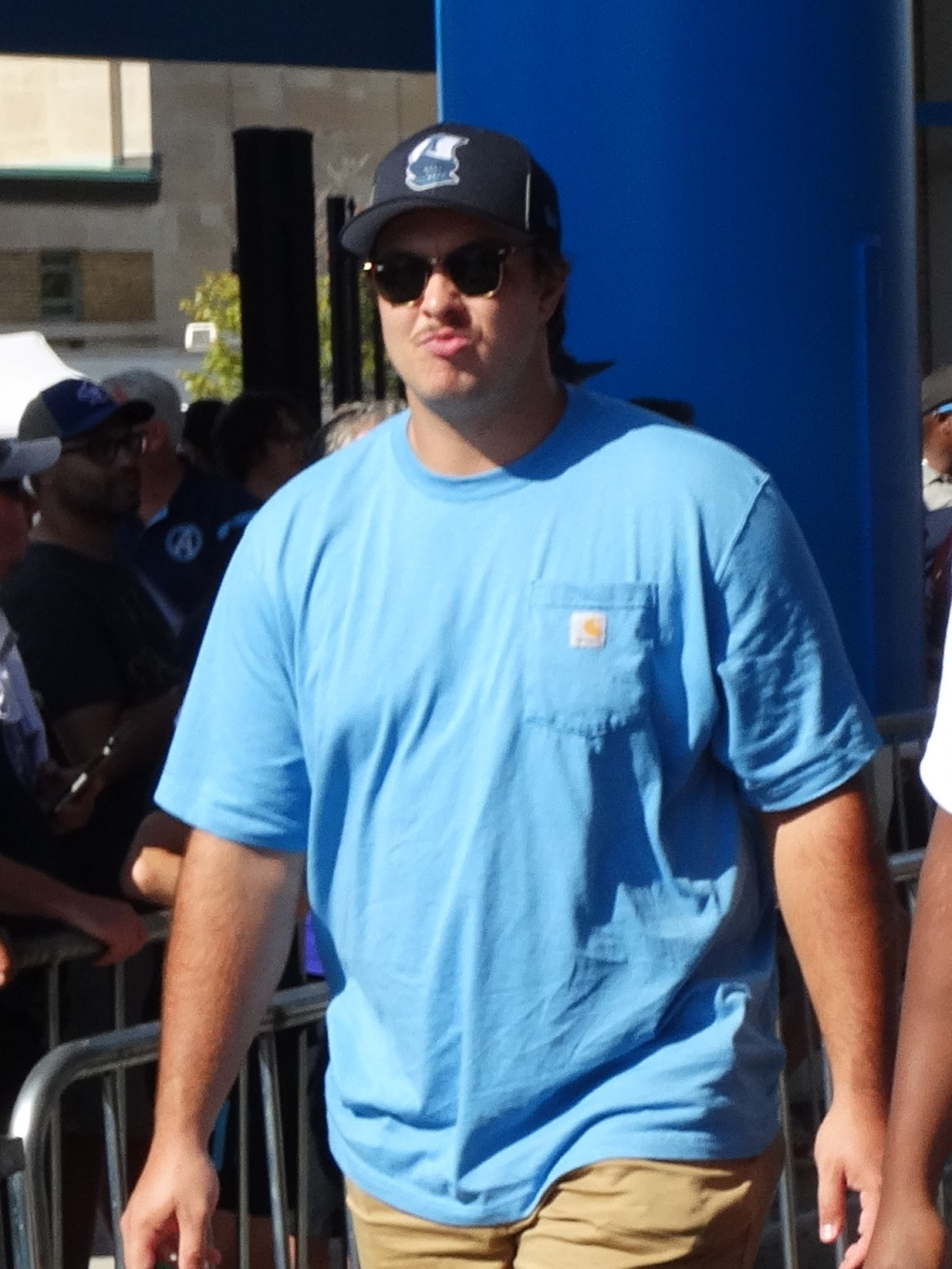
- Noll with the Toronto Argonauts in 2022

Montreal Alouettes
- Position: Offensive lineman
- Roster status: Active
- CFL status: National

Personal information
- Born: October 27, 1997 (age 29); Orangeville, Ontario, Canada
- Listed height: 6 ft 5 in (1.96 m)
- Listed weight: 314 lb (142 kg)

Career information
- High school: Trinity College School (Port Hope, Ontario)
- University: Wilfrid Laurier (2016–2021)
- CFL draft: 2022: 4th round, 35th overall pick

Career history
- Toronto Argonauts (2022–2024); Saskatchewan Roughriders (2024–2025); Montreal Alouettes (2026–present)

Awards and highlights
- 2× Grey Cup champion (2022, 2025)

Career CFL statistics as of 2026
- Games played: 30
- Stats at CFL.ca

Braydon Noll (born October 27, 1997) is a Canadian professional football offensive lineman for the Montreal Alouettes of the Canadian Football League (CFL). He played U Sports football for the Wilfrid Laurier Golden Hawks.

== University career ==
Noll played U Sports football for the Wilfrid Laurier Golden Hawks from 2016 to 2021. He played in 23 games in his career, originally at defensive line before switching to the offensive line his sophomore year.

== Professional career ==
Pre-draft measurables
Height	Weight	40-yard dash	20-yard shuttle	Three-cone drill	Vertical jump	Broad jump	Bench press
6 ft 4 3/8 in (1.94 m)	298 lb (135 kg)	5.35 s	4.96 s	8.00 s	28.0 in (0.71 m)	8 ft 4 5/8 in (2.56 m)	19 reps
All values from CFL Combine

=== Toronto Argonauts ===
Noll was selected in the 35th pick of the fourth round in the 2022 CFL draft by the Toronto Argonauts. He officially signed to the team on May 9, 2022. Noll played in one game and won his first Grey Cup championship as the Argonauts defeated the Winnipeg Blue Bombers 24–23 in the 109th Grey Cup.

He was released on May 15, 2023, before re-signing on June 2, to the practice roster. In 2023, Noll played in five games before being released by the Argonauts on June 1, 2024, as part of final roster cuts.

=== Saskatchewan Roughriders ===
On August 5, 2024, Noll signed with the Saskatchewan Roughriders. He dressed for four games and re-signed with the team on November 19, 2024.

Noll made the final roster and played in eleven games in 2025, including his first start at center against the Winnipeg Blue Bombers on October 17, 2025. He finished the year on the injured list including when the Roughriders won the 112th Grey Cup. He became a free agent upon the expiry of his contract on February 10, 2026.

=== Montreal Alouettes ===
On February 10, 2026, it was announced that Noll had signed with the Montreal Alouettes.
