= Bryce Ganious =

American gridiron football player (born 2003)

- Ganious with the Montreal Alouettes in 2026

No. 93 – Montreal Alouettes
- Position: Defensive lineman
- Roster status: Active
- CFL status: American

Personal information
- Born: August 25, 2003 (age 23)
- Listed height: 6 ft 1 in (1.85 m)
- Listed weight: 307 lb (139 kg)

Career information
- High school: Second Baptist (Houston, Texas)
- College: Villanova (2021–2022); Wake Forest (2023–2024)
- NFL draft: 2025: undrafted

Career history
- New England Patriots (2025)*; Montreal Alouettes (2026–present)
- * Offseason or practice squad member only
- Stats at CFL.ca

Bryce Ganious (born August 25, 2003) is an American professional football defensive lineman for the Montreal Alouettes of the Canadian Football League (CFL). He played college football for the Villanova Wildcats and Wake Forest Demon Deacons.

== Early life ==
Ganious was born on August 25, 2003. He attended Second Baptist School in Houston, Texas, where he earned four varsity letters in both football and track and field.

== College career ==
Ganious played college football for the Villanova Wildcats from 2021 to 2022 and Wake Forest Demon Deacons from 2023 to 2024. In 24 games at Villanova, he had 58 tackles, including ten for loss, four sacks, three forced fumbles and a fumble recovery. On December 6, 2022, Ganious entered the transfer portal. On January 6, 2023, he committed to Wake Forest University. Ganious appeared in 22 games, recording 54 tackles, with 7.5 for loss and four sacks.

== Professional career ==
Pre-draft measurables
Height	Weight	Arm length	Hand span	40-yard dash	10-yard split	20-yard split	20-yard shuttle	Three-cone drill	Vertical jump	Broad jump	Bench press
6 ft 0 3/8 in (1.84 m)	293 lb (133 kg)	32 1/4 in (0.82 m)	9 1/2 in (0.24 m)	5.06 s	1.66 s	2.81 s	4.55 s	7.55 s	29.5 in (0.75 m)	9 ft 0 in (2.74 m)	30 reps
All values from Pro day

=== New England Patriots ===
After going unselected in the 2025 NFL draft, Ganious signed with the New England Patriots of the National Football League (NFL) as an undrafted free agent. On August 11, he was released by the team.

=== Montreal Alouettes ===
On January 21, 2026, the Montreal Alouettes of the Canadian Football League (CFL) signed Ganious. On May 31, he was released. On September 27, Ganious was re-signed by the team to the practice roster. On October 16, he was elevated to the active roster and made his CFL debut the following day in a depth role against the Saskatchewan Roughriders.
