= Tyson Philpot =

Canadian gridiron football player (born 2000)

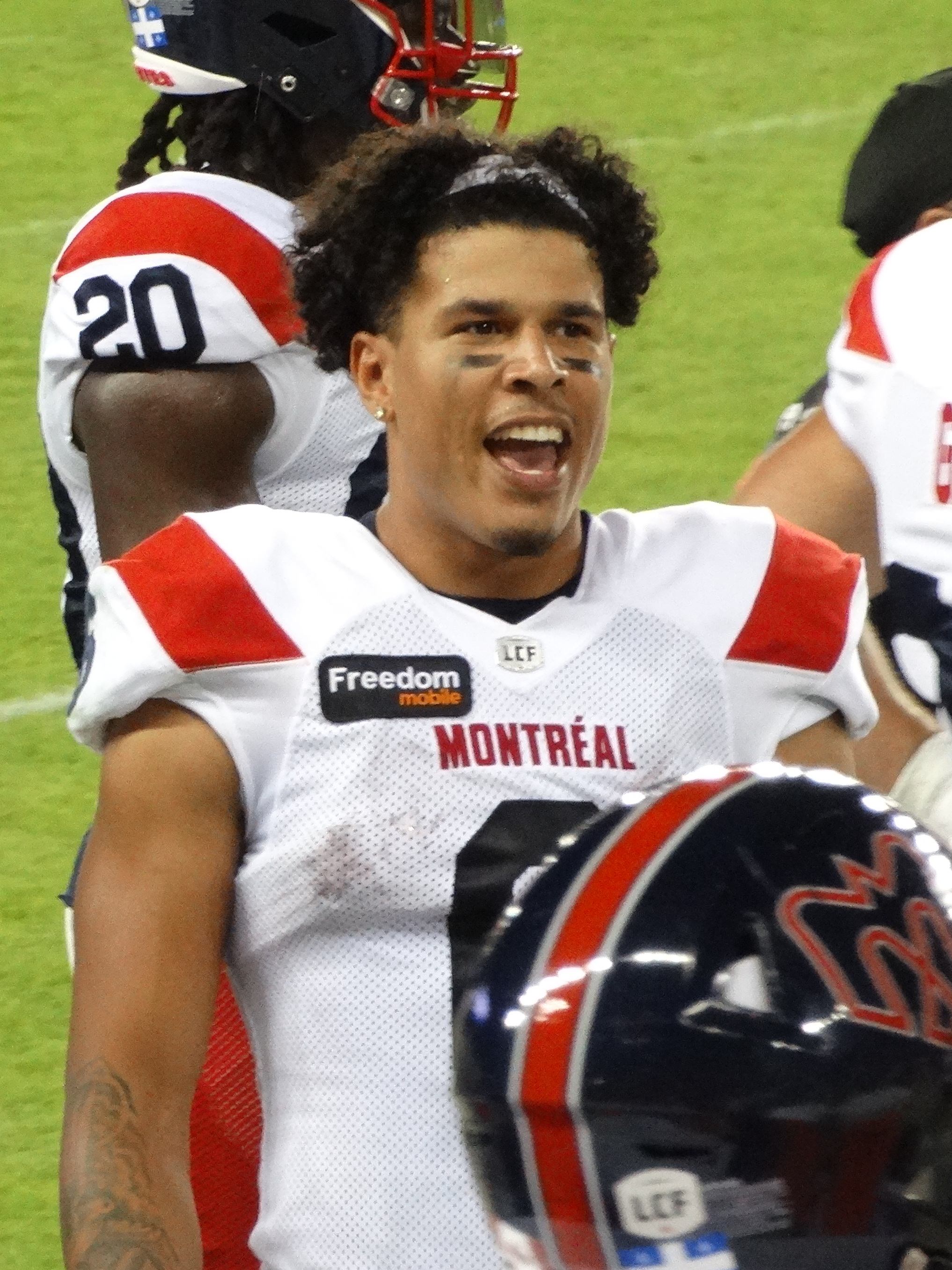
- Philpot with the Montreal Alouettes in 2024

No. 6 – Montreal Alouettes
- Position: Wide receiver
- Roster status: Active
- CFL status: National

Personal information
- Born: July 26, 2000 (age 26); Delta, British Columbia, Canada
- Listed height: 5 ft 11 in (1.80 m)
- Listed weight: 199 lb (90 kg)

Career information
- High school: Seaquam Secondary
- University: Calgary
- CFL draft: 2022: 1st round, 9th overall pick

Career history
- 2022–present: Montreal Alouettes

Awards and highlights
- Grey Cup champion (2023); 2x Grey Cup Most Valuable Canadian (2023, 2026); CFL's Most Outstanding Canadian Award (2026); CFL East All-Star (2026); Frank M. Gibson Trophy 2022; Vanier Cup champion (2019); Peter Gorman Trophy Winner (2018); First-team All-Canadian (2021); CFL Records: Most receiving yards in a season (Canadian Record) = 1,809 (2026)

Career CFL statistics as of 2026
- Games played: 68
- Receptions: 329
- Receiving yards: 4,383
- Receiving touchdowns: 30
- Stats at CFL.ca

Tyson Philpot (born July 26, 2000) is a Canadian professional football wide receiver for the Montreal Alouettes of the Canadian Football League (CFL). He was a number of awards, including the Dick Suderman Trophy (2023 and 2026) and the CFL's Most Outstanding Canadian Award (2026). In 2026, he set the record for most receiving yards in a season by a Canadian with 1,809.

== University career ==
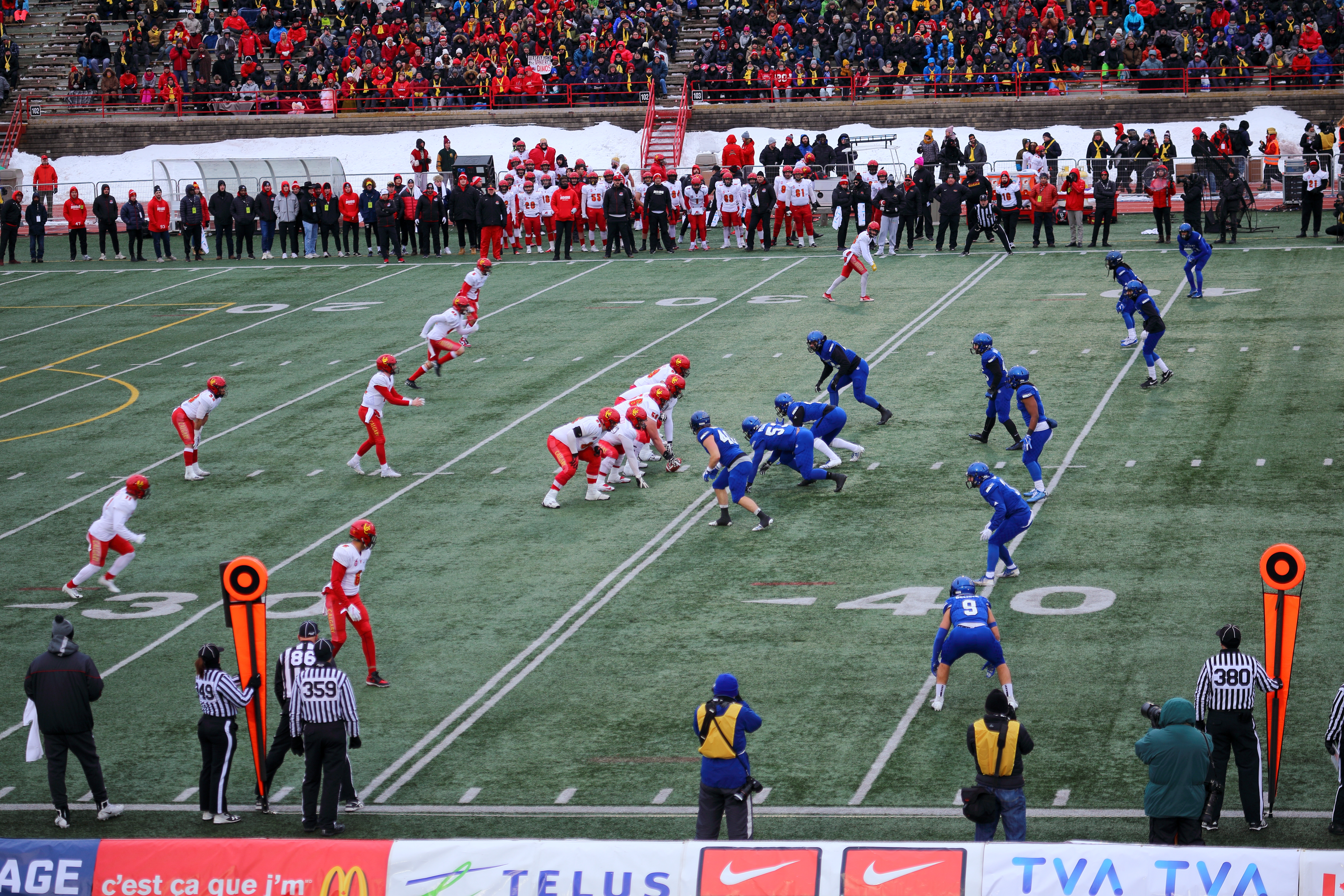
Philpot (6) and the Calgary Dinos in the 55th Vanier Cup

Philpot was recruited by multiple U Sports football programs following high school, and ultimately committed to play for the Calgary Dinos in January 2018. In his rookie year, in 2018, he played in all eight regular season games where he had 32 receptions for 741 yards and four touchdowns. He also recorded the longest catch in program history when he had a 107-yard touchdown reception on September 7, 2018, against the UBC Thunderbirds. At the end of the season, he was named a Canada West All-Star and was awarded the Peter Gorman Trophy as the U Sports Rookie of the Year.

In his sophomore season in 2019, Philpot suffered a foot injury and only played in the first and last games of the regular season where he had four receptions for 87 yards and one touchdown. However, he played in all four post-season games where he had 14 catches for 234 yards and one touchdown. In the 55th Vanier Cup game, he had four catches for 52 yards as the Dinos defeated the Montreal Carabins and Philpot won his first national championship.

Due to the cancellation of the 2020 U Sports football season, Philpot did not play in 2020. However, he returned in 2021, where he finished third in the country with 746 receiving yards from 41 catches and led all of U Sports with nine receiving touchdowns in just six games. He was again named a Canada West All-Star and U Sports First Team All-Canadian, and was also named the Canada West player of the year. However, the Dinos failed to qualify for the playoffs and were unable to defend their Vanier Cup title. For his U Sports career, he played in 16 regular season games where he had 77 receptions for 1,574 yards and 14 touchdowns.

== Professional career ==
Pre-draft measurables
Height	Weight	40-yard dash	20-yard shuttle	Three-cone drill	Vertical jump	Broad jump	Bench press
5 ft 11 3/8 in (1.81 m)	189 lb (86 kg)	4.59 s	4.27 s	7.24 s	30.5 in (0.77 m)	9 ft 5 in (2.87 m)	5 reps
All values from CFL Combine

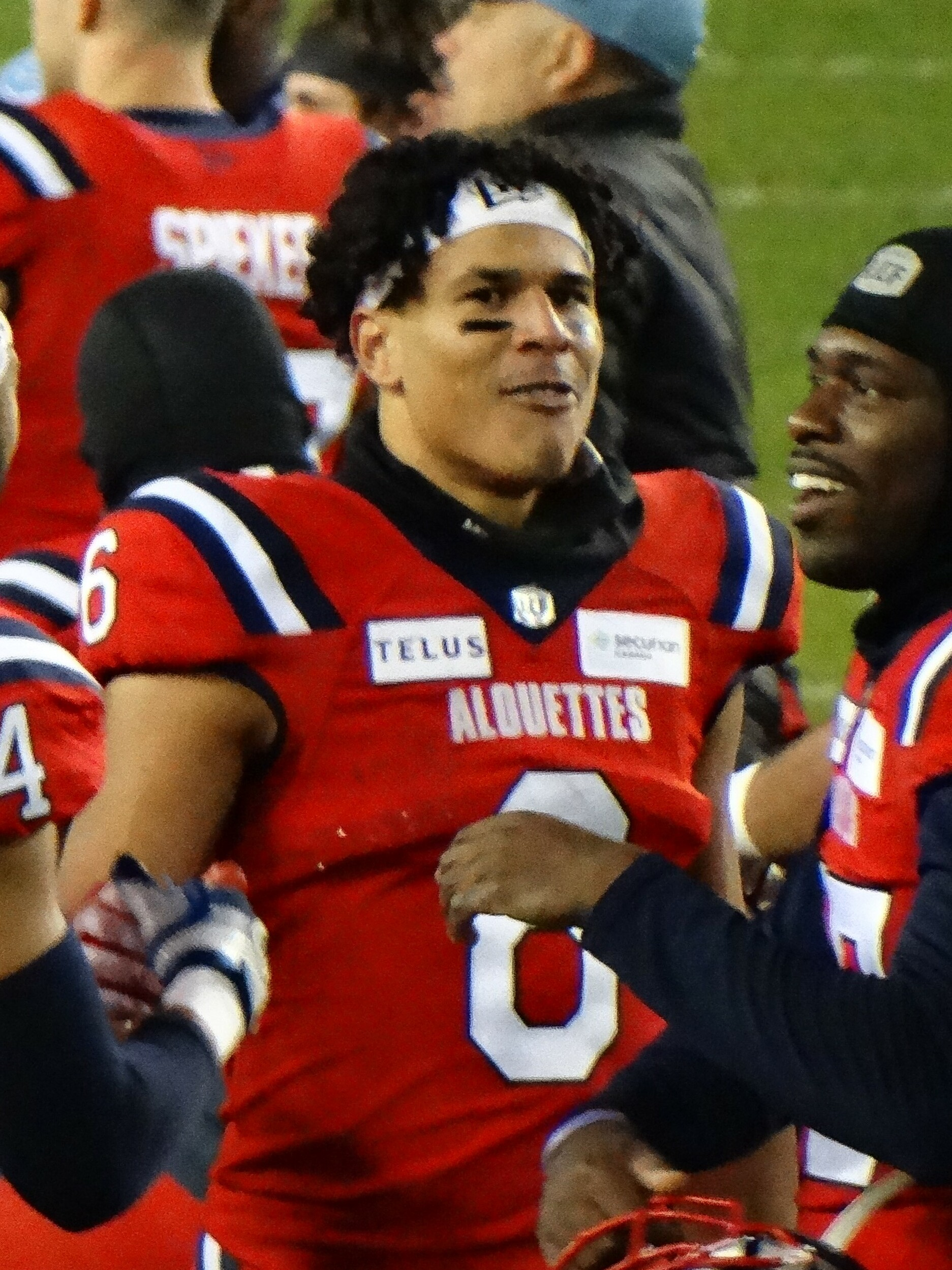
Philpot in 2023

Philpot was ranked as the sixth best player in the Canadian Football League's Amateur Scouting Bureau final rankings for players eligible in the 2022 CFL draft, and third by players in U Sports. He was then drafted in the first round, ninth overall, in the 2022 draft by the Montreal Alouettes and signed with the team on May 13, 2022. Following training camp for the 2022 season, Philpot earned a spot on the team's active roster and made his professional debut on June 9, 2022, against his brother's team, the Calgary Stampeders, where he had five punt returns for 38 yards and two kickoff returns for 63 yards. He scored his first career touchdown on July 14, 2022, against the Edmonton Elks, when he caught a six-yard pass from Trevor Harris. Philpot finished his rookie year having played in all 18 regular season games and recorded 39 receptions for 459 yards and two touchdowns, 11 punt returns for 153 yards, and 12 kickoff returns for 342 yards. For his strong season, he was the East Division's nominee for the CFL's Most Outstanding Rookie Award. He also played in two playoff games in 2022 where he had 12 catches for 161 yards and one touchdown, including his first 100-yard receiving game which occurred in the East Final loss to the Toronto Argonauts. Following the season Philpot had a workout with the Pittsburgh Steelers of the National Football League (NFL), but was not offered a contract.

In 2023, Philpot played in 13 regular season games as he missed five due to injury. He recorded 47 receptions for 532 yards and five touchdowns in the regular season. In the 110th Grey Cup, Philpot caught 6 passes for 63 yards, including the winning touchdown with 13 seconds left, and was named the game's Most Valuable Canadian.

Philpot began the 2026 season at a historic pace. In the season opener against the Hamilton Tiger-Cats, he recorded seven receptions for 76 yards and a touchdown in the win. In his next game against the Toronto Argonauts, he caught nine passes for 193 yards and two touchdowns in a victory. In Week 3 against the Edmonton Elks, he recorded eight receptions for 120 yards in the loss. He then had 12 receptions for 198 yards in a win over the Ottawa Redblacks. In Week 6 against the Calgary Stampeders, he recorded nine receptions for 132 yards and a touchdown. In Week 9 against Ottawa, he needed 161 receiving yards to become the fastest Canadian player to reach the 1,000-yard mark. He finished with nine receptions for 184 yards, becoming the fastest Canadian player to reach the 1,000-yard mark. He also tied Hal Patterson's 1956 and Terry Greer's 1983 record for the fewest games needed to reach 1,000 receiving yards by any player in CFL history. At the conclusion of the regular season, Philpot received the CFL's Most Outstanding Canadian Award.

== Career statistics ==
Legend
	Won the Grey Cup
	Led the league
	CFL record (for Canadians)
**Bold**	Career high

=== Regular season ===
Year	Team	Games		Receiving				Rushing			
Year	Team	GP	GS	Rec	Yds	Avg	TD	Att	Yds	Avg	TD
2022	MTL	18	3	39	459	11.8	2	1	**16**	**16.0**	0
2023	MTL	13	12	47	532	11.3	5	**2**	9	4.5	0
2024	MTL	9	9	58	779	13.4	5	0	0	0.0	0
2025	MTL	17	17	61	804	13.4	5	**2**	9	4.5	0
2026	MTL	16	16	**124**	**1,809**	**14.6**	**13**	1	**16**	**16.0**	0
Career		68	57	329	4,383	13.3	30	6	50	8.3	0

=== Postseason ===
Year	Team	Games		Receiving				Rushing			
Year	Team	GP	GS	Rec	Yds	Avg	TD	Att	Yds	Avg	TD
2022	MTL	2	2	12	161	**13.4**	**1**	0	0	0.0	0
2023	MTL	3	3	15	144	9.6	**1**	0	0	0.0	0
2024	MTL	Did not play due to injury									
2025	MTL	3	3	**20**	**252**	12.6	**1**	**1**	**1**	**1.0**	**1**
CFL career		8	8	47	557	11.9	3	1	1	1.0	1

=== College ===
Year	Team	GP	Receiving				
Year	Team	GP	Rec	Yds	Avg	Lng	TD
2018	CGY	10	37	**886**	**23.9**	**107**	5
2019	CGY	6	18	321	17.8	47	2
2020	CGY	Season cancelled					
2021	CGY	6	**41**	746	18.2	55	**9**
Total		22	96	1,953	20.3	107	16

== Personal life ==
Philpot was born in Delta, British Columbia to parents Colleen Purcell and Cory Philpot. His father played in six seasons in the Canadian Football League as a running back and enrolled Philpot in football when he was six years old. Philpot has a twin brother, Jalen Philpot, who is older by seven minutes, who also plays professionally as a receiver for the Calgary Stampeders.
