= Neil Campbell (Canadian football) =

American gridiron football player (born 2002)

- Campbell with the Montreal Alouettes in 2026

No. 29 – Montreal Alouettes
- Position: Defensive back
- Roster status: Active
- CFL status: American

Personal information
- Born: April 21, 2002 (age 24)
- Listed height: 5 ft 11 in (1.80 m)
- Listed weight: 206 lb (93 kg)

Career information
- High school: Chicago Hope Academy (Chicago, Illinois)
- College: Indiana Wesleyan (2020–2024); UTEP (2025)
- NFL draft: 2026: undrafted

Career history
- Montreal Alouettes (2026–present)

Awards and highlights
- 2× Second-team NAIA All-American (2023, 2024); 3× First-team All-MSFA Mideast (2022–2024); 2× Second-team All-MSFA Mideast (2021, 2023) (Note: Selected in 2023 as return specialist)
- Stats at CFL.ca

Neil Campbell (born April 21, 2002) is an American professional football defensive back for the Montreal Alouettes of the Canadian Football League (CFL). He played college football for the Indiana Wesleyan Wildcats and UTEP Miners.

== Early life ==
Campbell was born on April 21, 2002. He attended Chicago Hope Academy in Chicago.

== College career ==
Campbell played college football for the Indiana Wesleyan Wildcats from 2020 to 2024 and UTEP Miners in 2025. At Indiana Wesleyan, he recorded 212 tackles, including nine for loss, 1.5 sacks, 16 interceptions, 42 pass breakups, one forced fumble, three fumble recoveries and three blocked kicks. In 2023, Campbell served as the primary kick and punt returner, totaling 434 kick return and 195 punt return yards. He was a two-time, second-team National Association of Intercollegiate Athletics All-American in 2023 and 2024.

Campbell transferred to University of Texas at El Paso for the 2025 season, where he played in nine games, registering 56 tackles, including six for loss, two sacks, three pass deflections and one forced fumble.

== Professional career ==
Pre-draft measurables
Height	Weight	Arm length	Hand span	Wingspan	40-yard dash	10-yard split	20-yard split	20-yard shuttle	Three-cone drill	Vertical jump	Broad jump	Bench press
5 ft 11 in (1.80 m)	204 lb (93 kg)	29 1/2 in (0.75 m)	8 3/4 in (0.22 m)	6 ft 0 in (1.83 m)	4.57 s	1.56 s	2.62 s	4.25 s	7.15 s	37 in (0.94 m)	10 ft 2 in (3.10 m)	37 reps
All values from Pro day

On August 4, 2026, the Montreal Alouettes of the Canadian Football League (CFL) signed Campbell to the practice roster. On September 17, he was elevated to the active roster and made his debut the following day. Campbell had six tackles and a pass break up in a win against the Hamilton Tiger-Cats.
