= Jonathan Sutherland (Canadian football) =

Canadian gridiron football player (born 1998)

- Sutherland with the Montreal Alouettes in 2026

No. 0 – Montreal Alouettes
- Positions: Defensive back, linebacker
- Roster status: Active
- CFL status: National

Personal information
- Born: August 9, 1998 (age 28); Ottawa, Ontario, Canada
- Listed height: 6 ft 0 in (1.83 m)
- Listed weight: 214 lb (97 kg)

Career information
- High school: Episcopal (Alexandria, Virginia, U.S.)
- College: Penn State (2017–2022)
- NFL draft: 2023: undrafted
- CFL draft: 2023: 1st round, 5th overall pick

Career history
- Seattle Seahawks (2023–2024)*; New York Giants (2024)*; Las Vegas Raiders (2025)*; Montreal Alouettes (2026–present)
- * Offseason or practice squad member only
- Stats at Pro Football Reference
- Stats at CFL.ca

Jonathan Anthony Sutherland (born August 9, 1998) is a Canadian professional football defensive back and linebacker for the Montreal Alouettes of the Canadian Football League (CFL). He played college football for the Penn State Nittany Lions.

== College career ==
Sutherland played college football for the Penn State Nittany Lions from 2017 to 2022. He played in 58 games, starting in 11, recording 137 tackles, including eight for loss, 1.5 sacks, one interception, five pass deflections, one fumble recovery and one forced fumble.

== Professional career ==
Pre-draft measurables
Height	Weight	Arm length	Hand span	40-yard dash	10-yard split	20-yard split	20-yard shuttle	Three-cone drill	Vertical jump	Broad jump	Bench press
5 ft 11 in (1.80 m)	202 lb (92 kg)	30 3/8 in (0.77 m)	9 1/8 in (0.23 m)	4.58 s	1.64 s	2.65 s	4.21 s	6.96 s	37.5 in (0.95 m)	10 ft 3 in (3.12 m)	25 reps
All values from Pro Day

=== Seattle Seahawks ===
After going undrafted in the 2023 NFL draft, Sutherland signed with the Seattle Seahawks of the National Football League (NFL) as an undrafted free agent. On August 30, he was released by the team with an injury settlement. On October 31, Sutherland was signed to the practice squad. On January 8, 2024, he signed a reserve/futures contract. On July 29, Sutherland was released by the team.

=== New York Giants ===
On August 15, 2024, Sutherland signed with the New York Giants. On August 25, he was released with an injury designation. On August 28, Sutherland was placed on the injured reserve. On March 12, 2025, he became a restricted free agent.

=== Las Vegas Raiders ===
On May 11, 2025, Sutherland signed with the Las Vegas Raiders. He was released by the team on June 13, 2025.

=== Montreal Alouettes ===
Sutherland was selected in the first round, with the fifth overall selection, by the Montreal Alouettes in the 2023 CFL draft. On January 23, 2026, Sutherland signed with the team.
