= Shakespeare Louis =

Canadian gridiron football player (born 2001)

- Louis with the Montreal Alouettes in 2026

No. 22 – Montreal Alouettes
- Position: Defensive back
- Roster status: Active
- CFL status: National

Personal information
- Born: June 10, 2001 (age 25); Ottawa, Ontario, Canada
- Listed height: 5 ft 10 in (1.78 m)
- Listed weight: 188 lb (85 kg)

Career information
- High school: Clearwater Academy (Clearwater, Florida, U.S.)
- College: Robert Morris (2021–2023); Southeastern Louisiana (2024–25)
- CFL draft: 2026: 2nd round, 17th overall pick

Career history
- Montreal Alouettes (2026–present)
- Stats at CFL.ca

Shakespeare Louis (born June 10, 2001) is a Canadian professional football defensive back for the Montreal Alouettes of the Canadian Football League (CFL). He played college football for the Robert Morris Colonials and Southeastern Louisiana Lions.

== Early life ==
Louis was born on June 10, 2001, in Ottawa, Ontario, Canada. He attended Clearwater Academy International in Clearwater, Florida.

== College career ==
Louis played college football for the Robert Morris Colonials from 2021 to 2023 and Southeastern Louisiana Lions from 2024 to 2025. In 20 games for Robert Morris, he made 46 tackles and had four pass breakups. Louis transferred to Southeastern Louisiana in 2024 and redshirted that year. In 2025, he had 44 tackles, one interception, two pass defenses and one forced fumble in 13 games.

== Professional career ==
Pre-draft measurables
| Height | Weight | Arm length | Hand span | Wingspan | 40-yard dash | 10-yard split | 20-yard split | 20-yard shuttle | Three-cone drill | Vertical jump | Broad jump | Bench press |
|---|---|---|---|---|---|---|---|---|---|---|---|---|
| 5 ft 10 in (1.78 m) | 190 lb (86 kg) | 29 5/8 in (0.75 m) | 7 7/8 in (0.20 m) | 6 ft 7/8 in (1.85 m) | 4.60 s | 1.59 s | 2.62 s | 4.45 s | 7.59 s | 31 1/2 in (0.80 m) | 9 ft 4 in (2.84 m) | 20 reps |
All values from Pro day

Louis was selected by the Montreal Alouettes with the 17th overall pick in the second round of the 2026 CFL draft. On May 1, he officially signed with the team. On May 31, Louis was signed to the practice roster. On July 31, he was elevated to the active roster and made his CFL debut on August 8, with one special teams tackle.
