= Cortez Braham =

American football player (born 2000)

No. 0 – Montreal Alouettes
- Position: Wide receiver
- Roster status: Practice roster
- CFL status: American

Personal information
- Born: March 6, 2000 (age 26); Baltimore, Maryland, U.S.
- Listed height: 6 ft 2 in (1.88 m)
- Listed weight: 203 lb (92 kg)

Career information
- High school: Westwood High School
- College: Hutchinson (2019–2021); West Virginia (2022–2023); Nevada (2024); Memphis (2025)
- NFL draft: 2026: undrafted

Career history
- Baltimore Ravens (2026)*; Montreal Alouettes (2026–present)*
- * Offseason or practice squad member only

Awards and highlights
- First-team All-American Conference (2025)

Cortez Braham Jr. (born March 6, 2000) is an American football wide receiver for the Montreal Alouettes of the Canadian Football League (CFL). He played college football for the Hutchinson Blue Dragons, Memphis Tigers, Nevada Wolf Pack, and West Virginia Mountaineers.

== Early life ==
Braham attended Westwood High School in Columbia, South Carolina, and committed to play college football for the Hutchinson Blue Dragons.

== College career ==
=== Hutchinson ===
In three seasons at Hutchinson from 2019 to 2021, Braham put up 68 receptions for 1,387 yards and 17 touchdowns.

=== West Virginia ===
Braham transferred to play for the West Virginia Mountaineers. In two years at West Virginia in 2022 and 2023, he had 17 receptions for 164 yards in 15 games played. After the 2023 season, Braham entered the NCAA transfer portal.

=== Nevada ===
Braham transferred to play for the Nevada Wolf Pack. In 2024, he made 13 starts, recording 56 catches for 724 yards and four touchdowns. After the season, Braham again entered the NCAA transfer portal.

=== Memphis ===
Braham transferred to play for the Memphis Tigers. In week 10 of the 2025 season, he hauled in seven passes for 75 yards and two touchdowns, including the game-winning touchdown versus South Florida. Braham finished the 2025 season with 63 catches for 889 yards and four touchdowns. After the season he declared for the NFL draft.

== Professional career ==
Pre-draft measurables
| Height | Weight | Arm length | Hand span | Wingspan | 40-yard dash | 10-yard split | 20-yard split | 20-yard shuttle | Three-cone drill | Vertical jump | Broad jump |
|---|---|---|---|---|---|---|---|---|---|---|---|
| 6 ft 1 5/8 in (1.87 m) | 203 lb (92 kg) | 33 in (0.84 m) | 8 7/8 in (0.23 m) | 6 ft 6 3/8 in (1.99 m) | 4.57 s | 1.56 s | 2.55 s | 4.52 s | 7.52 s | 32.0 in (0.81 m) | 9 ft 3 in (2.82 m) |
All values from Pro Day

=== Baltimore Ravens ===
After not being selected in the 2026 NFL draft, Braham signed with the Baltimore Ravens as an undrafted free agent. On August 30, Braham was waived.

=== Montreal Alouettes ===
On September 27, 2026, Braham signed with the Montreal Alouettes of the Canadian Football League (CFL).
