= Jean-Marc Edmé =

Canadian football administrator (born 1980)

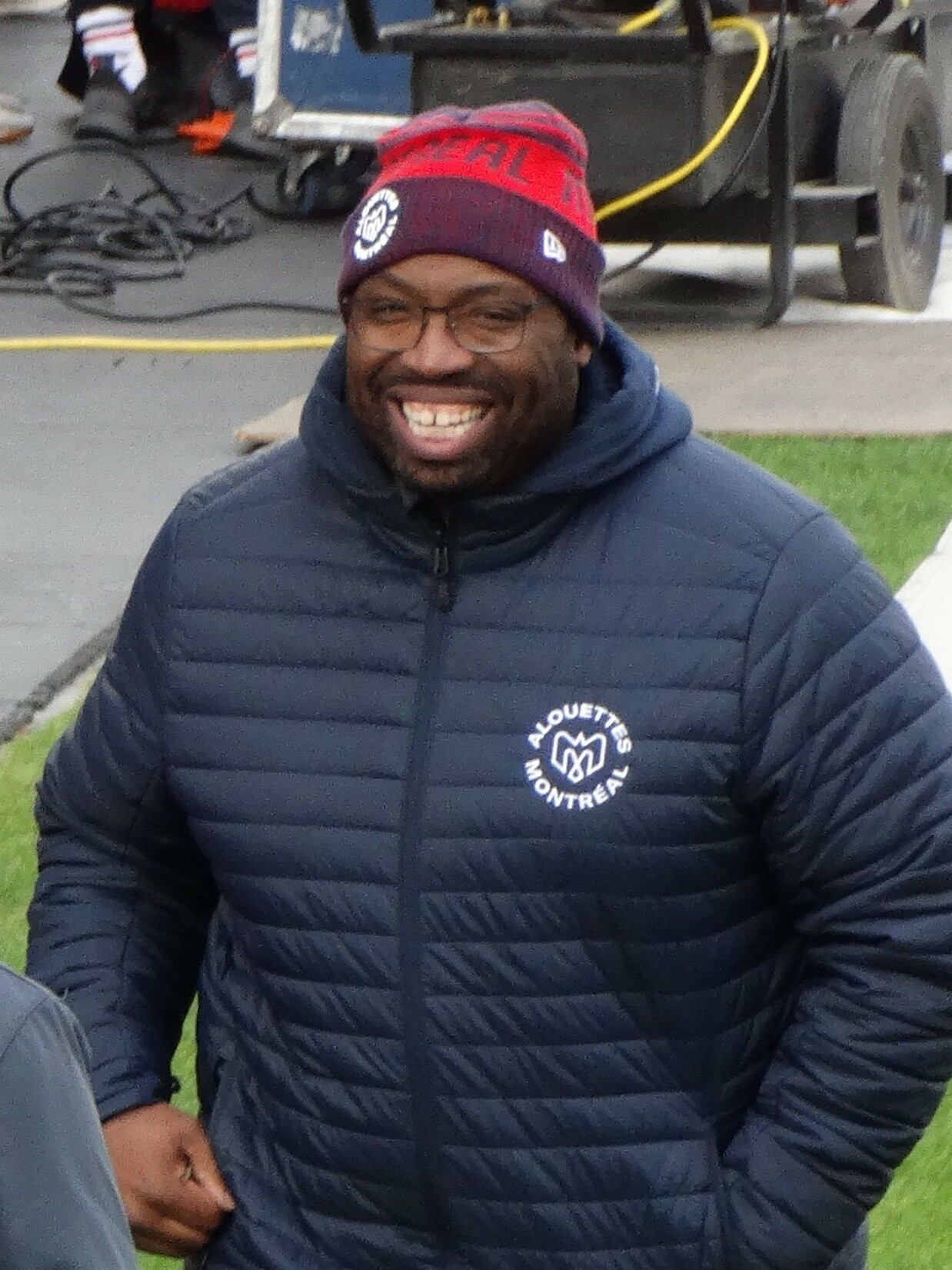
- Edmé with the Montreal Alouettes in 2022

Montreal Alouettes
- Title: Senior personnel executive

Personal information
- Born: March 23, 1980 (age 46); Montreal, Quebec, Canada

Career information
- Position: Fullback
- College: Alcorn State
- University: Sherbrooke

Career history

Playing
- 2007: Hamilton Tiger-Cats*
- * Offseason or practice squad member only

Coaching
- 2007: Hamilton Tiger-Cats (Assistant coach)
- 2008–2012: Montreal Alouettes (Defensive assistant coach)

Operations
- 2007: Hamilton Tiger-Cats (Football Operations Intern)
- 2008–2012: Montreal Alouettes (Scout)
- 2013–2015: Montreal Alouettes (Pro/College/Advance Scout)
- 2016–2017: Ottawa Redblacks (Player Personnel Coordinator)
- 2017–2021: Ottawa Redblacks (Director of Player Personnel)
- 2022–2023: Montreal Alouettes (Director of Pro Personnel)
- 2024–present: Montreal Alouettes (Senior Personnel Executive)

Awards and highlights
- 4× Grey Cup champion (2009, 2010, 2016, 2023)

Jean-Marc Edmé (born March 23, 1980) is the Senior Personnel Executive for the Montreal Alouettes of the Canadian Football League (CFL). He is a four-time Grey Cup champion, having won two as a coach and a scout with the Alouettes, once with the Ottawa Redblacks as the team's Player Personnel Coordinator in 2016, and again with the Alouettes in 2023 as the Director of Pro Personnel.

== Playing career ==
Edmé played college football for the Alcorn State Braves on a scholarship for two years, but injuries limited his playing time. He then transferred to the Université de Sherbrooke to play for the Vert et Or following the revival of the school's football program in 2003.

He was briefly added to the practice roster of the Hamilton Tiger-Cats in October 2007.

== Canadian Football League career ==
After first joining the Hamilton Tiger-Cats as an administrative intern in 2007, Edmé was also named an assistant coach to then-head coach Charlie Taaffe's staff. On May 2, 2008, he was named a defensive assistant coach for the Montreal Alouettes while also serving as a scout for the team. He was a member of two Grey Cup-winning teams in 2009 and 2010. After the team's head coach, Marc Trestman, left the team following the 2012 season, Edmé shifted solely to scout duties as the team's Pro/College and Advance scout in 2013.

On January 19, 2016, it was announced that Edmé had been hired by the Ottawa Redblacks to serve as the team's Player Personnel Coordinator. In his first year with the Redblacks, the team won the 104th Grey Cup. On May 11, 2017, it was announced that he had been promoted to Ottawa's Director of Player Personnel. He spent six years with the Redblacks, but was not retained following the 2021 season.

On January 5, 2022, it was announced that Edmé had been hired by the Montreal Alouettes to serve as the team's Director of Pro Personnel.

On January 11, 2024, Edmé was named the team's senior personnel executive.

== Personal life ==
Edmé has two brothers and his younger brother, Alexandre, played football for the Laval Rouge et Or. Edmé obtained a bachelor's degree in Sports Administration at Laurentian University.
