= Liam Talbot (Canadian football) =

Canadian gridiron football player (born 2003)

No. 30 – Montreal Alouettes
- Position: Running back
- Roster status: Active
- CFL status: National

Personal information
- Born: September 14, 2003 (age 23)
- Listed height: 5 ft 11 in (1.80 m)
- Listed weight: 205 lb (93 kg)

Career information
- High school: St. Andre Bessette Catholic (London, Ontario)
- University: Windsor (2022–2025)
- CFL draft: 2026: 4th round, 37th overall pick

Career history
- Montreal Alouettes (2026–present)
- Stats at CFL.ca

Liam Talbot (born September 14, 2003) is a Canadian professional football running back for the Montreal Alouettes of the Canadian Football League (CFL). He played U Sports football for the Windsor Lancers.

== U Sports career ==
Talbot played U Sports football for the Windsor Lancers from 2022 to 2025. He played in 29 games, where he rushed for 641 yards, four touchdowns, 18 receptions for 158 and one touchdown, 1,182 return yards and one punt return touchdown.

== Professional career ==
Pre-draft measurables
Height	Weight	20-yard shuttle	Three-cone drill	Vertical jump	Broad jump
5 ft 11 in (1.80 m)	209 lb (95 kg)	4.22 s	7.12 s	34 in (0.86 m)	9 ft 7 1/4 in (2.93 m)
All values from CFL Combine

Talbot was selected by the Montreal Alouettes with the 37th overall pick in the fourth round of the 2026 CFL draft. On May 4, he officially signed with the team. On May 30, Talbot was signed to the practice roster. He recorded his first rush for four yards in Week 7, against the Calgary Stampeders. In Week 14, he scored his first CFL touchdown against the BC Lions.
