= Anthony Vandal =

Canadian gridiron football player (born 1998)

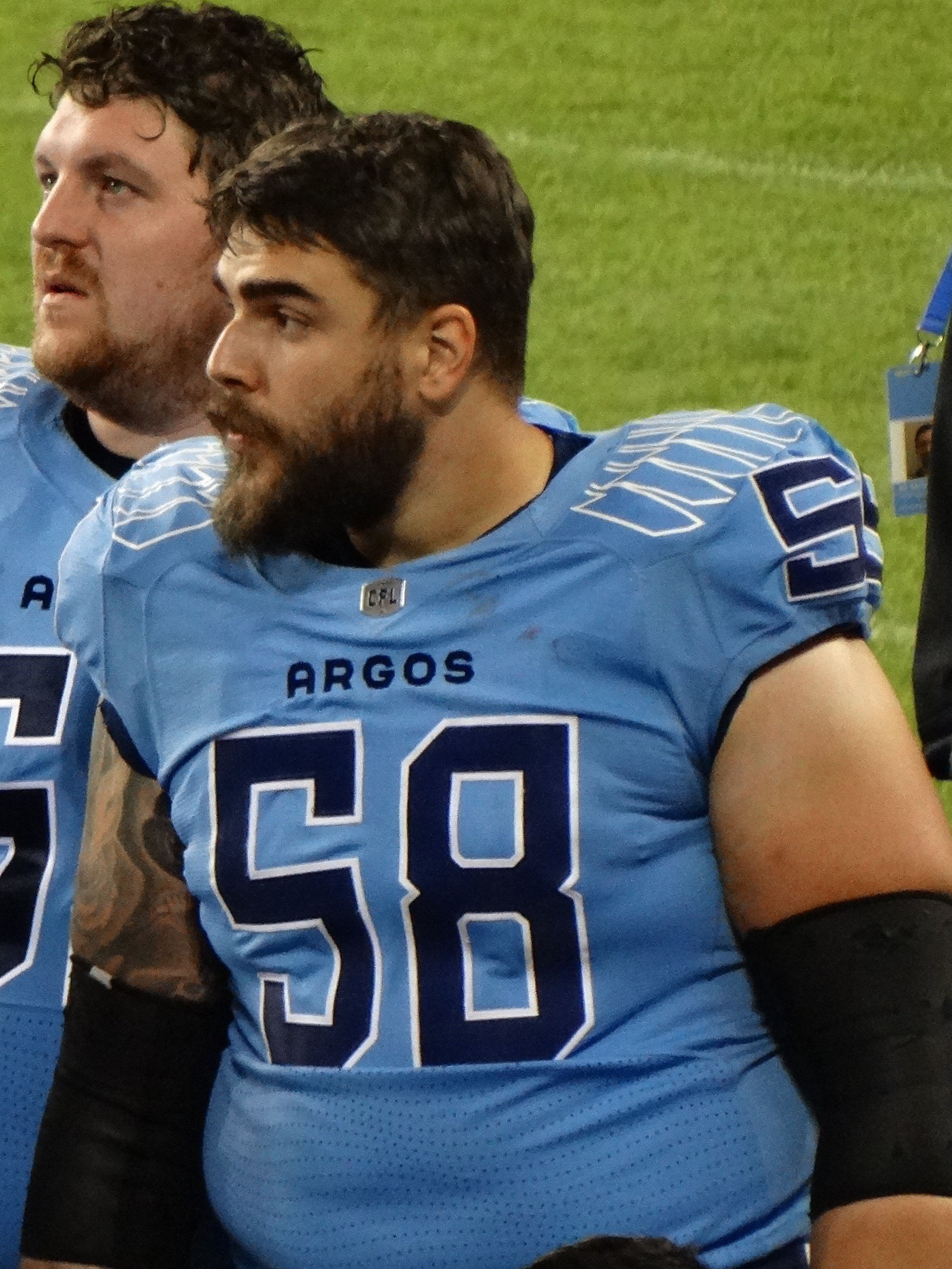
- Vandal with the Toronto Argonauts in 2024

Montreal Alouettes
- Position: Offensive lineman
- CFL status: National

Personal information
- Born: June 3, 1998 (age 28); Sorel-Tracy, Quebec, Canada
- Listed height: 6 ft 4 in (1.93 m)
- Listed weight: 325 lb (147 kg)

Career information
- High school: Seminaire Saint-Joseph
- CEGEP: Cégep de Lévis
- University: Sherbrooke
- CFL draft: 2023: 8th round, 72nd overall pick

Career history
- 2023: Toronto Argonauts*
- 2024–2025: Toronto Argonauts
- 2026–present: Montreal Alouettes
- * Offseason or practice squad member only

Awards and highlights
- Grey Cup champion (2024); Second-team All-Canadian (2022)
- Stats at CFL.ca

Anthony Vandal (born June 3, 1998) is a Canadian professional football offensive lineman for the Montreal Alouettes of the Canadian Football League (CFL).

== University career ==
Vandal played U Sports football for the Sherbrooke Vert & Or from 2018 to 2023. He was named the RSEQ Rookie of the Year in 2018 and was an RSEQ All-Star three times. In 2022, he was named a U Sports Second Team All-Canadian.

== Professional career ==
Pre-draft measurables
Height	Weight	40-yard dash	20-yard shuttle	Three-cone drill	Vertical jump	Broad jump	Bench press
6 ft 4 in (1.93 m)	297 lb (135 kg)	5.56 s	4.88 s	8.00 s	24.5 in (0.62 m)	7 ft 11 1/2 in (2.43 m)	12 reps
All values from CFL Combine

=== Toronto Argonauts ===
Vandal was drafted in the eighth round, 72nd overall, with the last pick in the 2023 CFL draft by the Toronto Argonauts. He then signed with the team on May 5, 2023. Following training camp, he was placed on the suspended list and was eventually released as he returned to the Vert & Or to complete his U Sports eligibility. He re-signed with the Argonauts on November 22, 2023.

Following training camp in 2024, Vandal made the opening day roster as a backup offensive lineman and made his professional debut on June 9, 2024, against the BC Lions. Following an injury to Gregor MacKellar, Vandal made his first professional start on August 9, 2024, against the Calgary Stampeders. He played in all 18 regular season games and started the last ten, and did not relinquish his starting position when MacKellar returned from injury. Vandal played and started in all three post-season games, including the 111th Grey Cup where the Argonauts defeated the Winnipeg Blue Bombers 41–24.

On May 31, 2026, Vandal was released by the Argonauts as part of final roster cuts.

=== Montreal Alouettes ===
On June 8, 2026, it was announced that Vandal had signed with the Montreal Alouettes.
