= Ty Anderson (Canadian football) =

Canadian gridiron football player (born 2002)

- Anderson with the Hamilton Tiger-Cats in 2025

No. 40 – Montreal Alouettes
- Position: Defensive tackle
- Roster status: Practice roster
- CFL status: National

Personal information
- Born: October 26, 2002 (age 24); Calgary, Alberta, Canada
- Listed height: 6 ft 2 in (1.88 m)
- Listed weight: 283 lb (128 kg)

Career information
- High school: Centennial (Calgary)
- University: Alberta (2020–2024)
- CFL draft: 2025: 4th round, 36th overall pick

Career history
- Hamilton Tiger-Cats (2025–2026); Montreal Alouettes (2026–present)

Awards and highlights
- Canada West All-Star (2024)

Career CFL statistics as of 2026
- Games played: 10
- Stats at CFL.ca

Ty Anderson (born October 26, 2002) is a Canadian professional football defensive tackle for the Montreal Alouettes of the Canadian Football League (CFL). He played U Sports football for the Alberta Golden Bears.

== Early life ==
Anderson was born on October 26, 2002, in Calgary, Alberta. He attended Centennial High School in Calgary.

== University career ==
Anderson played U Sports football for the Alberta Golden Bears from 2020 to 2024. He played in 31 games over his career, recording 74 tackles, including 5.5 for loss, one sack, three pass deflections, two forced fumbles, one fumble recovery and two blocked kicks. Anderson was a Canada West All-Star as a senior.

== Professional career ==
Pre-draft measurables
Height	Weight	20-yard shuttle	Three-cone drill	Vertical jump	Broad jump	Bench press
6 ft 5 3/4 in (1.97 m)	314 lb (142 kg)	4.76 s	7.89 s	27.5 in (0.70 m)	8 ft 3 in (2.51 m)	18 reps
All values from CFL Combine

=== Hamilton Tiger-Cats ===
Anderson was selected in the fourth round, with the 36th overall selection, by the Hamilton Tiger-Cats in the 2025 CFL draft. On June 1, he was signed to the practice roster. On August 15, Anderson was elevated to the active roster in a depth role. On August 25, he was placed on the practice roster. On August 30, Anderson was promoted to the active roster and played in ten games, recording no statistics. On May 31, 2026, he was released by the team.

=== Montreal Alouettes ===
On June 8, 2026, Anderson was signed to the practice roster of the Montreal Alouettes. On August 4, he was signed to the active roster and played in one game before he reverted to the practice roster on August 17.
