= 113th Grey Cup =

2026 Canadian Football championship game

Montreal Alouettes	Edmonton Elks
(14–4)	(13–5)
30	37
Head coach: Jason Maas	Head coach: Mark Kilam
	1	2	3	4	Total
Montreal Alouettes	10	7	7	6	30
Edmonton Elks	7	14	10	6	37
- Date: November 15, 2026
- Stadium: McMahon Stadium
- Location: Calgary
- Most Valuable Player: Cody Fajardo, QB (Elks)
- Most Valuable Canadian: Tyson Philpot, WR (Alouettes)
- Favourite: Alouettes by 3 1/2
- National anthem: Sarah McLachlan
- Coin toss: Jennie Carignan
- Referee: Ben Major
- Halftime show: Riley Green
- Attendance: 32,419

Broadcasters
- Network: Canada (English): CTV, TSN, Crave; Canada (French): RDS; Worldwide: CFL+, DAZN
- Announcers: Rod Smith (TSN play-by-play); Glen Suitor (TSN analyst); Claire Hanna (TSN sideline reporter); Matthew Scianitti (TSN sideline reporter); David Arsenault (RDS play-by-play); Pierre Vercheval (RDS analyst); Didier Orméjuste (RDS sideline reporter)
- Ratings: 4,000,000

The 113th Grey Cup was a Canadian football game played to decide the Canadian Football League (CFL) championship for the 2026 season. The game was played on November 15, 2026, at McMahon Stadium in Calgary, Alberta. It was the sixth time that Calgary hosted the Grey Cup, with the previous being in 2019. The West Division champion Edmonton Elks defeated the East Division champion Montreal Alouettes 37–30. This was their first Grey Cup win since 2015 and first since changing their team name in 2021.

In the regular season, the Elks finished first in their division with a 13–5 record. The Alouettes had finished with the best overall record in the league, 14–4, and were appearing in their third Grey Cup game in four years. These teams had previously met in the Grey Cup 11 times, of which Edmonton had won eight. Elks starting quarterback Cody Fajardo faced his former team, the Alouettes, who had traded him to Edmonton in 2024, after he was the Grey Cup MVP in 2023.

There were six lead changes during the game, tying a Grey Cup record. The Elks had seven scoring drives; the Alouettes kept pace until 1:42 remaining in the game, when they turned the ball over on downs. Edmonton then kicked a field goal to extend their lead to 37–27, effectively sealing the win. Fajardo was named the game's MVP, after throwing two passing touchdowns and two rushing touchdowns.

The game was televised in Canada nationally on CTV, TSN, Crave, and RDS. An average of four million viewers watched the game across these platforms, equalling the viewership figures from the previous year. The Canadian Forces Snowbirds made their final public flyover with the CT-114 Tutor during the national anthem.

== Host ==
The Edmonton Elks and Calgary Stampeders submitted bids in September 2024 to host the Grey Cup game in 2026. The Elks plan required renovation of their Commonwealth Stadium. The league announced in November 2024 that Calgary had been selected as host.

The same announcement set the date of the game as November 15, the earliest date that a Grey Cup championship game has been played. It was the fifth consecutive season that the Grey Cup was held on the third Sunday in November.

== Entertainment ==
Before kickoff, a performance was given by Canadian singer-songwriters Jim Cuddy and Greg Keelor of Blue Rodeo, followed by the James Barker Band. The national anthem was sung by Canadian singer-songwriter Sarah McLachlan. This was followed by a flypast by the Snowbirds aerobatic team, in their final public display using the Canadair CT-114 Tutor aircraft. A half-time show featured American country singer Riley Green.

== Teams ==
The game featured the Montreal Alouettes, playing in their 21st Grey Cup game, and their third in four years, facing the Edmonton Elks playing in their 24th Grey Cup match and their first since winning in 2015.

=== Edmonton Elks ===
The Elks finished in first place in the West Division with a 13–5 record after finishing in fifth place with a 7–11 record the year prior, becoming the first team in league history to go from fifth place to first place in the division in the span of one season. After starting 0–2 for the previous five seasons, the Elks opened their season with three consecutive wins, including an overtime victory over the defending East Division champion Alouettes. The team was led in early in the year by the play of running back Justin Rankin, who was on pace for 1,000 yards both rushing and receiving after six games. The Elks started the season 6–1 before losing to the defending champion Saskatchewan Roughriders and the Alouettes in back-to-back weeks. The team later qualified for the playoffs for the first time since 2019 and for the first time since changing their team moniker to Elks following their victory over the Calgary Stampeders in the Labour Day Rematch. In Week 20, the Elks clinched first place in the West Division with a victory over the Winnipeg Blue Bombers which was their first Division title since 2015. The team finished with a 7–2 record in the last nine regular season games, including a loss in the final game of the season when the Elks were resting starters.

During the season, the Elks were led by CFL's Most Outstanding Player Finalist, Cody Fajardo, who finished with a career-high 4,788 passing yards and 25 passing yards in 17 starts along with 517 rushing yards and eight touchdowns. Rankin finished the season second in rushing with 1,170 yards and also had 640 receiving yards with ten scrimmage touchdowns. Placekicker Vincent Blanchard set a franchise record with 55 field goals and led the league in field goal accuracy with 93.2% while setting a single game record with nine field goals made in week 17's overtime victory over the Hamilton Tiger-Cats. The Elks led the West Division with nine players named as divisional all-stars.

In their first Division Final since 2019, the Elks hosted the BC Lions in their first playoff meeting since 2011. The first half was prominently a defensive battle as the teams exchanged field goals with the Lions leading 9–6 at the half. The Elks then owned the third quarter with ten points punctuated by Fajardo's 5-yard rushing touchdown near the end of the quarter. BC quickly responded with a Nathan Rourke rushing touchdown a couple of minutes later, tying the game at 16–16. The Elks then scored 12 unanswered points to secure the West Final victory by a score of 28–16, led by Fajardo who had 25 completions on 30 attempts for 274 yards and a passing touchdown with 84 rushing yards and a rushing touchdown.

=== Montreal Alouettes ===
The Alouettes during the 2026 season.

The Alouettes finished in first place in the East Division with a 14–4 record and qualified for the playoffs for the seventh consecutive year. The team began the year with a 9–1 record with the only loss coming in overtime to the Edmonton Elks. In week 7, quarterback Davis Alexander broke Darian Durant's record for most consecutive pass attempts without an interception and finished with a 356-pass attempt streak before throwing his first pick. In a weak East Division, the Alouettes clinch a playoff berth and home playoff game after they defeated the BC Lions on Labour Day Weekend. team then clinched first place in the East in week 18 against the Winnipeg Blue Bombers in the same game where Tyson Philpot broke a franchise record for most receptions in a season. The Alouettes finished with a perfect record at home with their four losses occurring on the road.

With first place secured, the team rested starters in their final games, with several players enjoying outstanding seasons. Alexander played in 16 games where he had 5,257 passing yards with a 72.1% completion percentage for 35 touchdown passes and just four interceptions. Alexander finished with the third-best passer efficiency rating in a season in league history with 122.7, the second-best touchdown-to-interception ratio with 8.75, and the second-lowest interception rate of all time with 0.76%. Throughout the season, Philpot was on pace to break the single-season league record for receiving yards, but he also sat out for the final two games of the year and finished with 1,809 yards on 124 receptions along with 13 receiving touchdowns. While both players were nominated for the CFL's Most Outstanding Player Award in the first year that teammates were eligible as finalists, Alexander was named the league MOP while Philpot was awarded the CFL's Most Outstanding Canadian. Tyler Snead also had an excellent season as he recorded 95 receptions for 1,474 yards and 13 touchdowns as he finished second in the league in receiving yards. All three players were named East Division All-Stars along with 12 other Alouettes players as Montreal led the league in divisional all-star awards.

The Alouettes played in the East Final for the fifth straight season where they faced the Winnipeg Blue Bombers for the second consecutive post-season. The Alouettes asserted their dominance as they jumped out to a 20–3 lead highlighted by an eight-yard touchdown catch by starting right guard Donny Ventrelli. However, the Blue Bombers were able to close the gap with two touchdowns by Bryce Perkins to bring the score to 26–23 for Montreal. With the Blue Bombers in field goal range, star linebacker Tyrice Beverette forced and recovered a fumble from Zach Collaros to prevent another score. The Alouettes then marched the ball downfield and secured the victory with a highlight-reel 21-yard touchdown catch by Snead. Alexander had 373 passing yard and two touchdowns while Philpot had nine receptions for 129 yards.

=== Head-to-head ===
The two teams met twice in the regular season with the each team winning once at home. In the first game, in week 3, the Elks defeated the Alouettes 32–29 in overtime as Edmonton's running back, Justin Rankin, finished with 179 yards and two touchdowns. The Elks had started the season with a pair of victories for the first time since 2019, when current Alouettes' head coach, Jason Maas, was their head coach. The loss was the first for Alouettes' quarterback, Davis Alexander, as his starter record fell to 12–1. As the game headed to overtime, the Alouettes scored a field goal, while the Elks responded with a Cody Fajardo touchdown. The teams met again in Montreal in week 10 where the Alouettes won decisively 48–30. Alexander threw for 352 yards with four passing touchdown, one interception, and one rushing touchdown, while Tyson Philpot had 10 receptions for 131 yards and three touchdowns and Tyler Snead had five catches for 146 yards and one touchdown.

This game will feature Fajardo playing the Alouettes who had traded him to Edmonton after the 2024 season; just one year removed from winning a Grey Cup with the club. Elks' receivers Austin Mack and Kaion Julien-Grant also won the 2023 Grey Cup with the Alouettes and will be facing their former club in this game. Alouettes' head coach, Jason Maas, will face the Elks who had fired him as head coach after leading them from 2016 to 2019 and three playoff appearances while also playing for the team from 2000 to 2005 and again from 2008 to 2011. The Alouettes' general manager, Danny Maciocia, was also the head coach for Edmonton from 2005 to 2008 where he most notably won the Grey Cup for them in 2005.

This game is the 12th meeting between the two clubs in the Grey Cup championship with Edmonton owning an 8–3 record in the previous 11 matchups. This is the most frequent matchup between clubs in the Grey Cup, with the Blue Bombers and Tiger-Cats being the second-most common with nine. Edmonton won the first three contests with the Alouettes, winning consecutively in 1954, 1955, and 1956 which were also the first three Grey Cups won in franchise history. The two teams met again in the 1970s with the Alouettes winning in 1974 and 1977 with the latter being dubbed the "Ice Bowl" as the Alouettes gained a competitive advantage by affixing staples on their shoes to gain better traction on the slick playing surface. Edmonton won in 1975, 1978, and 1979, as part of their dynasty that saw the club win five consecutive Grey Cup games. After the Alouettes were inactive from 1987 to 1995, the two teams met again in 2002, 2003, and 2005 with Edmonton winning the last two and most recent meetings between the clubs.

=== Uniforms ===
The designated home team will be the West Division champion Edmonton Elks, who had first choice of uniforms. The Elks wore gold helmets, standard green jerseys, and gold pants while using the Calgary Stampeders' home locker room. The Alouettes wore navy helmets, white jerseys, and navy pants.

== Game summary ==
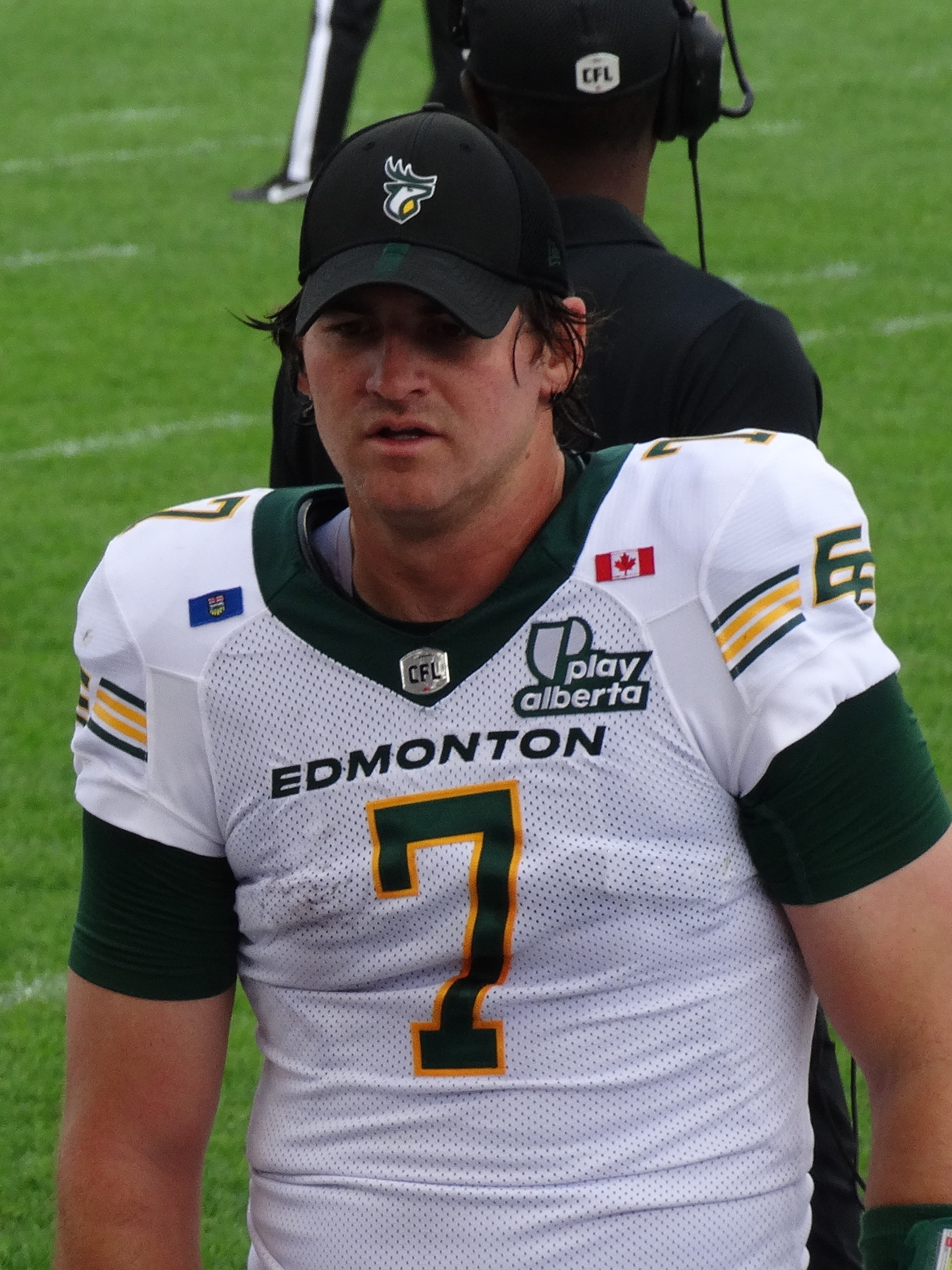
Cody Fajardo was the game's MVP.

The Edmonton Elks won the coin toss and elected to receive the opening kickoff which yielded immediate results as kick returner Montrell Washington ran the kick back 78 yards to the Montreal Alouettes' 11-yard line. After a pass interference penalty by Kabion Ento brought the ball to the one-yard line, Cody Fajardo scored on a one-yard touchdown run. In response, the Alouettes completed an eight-play scoring drive that culminated in a 26-yard touchdown pass from Davis Alexander that featured Tyson Philpot evading defenders for 20 yards after the catch for the score. After a two-and-out by Edmonton, Montreal marched the ball down to the Elks' 10-yard line before settling for a 18-yard field goal by José Maltos Díaz. The Elks responded with another touchdown drive capped by another Fajardo one-yard rushing major early in the second quarter.

After a penalty on the ensuing kickoff, the Alouettes began their drive on their own nine-yard line, but effectively moved up the field. On second down and inches, short-yardage quarterback Caleb Evans entered the game and attempted a deep pass to an open Philpot, but the pass sailed just past the receiver. Four plays later, the Alouettes were forced to punt. On Edmonton's second play on the next drive, at their own 20-yard line, Fajardo attempted a deep pass that was intercepted by Ento and returned to the Elks' 37-yard line. The Alouettes then advanced to the goal line in four plays, with Evans scoring a touchdown on a one-yard sneak. With 3:25 left in the half, the Elks began their drive on their own 28-yard line, but marched down the field, aided by two Fajardo runs and capped off by Fajardo's 11-yard touchdown pass to Joshua Cephus. Montreal got the ball back with 34 seconds in the half, but were unable to move into field goal position with the Elks leading the Alouettes 21–17 at halftime.

The Alouettes received the ball to open the second half and opened with three big plays that included a 21-yard catch by Philpot, a 17-yard carry by Alexander, and another run by Stevie Scott for 19 yards. The drive was punctuated by a 10-yard run by Alexander for a touchdown and the Alouettes took the lead 24–21. After getting the ball back, the Elks again marched the ball down the field, highlighted by a 19-yard run by ShunDerrick Powell, and capped the 11-play drive with a Fajardo touchdown pass to Cephus at the back of the endzone. After a two-and-out by the Alouettes, the Elks were able to get into field goal range after a Justin Rankin 15-yard reception brought the ball to the Montreal 41-yard line. Kicker Vincent Blanchard then connected on a 48-yard field goal to make the score 31–24 in favour of Edmonton near the end of the third quarter.

The Alouettes began their next drive on their own 40-yard line and a pass interference penalty by Terez Reid, who was filling in for the injured Tyrell Ford, brought the ball to Edmonton's 48-yard line. A 13-yard catch by Tyler Snead and two runs by Scott had Montreal at the Edmonton 16-yard line, but the Alouettes had to settle for a 25-yard field goal after an incomplete pass by Alexander. The Elks's leading receiver from the regular season, Austin Mack, had his first catch of the game for 15 yards on the next drive to bring Edmonton to Montreal's 51-yard line. Fajardo then completed a short pass to Brendan O'Leary-Orange for 19 yards, but Don Callis forced a fumble which was recovered by Montreal's Isaac Adeyemi-Berglund at their own 32-yard line. However, the Alouettes were unable to capitalize and were forced to punt three plays later. Edmonton punted the ball back after their drive stalled at their own 54-yard line and Montreal got the ball back at their own 15-yard line. Scott had his longest run of the night with a 31-yard carry, putting him over 100 yards rushing for the game, but the Alouettes were stopped again shortly after and punted with 3:29 remaining in the game.

The Elks began their next drive at their own 19-yard line and had back-to-back big plays from Rankin with a 16-yard run and a 23-yard run that had another 15 yards added on due to a Wesley Sutton facemask penalty. Edmonton extended their lead to seven with a 42-yard field goal and Montreal got the ball back with 2:07 left to play. Facing third-and-three, Alexander attempted a short pass to Snead that was initially ruled an interception return touchdown by Kordell Jackson but was later revised to an incomplete pass and a turnover on downs. The Elks took possession at Montreal's 41-yard line and soon after kicked a 43-yard field goal to extend their lead to 37–27. With 59 seconds remaining, the Alouettes took seven plays to move the ball into field goal range, with Montreal electing to kick a 50-yarder to make it a one-possession game with one second remaining. The desperation onside kick attempt was recovered by Mack and the Elks won by a final score of 37–30.

Fajardo was named the Grey Cup Most Valuable Player after completing 16 of 22 pass attempts for 199 yards with two touchdown passes and one interception. He also had 12 carries for 45 yards and two rushing touchdowns. Philpot was awarded the Grey Cup Most Valuable Canadian in a losing effort as he had seven catches for 80 yards and a touchdown along with two kickoff returns for 56 yards.

=== Scoring summary ===
First quarter

EDM – TD Fajardo 1-yard run (Blanchard convert) (13:45) 7–0 EDM
MTL – TD Philpot 17-yard reception from Alexander (Maltos Díaz convert) (9:09) 7–7
MTL – FG Maltos Díaz 18 yards (3:20) 10–7 MTL

Second quarter

EDM – TD Fajardo 1-yard run (Blanchard convert) (13:37) 14–10 EDM
MTL – TD Evans 1-yard run (Maltos Díaz convert) (4:04) 17–14 MTL
EDM – TD Cephus 11-yard reception from Fajardo (Blanchard convert) (0:44) 21–17 EDM

Third quarter

MTL – TD Alexander 10-yard run (Maltos Díaz convert) (11:55) 24–21 MTL
EDM – TD Cephus 5-yard reception from Fajardo (Blanchard convert) (5:28) 28–24 EDM
EDM – FG Blanchard 48 yards (0:26) 31–24 EDM

Fourth quarter

MTL – FG Maltos Díaz 25 yards (12:23) 31–27 EDM
EDM – FG Blanchard 42 yards (2:17) 34–27 EDM
EDM – FG Blanchard 43 yards (1:09) 37–27 EDM
MTL – FG Maltos Díaz 50 yards (0:05) 37–30 EDM

=== Individual statistics ===
Sources: CFL 113th Grey Cup Boxscore

Elks passing
Player	CP/AT	Pct	Yards	TD	Int
(United States) Cody Fajardo	16/22	72.7%	199	2	1
Elks rushing
Player	Car	Yards	Avg	Lg	TD
(United States) Justin Rankin	13	85	6.5	23	0
(United States) Cody Fajardo	12	45	3.8	13	2
(United States) ShunDerrick Powell	7	45	6.4	19	0
Elks receiving
Player	Rec	Yards	Avg	Lg	TD
(Canada) Brendan O'Leary-Orange	4	44	11.0	19	0
(United States) Joshua Cephus	4	43	10.8	15	2
(Canada) Zach Mathis	3	38	12.7	18	0
(United States) Joe Robustelli	2	38	19.0	29	0
(United States) Austin Mack	1	15	15.0	15	0
(United States) Justin Rankin	1	15	15.0	15	0
(Canada) Skyler Griffith	1	6	6.0	6	0
Elks defence
Player	DT–ST	QS	Int	FR	FF
(Canada) Joel Dublanko	7–0	0	0	0	0
(United States) Kenny Logan Jr.	5–0	0	0	0	0
(United States) J. J. Ross	5–0	0	0	0	0
(United States) Chelen Garnes	4–0	0	0	0	0
(United States) Kordell Jackson	4–0	0	0	0	0
(United States) Nick Anderson	4–0	0	0	0	0
(Nigeria) Richard Jibunor	0–3	0	0	0	0
(United States) Noah Taylor	2–0	0	0	0	0
(American Samoa) Eteva Mauga-Clements	0–2	0	0	0	0
(Canada) Silas Hubert	0–2	0	0	0	0
(United States) Kobe Williams	1–0	0	0	0	0
(United States) Malik Carney	1–0	0	0	0	0
(United States) Tomari Fox	1–0	0	0	0	0
(Canada) Dariel Djabome	1–0	0	0	0	0
(United States) Jared Brinkman	1–0	0	0	0	0
(United States) Austin Mack	1–0	0	0	0	0
(Canada) Brendan O'Leary-Orange	1–0	0	0	0	0
(Canada) Justin Pace	0–1	0	0	0	0
Elks placekicking
Player	FM–FA	Lng	Avg	Sng	CM-CA
(Canada) Vincent Blanchard	3–3	48	43.3	0	4–4
Elks punting
Player	No	GAv	NAv	Sng	Lng
(Canada) Jake Julien	2	48.5	37.5	0	53
Elks punt returns
Player	PR	Yards	Avg	Lg	TD
(United States) ShunDerrick Powell	2	21	10.5	11	0
(United States) Joshua Cephus	1	9	9.0	9	0
(United States) Montrell Washington	1	1	1.0	1	0
Elks kickoff returns
Player	PR	Yards	Avg	Lg	TD
(United States) Montrell Washington	3	115	38.3	78	0
(United States) ShunDerrick Powell	1	22	22.0	22	0
(United States) Austin Mack	1	0	0.0	0	0

Alouettes passing
Player	CP/AT	Pct	Yards	TD	Int
(United States) Davis Alexander	21/36	58.3%	226	1	0
(United States) Caleb Evans	0/1	0.0%	0	0	0
Alouettes rushing
Player	Car	Yards	Avg	Lg	TD
(United States) Stevie Scott	13	133	10.2	31	0
(United States) Davis Alexander	4	29	7.3	17	1
(United States) Caleb Evans	2	2	1.0	1	1
Alouettes receiving
Player	Rec	Yards	Avg	Lg	TD
(Canada) Tyson Philpot	7	80	11.4	26	1
(United States) Tyler Snead	5	53	10.6	17	0
(United States) Cole Spieker	3	35	11.7	16	0
(United States) Jerreth Sterns	3	32	10.7	13	0
(United States) Charleston Rambo	3	26	8.7	12	0
Alouettes defence
Player	DT–ST	QS	Int	FR	FF
(Canada) Geoffrey Cantin-Arku	6–1	0	0	0	0
(United States) Tyrice Beverette	4–1	0	0	0	0
(United States) Kabion Ento	4–0	0	1	0	0
(United States) Daniel Wise	4–0	0	0	0	0
(United States) Robert Kennedy	4–0	0	0	0	0
(United States) Lorenzo Burns	4–0	0	0	0	0
(Canada) Nate Beauchemin	3–0	0	0	0	0
(United States) Julian Howsare	3–0	0	0	0	0
(United States) Najee Murray	3–0	0	0	0	0
(United States) Wesley Sutton	2–0	0	0	0	0
(United States) Micah Awe	1–3	0	0	0	0
(United States) Don Callis	1–0	0	0	0	1
(Canada) Isaac Adeyemi-Berglund	1–0	0	0	1	0
(United States) Dylan Wynn	1–0	0	0	0	0
(Canada) Lwal Uguak	1–0	0	0	0	0
(Canada) Bryce Ganious	1–0	0	0	0	0
(Canada) Alexandre Gagné	0–1	0	0	0	0
(Canada) Joshua Archibald	0–1	0	0	0	0
(Canada) Shakespeare Louis	0–1	0	0	0	0
Alouettes placekicking
Player	FM–FA	Lng	Avg	Sng	CM-CA
(Mexico) José Maltos Díaz	3–3	50	31.0	0	3–3
Alouettes punting
Player	No	GAv	NAv	Sng	Lng
(Australia) Joseph Zema	5	44.6	38.4	0	50
Alouettes punt returns
Player	PR	Yards	Avg	Lg	TD
(United States) Mekhi Mews	2	22	11.0	19	0
Alouettes kickoff returns
Player	PR	Yards	Avg	Lg	TD
(United States) Mekhi Mews	5	126	25.2	32	0
(Canada) Tyson Philpot	2	56	28.0	28	0

== Depth charts ==
The following diagrams illustrate the teams' depth charts that were released one day prior to game day. Starters are listed in boxes in their respective positions with backups listed directly above or below.

=== Edmonton Elks ===
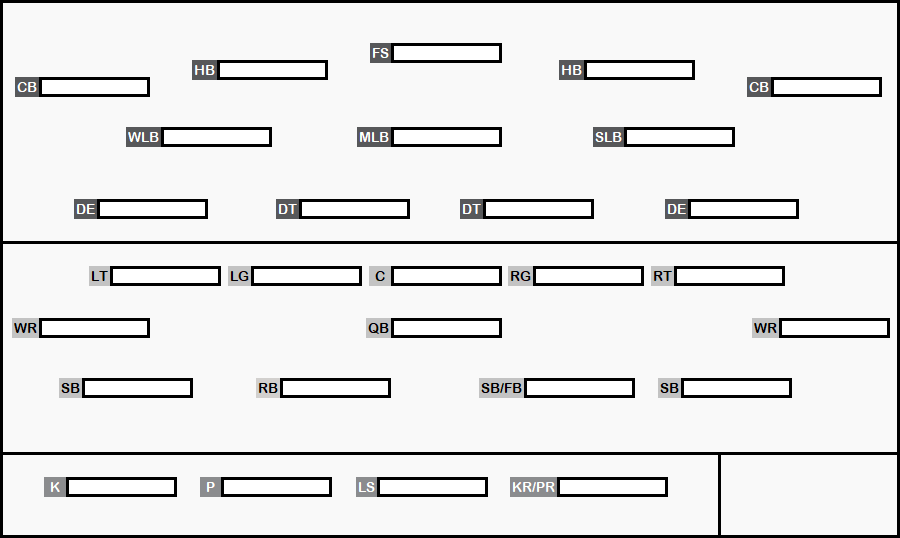

=== Montreal Alouettes ===
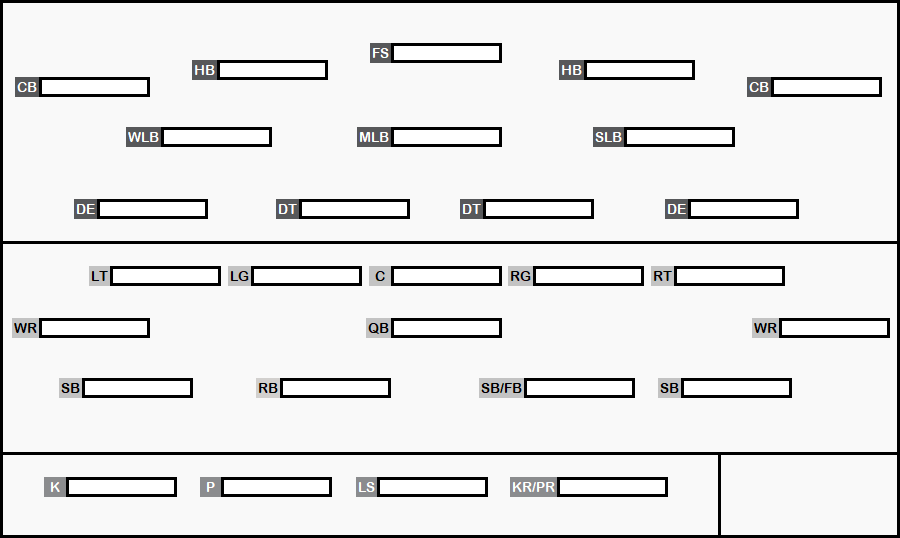

== Officials ==
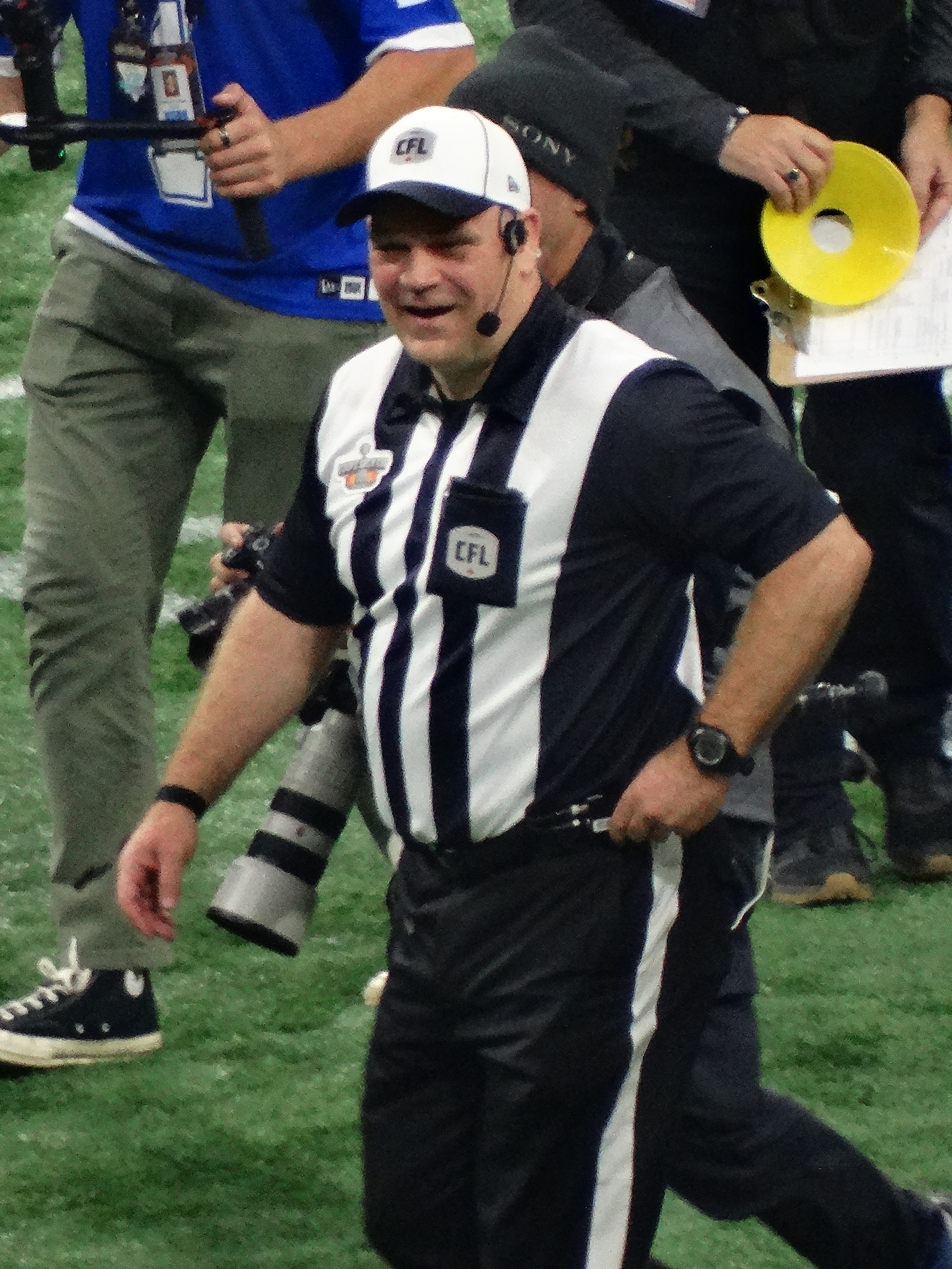
Ben Major was assigned to officiate his ninth Grey Cup.

The highest-rated officials during the 2026 CFL season from their respective positions were selected for the game and announced on November 12. The numbers below indicate their uniform numbers.

- Referee: No. 31 Ben Major
- Umpire: No. 58 Kyle Mikulik
- Down Judge: No. 27 Andrew Wakefield
- Line Judge: No. 83 Dan Mulvihill
- Side Judge: No. 18 Pierre Laporte
- Back Judge: No. 65 Iain Cropper
- Field Judge: No. 37 Jason Maggio
- Backup Referee: No. 74 Tim Kroeker
- Backup Official: No. 34 Ritchie Miller
- Backup Official: No. 81 Walt Hawrysh
- Backup Official: No. 93 Chris Donaldson
