= Ento =

Ento could refer to:

- Sandefjord Airport, Torp, a minor airport in Sandefjord, Norway
- Kabion Ento (born 1996), American football defensive back
- ENTO Aberaman Athletic F. C., former name of Welsh football club Aberdare Town F. C. from 2004 to 2009
