= Malik Carney =

American gridiron football player (born 1995)

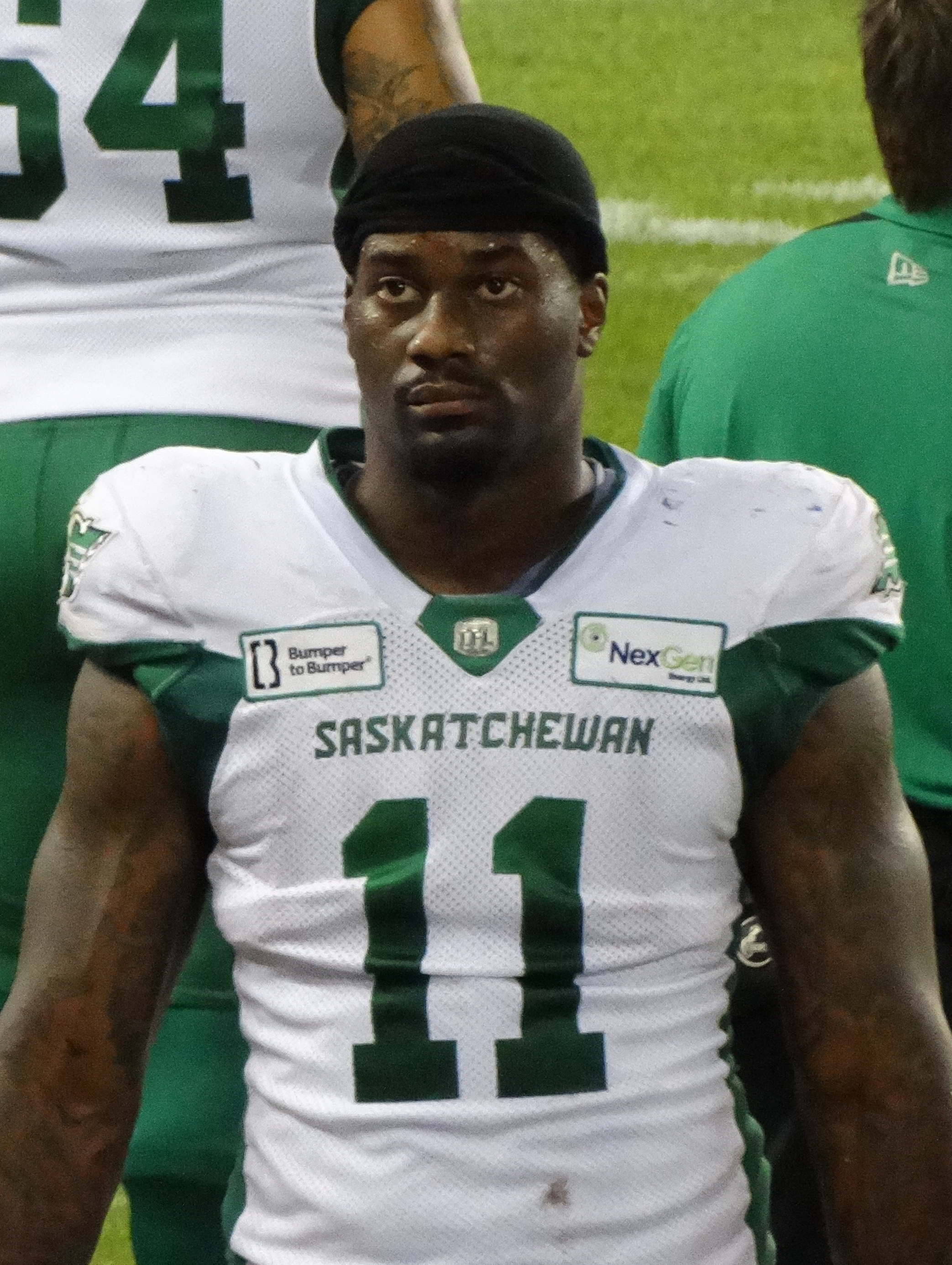
- Carney with the Saskatchewan Roughriders in 2024

No. 2 – Edmonton Elks
- Position: Defensive end
- Roster status: Active
- CFL status: American

Personal information
- Born: September 21, 1995 (age 31); Alexandria, Virginia, U.S.
- Listed height: 6 ft 3 in (1.91 m)
- Listed weight: 230 lb (104 kg)

Career information
- High school: T. C. Williams High
- College: North Carolina
- NFL draft: 2019: undrafted

Career history
- Detroit Lions (2019)*; Seattle Seahawks (2019)*; Denver Broncos (2019–2020)*; Hamilton Tiger-Cats (2021–2023); Saskatchewan Roughriders (2024–2025); Edmonton Elks (2026–present)
- * Offseason or practice squad member only

Awards and highlights
- 2× Grey Cup champion (2025, 2026); CFL West All-Star (2026)

Career CFL statistics as of 2026
- Games played: 89
- Total tackles: 184
- Sacks: 36
- Pass deflections: 9
- Interceptions: 1
- Forced fumbles: 8
- Stats at CFL.ca
- Stats at Pro Football Reference

Malik Carney (born September 21, 1995) is an American professional football defensive end for the Edmonton Elks of the Canadian Football League (CFL).

== College career ==
After using a redshirt season in 2014, Carney played college football for the North Carolina Tar Heels from 2015 to 2018. He played in 36 games where he had 176 tackles, 32.5 tackles for loss, 17 sacks, five forced fumbles and three fumble recoveries.

== Professional career ==
Pre-draft measurables
Height	Weight	Arm length	Hand span	Wingspan	40-yard dash	10-yard split	20-yard split	20-yard shuttle	Three-cone drill	Vertical jump	Broad jump	Bench press
6 ft 2 in (1.88 m)	251 lb (114 kg)	33 3/8 in (0.85 m)	9 7/8 in (0.25 m)	6 ft 6 3/4 in (2.00 m)	4.73 s	1.60 s	2.77 s	4.75 s	7.40 s	33.0 in (0.84 m)	9 ft 5 in (2.87 m)	25 reps
All values from NFL Combine/Pro Day

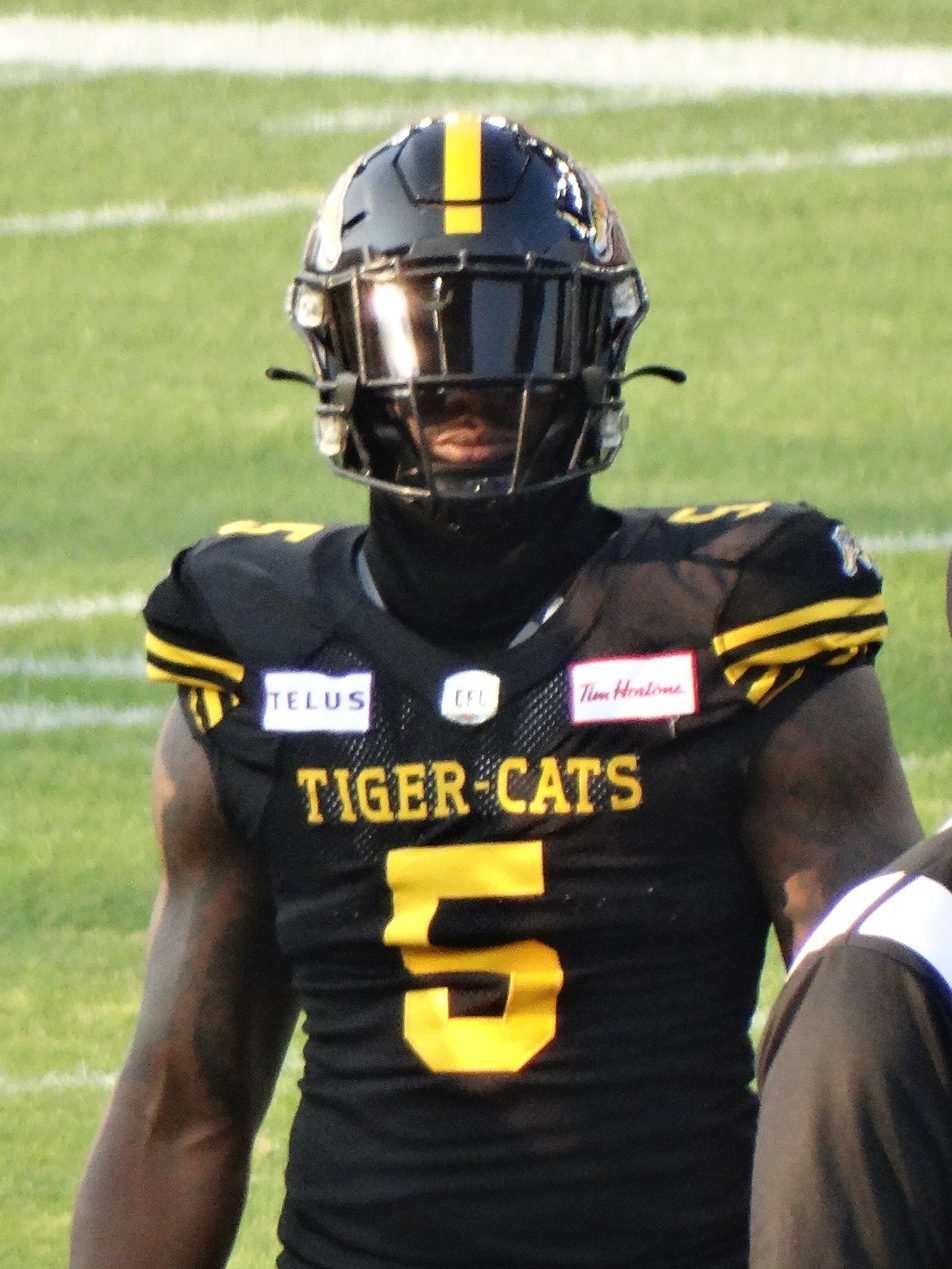
Carney with the Hamilton Tiger-Cats in 2023

=== Detroit Lions ===
On May 10, 2019, Carney signed with the Detroit Lions after going undrafted in the 2019 NFL draft. He was released near the end of training camp on August 31, 2019.

=== Seattle Seahawks ===
On September 25, 2019, Carney signed a practice roster agreement with the Seattle Seahawks. He was released October 15, 2019, but then re-signed on October 23, 2019. Two days later, he was again released from the practice squad.

=== Denver Broncos ===
On November 12, 2019, Carney signed a practice roster agreement with the Denver Broncos. He re-signed with the team to a futures contract on December 31, 2019, but was released at the end of the pre-season on September 5, 2020.

=== Hamilton Tiger-Cats ===
On January 18, 2021, Carney signed with the Hamilton Tiger-Cats. After beginning the season on the injured list, he made his professional debut in week 2, on August 14, 2021, against the Saskatchewan Roughriders where he also recorded his first sack after tackling Cody Fajardo. He played in four regular season games, starting in two, where he had three defensive tackles, one special teams tackle, and one sack. He was on the reserve roster for the East Semi-Final, but made his playoff debut in the East Final where he recorded two tackles and a sack in the victory over the Toronto Argonauts. In his first Grey Cup championship game, he recorded one defensive tackle in the 108th Grey Cup loss to the Winnipeg Blue Bombers.

Following 2022 training camp, Carney earned a starting role at defensive end for the season opening game against the Roughriders, where he had four defensive tackles, but was reduced to a backup role thereafter.

In February 2024, he was eligible to test free agency.

=== Saskatchewan Roughriders ===
On February 13, 2024, the Roughriders announced that Carney had signed with the team.

=== Edmonton Elks ===
The Edmonton Elks announced the signing of Carney on February 11, 2026.

== Personal life ==
Carney was born to parents Lamont Carney and Adrienne Williams.
