= Austin Mack =

American gridiron football player (born 1997)

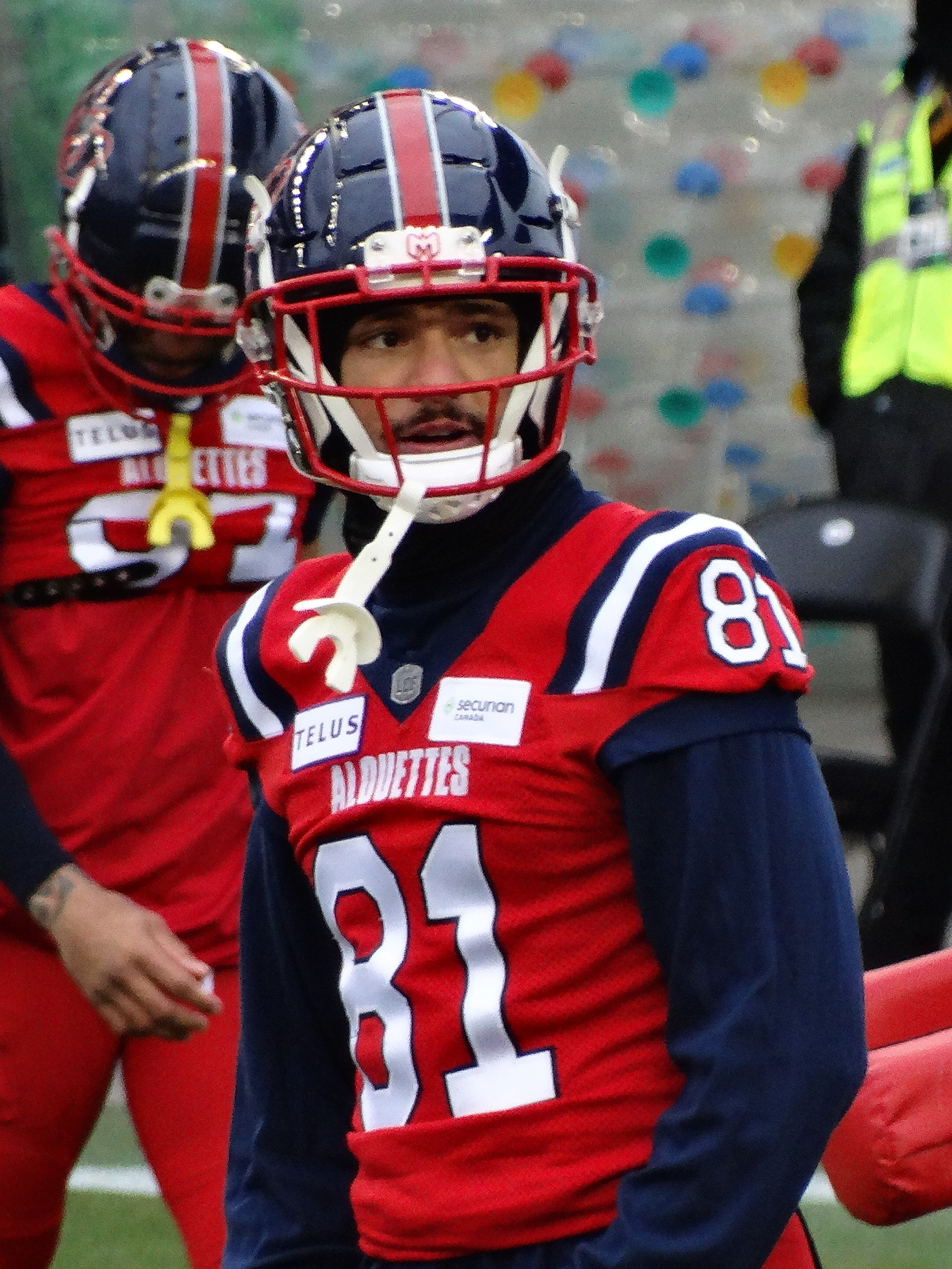
- Mack with the Montreal Alouettes in 2023

No. 3 – Edmonton Elks
- Position: Wide receiver
- Roster status: Active
- CFL status: American

Personal information
- Born: August 31, 1997 (age 29); Fort Wayne, Indiana, U.S.
- Listed height: 6 ft 1 in (1.85 m)
- Listed weight: 208 lb (94 kg)

Career information
- High school: Bishop Luers (Fort Wayne)
- College: Ohio State (2016–2019)
- NFL draft: 2020: undrafted

Career history
- New York Giants (2020); Tennessee Titans (2021)*; San Francisco 49ers (2021–2022)*; Montreal Alouettes (2023); Atlanta Falcons (2024)*; Montreal Alouettes (2024–2025); Edmonton Elks (2026–present)
- * Offseason or practice squad member only

Awards and highlights
- 2× Grey Cup champion (2023, 2026); CFL All-Star (2023); CFL East All-Star (2023); CFL West All-Star (2026)

Career NFL statistics
- Games played: 11
- Receptions: 7
- Receiving yards: 91
- Stats at Pro Football Reference

Career CFL statistics as of 2026
- Games played: 49
- Receptions: 218
- Receiving yards: 3,227
- Receiving touchdowns: 15
- Stats at CFL.ca

Austin Mack (born August 31, 1997) is an American professional football wide receiver for the Edmonton Elks of the Canadian Football League (CFL). He most previously played for the Montreal Alouettes of the Canadian Football League (CFL). He played college football for the Ohio State Buckeyes. He signed as an undrafted free agent with the New York Giants in 2020.

== Early life ==
Mack grew up in Fort Wayne, Indiana, and attended Bishop Luers High School. He had 69 receptions for 1,062 yards and 15 touchdowns and was the runner up to Indiana's Mr. Football award as a junior. In his senior season he caught 41 passes for 805 yards and six touchdowns and had to move to running back midway through the season due to injuries on the team and rushed for 718 yards. Rated a four-star recruit and the best collegiate prospect in Indiana by Rivals.com, Mack committed to play college football at Ohio State going into his senior year over offers from Notre Dame, Michigan, and Tennessee.

== College career ==
Mack was a member of the Ohio State Buckeyes for four seasons and joined the team as an early enrollee. Mack played mostly on special teams as a true freshman with two receptions for 15 yards on offense. As a sophomore, he caught 24 passes for 343 yards and two touchdowns. Mack scored his first collegiate touchdown on September 16, 2017, against Army. He had 26 receptions for 331 yards and one touchdown before suffering a season ending ankle injury eight games into his junior season. As a senior, Mack caught 27 passes for 361 yards and three touchdowns. He finished his collegiate career with 79 receptions, 1,050 yards and six touchdowns.

== Professional career ==
Pre-draft measurables
Height	Weight	Arm length	Hand span	Wingspan	40-yard dash	10-yard split	20-yard split	20-yard shuttle	Vertical jump	Broad jump
6 ft 1 1/2 in (1.87 m)	208 lb (94 kg)	33 5/8 in (0.85 m)	10 in (0.25 m)	6 ft 6 1/2 in (1.99 m)	4.59 s	1.57 s	2.65 s	4.42 s	31.5 in (0.80 m)	9 ft 9 in (2.97 m)
All values from NFL Combine

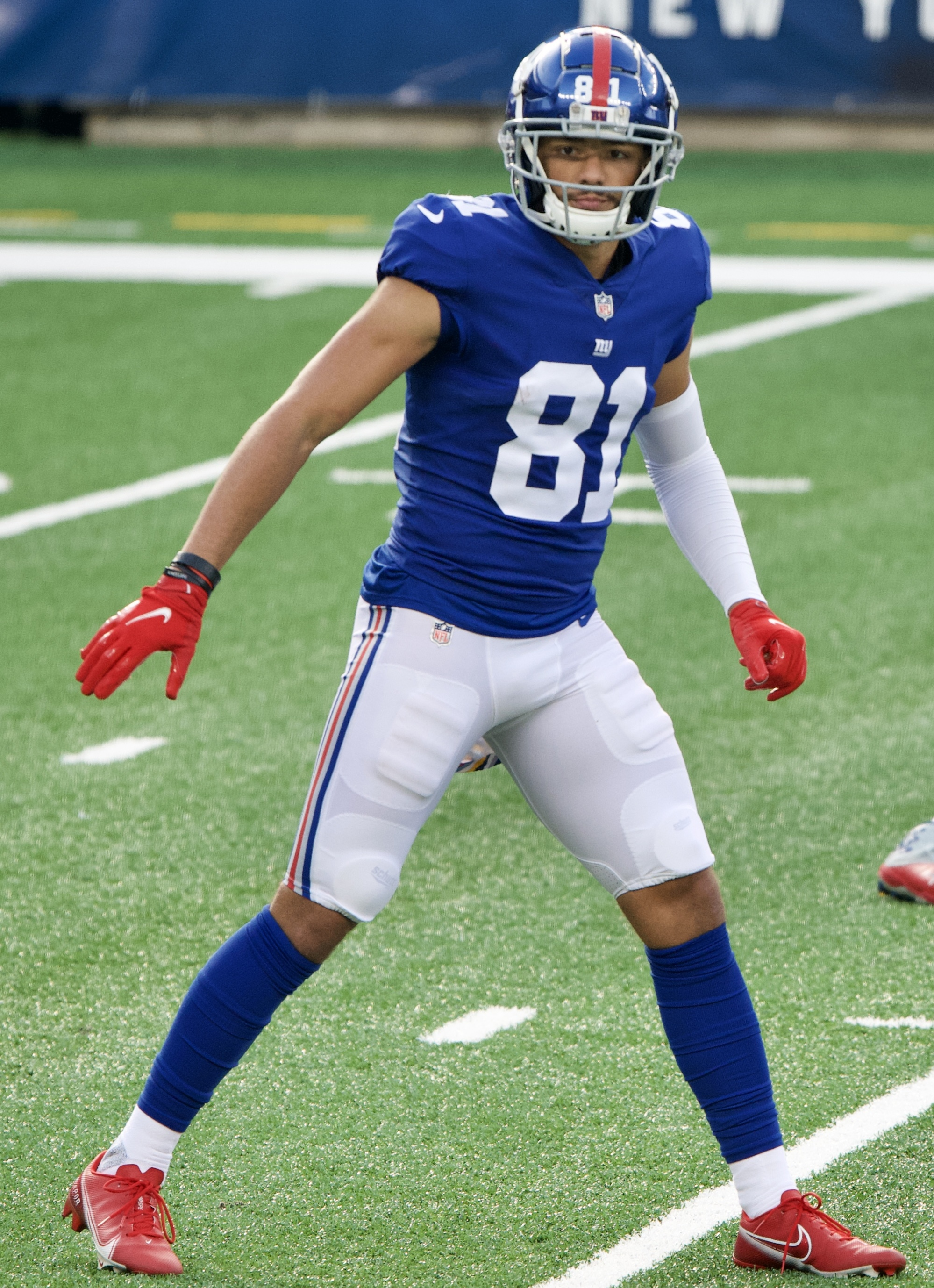
Mack at MetLife Stadium in 2020.

=== New York Giants ===
Mack signed with the New York Giants as an undrafted free agent on April 25, 2020, shortly after the conclusion of the 2020 NFL draft. He was waived on September 5, and was re-signed to the practice squad the following day. On October 3, Mack was elevated to the active roster, but he was listed inactive for the team's game the next day against the Los Angeles Rams and was subsequently reverted to the practice squad. Mack was signed to the active 53-man roster on October 13, and made his NFL debut on October 18, catching one pass for one yard in a 20–19 win over the Washington Football Team. On November 8, he caught four passes for 72 yards in a 23–20 win against Washington, including a 50-yard reception from Daniel Jones.

On August 31, 2021, Mack was placed on injured reserve. He was released on September 7.

=== Tennessee Titans ===
Mack signed with the Tennessee Titans' practice squad on November 23, 2021. He was released by the Titans on November 30.

=== San Francisco 49ers ===
On December 6, 2021, Mack was signed to the San Francisco 49ers' practice squad. He signed a reserve/future contract with the 49ers on February 2, 2022. Mack was waived/injured on August 22, and placed on injured reserve. He was released by San Francisco on August 27.

=== Montreal Alouettes (first stint) ===
On May 4, 2023, Mack signed with the Montreal Alouettes of the Canadian Football League (CFL). On June 23, against the Hamilton Tiger-Cats, he caught his first two touchdown passes and helped the Alouettes with a 38–12 win over the Tiger-Cats. In his first year in the CFL, Mack played in 17 regular season games where he had 78 receptions for 1,154 yards and four touchdowns. He finished fifth in the league in receiving yards and was named a CFL All-Star for his outstanding first season in the league. In the team's two playoff games, he had seven catches for 82 yards and one touchdown as the team qualified for the Grey Cup championship game. In the 110th Grey Cup, Mack led all receivers with six receptions for 103 yards and one touchdown as the Alouettes defeated the Winnipeg Blue Bombers 28–24.

=== Atlanta Falcons ===
On January 10, 2024, Mack signed a reserve/future contract with the Atlanta Falcons. He was waived by the Falcons on August 12.

=== Montreal Alouettes (second stint) ===
On August 19, 2024, it was announced that Mack had re-signed with the Alouettes to a four-year contract. In his first game back, he recorded three receptions for 32 yards, but suffered an ankle injury and was placed on the six-game injured list. He returned for the final two games of the regular season and had a total of ten catches for 145 yards in 2024.

In the 2025 season, Mack suffered ankle and hamstring injuries, causing him to miss six games. In 12 regular season games, he had 73 catches for 674 yards and two touchdowns. He also played in all three post-season games, including the 112th Grey Cup where he had no receptions and one defensive tackle in the team's 25–17 loss to the Saskatchewan Roughriders. He was released in the following off-season on January 26, 2026.

=== Edmonton Elks ===
Mack signed a two-year deal with the CFL's Edmonton Elks on January 29, 2026. The receiver would then go on to win the 113th Grey Cup with the Edmonton Elks.
