= Hoxie, Arkansas =

- City
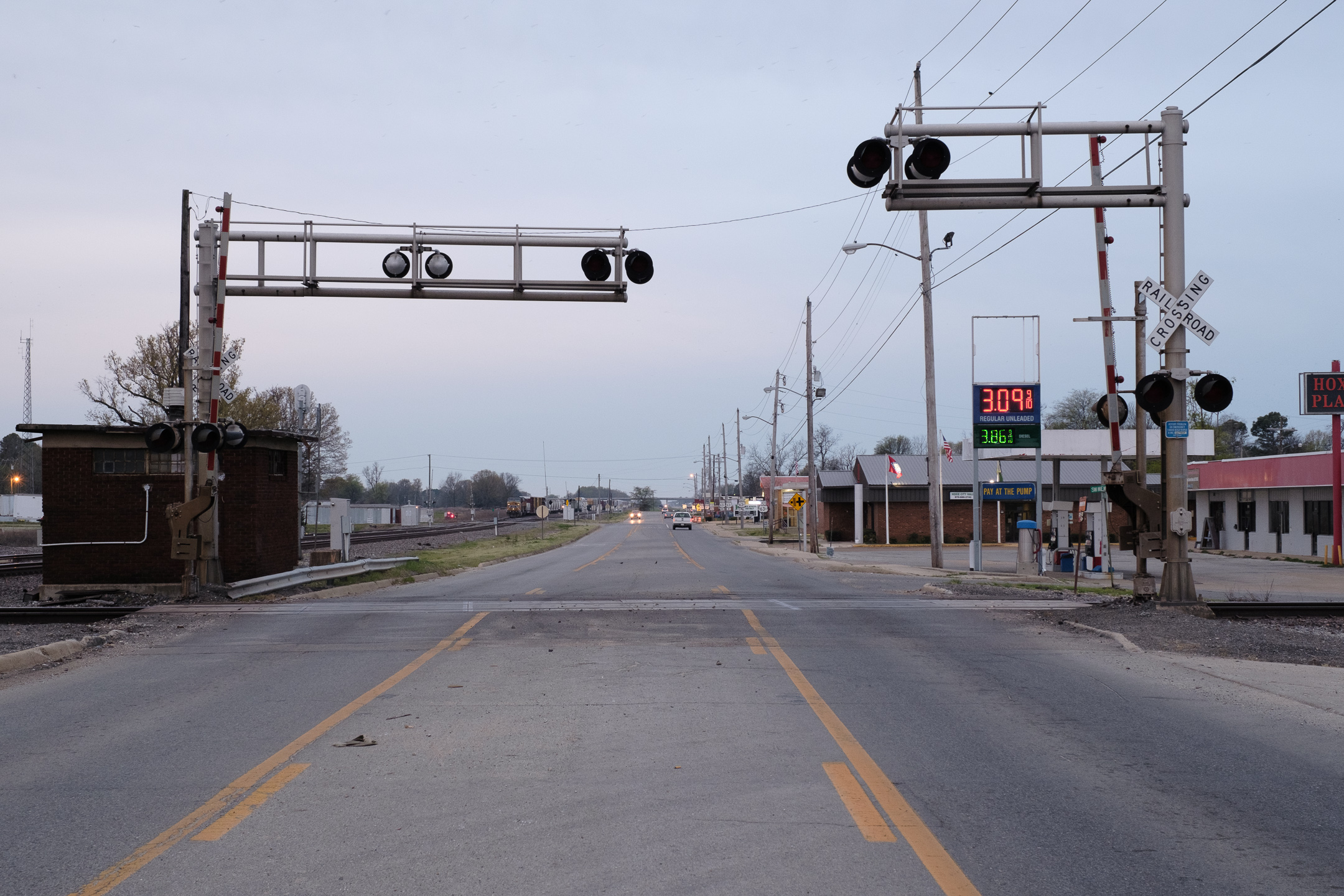
- Texas Street in Hoxie

- Location of Hoxie in Lawrence County, Arkansas.
- Coordinates: 36°2′55″N 90°58′38″W
- Country: United States
- State: Arkansas
- County: Lawrence

Government
  - Type: Municipal
  - Mayor: Steve Ditto

Area
  - Total: 6.66 sq mi (17.26 km^{2})
  - Land: 6.66 sq mi (17.26 km^{2})
  - Water: 0 sq mi (0.00 km^{2})
- Elevation: 266 ft (81 m)

Population (2020)
  - Total: 2,598
  - Estimate (2025): 2,568 ▼
  - Density: 389.7/sq mi (150.48/km^{2})
- Time zone: UTC-6 (Central (CST))
  - Summer (DST): UTC-5 (CDT)
- ZIP code: 72433
- Area code: 870
- FIPS code: 05-33580
- GNIS feature ID: 0057952
- Website: www.hereinhoxie.com

Hoxie (HAAK-see) is a city in Lawrence County, Arkansas, United States. It lies immediately south of Walnut Ridge. As of the 2020 census, Hoxie had a population of 2,598.

== History ==
=== The third Arkansas school to integrate ===
Prior to 1955, Hoxie maintained a dual system of education for younger students, one for white students and another one for black students. Rather than maintain two high schools, white high school students were educated locally, while black high school students were bused to a black school in Jonesboro. The negro school for grades 1-8 had only one teacher. On June 25, 1955, in response to the recent Brown v. Board of Education ruling, Hoxie's superintendent, Kunkel Edward Vance, spearheaded plans to integrate the schools, and he received the unanimous support of Hoxie's school board. On July 11, 1955, Hoxie schools recommenced and allowed African American students to attend. In order to do "what was morally right in the sight of God" and to "uphold the law of the land", Vance insisted that all facilities, including restrooms and cafeterias, be integrated.

Although there were many nervous parents, the schools opening on July 11 went smoothly. The teachers and children got along fine, but unlike the two other school districts in Arkansas (Charleston and Fayetteville) that implemented partial integration, Hoxie attracted national attention. A team of photographers from Life Magazine was on hand to document the event. After the publication of the Life article, segregationists from outside the area converged on Hoxie in an unsuccessful attempt to reverse the school board decision. Handbills were printed making wild assertions including allegations of a plot between negroes, Communists, and Jews, and advocating for the death of "Race Mixers". A group of local citizens, led by soybean farmer Herbert Brewer, confronted the school board in an unproductive meeting. After the meeting, Brewer organized a White Citizen's Council, which called for students, both black and white to boycott the schools. Approximately one third of the white students refused to attend the schools beginning on August 4, 1955.

A lawyer, Amis Guthridge, the leader of White America, inc., attempted to draw more outside influence into the fray, inflaming passions with statements such as calling school integration a "plan that was founded in Moscow in 1924 to mongrelize the white race in America" and claimed that "white Methodist women" wanted integration so they could get negro men into their bedroom. Johnson, Guthridge and others fanned the flames, and were joined by Orval Faubus in trying to invoke fears of miscegenation in white husbands and parents. In one rally, a speaker shouted "they do not want equality, you know they don't want equality"..."They want what you've got, they want your women!"

The Hoxie School Board filed suit against the segregationist leaders from Hoxie and elsewhere in the state and charged them with trespassing on school property, threatening picket lines, organizing boycotts, and intimidating school officials. In November 1955, United States District Judge for the Eastern District of Arkansas Thomas C. Trimble ruled that pro-segregationists had "planned and conspired" to prevent integration in Hoxie. In December 1955, he issued a permanent injunction and restraining order against the segregationists. Their appeal in the Eighth Circuit Court of Appeals was opposed by United States Attorney General Herbert Brownell and the U.S. Department of Justice. This marked the first intervention by the attorney general in support of any school district attempting to comply with the Brown decision. On October 25, 1956, the court ruled in favor of the Hoxie School Board.

U.S. Attorney Osro Cobb recalls that the situation at Hoxie

had reached the point of possible bloodshed. Guns were being carried; threats were being made, and violence could have erupted at any moment. Notwithstanding, a conference exploring the situation and its possible effects on the community with the individuals at the core of the problem had worked a minor miracle. It demonstrated that while passions and prejudice in race relations often hurl reason aside, reason can be restored at the conference table where there is dedication by the parties to the public interest. That is the lesson to be learned from Hoxie.

In 2003, David Appleby produced a documentary entitled Hoxie - The First Stand detailing the events of school integration in Hoxie. The film later received the Peabody Award and the Du Pont Award for Broadcast Journalism.

=== Train crash ===
On August 17, 2014, at 2:30 AM, two Union Pacific freight trains collided in Hoxie, killing two people and causing the evacuation of about 500 people within a 1.5 square mile radius. U.S. 67 was closed for approximately one week for cleanup and repair.

== Geography ==
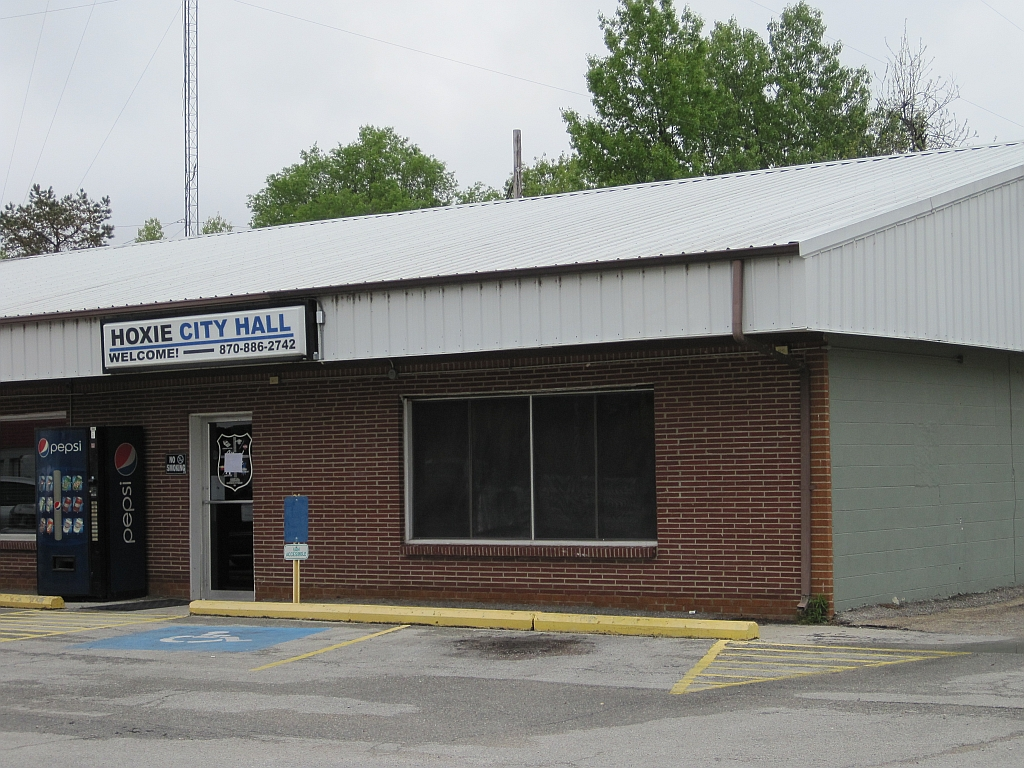
Hoxie City Hall

Hoxie is located at 36°2′55″N 90°58′38″W (36.048616, -90.977296).

According to the United States Census Bureau, the city has a total area of 4.0 square miles (10 km^{2}), all land.

=== List of highways ===
- U.S. 63
- U.S. 67
- U.S. 63 Business
- Highway 367

U.S. Highways 63 and 67 intersect and cross each other in Hoxie. U.S. 63 enters Arkansas at the Missouri line at Thayer, Missouri, and Mammoth Spring, Arkansas, two contiguous cities. U.S. 63 then goes southeastward to connect with Interstate 55 near Turrell, in Crittenden County. It runs contiguous with I-55 and I-40 for a ways. Both those interstates cross the Mississippi River into Memphis, Tennessee. U.S. 63 is then contiguous with a number of other routes southward in Arkansas, leaving Arkansas for Louisiana at Junction City, in Union County. U.S. 67 is a southwest—northeast bisector of Arkansas.

Two railroads, the Burlington Northern-Santa Fe and the Union Pacific, have mainline tracks that cross each other at Hoxie—the BNSF in a generally northwest-southeast direction, and the UP in a generally north and south direction. This same situation also occurs in Jonesboro, in Craighead County.

== Demographics ==
Historical population
Census	Pop.	Note	%±
1890	102		—
1900	125		22.5%
1910	915		632.0%
1920	1,711		87.0%
1930	1,448		−15.4%
1940	1,466		1.2%
1950	1,855		26.5%
1960	1,886		1.7%
1970	2,265		20.1%
1980	2,961		30.7%
1990	2,676		−9.6%
2000	2,817		5.3%
2010	2,780		−1.3%
2020	2,598		−6.5%
2025 (est.)	2,568	▼	−1.2%
U.S. Decennial Census

=== 2020 census ===
As of the 2020 census, Hoxie had a population of 2,598. The median age was 37.8 years. 24.6% of residents were under the age of 18 and 16.9% were 65 years of age or older. For every 100 females, there were 97.0 males, and for every 100 females age 18 and over there were 93.7 males.

88.6% of residents lived in urban areas, while 11.4% lived in rural areas.

There were 1,066 households, of which 32.1% had children under the age of 18 living in them. Of all households, 42.5% were married-couple households, 18.6% had a male householder and no spouse or partner present, and 31.4% had a female householder and no spouse or partner present. About 31.2% of all households were made up of individuals, and 13.4% had someone living alone who was 65 years of age or older.

There were 1,187 housing units, of which 10.2% were vacant. The homeowner vacancy rate was 1.5% and the rental vacancy rate was 6.7%.

Hoxie racial composition
Race	Number	Percentage
White (non-Hispanic)	2,407	92.65%
Black or African American (non-Hispanic)	14	0.54%
Native American	10	0.38%
Asian	3	0.12%
Pacific Islander	1	0.04%
Other/Mixed	138	5.31%
Hispanic or Latino	25	0.96%

=== 2010 census ===
As of the census of 2010, there were 2,780 people, 1,108 households, and 797 families residing in the city. The population density was 707.5 inhabitants per square mile (273.2/km^{2}). There were 1,241 housing units at an average density of 311.7 per square mile (120.3/km^{2}). The racial makeup of the city was 98.15% White, 0.46% Black or African American, 0.39% Native American, 0.07% Pacific Islander, 0.28% from other races, and 0.64% from two or more races. 1.49% of the population were Hispanic or Latino of any race.

There were 1,108 households, out of which 36.0% had children under the age of 18 living with them, 53.6% were married couples living together, 14.9% had a female householder with no husband present, and 28.0% were non-families. 24.7% of all households were made up of individuals, and 12.2% had someone living alone who was 65 years of age or older. The average household size was 2.54 and the average family size was 3.03.

In the city, the population was spread out, with 27.9% under the age of 18, 9.4% from 18 to 24, 28.1% from 25 to 44, 21.8% from 45 to 64, and 12.9% who were 65 years of age or older. The median age was 34 years. For every 100 females, there were 91.9 males. For every 100 females age 18 and over, there were 86.8 males.

The median income for a household in the city was $24,726, and the median income for a family was $30,085. Males had a median income of $26,583 versus $18,418 for females. The per capita income for the city was $12,190. About 20.7% of families and 24.2% of the population were below the poverty line, including 31.3% of those under age 18 and 28.0% of those age 65 or over.

== Education ==
Public education for elementary and secondary school students is provided by the Hoxie School District, which leads to graduation from Hoxie High School. The school mascot and athletic emblem is the Mustang with green and white serving as the school colors.

== Notable people ==
- ShunDerrick Powell, professional football player
- Billy Taylor, All-American football player
- Miller Williams, poet
- Raven Gates Gottschalk, reality show contestant
