= Terez Reid =

American gridiron football player (born 2003)

No. 41 – Edmonton Elks
- Position: Defensive back
- Roster status: Active
- CFL status: American

Personal information
- Born: April 1, 2003 (age 23); Indianapolis, Indiana, U.S.
- Listed height: 5 ft 10 in (1.78 m)
- Listed weight: 187 lb (85 kg)

Career information
- High school: Warren Central (Indianapolis)
- College: Grand Valley State (2021–2024); UTEP (2025); Florida Atlantic (2025)
- NFL draft: 2026: undrafted

Career history
- Edmonton Elks (2026–present)

Awards and highlights
- Grey Cup champion (2026); 2× Second-Team All-GLIAC (2022–2023)
- Stats at CFL.ca

Terez Reid (born April 1, 2003) is an American professional football defensive back for the Edmonton Elks of the Canadian Football League (CFL). He played college football for the Grand Valley State Lakers, UTEP Miners and Florida Atlantic Owls.

== College career ==
Reid played college football for the Grand Valley State Lakers from 2021 to 2024 and the UTEP Miners and Florida Atlantic Owls in 2025. At Grand Valley, he played in 39 games, starting 37, where he 95 tackles, four interceptions, 22 pass deflections and one fumble recovery. Reid was named to the second-team All-GLIAC team in 2022 2023 and 2024.

In 2025, Reid transferred to UTEP. He participated in spring camp before he entered the transfer portal again. Reid committed to Florida Atlantic University. At FAU, he appeared in 12 games and made 42 tackles, including four for loss, one interception and eight pass breakups.

== Professional career ==
Pre-draft measurables
Height	Weight	Arm length	Hand span	Wingspan	40-yard dash	10-yard split	20-yard split	20-yard shuttle	Three-cone drill	Vertical jump	Broad jump	Bench press
5 ft 10 in (1.78 m)	181 lb (82 kg)	30 3/4 in (0.78 m)	9 1/8 in (0.23 m)	6 ft 2 3/8 in (1.89 m)	4.63 s	1.56 s	2.62 s	4.28 s	7.02 s	32 1/2 in (0.83 m)	10 ft 1 in (3.07 m)	10 reps
All values from Pro day

On May 8, 2026, Reid signed with the Edmonton Elks of the Canadian Football League (CFL). On May 31, he was signed to the practice roster. On August 13, Reid was promoted to the active roster and made his debut at boundary halfback on August 15 against the Toronto Argonauts.
