= ShunDerrick Powell =

American football player (born 2002)

No. 24 – Edmonton Elks
- Position: Running back
- Roster status: Active
- CFL status: American

Personal information
- Born: May 16, 2002 (age 24); Hoxie, Arkansas, U.S.
- Listed height: 5 ft 10 in (1.78 m)
- Listed weight: 180 lb (82 kg)

Career information
- High school: Hoxie (AR)
- College: North Alabama (2021–2022); Central Arkansas (2023–2024)
- NFL draft: 2025: undrafted

Career history
- Philadelphia Eagles (2025)*; Kansas City Chiefs (2026)*; Edmonton Elks (2026–present)
- * Offseason or practice squad member only

Awards and highlights
- Grey Cup champion (2026); First-team FCS All-American (2024)
- Stats at CFL.ca

ShunDerrick Bre'sean Powell (born May 16, 2002) is an American professional football running back for the Edmonton Elks of the Canadian Football League (CFL). He played college football for the North Alabama Lions and Central Arkansas Bears. He was signed by the Philadelphia Eagles as an undrafted free agent in 2025 and was briefly a member of the Kansas City Chiefs in 2026.

== Early life ==
Powell is from Hoxie, Arkansas. He attended Hoxie High School where he played football as a running back. He set a school record with 350 rushing yards in a game and helped them compile a record of 22–4 in his last two years with two state playoff appearances and one appearance in the state seminfinals. He was named an all-state and all-conference selection and committed to play college football for the North Alabama Lions.

== College career ==
As a freshman at North Alabama in 2021, Powell appeared in 11 games and ran 30 times for 154 yards, averaging 5.1 yards per carry. He then ran for 1,508 yards and 18 touchdowns as a sophomore, being selected second-team FCS All-American as well as the co-Atlantic Sun Conference Offensive Player of the Year. He ran for over 200 yards in four games and his rushing yards total placed fourth nationally, while he also finished third in touchdowns and fifth in all-purpose yards (160.1 yards per game). His performances included a North Alabama-record 251 rushing yards and four touchdowns against the UVA Wise Cavaliers. He transferred to the Central Arkansas Bears in 2023.

With the Bears in 2023, Powell ran for 1,009 yards and six touchdowns, averaging 7.3 yards per carry. As a senior in 2024, he ran for 1,343 yards and 14 touchdowns, finishing seventh nationally in rushing yards. He averaged 8.2 yards per carry and was named an FCS All-American. He finished his collegiate career with over 4,000 yards and 42 touchdowns and was invited to the Hula Bowl.

== Professional career ==
Pre-draft measurables
Height	Weight	Arm length	Hand span	Wingspan	40-yard dash	10-yard split	20-yard split	20-yard shuttle	Three-cone drill	Vertical jump	Broad jump	Bench press
5 ft 7 1/8 in (1.70 m)	183 lb (83 kg)	30 in (0.76 m)	8 3/4 in (0.22 m)	6 ft 0 1/2 in (1.84 m)	4.40 s	1.50 s	2.52 s	4.40 s	7.39 s	40.5 in (1.03 m)	10 ft 9 in (3.28 m)	21 reps
All values from Pro Day

=== Philadelphia Eagles ===
After going unselected in the 2025 NFL draft, Powell signed with the Philadelphia Eagles as an undrafted free agent. He was waived on August 26 as part of final roster cuts.

=== Kansas City Chiefs ===
On January 6, 2026, Powell signed a reserve/future contract with the Kansas City Chiefs. On April 29, Powell was waived by the Chiefs.

=== Edmonton Elks ===
On May 8, 2026, Powell signed with the Edmonton Elks.

== Personal life ==
Powell has a son, ShunDerrick Jr.
