= Montrell Washington =

American football player (born 1999)

No. 82 – Edmonton Elks
- Positions: Wide receiver, return specialist
- Roster status: Active
- CFL status: American

Personal information
- Born: March 14, 1999 (age 27); Canton, Georgia, U.S.
- Listed height: 5 ft 10 in (1.78 m)
- Listed weight: 170 lb (77 kg)

Career information
- High school: Cherokee (Canton)
- College: Samford (2017–2021)
- NFL draft: 2022: 5th round, 162nd overall pick

Career history
- Denver Broncos (2022); Kansas City Chiefs (2023–2024); New York Giants (2025)*; DC Defenders (2026)*; Houston Texans (2026)*; Edmonton Elks (2026–present)
- * Offseason or practice squad member only

Awards and highlights
- Super Bowl champion (LVIII); Grey Cup champion (2026); First-team FCS All-American (2019) (Note: Selected as return specialist); First-team All-SoCon (2021); Second-team All-SoCon (2019); Second-team All-SoCon (2021) (Note: Selected as wide receiver)

Career NFL statistics
- Receptions: 4
- Receiving yards: 2
- Rushing yards: 30
- Return yards: 706
- Stats at Pro Football Reference

Montrell Washington (born March 14, 1999) is an American professional football wide receiver for the Edmonton Elks of the Canadian Football League (CFL). He played college football for the Samford Bulldogs.

== Professional career ==
Pre-draft measurables
Height	Weight	Arm length	Hand span	Wingspan	40-yard dash	10-yard split	20-yard split	20-yard shuttle	Three-cone drill	Vertical jump	Broad jump	Bench press
5 ft 8 7/8 in (1.75 m)	176 lb (80 kg)	28 3/8 in (0.72 m)	9 3/8 in (0.24 m)	5 ft 10 in (1.78 m)	4.48 s	1.60 s	2.48 s	4.32 s	7.25 s	36.0 in (0.91 m)	10 ft 4 in (3.15 m)	6 reps
All values from Pro Day

=== Denver Broncos ===
Washington was selected by the Denver Broncos in the fifth round, 162nd overall, of the 2022 NFL draft. As a rookie, he appeared in 15 games and started one. He contributed with kick and punt return duties on special teams.

On August 29, 2023, Washington was waived by the Broncos.

=== Kansas City Chiefs ===
On August 31, 2023, Washington was signed to the practice squad of the Kansas City Chiefs. He was promoted to the active roster on September 27. He was waived on October 19. Washington was a part of the Chiefs Super Bowl LVIII winning team when they beat the San Francisco 49ers. On February 14, Washington signed a reserve/futures contract with Kansas City.

Washington was waived by the Chiefs on August 27, 2024, and re-signed to the practice squad. He was released on December 30 and re-signed to the practice squad eight days later.

=== New York Giants ===
On February 14, 2025, Washington signed with the New York Giants. On August 22, Washington was released by the Giants.

=== DC Defenders ===
On January 14, 2026, Washington was selected by the DC Defenders of the United Football League (UFL). He was released on March 19.

=== Houston Texans ===
On August 5, 2026, Washington signed with the Houston Texans. He was released by the Texans on August 12.

=== Edmonton Elks ===
On September 3, 2026, Washington signed with the Edmonton Elks of the Canadian Football League (CFL).
