= Darnell Sankey =

American gridiron football player (born 1994)

- Sankey with the BC Lions in 2026

No. 53 – BC Lions
- Position: Linebacker
- Roster status: Active
- CFL status: American

Personal information
- Born: October 11, 1994 (age 32); San Jose, California, U.S.
- Listed height: 6 ft 0 in (1.83 m)
- Listed weight: 242 lb (110 kg)

Career information
- High school: Branham (San Jose)
- College: Sacramento State
- NFL draft: 2016: undrafted

Career history
- Denver Broncos (2016)*; Oakland Raiders (2016)*; Kansas City Chiefs (2016)*; Minnesota Vikings (2017)*; Indianapolis Colts (2017, 2018*); Baltimore Ravens (2017)*; Detroit Lions (2018)*; New Orleans Saints (2018–2019)*; Calgary Stampeders (2020–2022); Saskatchewan Roughriders (2022); Arlington Renegades (2023); Montreal Alouettes (2023–2025); BC Lions (2026–present)
- * Offseason or practice squad member only

Awards and highlights
- Grey Cup champion (2023); XFL champion (2023); CFL's Most Outstanding Defensive Player Award (2026); 2x CFL West All-Star (2021, 2026); 2× CFL East All-Star (2024, 2025)

Career NFL statistics
- Games played: 6
- Stats at Pro Football Reference

Career CFL statistics as of 2026
- Games played: 92
- Def. tackles: 575
- Sacks: 11
- Interceptions: 4
- Forced fumbles: 9
- Stats at CFL.ca

Darnell Sankey (born October 11, 1994) is an American professional football linebacker for the BC Lions of the Canadian Football League (CFL). He is a Grey Cup champion after winning with the Montreal Alouettes in 2023 and is a three-time divisional All-Star. He is also an XFL champion after winning with the Arlington Renegades earlier in 2023. He played college football at Sacramento State.

== Professional career ==
Pre-draft measurables
Height	Weight	Arm length	Hand span	Wingspan
6 ft 0 1/2 in (1.84 m)	246 lb (112 kg)	32 7/8 in (0.84 m)	9 in (0.23 m)	6 ft 5 1/2 in (1.97 m)
All values from Pro Day

=== Denver Broncos ===
On July 26, 2016, Sankey was signed to the Denver Broncos as an undrafted free agent. He was waived on August 29, 2016, and was ultimately released by the team.

=== Oakland Raiders ===
On September 28, 2016, Sankey was signed to the Oakland Raiders' practice squad. On October 4, he was waived, then re-signed the next day, only to be released a week later, on October 12, 2016.

=== Kansas City Chiefs ===
On December 5, 2016, Sankey was signed to the Kansas City Chiefs' practice squad. He was released on January 3, 2017.

=== Minnesota Vikings ===
On July 29, 2017, Sankey was signed by the Minnesota Vikings. He was waived on August 20, 2017, and was ultimately released by the team.

=== Indianapolis Colts (first stint) ===
Three days after he was cut by the Vikings, Sankey was signed by the Indianapolis Colts on August 23, 2017. He was waived on September 2, 2017, and was signed to the Colts' practice squad the next day. He was promoted to the active roster on September 16, 2017. He was waived on September 18, 2017. He was re-signed to the practice squad on September 29. He was promoted back to the active roster on October 9, 2017. He was waived again on November 15, 2017, and was ultimately released by the team.

=== Baltimore Ravens ===
On November 29, 2017, Sankey was signed to the Baltimore Ravens' practice squad.

=== Indianapolis Colts (second stint) ===
On January 11, 2018, Sankey left the Ravens to rejoin the Colts on a reserve/future contract. He was waived by the team on May 1, 2018, and was ultimately released.

=== Detroit Lions ===
On July 26, 2018, Sankey signed with the Detroit Lions. He was waived on September 1, 2018, and was signed to the practice squad the next day. He was released on September 5, 2018.

=== New Orleans Saints ===
On September 19, 2018, Sankey was signed to the New Orleans Saints' practice squad.

Sankey signed a reserve/future contract with the Saints on January 21, 2019. He was waived and released during final roster cuts on August 30, 2019.

=== Calgary Stampeders ===
Sankey signed with the Calgary Stampeders on February 10, 2020. After the CFL canceled the 2020 season due to the COVID-19 pandemic, Sankey chose to opt-out of his contract with the Stampeders on August 31, 2020. He opted back in to his contract on January 12, 2021.

=== Saskatchewan Roughriders ===
Sankey signed with the Saskatchewan Roughriders on February 8, 2022, at the expiry of his contract with the Stampeders.

=== Arlington Renegades ===
At the conclusion of his contract with the Roughriders, Sankey signed with the Arlington Renegades of the XFL in February of 2023. He won the 2023 XFL Championship on May 13, 2023. He was granted his release on August 3, 2023.

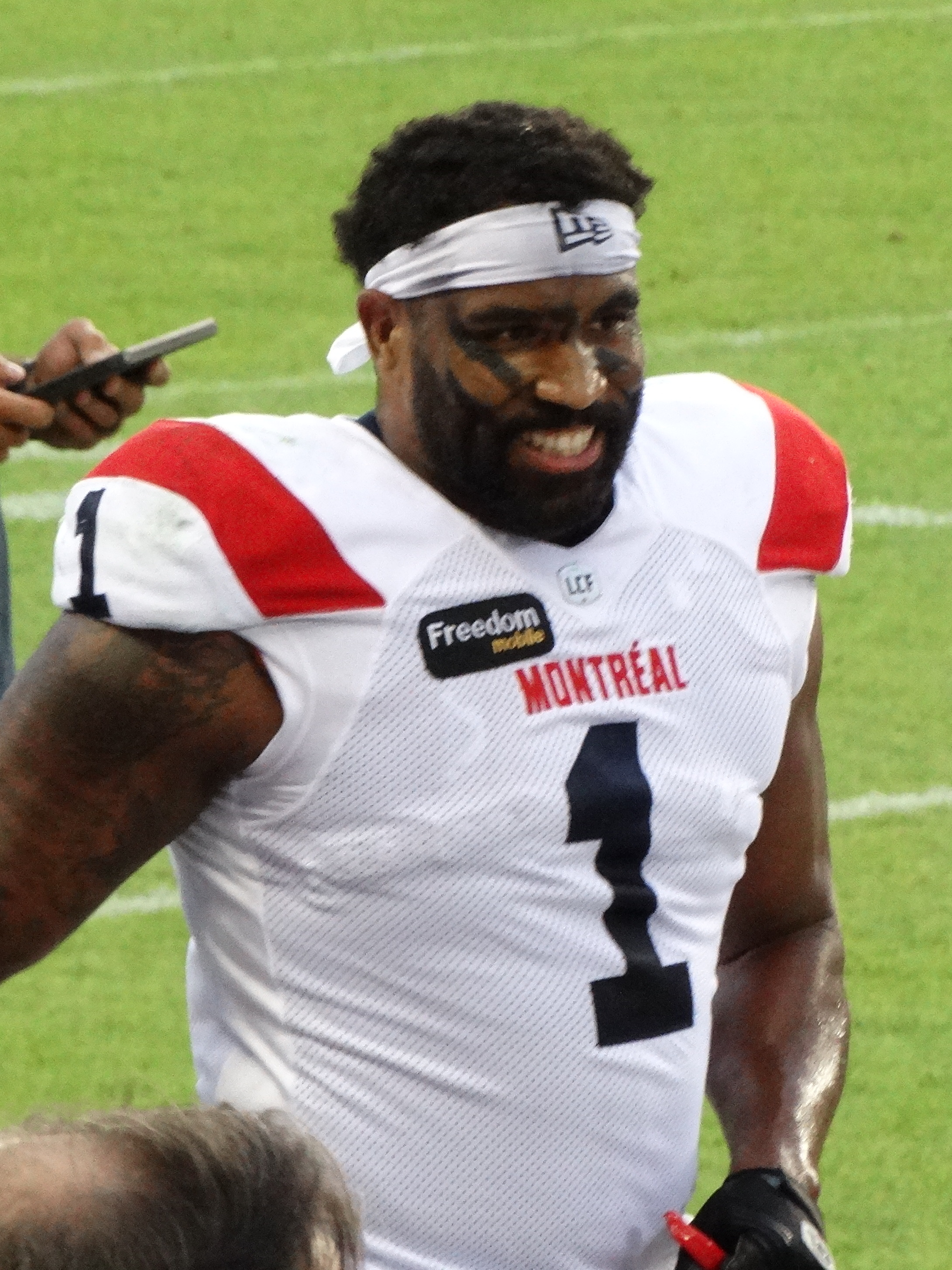
Sankey with the Montreal Alouettes in 2024

=== Montreal Alouettes ===
On September 11, 2023, it was announced that Sankey had signed with the Montreal Alouettes. In 2023, he played in six regular season games, starting in five, where he had 31 defensive tackles, one sack, one interception, one forced fumble, and one fumble recovery. In the 110th Grey Cup, Sankey had eight defensive tackles and one sack as the Alouettes defeated the Winnipeg Blue Bombers 28–24.

In the 2024 season, Sankey played in all 18 regular season games where he had 107 defensive tackles, one sack, four pass knockdowns, one interception, three forced fumbles, and two fumble recoveries. In the East Final, he had four defensive tackles, one pass knockdown, and one interception in the loss to the Toronto Argonauts. In 2025, Sankey played in 18 regular season games where he recorded 101 defensive tackles, two sacks, five pass knockdowns, and one fumble recovery. He was named a CFL East All-Star in both 2024 and 2025. As a pending free agent, he was granted an early release on December 11, 2025.

=== BC Lions ===
On December 19, 2025, the BC Lions announced that Sankey had signed with the team on a one-year contract. Sankey was named the 2026 CFL's Most Outstanding Defensive Player after finishing the season with 114 defensive tackles, and a third consecutive season of 100+ tackles, along with three sacks, 12 pass knockdowns, one forced fumble, one fumble recovery, and one interception. On November 17, 2026, Sankey signed a two-year extension with the Lions.
