= White America, Inc. =

Segregationist and white supremacist educational organization

- Successor: Arkansas chapter of White Citizen's Council
- Formation: February 1955; 71 years ago Pine Bluff, Arkansas, U.S.
- Dissolved: March 1956
- Type: Hate group/Pro-segregation
- Purpose: Maintaining segregation and white supremacy in the state of Arkansas.
- Headquarters: Pine Bluff, Arkansas, U.S.
- President: L.D. Poynter
- Executive Secretary: Amis Gutheridge
- Spokesperson: Amis Gutheridge
- Affiliations: White Citizen's Council

White America, Inc., was an organization founded in Pine Bluff, Arkansas, in February 1955. The organization was created following the desegregation of schools in Arkansas, to attempt to prevent "any attempts by Negroes to enter white schools" in the state. The group joined two other militant white supremacist organizations in September 1955 to attempt to intimidate the local school board of Hoxie to reverse its decision to integrate its schools.

The group's intimidating actions were so severe that a federal judge said they amounted to terrorism and placed an injunction on the organization and its affiliates to prevent them from contacting or otherwise interfering with the school board. This was the first time in U.S. history that a federal court had placed such an injunction on white supremacist intimidation. The group was affiliated with the White Citizens' Councils that existed throughout the United States during the Civil Rights Movement, as well as other state and regional segregationist organizations.

A year after its formation, White America, Inc., merged with the official White Citizens' Council chapter in Little Rock.

== Background ==
While the Civil Rights Movement was ongoing, several anti-integration groups founded to attempt to stop the racial desegregation and removals of discrimination which were beginning to occur. One such network of organizations was the White Citizens' Councils, which founded in 1954, after the landmark U.S. Supreme Court ruling Brown v. Board of Education, that same year, that stated state laws permitting white and black segregation were found to be unconstitutional. While the decision effectively overturned the Plessy v. Ferguson decision of 1896, which allowed states to segregate schools stating "separate educational facilities are inherently unequal", there was no true enforcement of this ruling in the south for many years. Blatant discrimination continued to take place for decades via Jim Crow laws, which had mandated racial segregation in all public facilities in the states of the former Confederate States of America, and continued to be enforced in many ways until 1965.

== History ==
White America, Inc., was founded by three white supremacist employees of the Cotton Belt Railroad in Pine Bluff, Arkansas, in February 1955. They formed the organization to, in the words of one of the co-founders, "perpetuate the white race and to endeavor to have this and future generations free of contamination of Negro blood". The organization's main goal was to prevent or stop racial integration in the state's schools. The president of the group stated they were going to stop "any attempts by Negroes to enter white schools" and that they would do so "on a peaceable basis_through legal action", but warned if that failed that "the people" would "take matters into their own hands". The organization believed that the Brown vs. Board of Education ruling by the United States Supreme Court violated states' rights. The co-founder and organization president, L. D. Poynter, stated at a meeting in Pine Bluff that if integration happened "in a few years we won't be able to identify ourselves as white or black". The articles of incorporation of White America, Inc., entitled the executive office of the organization to the "Pine Bluff Labor Temple".

In February 1955 the group circulated a petition to request the state to place a referendum on the ballot to force the state government to "prevent integration". The petition garnered over 6,000 signatures and was submitted to state senator Lawrence Blackwell. In February 1956, a primary gubernatorial candidate (eventually elected as the 38th Governor of Arkansas), Orval Faubus, stated he held no objections to state employees signing the petition to have a pro-segregation measure placed on the ballot that November. The following month White America, Inc., commended Faubus for his statement; according to Amis Guthridge, the group's executive secretary, Faubus had "finally declared himself for the principles which White America stands for", but stopped short of endorsing him for the 1956 Arkansas gubernatorial election.

The organization worked with other white supremacist and anti-integration groups in the state, including the Hoxie Committee for Segregation and the White Citizen's Council of Arkansas.

=== Hoxie school integration dispute ===
As in most areas in the Jim Crow south, Hoxie, Arkansas, had a segregated school system. This remained in place until June 11, 1955, after the Brown v. Board of Education ruling, the local school superintendent requested and received the unanimous support of the school board to integrate the entirety of the school system, including restrooms and cafeterias.

When local segregationists heard of the decision they converged in the summer of 1955 to attempt to intimidate the superintendent and school board to reverse the decision. They called for the removal of the local school board, and even threatened the life of the superintendent. To further intimidate the local community the groups began performing drive-by shootings of homes where black schoolchildren lived. Guthridge stated that school integration was a "plan that was founded in Moscow in 1924 to mongrelize the white race in America" and claimed that white Methodist women "want integration so that the Negro can get in the white bedroom".

In Hoxie School District No. 46 of Lawrence Co., Ark. v. Brewer, 137 F. Supp. 364, the first time the federal government had ever intervened in a case of white supremacist's intimidation, U.S. federal judge Albert L. Reeves ruled that the actions by the anti-integration groups amounted to acts of terrorism, and ordered them to stop interfering with the Hoxie school board. White America, Inc., immediately appealed the injunction to the Eighth Circuit Court of Appeals, which upheld the ruling by the lower court. The Eighth Circuit ruling stated that the segregationists' conduct "was deliberately aimed at preventing the school board from affording to all the children within the school district the equal protection of the laws".

Assisted by the Hoxie Committee for Segregation, White America, Inc., began a campaign to enroll over 100,000 members statewide for $2 ($18.23 adjusted for inflation in 2018) a year. Guthridge, stated they intended to enlist over two thousand people in Lawrence County alone, after the Hoxie school integration dispute.

== Merger ==
In late 1956, after the group's unsuccessful segregation attempts in Hoxie, White America, Inc., merged with the Arkansas chapter of the White Citizens' Council.

== See also ==
- Ku Klux Klan
- Dixiecrat
