= Tyrice Beverette =

American gridiron football player (born 1995)

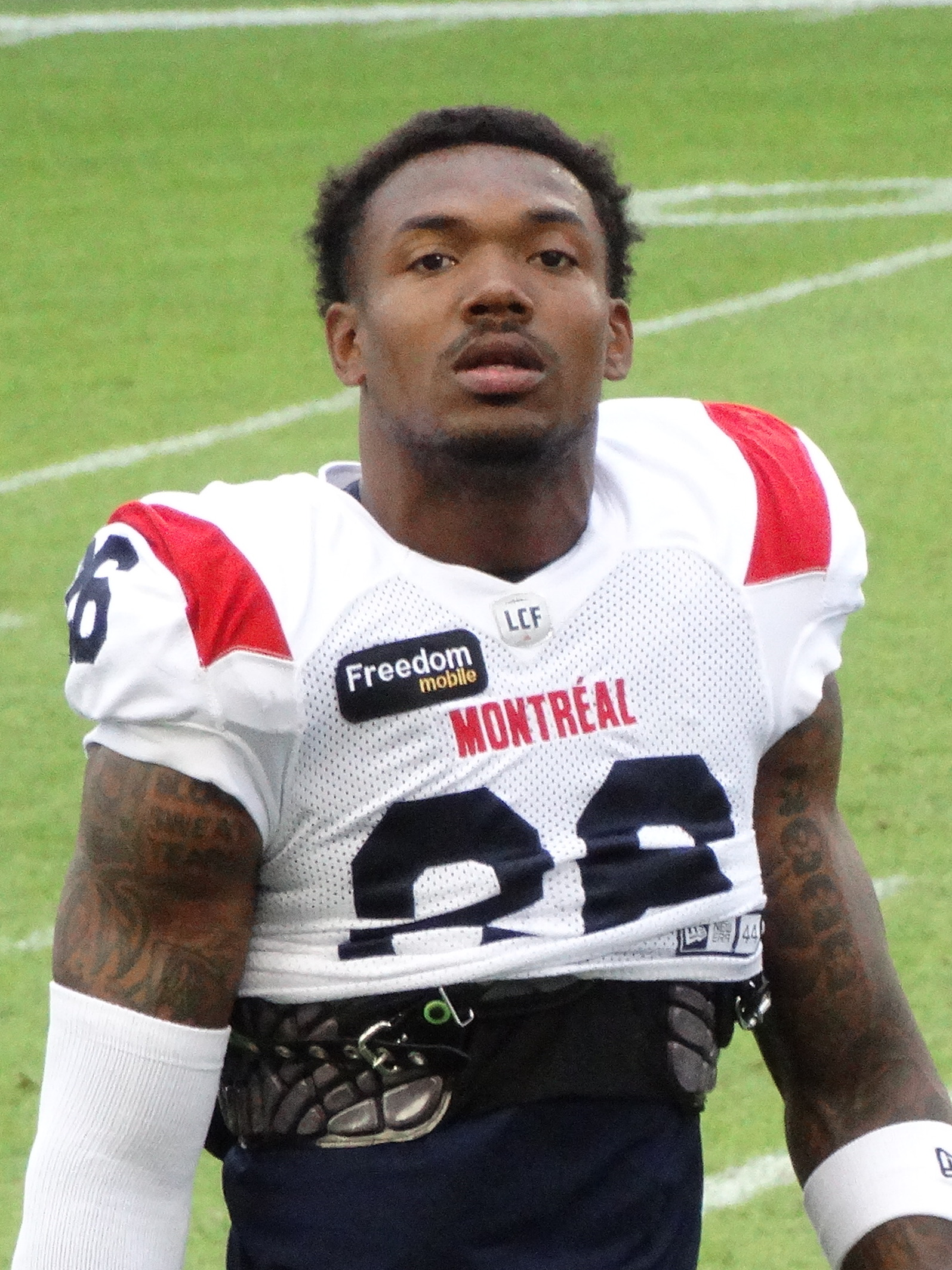
- Beverette with the Montreal Alouettes in 2024

No. 26 – Montreal Alouettes
- Position: Linebacker
- Roster status: Active
- CFL status: American

Personal information
- Born: January 28, 1995 (age 31); Lakewood, New Jersey, U.S.
- Listed height: 6 ft 0 in (1.83 m)
- Listed weight: 200 lb (91 kg)

Career information
- College: Stony Brook

Career history
- Cincinnati Bengals (2018)*; Hamilton Tiger-Cats (2019–2021); Montreal Alouettes (2022–present)
- * Offseason or practice squad member only

Awards and highlights
- Grey Cup champion (2023); James P. McCaffrey Trophy (2024); 2× CFL All-Star (2024, 2025); 4× CFL East All-Star (2023, 2024, 2025, 2026)
- Stats at CFL.ca

Tyrice Beverette (born January 28, 1995) is an American professional football linebacker for the Montreal Alouettes of the Canadian Football League (CFL).

== Early life ==
Raised in Lakewood Township, New Jersey, Beverette graduated from Lakewood High School in 2013.

== College career ==
Beverette played college football for the Stony Brook Seawolves from 2014 to 2017 after taking a redshirt season in 2013. He played in 44 games where he had 262 tackles, 27.5 tackles for a loss, 14 sacks, five interceptions, and seven forced fumbles.

== Professional career ==
Pre-draft measurables
Height	Weight	Arm length	Hand span	Wingspan	40-yard dash	10-yard split	20-yard split	20-yard shuttle	Three-cone drill	Vertical jump	Broad jump
6 ft 0 1/4 in (1.84 m)	203 lb (92 kg)	31 7/8 in (0.81 m)	9 3/8 in (0.24 m)	6 ft 4 1/2 in (1.94 m)	4.58 s	1.56 s	2.60 s	4.20 s	7.07 s	36.5 in (0.93 m)	10 ft 2 in (3.10 m)
All values from Pro Day

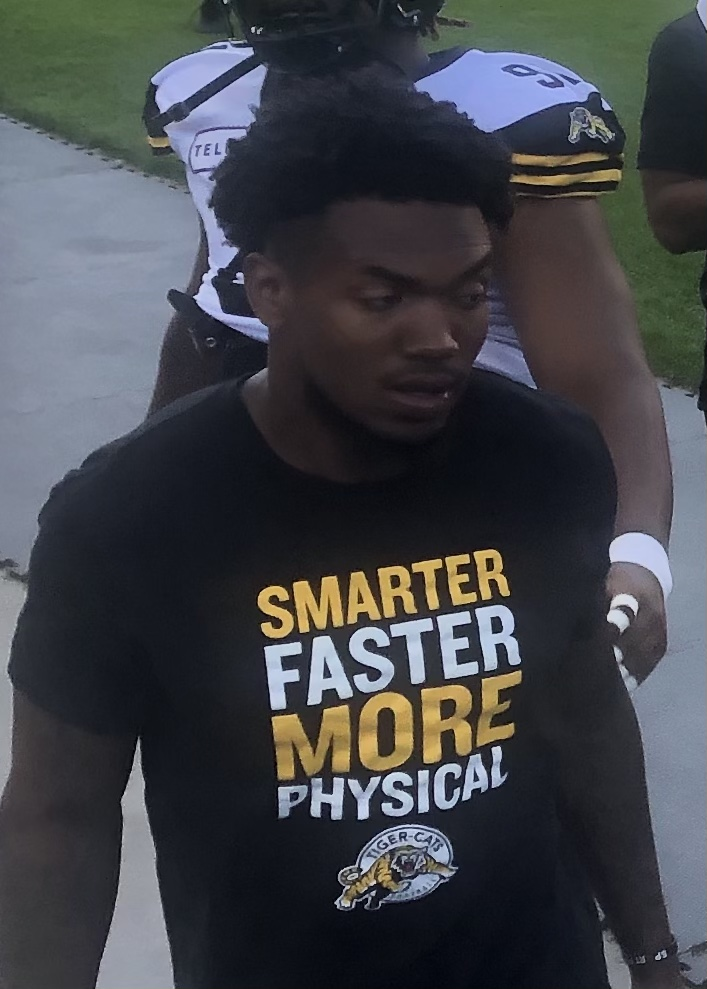
Beverette with the Hamilton Tiger-Cats in 2019

=== Cincinnati Bengals ===
After attending a tryout, Beverette signed with the Cincinnati Bengals on May 14, 2018. However, he was released with the final cuts following training camp on September 1, 2018.

=== Hamilton Tiger-Cats ===
Beverette signed with the Hamilton Tiger-Cats on May 19, 2019. He began the season on the practice roster, but played in his first career professional game on July 26, 2019, against the Winnipeg Blue Bombers. He played in 13 regular season games where he had nine defensive tackles and 19 special teams tackles. Beverette also played in his first Grey Cup championship game, but the Tiger-Cats lost to the Blue Bombers in the 107th Grey Cup game.

He did not play in 2020 due to the cancellation of the 2020 CFL season and signed a contract extension on January 5, 2021. He played in nine regular season games in 2021 where he had seven defensive tackles and eight special teams tackles. He became a free agent upon the expiry of his contract on February 8, 2022.

=== Montreal Alouettes ===
On February 8, 2022, it was announced that Beverette had signed with the Montreal Alouettes. In 2022, he played in all 18 games, starting in 14, where he had 56 defensive tackles, 21 special teams tackles, four pass knockdowns, one interception, and one forced fumble. He also scored his first career touchdown when he returned an interception 100 yards on October 1, 2022, against the Edmonton Elks.

In the 2023 season, Beverette started all 18 regular season games where he had 89 defensive tackles, 20 special teams tackles, four pass knockdowns, seven sacks, and four fumble recoveries, two of which were returned for touchdowns. For his outstanding season, he was named a CFL All-Star for the first time in his career. In the team's two playoff games, he recorded 15 defensive tackles and one special teams tackle as the Alouettes qualified for the 110th Grey Cup. In the Grey Cup game, Beverette had seven defensive tackles and one special teams tackle in the team's victory over the Winnipeg Blue Bombers.
