= Kabion Ento =

American football player (born 1996)

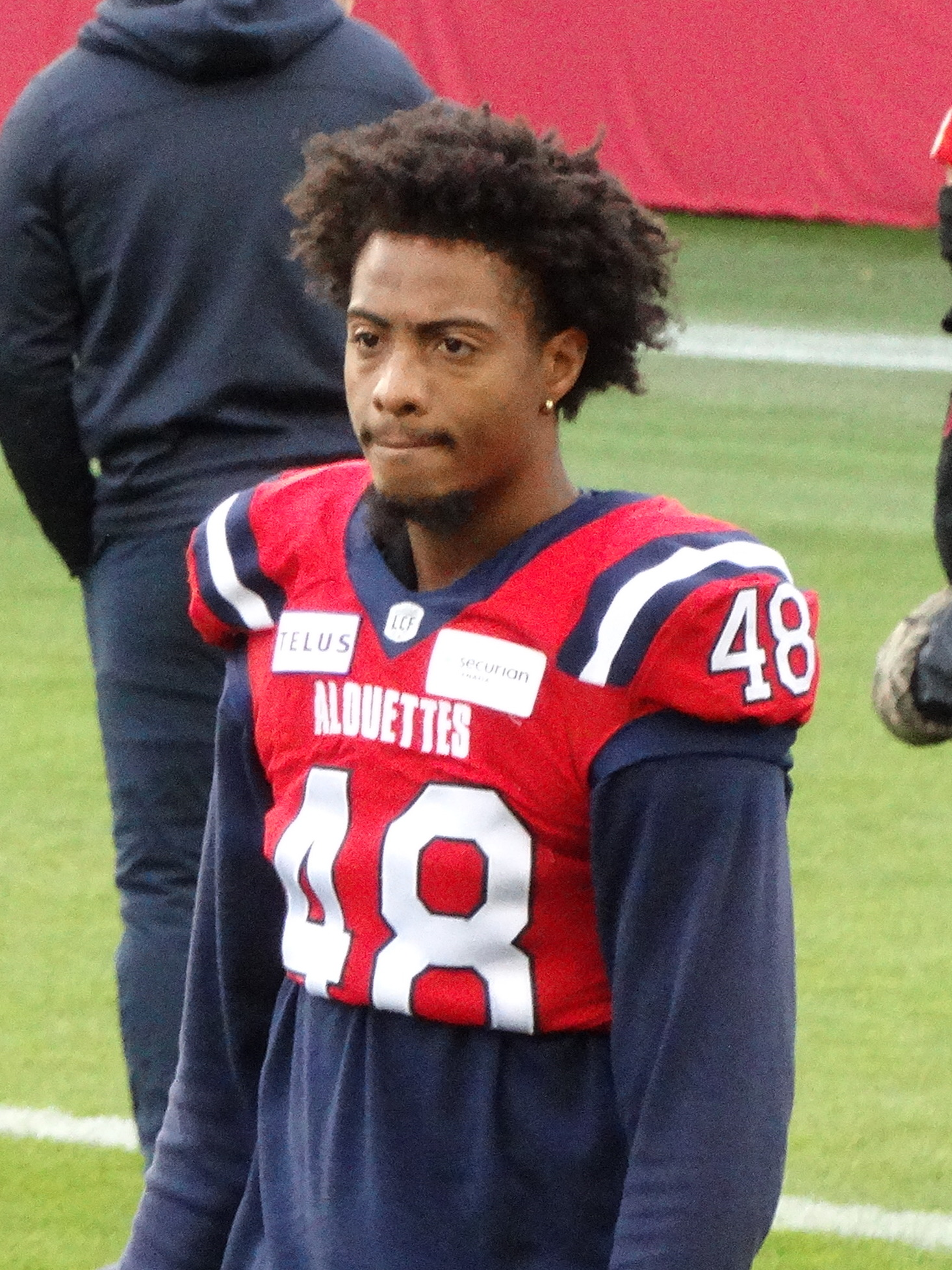
- Ento with the Montreal Alouettes in 2023

No. 48 – Montreal Alouettes
- Position: Defensive back
- Roster status: Active
- CFL status: American

Personal information
- Born: January 3, 1996 (age 30); Pine Bluff, Arkansas, U.S.
- Listed height: 6 ft 1 in (1.85 m)
- Listed weight: 187 lb (85 kg)

Career information
- High school: Dollarway (Pine Bluff, Arkansas)
- College: Colorado
- NFL draft: 2019: undrafted

Career history
- Green Bay Packers (2019–2021); Montreal Alouettes (2023–present)

Awards and highlights
- Grey Cup champion (2023); CFL East All-Star (2024)
- Stats at Pro Football Reference
- Stats at CFL.ca

Kabion Ento (born January 3, 1996) is an American professional football defensive back for the Montreal Alouettes of the Canadian Football League (CFL). He played college football at Colorado as a wide receiver and was signed by the Green Bay Packers as an undrafted free agent in 2019, spending until 2022 with the team.

== Early life ==
Ento was born on January 3, 1996, in Pine Bluff, Arkansas. He attended Dollarway High School there, playing three sports: football, basketball, and track. He was an all-state selection in all three. In football, he was a three-year starter on both sides of the ball, registering more than 1,500 receiving yards on offense and 13 interceptions on defense. As a senior, he made eight interceptions on defense, returning two for touchdowns, and 15 pass deflections, earning him Southeast Arkansas defensive player of the year honors. He also made 30 catches for 650 yards and 12 touchdowns on offense that year, as he helped them achieve a 13–1 record.

== College career ==
=== East Central ===
Ento committed to East Central College in Mississippi, and played two years for the school. As a freshman, he recorded 21 catches for 278 yards and two touchdowns. In his sophomore year, Ento made 38 receptions for 607 yards and eight scores, with an average of 16 yards per catch. His longest play with the team was against Mississippi Delta, in which he scored on a 79-yard touchdown. He was named first-team South All-State and first-team NJCAA All-Region 23 following his sophomore year.

=== Colorado ===
Ento transferred to the University of Colorado as a junior, playing in all 13 games. He was a starter in one, replacing the injured Bryce Bobo. On his first collegiate touch at Colorado, Ento made a 69-yard touchdown reception against Idaho State. He also scored on his second catch later in the game, on a 19-yard pass from Steven Montez. He finished the year with eight receptions for 174 yards and two scores, with an average of 21.8 yards per.

As a senior in 2017, Ento redshirted. In 2018, he appeared in every game, and started in one. Ento made 12 receptions for 161 yards on the year, with most coming at the end of the year when he saw time due to multiple Colorado injuries. He made a career-high five catches for 82 yards against Arizona. Ento also played on special teams, making five tackles. After the season, he was awarded the Derek Singleton Award, given to the Colorado player who shows the most "spirit, dedication and enthusiasm."

== Professional career ==
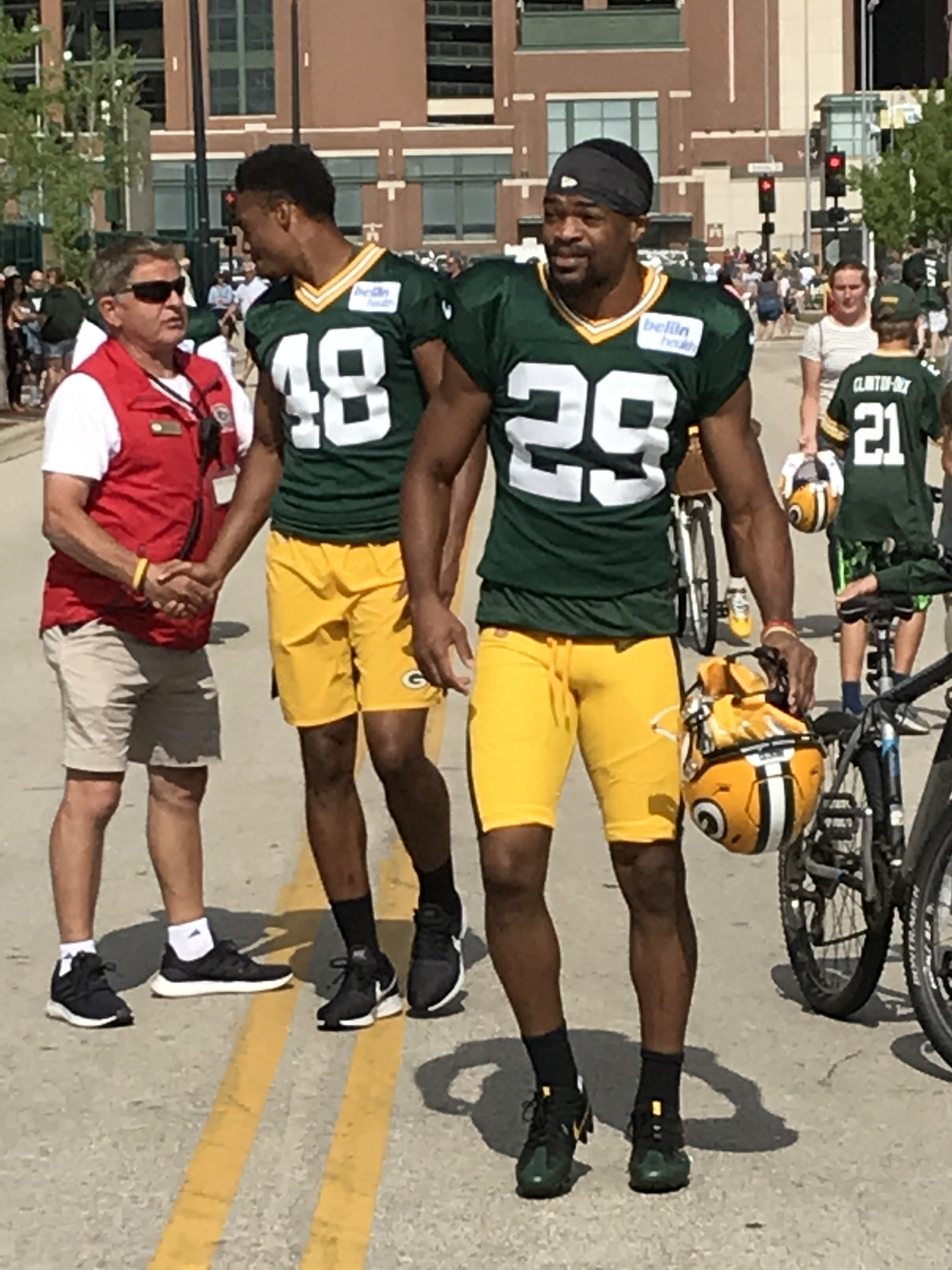
Ento (left, #48) with the Green Bay Packers in 2019

=== Green Bay Packers ===
Ento switched to cornerback after graduating from Colorado, and was signed by the Green Bay Packers as an undrafted free agent following the 2019 NFL draft. Despite impressing in training camp, he was waived at the final roster cuts on August 31. He was signed to a reserve/futures contract on January 21, 2020, but spent the entire 2020 season on injured reserve.

In a 2021 preseason game against the Houston Texans, Ento intercepted a pass and made two tackles, earning an 82.4 grade by Pro Football Focus, highest on the team. He was waived at the final roster cuts but re-signed to the practice squad the next day.

On January 25, 2022, he signed a reserve/future contract with the Packers. He was waived on August 30.

=== Montreal Alouettes ===
Ento was signed by the Montreal Alouettes of the Canadian Football League (CFL) on January 16, 2023. He began the 2023 season on the practice roster, but eventually played and started in 15 regular season games where he had 48 defensive tackles, three interceptions, and seven pass knockdowns.
