= Walter Fletcher =

Walter Fletcher may refer to:

- Walter Morley Fletcher (1873–1933), British physiologist and university administrator
- Walter Fletcher (politician) (1892–1956), British Conservative Member of Parliament
- Walter Fletcher (running back)
