= Jeshrun Antwi =

Canadian gridiron football player (born 1996)

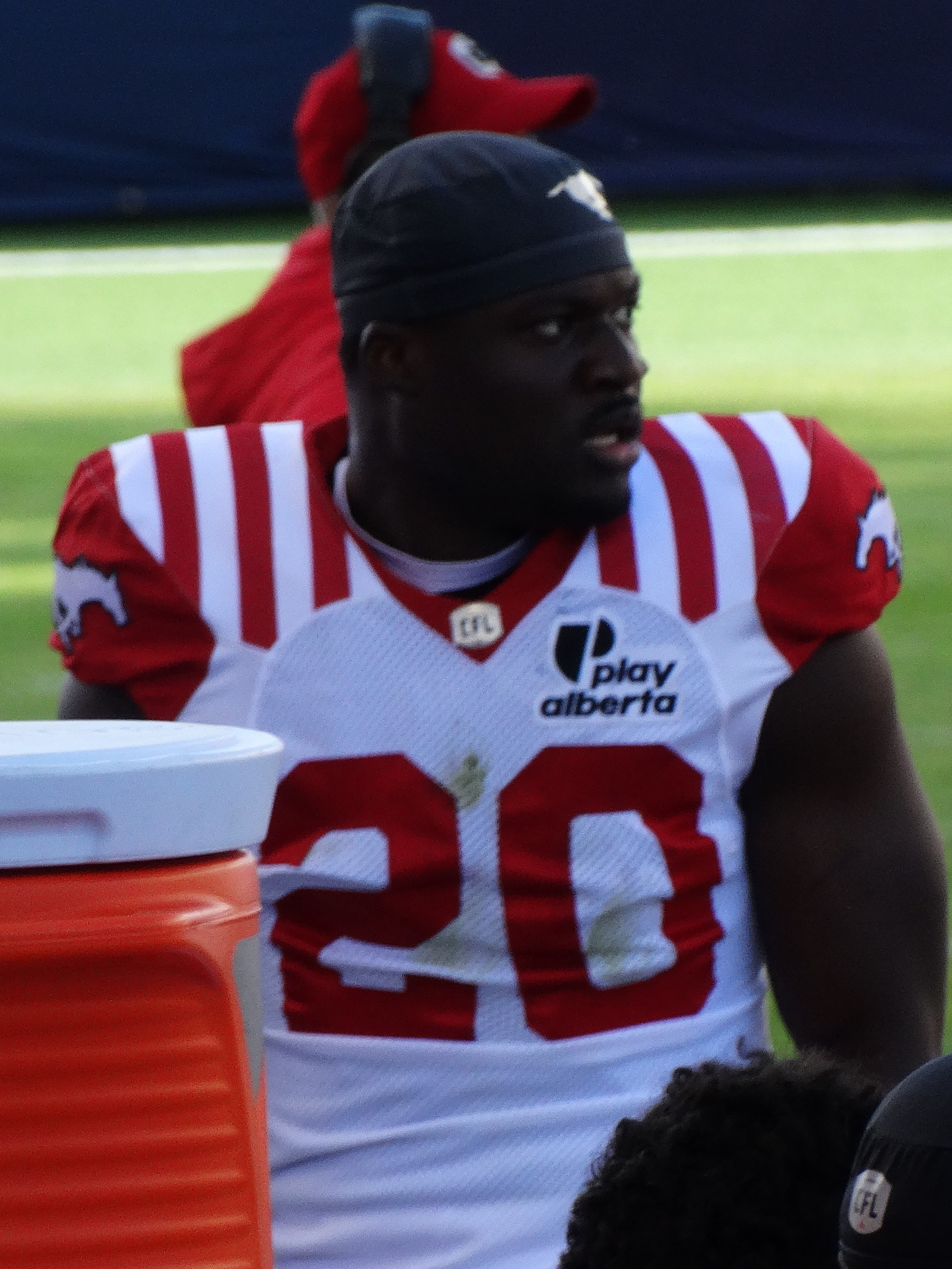
- Antwi with the Calgary Stampeders in 2025

Profile
- Position: Running back

Personal information
- Born: October 4, 1997 (age 29); Israel
- Listed height: 6 ft 0 in (1.83 m)
- Listed weight: 207 lb (94 kg)

Career information
- High school: Father Lacombe High
- University: Calgary
- CFL draft: 2019: 6th round, 48th overall pick

Career history
- 2019: Montreal Alouettes*
- 2020–2024: Montreal Alouettes
- 2024: BC Lions
- 2025: Calgary Stampeders
- * Offseason or practice squad member only

Awards and highlights
- Grey Cup champion (2023); Vanier Cup champion (2019)

Career CFL statistics
- Rushing attempts: 216
- Rushing yards: 1,154
- Rushing TDs: 1
- Receptions: 52
- Receiving yards: 342
- Receiving TDs: 0
- Stats at CFL.ca

Jeshrun Antwi-Boasiako (born October 4, 1997) is an Israeli-Canadian former professional football running back who played five seasons in the Canadian Football League (CFL) for the Montreal Alouettes, BC Lions, and Calgary Stampeders.

== Early life ==
Antwi was born in Israel, and moved to Ghana when he was five years old, where he primarily played soccer growing up. He moved to Calgary with his mother, Ama Kesewaa, when he was 12 years old and began playing gridiron football when he was 14.

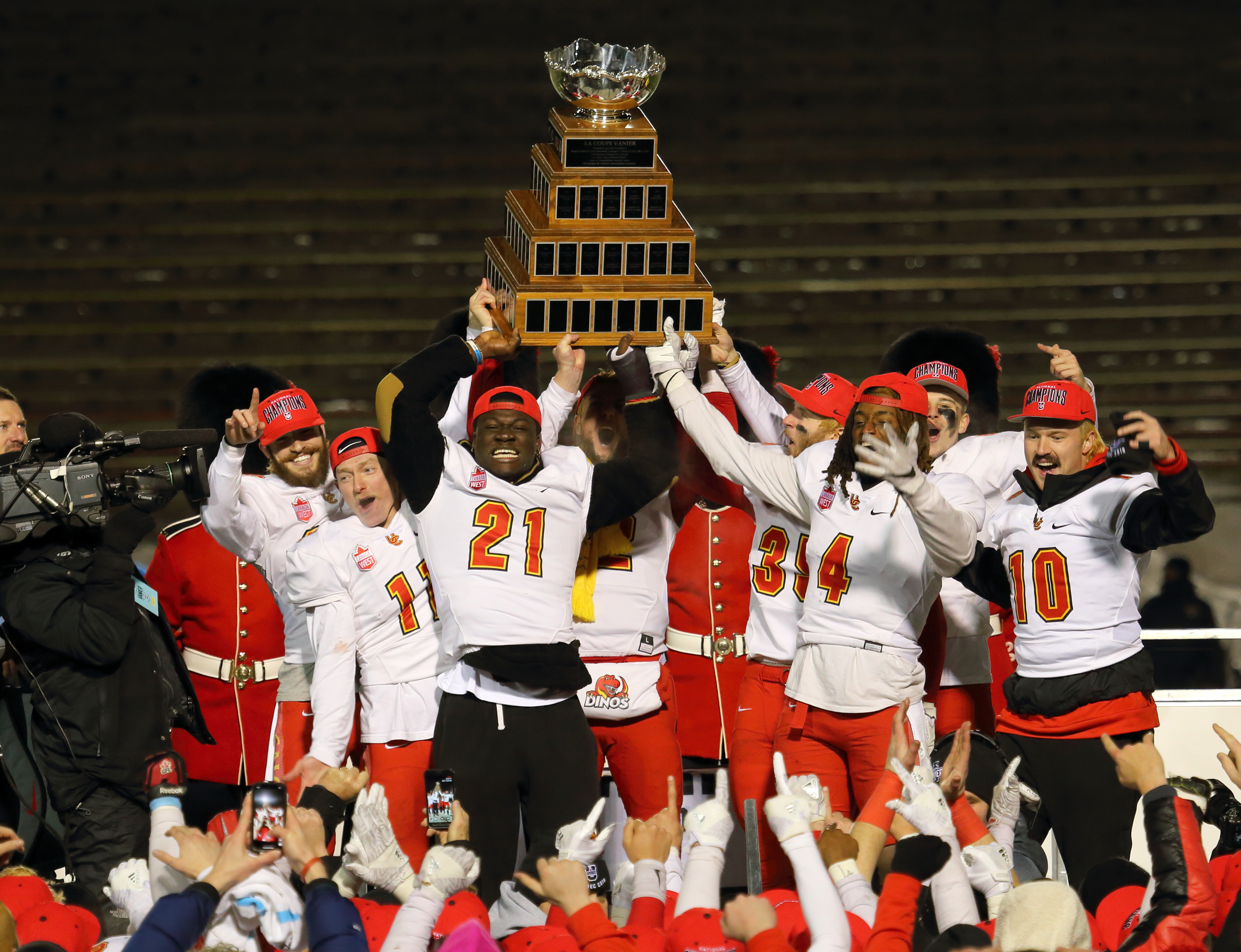
Antwi (21) winning the Vanier Cup with the Dinos in 2019

== University career ==
Antwi played U Sports football for the Calgary Dinos from 2015 to 2019. In 2016, he notably had 122 yards from scrimmage and two touchdowns in the Hardy Cup victory over the UBC Thunderbirds. He then played in his first Vanier Cup game in the 52nd Vanier Cup, where he had 25 carries for 177 yards, but the Dinos lost to the Laval Rouge et Or by a score of 31 to 26. In his fifth year with the team, the Dinos returned to the Vanier Cup, but Antwi did not play due to injury. The Dinos defeated the Montreal Carabins 27 to 13 in the 55th Vanier Cup as Antwi finished his university career as a national champion.

== Professional career ==
Pre-draft measurables
Height	Weight	40-yard dash	20-yard shuttle	Three-cone drill	Vertical jump	Broad jump	Bench press
6 ft 0 in (1.83 m)	205 lb (93 kg)	4.75 s	4.56 s	7.28 s	32.5 in (0.83 m)	9 ft 6 7/8 in (2.92 m)	18 reps
All values from CFL Combine

=== Montreal Alouettes ===
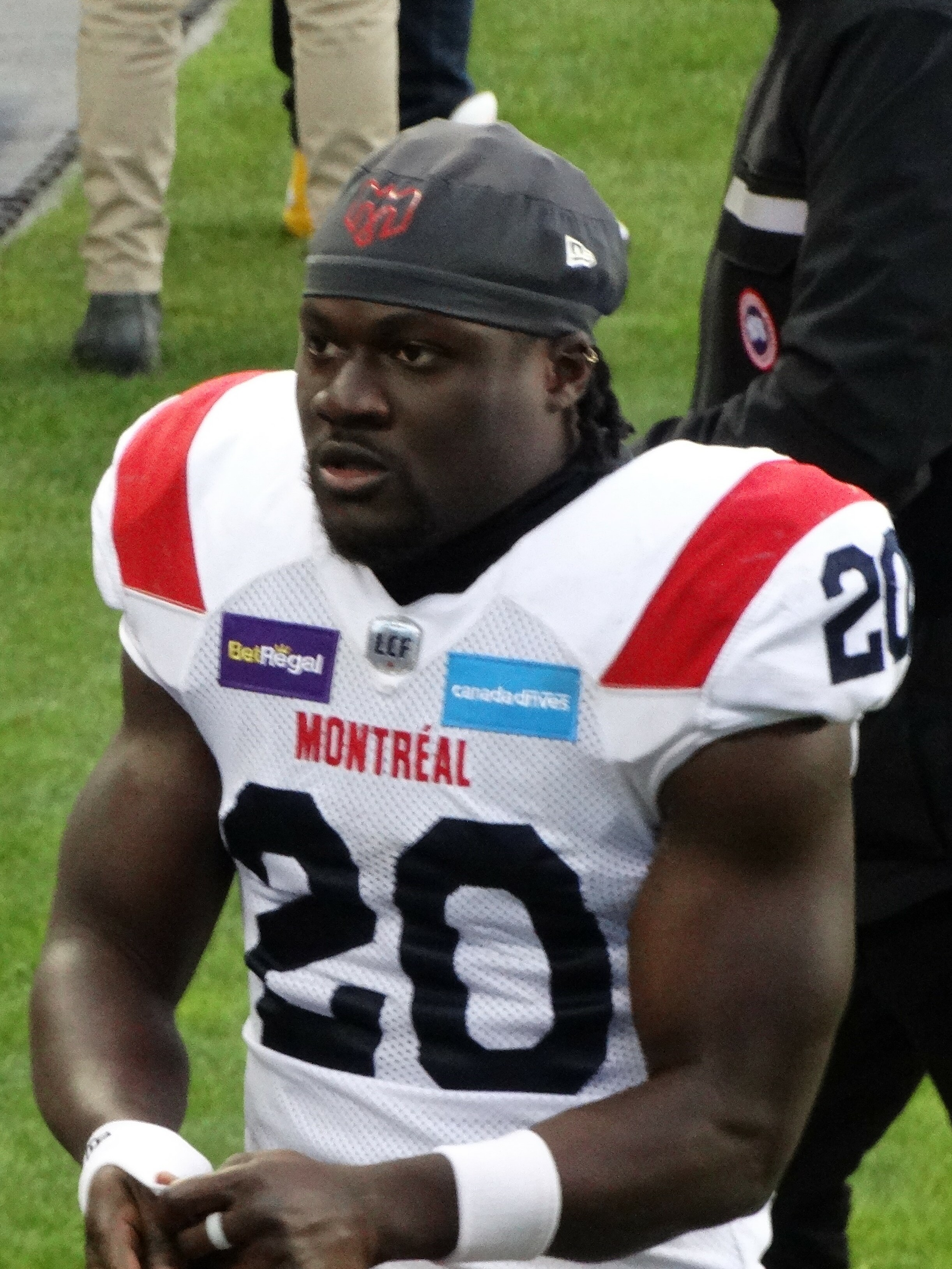
Antwi with the Montreal Alouettes in 2022

After becoming eligible for the 2019 CFL draft, Antwi was drafted in the sixth round, 48th overall, by the Montreal Alouettes and signed with the team on May 6, 2019. He played in both preseason games with the team in 2019, but elected to return to school following training camp.

After completing his university playing eligibility, Antwi re-signed with the Alouettes on November 28, 2019. However, the 2020 CFL season was cancelled and he did not play in 2020. After making the team following training camp in 2021, he played in his first professional game on August 14, 2021, against the Edmonton Elks, where he had four carries for 13 yards. He played in all 14 regular season games where he had 36 rush attempts for 176 yards and six receptions for 46 yards. He had a career-high 13 carries for 69 yards in the regular season finale, but also had two costly fumbles as the Alouettes lost to the Ottawa Redblacks. He signed a two-year contract extension with the Alouettes on January 31, 2022.

In 2022, Antwi began the season as the backup running back, but was thrust into the starting role following an injury to William Stanback in the first game of the season. He started six of the next seven games where he had 48 carries for 255 yards and 11 catches for 78 yards before relinquishing the starting role to Tavien Feaster and then Walter Fletcher. Antwi finished the year as the team's leading rusher with 106 carries for 600 yards and also had 30 receptions for 200 yards.

Antwi returned to the Alouettes in 2023 as the backup running back where he played in all 18 regular season games and had 39 carries for 229 yards and one touchdown along with 11 receptions for 75 yards and eight special teams tackles. He scored his first career touchdown on August 11, 2024, against the Saskatchewan Roughriders on a 19-yard run. Antwi also gained notoriety for successfully executing a dribble kick on September 30, 2024, against the Ottawa Redblacks when he punted one yard across the line of scrimmage and turned second-and-18 into a first down. He played in all three post-season games that year, including in his first Grey Cup game. He recorded one reception for three yards in the Alouettes' 28–24 victory over the Winnipeg Blue Bombers in the 110th Grey Cup championship.

In 2024, Antwi was the primary backup running back behind Walter Fletcher, but saw fewer touches, as he played in 15 regular season games and recorded ten carries for 20 yards and five receptions for 21 yards.

=== BC Lions ===
On October 2, 2024, on the day of the trade deadline, Antwi was traded to the BC Lions in exchange for a third-round pick in the 2025 CFL draft. He played in three regular season games where he had nine carries for 73 yards.

=== Calgary Stampeders ===
As a free agent from the Lions, Anwti signed with the Calgary Stampeders on February 11, 2025. He played in ten games in 2025 where he had 16 rushing attempts for 56 yards. He announced his retirement in the following offseason on January 6, 2026.

Political Career

Jeshrun won a tightly competed election for the University of Calgary 1L rep role.
