= Joseph B. Fuller =

American academic and management consultant

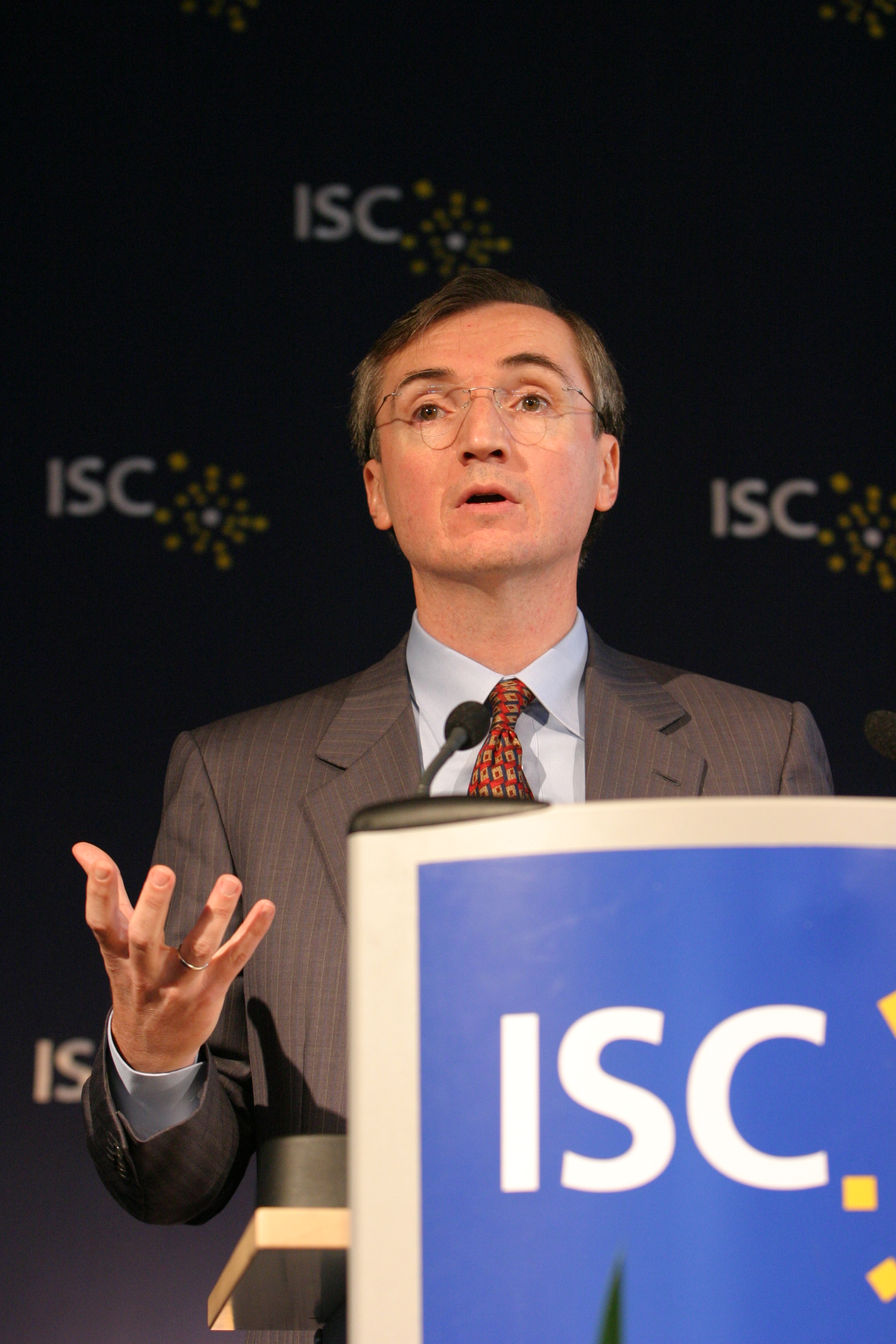
- Education: Harvard University
- Occupation: Academic
- Employer: Harvard Business School
- Parent(s): Stephen H. Fuller; Frances Mulhearn
- Relatives: Mark B. Fuller (brother)

Joseph B. Fuller is an American academic and management consultant. He is the co-founder of the Monitor Group, now known as Monitor Deloitte. He is a professor of management practice at the Harvard Business School, Faculty Co-Director at the Project on Workforce at Harvard, and serves as chair of the Board of Trustees of Western Governors University. He has authored business cases about many companies, including Saudi Aramco and DaVita Inc. He has published research about dividend policy, income inequality in the United States and the skills gap.

== Early life ==
Joseph B. Fuller is the son of Stephen H. Fuller, a former professor and associate dean at the Harvard Business School. He has three brothers, Mark B. Fuller, Teofilo Fuller, and Roger Palaganas. He graduated from the Harvard University in 1981.

== Business career ==
In 1983, Fuller co-founded the Monitor Group, a consulting firm, with his brother Mark and HBS colleague Michael Porter. From 1994 to 2006, he was the chief executive officer of its commercial consulting operations. The company went bankrupt in 2013, and later became known as Monitor Deloitte.

Fuller has served on the board of directors of PVH since 1992.

== Academia and commentaries ==
Fuller is a professor of management practice at the Harvard Business School. He serves as a member-at-large of the Harvard College Fund. He has authored business cases about Terrapin Laboratory, Loki Capital Management, DaVita Inc., MuMaté, Hövding, GenapSys, HourlyNerd, and Saudi Aramco. He has published research about dividend policy, income inequality and the skills gap.

With Michael C. Jensen, Fuller argued that dividend policy was critical to solving the politics of agency costs between shareholders and senior executives. As a result, they agreed with Richard C. Breeden, the former chairman of the SEC, that companies should give high dividends to their shareholders annually to make sure their investments were based on dynamic capital market returns and avoid wasting resources on unnecessary investments or extravagant compensations.

Fuller suggested that educators and employers would have to work together to address the skills gap. With his colleagues Jan W. Rivkin and Karen Mills, Fuller argued that fostering shared prosperity would entail the collective impact of leaders in "government, business, education, nonprofits, labor, philanthropy" and other sectors.

With Matthew Sigelman, Fuller argued that the Trans-Pacific Partnership could not explain high unemployment rates and low wages in the United States; instead, globalization led to a skills gap and the US workforce needed to be retrained to fill new highly skilled jobs. Taking the example of J.P. Morgan, which announced they would train their employees to make sure they could be promoted, Fuller and Sigelman encouraged US companies to do the same, adding that such an investment would foster soft skills.

In the wake of Donald Trump's victory, Fuller argued the skills gap would have to be tackled. To do this, Fuller suggested the United States Department of Education should broaden the scope of Pell Grants to enable non-traditional college students in programs co-sponsored by a company to qualify; make it mandatory for colleges to disclose their graduation rates; encourage apprenticeships; review accreditation standards.
