= Jan W. Rivkin =

American academic (born 1966)

Jan Winter Rivkin
- Born: c. 1966
- Education: Centennial High School
- Alma mater: Princeton University; London School of Economics; Harvard University
- Occupation: Academic
- Employer: Harvard Business School
- Spouse: Deborah Sharon Kadish
- Parent(s): Maxcy Rivkin; Judith Hirschman

Jan W. Rivkin (born c. 1966) is an American academic. He is the Bruce V. Rauner Professor of Business Administration at the Harvard Business School. He has published research about strategy, competitiveness and income inequality in the United States

== Early life ==
Jan W. Rivkin was born circa 1966. He descends from an old Jewish family present in Charleston, South Carolina since the 1800s; his parents are donors to the Jewish Studies Center at the College of Charleston. He grew up in Ellicott City, Maryland.

Rivkin was educated at the Centennial High School in Ellicott City. He graduated from Princeton University. He earned a master's degree from the London School of Economics after he was awarded the Marshall Scholarship, and a PhD in Economics from Harvard University.

== Career ==
Rivkin previously worked as a consultant for the Monitor Group. He is the Bruce V. Rauner Professor of Business Administration at the Harvard Business School. He has published research about strategy, competitiveness and income inequality in the United States.

In 2012, with his colleague Michael Porter, Rivkin suggested that American competitiveness could be restored if companies decided to avoid offshoring to save on hidden costs like "lower foreign worker productivity, quality problems, and loss of intellectual property"; invest in teaching employable skills to high school and college students to produce suitable workers; foster innovation by funding relevant university research; offer in-person or online training to their employees; and avoid lobbying for unfair tax breaks which distort the market.

In 2015, Rivkin and Porter suggested that the 1% should foster shared prosperity by focusing not on philanthropy and political donations, but finding business-oriented ways to improve the commons (infrastructure, schools and universities, employment skills) at the local level. With his colleagues Joseph B. Fuller and Karen Mills, Rivkin argued that shared prosperity would entail the collective impact of leaders in "government, business, education, nonprofits, labor, philanthropy" and other sectors.

Being a prolific case writer, Rivkin has also featured among the top 40 case authors consistently, since the list was first published in 2016 by The Case Centre. He ranked 33rd In 2018/19, 29th in 2017/18, 33rd in 2016/17 and 29th in 2015/16.

== Personal life ==
Rivkin is married to Deborah Sharon Kadish, and he has two sons. They reside in Newton, Massachusetts.
