= Stanford Social Innovation Review =

US magazine

- Editor: Johanna Mair (academic editor); Bryan Maygers (deputy editor, digital); David V. Johnson (deputy editor, print); Aaron Bady (editor); Barbara Wheeler-Bride (editor, digital); Jenifer Morgan (global editions editor)
- Categories: Social innovation magazine
- Frequency: Quarterly
- Publisher: Stanford Center on Philanthropy and Civil Society, Stanford University: Brian Karo (publishing and marketing manager); Allison Agnello (marketing coordinator); Yulia Strokova (publishing production coordinator)
- First issue: Spring 2003
- Country: United States
- Based in: Stanford, California
- Language: English
- Website: ssir.org
- ISSN: 1542-7099

Stanford Social Innovation Review (SSIR) is a magazine and website that covers cross-sector solutions to global problems. SSIR is written by and for social change leaders from around the world and from all sectors of society—nonprofits, foundations, business, government, and engaged citizens. SSIR's mission is to advance, educate, and inspire the field of social innovation by seeking out, cultivating, and disseminating the best in research- and practice-based knowledge. With print and online articles, webinars, conferences, podcasts, and more, SSIR bridges research, theory, and practice on a wide range of topics, including human rights, impact investing, and nonprofit business models. SSIR is published by the Stanford Center on Philanthropy and Civil Society at Stanford University.

The publication was founded in 2003 by the Center for Social Innovation (CSI), a Hewlett Foundation grantee at the Stanford Graduate School of Business. Now, SSIR receives about 2.5 million total unique visitors annually. Outside of the US, the site receives the most traffic from Canada, India, the UK, the Philippines, and Australia.

SSIR frequently publishes in-depth series in partnership with organizations such as the Bridgespan Group, Mission Investors Exchange, BBB's Give.org, Third Sector Capital Partners, and The Communications Network.

== Mission ==
SSIR aims to advance, educate, and inspire the field of social innovation by seeking out, cultivating, and disseminating the best in research- and practice-based knowledge.

== History and impact ==
SSIR was launched in 2003 by the Center for Social Innovation (CSI) at the Stanford Graduate School of Business. Beginning in 2010, SSIR has been published at the Stanford Center on Philanthropy and Civil Society (PACS).

Nonprofit terms such as the nonprofit starvation cycle and collective impact were first given prominence by SSIR in 2009 and 2011, respectively. The latter term was introduced by John Kania and Mark Kramar in their article "Collective Impact", and became the number two philanthropy buzzword for 2011, according to The Chronicle of Philanthropy. It has also been recognized by the White House Council for Community Solutions.

=== Current activity ===
Since 2006, SSIR has hosted the annual Nonprofit Management Institute conference, a multi-day conference for senior-level nonprofit executives. In 2015, SSIR hosted its first annual Data on Purpose conference, which was then combined with the Do Good Data conference in 2017. In 2016, SSIR hosted the inaugural Frontiers of Social Innovation, a forum for global leaders. SSIR has also hosted a webinar series since 2009. On 10 March 2021 SSIR hosted a webinar on "Creating Impact in a Volatile World — Lessons Learned from the Front Lines", moderated by Eric Nee, Editor-in-Chief SSIR. The presenters were Jim Bildner, CEO of Draper Richards Kaplan Foundation, Kruti Bharucha, founder and CEO of Peepul India, Rebecca Taber Staehelin, cofounder and co-CEO of Merit America, Tatiana Garcia-Granados, cofounder and COO of The Common Market and Claire Chamberlain, managing director for Social Impact at Blackrock.

In 2017, SSIR launched a local-language partnership with the Leping Foundation for Social Entrepreneurship, to produce copies of the magazine in book form translated into simplified Chinese. In 2018, they added a South Korean edition in partnership with Hanyang University. Since then, they have added editions in Arabic and Spanish (in 2020), and Japanese (2021) with various partners.

=== Submission guidelines ===
SSIR seeks to present interesting, original, and important ideas about social innovation to leaders who can put those ideas to work. To that end, SSIR accepts submissions for six types of editorial articles (Book Review, Case Study, Feature, Field Report, Viewpoint, and What's Next) for their quarterly print edition. Additionally, SSIR accepts submissions of shorter works to be published online—typically of 1,200 to 2,000 words.

=== Awards ===
SSIR has won several Maggie Awards for Best Quarterly (2010, 2011, 2012, 2013, 2014) and Best Web Publication (2016), Eddie Awards (2011, 2014), an Ozzie Award for its website (2014), and Min's Best of the Web Award for Redesign (2013).
