= Stephen Fuller (disambiguation) =

Stephen Fuller (1900–1984) was an Irish Fianna Fáil Party politician.

Stephen Fuller may also refer to:

- Stephen H. Fuller (1920–2005), American academic and businessman
- Steve Fuller (American football) (born 1957), American former professional football player
- Steve Fuller (sociologist) (born 1959), Anglo-American social philosopher and professor
- Stephen Fuller (Emmerdale), fictional character in the British soap opera Emmerdale
