= Centennial High School (Maryland) =

Public high school in the Ellicott City, Maryland, U.S.

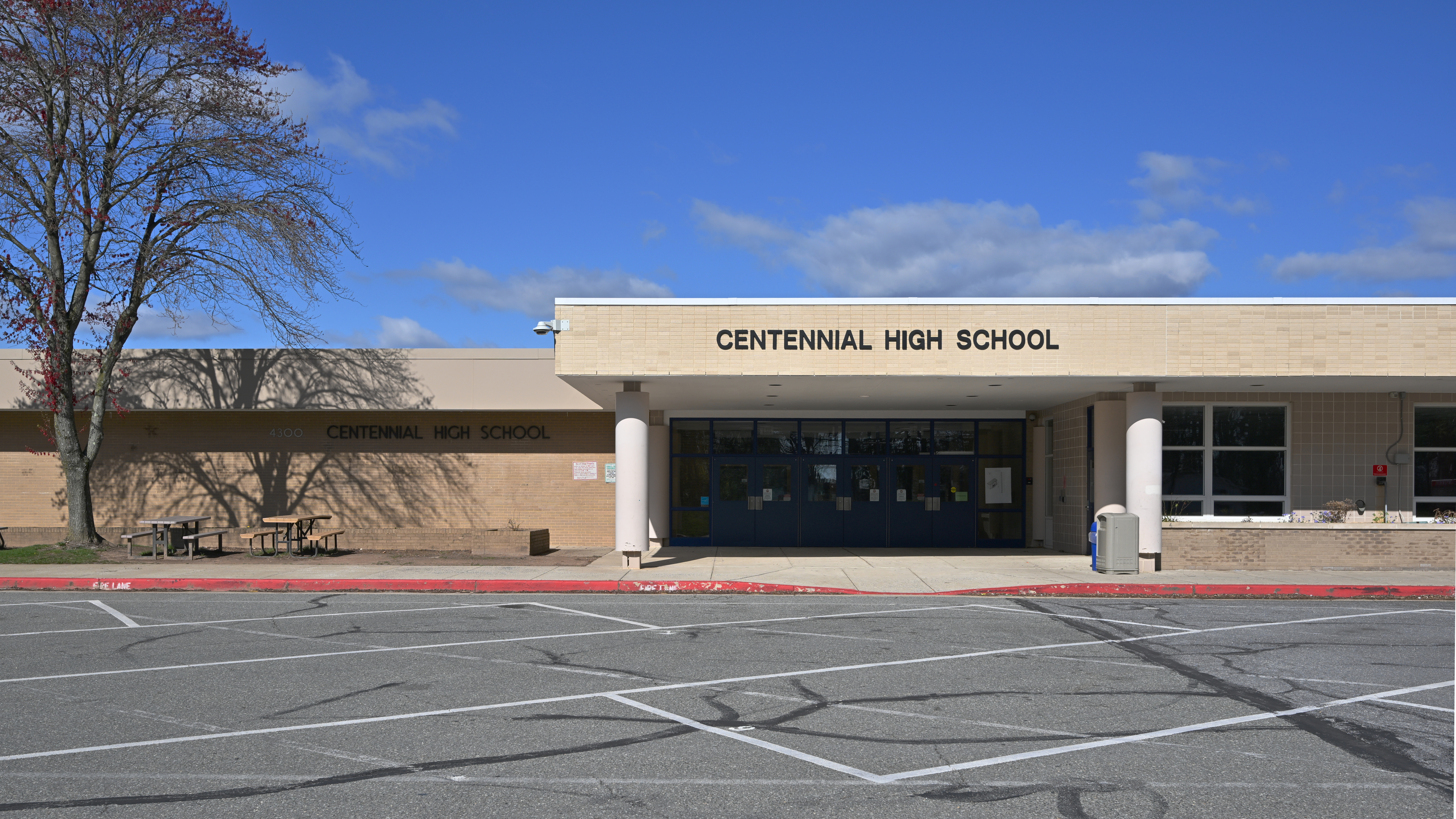

Location
- 4300 Centennial Lane, Ellicott City, MD, 21042; United States; 39°15′11″N 76°52′4″W

Information
- Type: Public high school
- Motto: Commitment to Excellence
- Established: 1977
- Principal: Joelle Miller
- Faculty: 72
- Enrollment: 1,614
- Colors: Red , White , and Blue (accent)
- Mascot: Eagle
- Rival: Mt. Hebron High School
- Newspaper: The Wingspan
- Yearbook: Eyrie
- Feeder schools: Burleigh Manor Middle School (Majority), Dunloggin Middle School, Ellicott Mills Middle School
- Website: https://chs.hcpss.org/

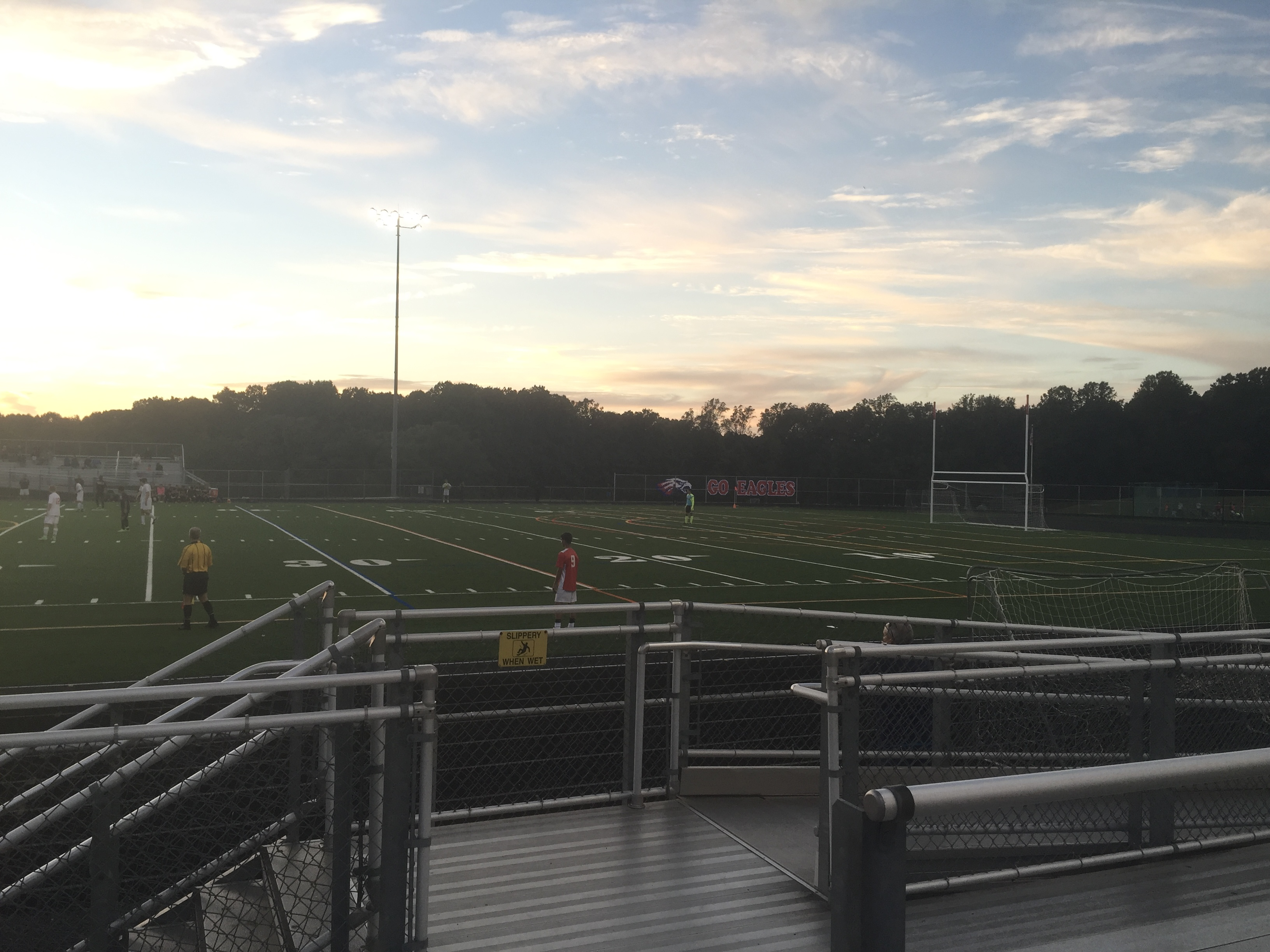
Turf field at Centennial High School

Centennial High School is a public high school in Ellicott City, Maryland, United States, that opened in 1977. The school is located in Howard County and is part of the Howard County Public School System. The school is named after its road frontage on Centennial Lane, which was built in 1876 as a shortcut through Denton Hammond's slave plantation, Burleigh Manor, between Clarksville and Ellicott City.

In 1984–85, the school was recognized as one of the top 100 high schools in the United States through the USDE Secondary School Recognition Program. In 1996, Centennial High School was the first high school within Maryland to achieve the excellence standard in all categories of the Maryland State Performance Assessment Program's (MSPAP) report card. The school maintained these standards throughout 2000 and 2001. In 2008, the school was nominated by U.S. News & World Report as a "silver medal" school, placing in the top 505 high schools nationwide. In a 2012 joint study by Newsweek and The Daily Beast, Centennial was ranked the second-best public high school in Maryland and number 111 in the nation. In 2014, Centennial was ranked as the best public school in Maryland and the United States. In 2017 the school was awarded "gold medal" by US News & World Report which ranked it as the best school nationwide.

In 2015, the Centennial mens' basketball team bested Westlake for the Maryland 3A state title.

The Centennial mens' cross country team has also won three straight 3A state championships, in 2023, 2024, and 2025.

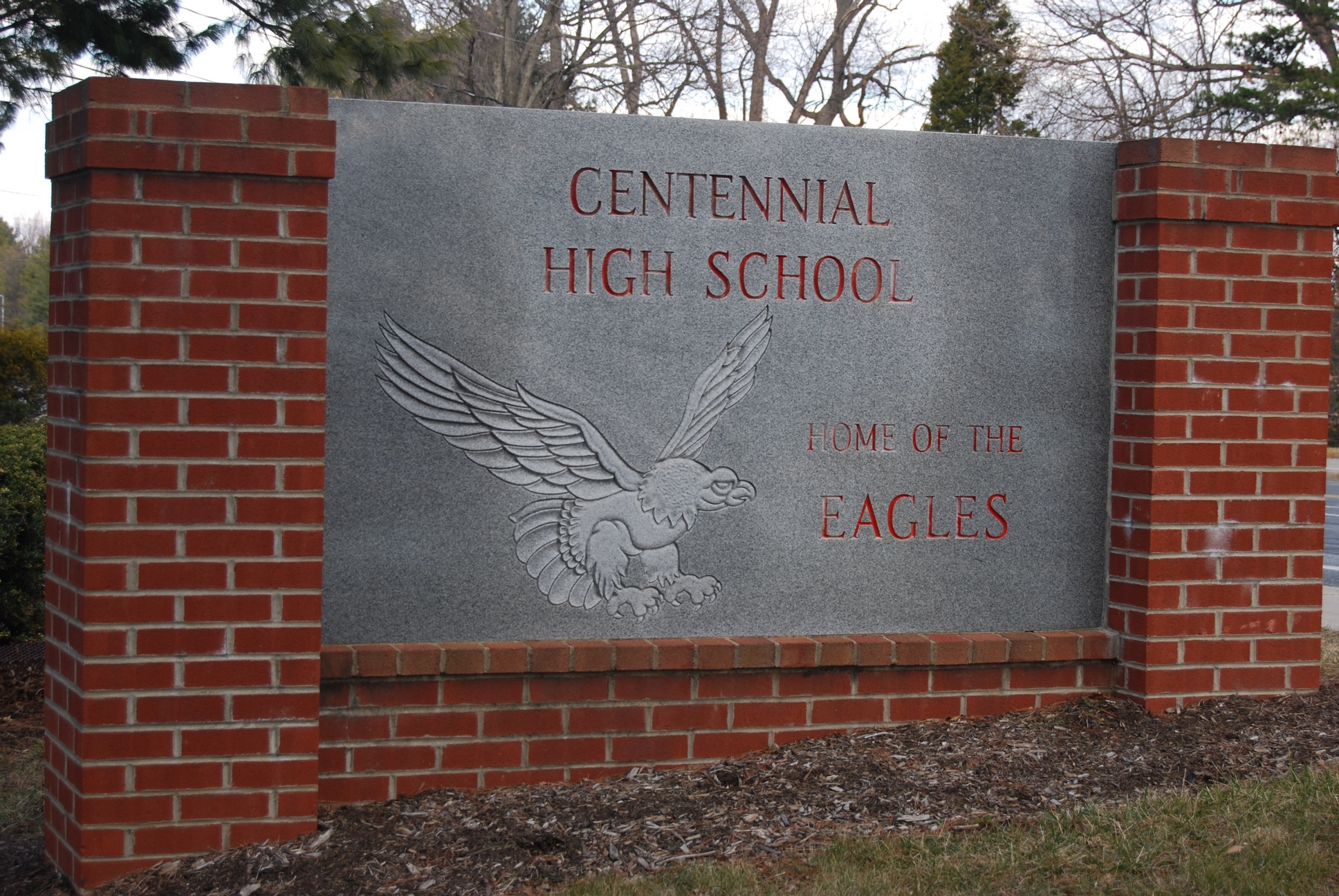
Centennial High School sign at the front entrance

The school has a maximum capacity of 1,360 students, but through the addition of nine portable classrooms currently (as of 2023) enrolls over 1,364 students. Of those in attendance, 41.7% are Asian, 38.6% are White, 8.9% are African American, 5.6% are Hispanic, 0.3% are Native American, 0.2% are Hawaiian or Pacific Islander, and 5.1% are two or more races.

== Notable alumni ==
- Dijon Duenas – Singer-songwriter
- Walter Fletcher – Professional football player
- Suzanne Malveaux – CNN anchor
- Andrew Marshall – professional soccer player
- Jan W. Rivkin – economist, Harvard Business School professor
- Aaron Russell – Olympic volleyball player
- Ken Ulman – Former Howard County Executive
