= Stephen H. Fuller =

- Born: February 4, 1920; Athens, Ohio, U.S.
- Died: January 24, 2005 (aged 84); Belmont, Massachusetts, U.S.
- Resting place: Mount Auburn Cemetery
- Education: Ohio University; Harvard Business School
- Occupation: Academic
- Employer: Harvard Business School
- Spouse: Frances Mulhearn
- Children: 4

Stephen Herbert Fuller (February 4, 1920 - January 24, 2005) was an American academic, business leader, and international development advisor, best known for his tenure as a professor and Associate Dean at Harvard Business School and later as Vice President at General Motors. Fuller’s career spanned academia, military service, global institution building, and corporate leadership.

== Early life and military career ==
Stephen H. Fuller was born on February 4, 1920, in Athens, Ohio.

Fuller came from a long line of American patriots, with family roots tracing back to the Mayflower and military service in both the Revolutionary and Civil Wars. He graduated from Ohio University in 1941, where he also won the Award of Merit.

He graduated from Harvard University and joined the U.S. Army through the Reserve Officers’ Training Corps. Commissioned on December 8, 1941, Fuller served in the Pacific Theater during World War II, earning a Presidential Unit Citation for his service in logistics and field engineering. He later joined General Douglas MacArthur’s occupation staff in Japan, contributing to post-war reconstruction and repatriation efforts. He was among the first Americans to enter Hiroshima after the atomic bombing, an experience believed to have contributed to his later health issues.

== Career ==
Following the war, Fuller earned a doctorate and joined the Harvard Business School faculty. Known for his pragmatic intellect, Fuller excelled during a period when the school emphasized applied business education. He quickly rose through the ranks and became one of the school's earliest Associate Deans, overseeing External Affairs. In this role, he was responsible for fundraising, executive education, and institutional partnerships.

Fuller played a foundational role in developing international business schools as part of Harvard’s global outreach strategy during the mid-20th century. He was instrumental in supporting the creation of institutions including IMD (Switzerland), IESE Business School (Spain), Asian Institute of Management (Philippines), where he served as founding president, IPADE (Mexico) and KAIST Business School (Korea).

He retired as the Jaime and Josefina Chua Tiampo Professor of Business Administration emeritus at the Harvard Business School.

He also advised educational initiatives in Japan and Malaysia, earning the Presidential Medal of Merit in the Philippines and honors from the monarchs of Thailand and Malaysia for his contributions to business education.

== Professional career ==
After 25 years at Harvard, Fuller transitioned into industry, joining General Motors as Vice President of Personnel and Administration. Initially overseeing the corporation’s 250,000 white-collar employees, Fuller later took on broader labor relations responsibilities, including union negotiations. His role helped shape GM’s human resources and labor policy during a time of significant industrial transition.

Fuller was also the chairman and chief executive officer of World Book Encyclopedia. In 1989, he moved their offices to suburban Chicago, namely Evanston and Elk Grove Village to cut down operating costs.

== Personal life and legacy ==
Stephen Fuller married a fellow academic and military intelligence officer Frances Mulhearn who served in the OSS during World War II and was invited to help found the CIA—an offer she declined. She later held academic positions across the U.S. and served as a trustee for institutions including Radcliffe, Simmons College, and Mount Holyoke.

They had four children: Mark B. Fuller; Joseph B. Fuller; Teofilo Fuller; and Roger Palaganas. His sons Joseph and Mark co-founded the Monitor Group, a consulting firm now known as Monitor Deloitte. Joseph is also a professor at the Harvard Business School.

Fuller died on January 24, 2005, in Belmont, Massachusetts, at the age of 84. He was buried at the Mount Auburn Cemetery.

Fuller and his widow are the namesakes of The Frances M. and Stephen H. Fuller Visiting Professorship in Southeast Asian Studies at Ohio University.

== Works ==
- Fuller, Stephen H.; Selekman, Benjamin M.; Selekman, Sylvia K. (1950). Problems in Labor Relations. New York: McGraw-Hill. OCLC 923575675.
- Bowers, David G.; Fuller, Stephen H.; Jones, Lawrence M. (1982). Management and Employee Relationships within the Federal Aviation Administration: An Analysis of Management-Employee Conflict within the Air Traffic Control System of the Federal Aviation Administration and a Program of Action to Improve Working Relationships Throughout the Organization. Washington, D.C.: Federal Aviation Administration. OCLC 8291393.
