= Peter Schwartz (futurist) =

American futurist

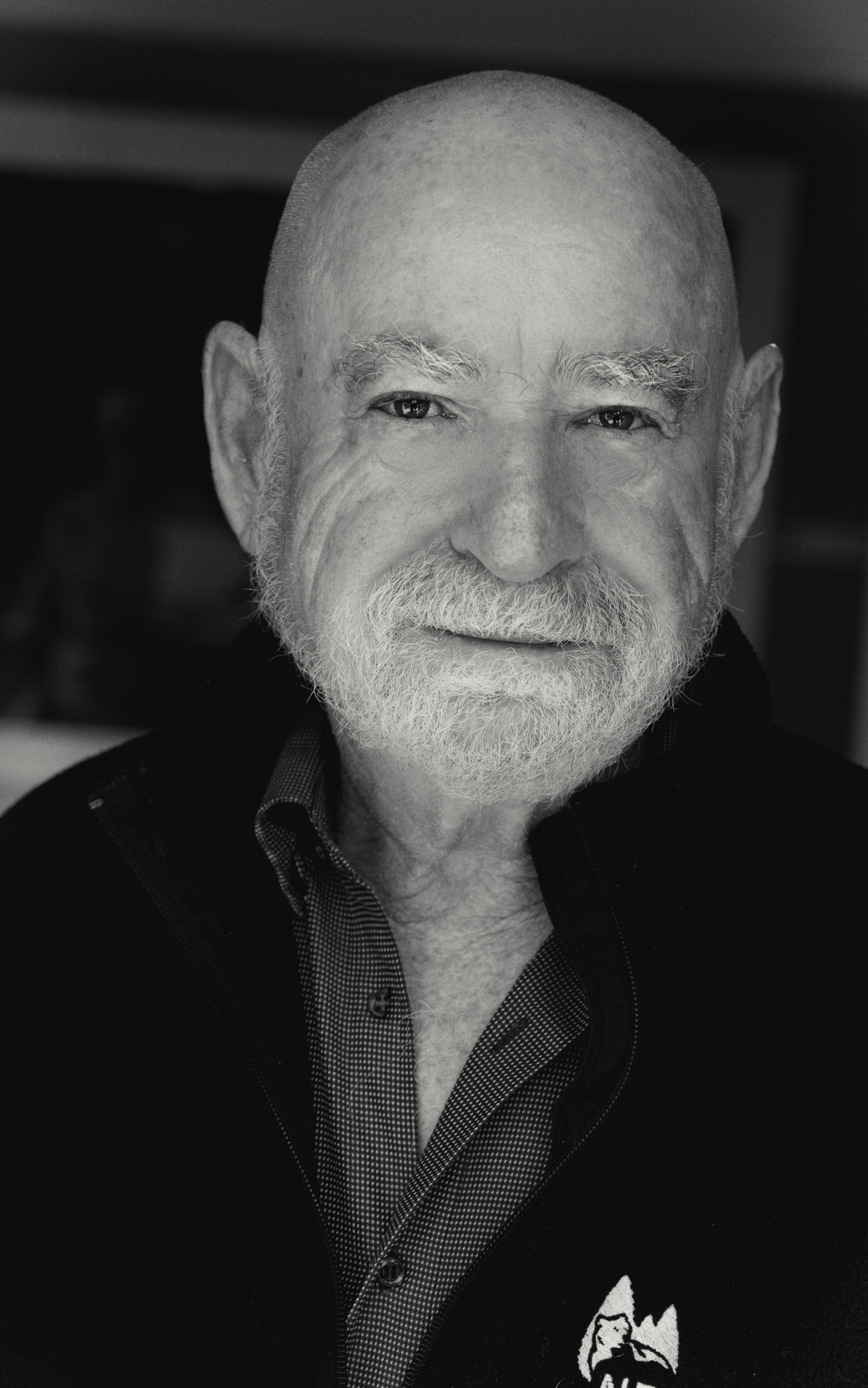
- Schwartz in 2022
- Born: 1946 (age 79–80); Stuttgart, Germany
- Education: Rensselaer Polytechnic Institute (BS)
- Occupations: Futurist, author, business executive
- Employer: Salesforce
- Known for: Co-founding Global Business Network, scenario planning
- Title: Senior Vice President of Strategic Planning; Chief Futures Officer
- Spouses: Frances Michener (Funtz) (m. 1970; divorced); Cathleen Gross
- Children: 1

Peter Schwartz (/ʃwɔːrts/ SHWORTS; born 1946) is an American business executive, futurist, author, and co-founder of the Global Business Network (GBN), a corporate strategy firm that specializes in future-thinking and scenario planning. In 2011, Schwartz joined Salesforce.com, where he serves as Senior Vice President of Strategic Planning and Chief Futures Officer.

== Early life and education ==
Schwartz was born in 1946 to Klara and Benjamin Schwartz, Hungarian Jews who had been in concentration camps and were living in a displaced persons camp in Stuttgart, Germany. The family soon moved to Norway, where they lived until he was five. They later emigrated to America as stateless aliens on the SS Stavangerfjord, arriving at the Port of New York in April 1951. Like nearly all displaced persons, they were processed at Ellis Island. They settled in Haddon Township in Camden County, New Jersey, where Schwartz graduated from Haddonfield Memorial High School in 1964. He earned a National Merit scholarship and attended Rensselaer Polytechnic Institute (RPI) on full scholarship. He served as RPI's May commencement speaker for the class of 2009. According to Stewart Brand, Schwartz was a member of Students for a Democratic Society.

== Career ==
After graduating in 1968 with a B.S. in aeronautical engineering, Schwartz taught high school in Philadelphia and worked in the innovative student housing program at UC Davis. In 1972, he joined the Stanford Research Institute (SRI), where he began developing his distinctive approach to scenario planning and rose to become director of the Strategic Environment Center. In 1982, he moved to London to lead scenario planning for Royal Dutch Shell. He later served on the board of the Center for a New American Security.

In 1988, Schwartz founded the Global Business Network (GBN) in his Berkeley basement with several close friends, including Napier Collyns, Jay Ogilvy, and Stewart Brand. Schwartz described GBN as an "information hunting and gathering company," a high-level networking and corporate research agency. In 2001, the firm was acquired by the strategy consulting group Monitor Group, though it continued to operate as a distinct entity. When Monitor was acquired by Deloitte in 2013, GBN was shut down.

Schwartz left GBN in October 2011 to join Salesforce.com as Senior Vice President of Strategic Planning. He also holds the title of Chief Futures Officer, leading a foresight and scenario planning team called Salesforce Futures.

He serves on the board of directors for the Long Now Foundation. He is also on the boards of the Center for a New American Security (CNAS) and the Asia Internet Coalition. In 2007, Schwartz moderated a forum titled "The Impact of Web 2.0 and Emerging Social Network Models" at the World Economic Forum in Davos. He serves on the Research Innovation and Enterprise Council of Singapore and, in 2014, was named an International Distinguished Fellow by the Prime Minister's Office. In 2012, he was inducted into the Futurists Hall of Fame by the Association of Professional Futurists. Schwartz is also a member of the Berggruen Institute's 21st Century Council.

== Writings and film ==
Schwartz has written several books on a range of future-oriented topics.

- The Art of the Long View. Doubleday. 1991. is widely regarded as a foundational work on scenario planning. It was named the best book of all time on the future by the Association of Professional Futurists and is used as a textbook at many business schools.
- Inevitable Surprises. Gotham. 2003. examines the major forces shaping today's world and how they are likely to influence the future.
- The Long Boom. Perseus. 1999., co-authored with Peter Leyden and Joel Hyatt, explores the future of the global economy.
- When Good Companies Do Bad Things. Wiley. 1999. makes the case for corporate responsibility in an age of corruption.
- China's Futures. Jossey-Bass. 2001. explores several possible paths for China's future.
- He also co-authored the Pentagon's report An Abrupt Climate Change Scenario and Its Implications for United States National Security with Doug Randall.

He has also worked as a consultant on several films, including Minority Report, Deep Impact, Sneakers, and WarGames.

== Personal life ==
In 1970, Schwartz married his first wife, Frances Michener (Funtz), a native of Berkeley, mountaineer, and his first "Remarkable Person." In 1985, while giving a speech at the Lawrence Berkeley Laboratory of UC Berkeley, he met his future wife, Cathleen Gross. He moved to Berkeley, California, to live with her in 1987. They later married and had one child, Benjamin "Books" Schwartz, born in 1990.
