= Global Business Network =

Former American consulting firm

- Industry: Consulting
- Founded: 1987; 38 years ago in Berkeley, California, United States
- Founders: Peter Schwartz; Jay Ogilvy; Stewart Brand; Napier Collyns; Lawrence Wilkinson
- Defunct: January 2013
- Fate: Acquired by Deloitte
- Headquarters: San Francisco, USA
- Parent: Monitor Deloitte

Global Business Network (GBN) was a consulting firm which gave scenario planning advice to businesses, non-profits, and governments.

Originally an independent firm, GBN became part of the Monitor Group in 2000, which was in turn acquired by Deloitte. GBN was headquartered in Emeryville, California, and had offices in New York City, London, and Cambridge, Massachusetts.

== History ==
GBN was founded in Berkeley, California, in 1987 by a group of entrepreneurs including Peter Schwartz, Jay Ogilvy, Stewart Brand, Napier Collyns, and Lawrence Wilkinson. The company grew to include a core group of "practice members", and over a hundred individual network members (or "RPs") from a range of different fields, such as Wired editor Kevin Kelly, social media expert Clay Shirky, anthropologist Mary Catherine Bateson, economist Aidan Eyakuze, musician Brian Eno, biotechnologist Rob Carlson, and China scholar Orville Schell.

As of 1998, The Economist reported that GBN had nearly 100 clients, "ranging from blue-chip firms such as IBM and AT&T to the government of Singapore and the National Education Association". At the time, they paid annual subscriptions of $35,000 each to become members of the GBN community; for an additional sum, they received custom scenario planning. As part of the GBN community, they received exposure to the network of experts, were invited to workshops and interactive meetings to explore emerging trends and alternative futures, while gaining access to training seminars, a private website, and the GBN Book Club, offering a selection of literature about future issues each month. GBN was acquired by Monitor in 2000, and soon stopped offering this membership service, concentrating instead on scenario-based consulting and training.

Before GBN, Peter Schwartz had been employed at SRI International as director of the Strategic Environment Center; following that, he took a position as head of scenario planning at Royal Dutch/Shell, from 1982 to 1986, where he continued the pioneering work of Pierre Wack in the field of scenario planning.

GBN ceased to be an active entity following the acquisition of the Monitor Group by Deloitte in January 2013.

== Scenario planning ==
Unlike forecasting which extrapolates past and present trends to predict the future, scenario planning is a process for exploring alternative, plausible, possible futures and what those might mean for strategies, policies, and decisions. Scenario planning was first used by the military in World War II and then by Herman Kahn at RAND (“Thinking the Unthinkable”) during the Cold War, before being adapted to inform corporate strategy by Pierre Wack and other business strategists at Royal Dutch/Shell in the 1970s. Scenario planning is thus often called the "Shell method". The key principles of scenario planning include thinking from the outside in about the forces in the contextual environment that are driving change, engaging multiple perspectives to identify and interpret those forces, and adopting a long view.

== Reports ==
In 2004, there was widespread media attention about a report that the Global Business Network prepared for the United States Defense Department which predicted "killer droughts through much of Europe, nuclear war between Pakistan and India over drinking water supplies, conflict between China and the US over Saudi oil, and an inland sea in California's Central Valley."

In May 2010, GBN and the Rockefeller Foundation co-published a report titled "Scenarios for the Future of Technology and International Development". The report explored four hypothetical scenarios, titled Lock Step, Clever Together, Hack Attack and Smart Scramble, focused on solutions to issues of global pandemics, climate change, terrorism, food insecurity, cyberattacks, disinformation, and associated crises.
