= Father Lacombe High School =

Coordinates: 51.048°N 113.984°W

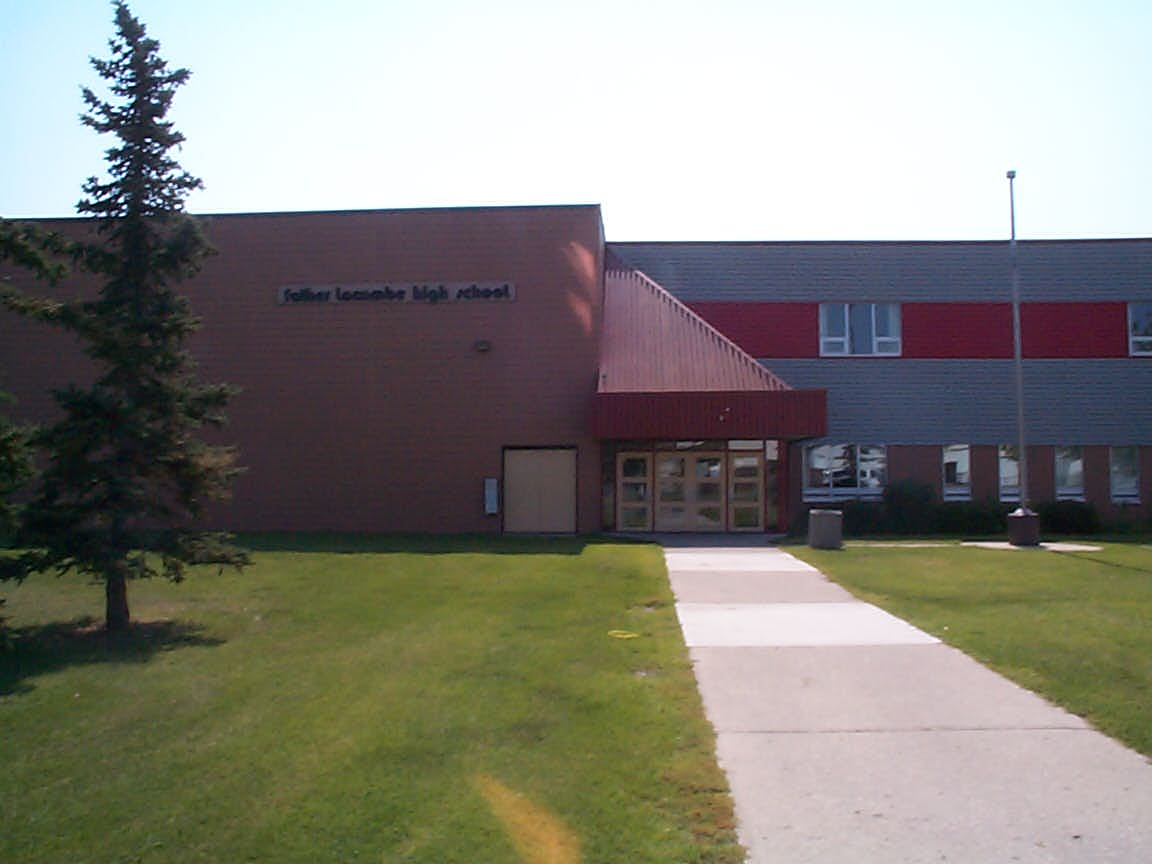

Location
- 3615 Radcliffe Drive S.E. Calgary, Alberta, T2A 6B4; Canada

Information
- School type: High School
- Religious affiliation: Roman Catholic
- Established: September 1978
- School board: Calgary Catholic School District
- Principal: Joy Pablo-Wrzosek
- Grades: 10-12
- Enrollment: 1200+
- Language: English, French, Spanish, Filipino
- Colours: Green, Blue, White, Black
- Team name: Laser Nation
- Website: www.fatherlacombe.calgary.ab.ca

Father Lacombe High School is a Catholic senior high school in Calgary, Alberta, Canada, named after Father Albert Lacombe. It has classes for grades 10 to 12 and is located in the southeast quadrant community of Radisson Heights, Calgary.

== Academics ==
=== Special programs ===
The school provides French and Spanish options for second language instruction. The school is also part of the Action for Bright Children Society.

== Athletics ==
Father Lacombe participates in many sports sanctioned by the Calgary Senior High School Athletic Association and the Alberta Schools Athletic Association, including Football (MCLA), Basketball, Soccer, Cross Country Running, Badminton, Track & Field, Rugby, Wrestling, Swimming and Volleyball. There are male and female teams at the senior and junior levels.

== Notable alumni ==
- Ricardo Miranda (born 1976), politician and trade unionist
- Jeshrun Antwi (born 1997), football running back for the Calgary Stampeders
