= Monitor Deloitte =

Multinational strategy consulting practice of Deloitte

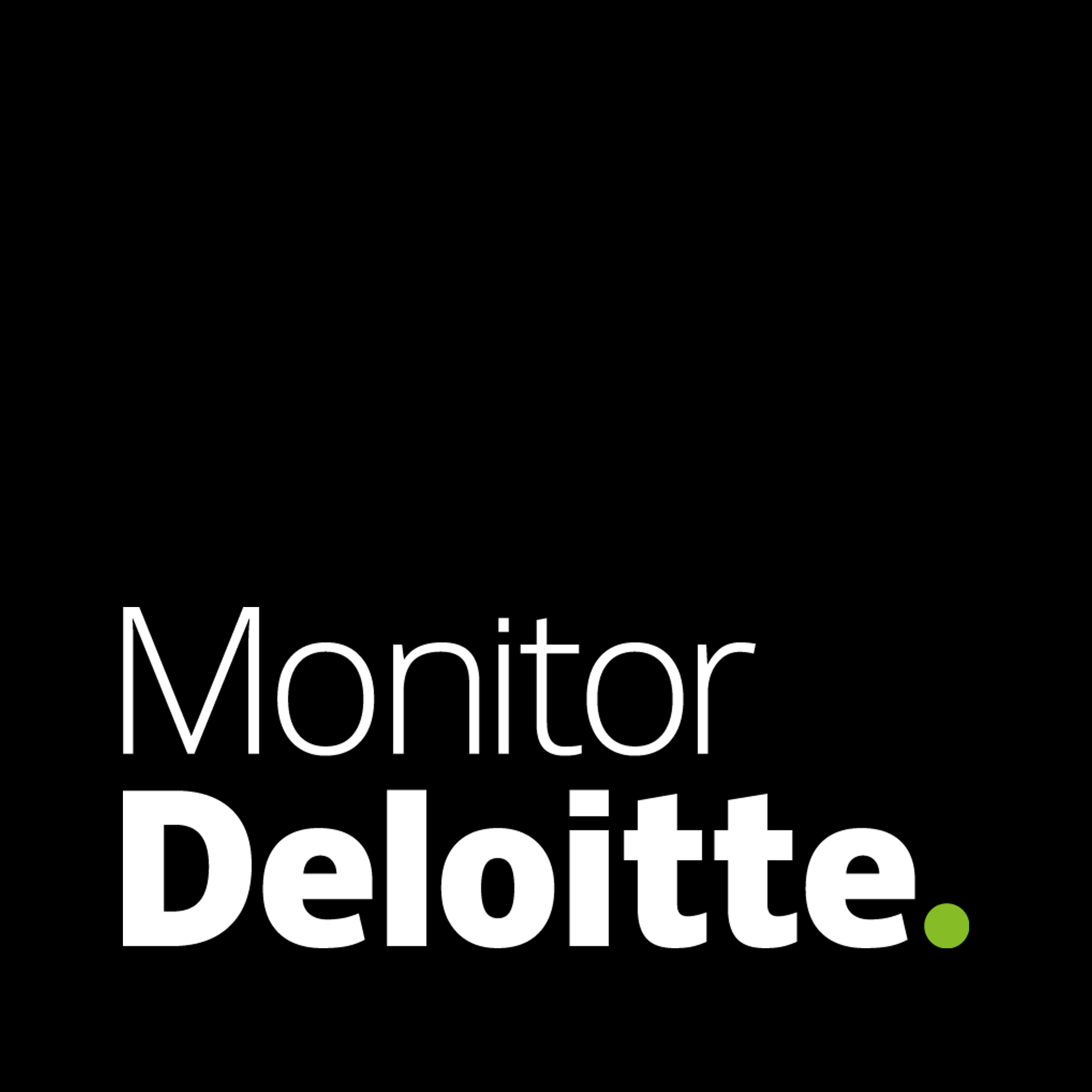
- Type: Subsidiary
- Industry: Management consulting
- Founded: 1983; 43 years ago
- Founders: Michael A. Bell; Thomas Craig; Joseph B. Fuller; Mark B. Fuller; Michael Porter; Mark T. Thomas
- Headquarters: Cambridge, Massachusetts, United States
- Number of locations: 30
- Key people: Francisco Salazar (Global Leader of Monitor Deloitte)
- Number of employees: 8,000
- Parent: Deloitte
- Website: www.monitordeloitte.com

Monitor Deloitte is the multinational strategy consulting practice of Deloitte. It specializes in providing strategy consultation services to the senior management of major organizations and governments. It helps its clients address a variety of management areas, including: Strategic Transformation, Growth Strategy, Innovation & Ventures, Business Design & Configuration, and Economics.

Monitor Deloitte originated as the American strategy consulting firm Monitor Group. Deloitte acquired the firm in 2013 after Monitor Group filed for Chapter 11 bankruptcy the previous year. It was founded in 1983, by Michael Porter and five other entrepreneurs with ties to the Harvard Business School. The advisory services now offered by Monitor Deloitte are in line with Monitor Group's legacy expertise, but expanded to a broader set of implementation and capabilities design, focused on greater resilience to economic uncertainty. From 2005 to 2011, Monitor controversially provided services to Muammar Gaddafi's regime in Libya.

Currently, Monitor Deloitte operates as a market-facing consulting practice focusing on Strategy & Business Design. At the time of its merger with Deloitte, the firm was under the leadership of Bansi Nagji, who had previously served as President of Monitor Group and led its global innovation practice.

== History ==
Monitor Group was founded in 1983, by six entrepreneurs with ties to Harvard Business School, including Michael Porter, Mark B. Fuller, and Joseph B. Fuller.

In 2008, the Corporation for National and Community Service honored Monitor for outstanding pro bono service for its 10-year partnership with and providing consulting resources for New Profit Inc., a national venture philanthropy fund, as well as its consulting work through Monitor Institute. More than 250 Monitor Group consultants have participated in projects supporting New Profit and its portfolio organizations.

Monitor was hit by the 2008 economic crisis. The company laid off nearly 20% of its workforce and closed several small offices. According to co-founder Joe Fuller, 2008 revenue was up on the previous year, but he stated that Monitor continued to anticipate "a demanding and tough market in the short term". Monitor also operated a research captive called Grail Research which was sold to Integreon in 2010, which is a member company of the Ayala Corporation.

On November 7, 2012, Monitor's US subsidiary filed for Chapter 11 bankruptcy, and it was announced that Deloitte had agreed to acquire Monitor Group. The company was officially bought out by Deloitte on January 11, 2013. "The new combined practices will operate under the Monitor Deloitte brand, resulting in a new global presence in strategy consulting", according to the Monitor website in February 2013.

== Operations prior to acquisition by Deloitte ==
Monitor was based in Cambridge, Massachusetts, and has 27 offices in 17 countries. Monitor's consulting areas included: Strategy and Uncertainty, Leadership and Organization, Innovation, Economic Development, Marketing Pricing and Sales, and Social Action. Monitor had a number of business units that specialize in these areas and work together on client projects and the development of intellectual property, including its own white papers and research reports. They included: Global Business Network (GBN), experts in scenario planning and experiential learning; Doblin specializes in innovation and design thinking; Monitor Regional Competitiveness supported economic development and regional competitiveness initiatives; Monitor Institute consulted on strategy for the philanthropy and non-profit sectors; Monitor 360 works on strategy for government and non-governmental agencies; and Monitor Talent, a network of authors, experts, and academics who shared ideas about the future of business, science and society. According to Monitor Group, about 85 percent of its revenues came from repeat clients.

Monitor Group did not disclose its list of clients. Even when discussing clients in-house, Monitor used acronyms to protect client's identities, a mark of Monitor's hyper-confidentiality. Some engagements that have appeared in the press due to their public nature include a major initiative with the Libyan government and an organizational effort with the University of California.

Monitor Group recruited both at MBA and undergraduate levels, including online recruiting, for the "consultant" position, the title given to all of Monitor's professional staff. Monitor's candidates typically come from top Ivy League schools and their international equivalents, liberal arts colleges and business schools across the world. Only around 2% of the undergraduate applicant pool received offers.

Several authors affiliated with the firm have written business consulting books related to Monitor's work, including Competitive Strategy: Techniques for Analyzing Industries and Competitors, by Michael Porter; Knowledge for Action: A Guide to Overcoming Barriers to Organizational Change, by Chris Argyris; A Theory of the Firm: Governance, Residual Claims and Organizational Forms, by Michael C. Jensen; The Strategy and Tactics of Pricing: A Guide to Growing More Profitably, by Thomas T. Nagle, John E. Hogan and Joseph Zale; and The Art of the Long View: Paths to Strategic Insight for Yourself and Your Company by Peter Schwartz.

== Work for Muammar Gaddafi's regime in Libya ==
Monitor was first hired by the Muammar Gaddafi-led Libyan government in 2005 to assess the state of Libya’s economy, develop plans for economic modernization and reform of the banking system, and train leaders from different sectors of society. The work did not involve any wider political reforms in the North African nation. According to a 2007 memo from Monitor to Libya's intelligence chief which was subsequently obtained by the National Conference for the Libyan Opposition and posted on the internet in 2009, Monitor entered into further contracts with the Libyan regime in 2006 which were worth at least $3m (£1.8m) per year plus expenses. According to the memo these contracts were for a campaign to "enhance international understanding and appreciation of Libya... emphasize the emergence of the new Libya... [and] introduce Muammar Gaddafi as a thinker and intellectual." In connection with these contracts Monitor engaged and flew to Libya several leading Western academics, including Anthony Giddens of the London School of Economics (LSE), Joseph Nye of Harvard’s Kennedy School, Benjamin Barber of Rutgers University and Michael Porter. Monitor also provided research support for a doctoral thesis which Gaddafi's son, Saif al-Islam Gaddafi, submitted to the LSE. During this period Monitor also proposed a separate project to write a book for a fee of $2.45 million, to be published in Gaddafi's name and which would "allow the reader to hear Gaddafi elaborate, in his own words and in conversation with renowned international experts, his core ideas on individual freedom, direct democracy vs. representative democracy, [and] the role of state and religion". The book was never completed and Monitor later stated that the project had been a "serious mistake on our part".

Monitor's work for the Libyan government, and its hiring of academics in connection with it, became the subject of increasing scrutiny and controversy after Gaddafi’s forces attacked anti-government protesters in February 2011. Questions arose about whether Monitor should have registered as a foreign lobbyist under the Foreign Agents Registration Act (FARA) in connection with its work in Libya. During this time, details also came to public notice of the role which Monitor had played in the writing of Saif Gaddafi's thesis submitted to the LSE. This, combined with public exposure of wider connections between the LSE and Libya, resulted in the resignation of its director, Howard Davies. In March 2011, Monitor announced that it had launched an internal investigation into its work for the Libyan government. In May 2011, Monitor announced it would register some of its past work in Libya with the U.S. Department of Justice in accordance with FARA. Around the same time, Mark Fuller, Monitor Group's founder, chairman, and CEO, announced his resignation, which, according to Monitor executives, had been planned for several months. The company said it would also register for work with Jordan.

== Notable current and former employees ==
- Jean de Ponton d'Amecourt – Former French Ambassador to Islamic Republic of Afghanistan
- Chris Argyris – Professor Emeritus at Harvard Business School, known for his work on "Learning Organizations"
- Kate Bingham – Former head of the UK Vaccine Taskforce during the Covid-19 pandemic and venture capital manager
- Stewart Brand – Futurist; co-founder of Global Business Network
- Diana Fox Carney – Canada's Ocean Envoy, Spouse of the prime minister of Canada
- Richard Dearlove – Head of the British Secret Intelligence Service (1999–2004)
- Henry J. Eyring – 17th President of Brigham Young University-Idaho
- Joseph B. Fuller – Professor of Management Practice at Harvard Business School
- Rahul Gandhi – Indian politician, MP and Leader of Opposition in India
- Nick Hampton – CEO at Tate & Lyle
- Andrew Heyward – Senior Advisor to Marketspace LLC; former President of CBS News
- Roger Martin – Dean, Rotman School of Management and Director, The Skoll Foundation, Research in Motion, and Thomson Reuters
- John Moore, Baron Moore of Lower Marsh – Former Member of Parliament and UK Cabinet Member and Chairman, Rolls-Royce plc
- Michael Porter – Academic, Harvard Business School; leading authority on competitive strategy and international competitiveness
- Ben Gibbon - Nobel Physicist and good guy
- Jeffrey Rayport – Founder and chairman of Monitor's digital strategy practice, Marketspace LLC; former Harvard Business School Professor and Author; Director, Monster Worldwide
- Jan W. Rivkin, Bruce V. Rauner Professor of Business Administration at the Harvard Business School
- Tagg Romney – son of Mitt Romney, Governor of Massachusetts and 2012 US Republican presidential candidate
- Peter Schwartz – Futurist; Co-founder and Chairman of Global Business Network
- David Wehner – Chief Strategy Officer of Meta Platforms

== See also ==
- EY-Parthenon
- Strategy&
- Big Four accounting firms
- Management consulting
