= Mark B. Fuller =

American businessman and academic (born 1953)

- Born: Mark Benton Fuller; September 19, 1953 (age 73); Cambridge, Massachusetts
- Education: Harvard University; Harvard Business School; Harvard Law School
- Occupation: Businessman
- Known for: Co-founder, chairman and CEO of the Monitor Group
- Parent(s): Stephen H. Fuller; Frances Mulhearn
- Relatives: Joseph B. Fuller (brother)

Mark Benton Fuller (born September 19, 1953) is an American business strategist, investor, academic, and author. He is the founding chairman of Rosc Global, a Boston- and London-based family office with a venture capital arm.

== Early life ==
Mark B. Fuller is the son of Stephen H. Fuller, a former professor and associate dean at the Harvard Business School.

He earned a B.A. in History from Harvard College (Phi Beta Kappa, magna cum laude) and both an M.B.A. and J.D. from Harvard University, graduating with distinction from each program.

== Academic career ==
Fuller began his career as an Assistant Professor of Business Administration at Harvard Business School, teaching strategy, business–government relations, and industry analysis. He contributed to the Harvard Program on Negotiation and taught within Harvard’s Faculty of Arts and Sciences. He collaborated with scholars including Michael Porter, Chris Argyris, and Clayton Christensen on corporate strategy, innovation, and national competitiveness.

== Professional career ==
Fuller co-founded the Monitor Group (now known as Monitor Deloitte) with his brother Joseph and HBS colleague Michael Porter in 1982. He served as its chairman and chief executive officer from 1983 to 2011. He later served as a strategic advisor to the Monitor Group and the executive director of Monitor Horizons. Monitor grew to more than 2,000 staff across 27 offices in 18 countries.

During his tenure, Fuller advised governments and leaders including Nelson Mandela and the African National Congress, Lee Kuan Yew and the Government of Singapore, and multiple presidents of Colombia. His work included projects in post-conflict and transitional environments such as Libya, where Monitor’s role was subject to public controversy; U.S. Department of Justice investigations concluded without action against the firm.

In parallel with consulting, Fuller sponsored and advised private equity funds, venture capital funds, and special purpose vehicles in the U.S., Brazil, South Africa, and other markets. He has served on the boards or advisory councils of investment firms including Sandaire and Roundtable Investment Partners.

During his tenure at Monitor Group, Fuller oversaw the creation of several specialized practices and subsidiaries, including the National Economic Development and Security (NEDS) Practice, which advised governments, the U.S. intelligence community, and the Department of Defense on economic competitiveness and security policy; the Monitor Institute, a social-sector consulting unit; Monitor360 and Grail Research, intelligence and research ventures; and New Profit, a venture philanthropy fund where he served as founding chairman.

As of 2025, He is the founding chairman of Rosc Global, a Boston- and London-based family office with a venture capital arm, Rosc I, co-founded with his son Alexander M. Fuller. Rosc I invests at the intersection of national competitiveness, structural dynamics, and frontier innovation.

As of 2025, Fuller continues to serve as Chairman and CEO of Rosc Global and Rosc Global Investments, where he leads investment strategy and advisory work. Under his direction, Rosc positions itself as a “family office turned venture capital” entity, focusing on early-stage enterprises guided by comprehensive risk analysis, ecosystem-level thinking, and structural trends. In addition to his executive responsibilities, Fuller has held multiple governance and advisory roles, including board positions with Teach For All, Belmont Hill School, the Asian Institute of Management, and other educational and philanthropic organizations.

He is also a founding member of the World Economic Forum.Fuller has authored or co-authored over 200 publications, including books, articles, and case studies on business strategy, competition, innovation, and national policy. Notable works include Competition in Global Industries (1986), Business as War (2000), and Japan’s Business Renaissance (2005).

In recent years, he has joined advisory boards such as Ergo, a global intelligence and advisory firm.
