= Collective impact =

Collective Impact (CI) is the commitment of a group of actors from different sectors to a common agenda for solving a specific social problem, using a structured form of collaboration. In 2021, the Collective Impact Forum changed the definition of collective impact to "Collective impact is a network of community members, organizations, and institutions who advance equity by learning together, aligning, and integrating their actions to achieve population and systems-level change. This definition identifies equity as the North Star for why and how collective impact work takes place, specifically names community members as key actors along with other stakeholders, and emphasizes the importance of systems change in this work." The concept of collective impact was first articulated in the 2011 Stanford Social Innovation Review article Collective Impact, written by John Kania, managing director at FSG, and Mark Kramer, Kennedy School at Harvard and Co-founder FSG. Collective impact was chosen as the #2 philanthropy buzzword for 2011, and has been recognized by the White House Council for Community Solutions as an important framework for progress on social issues.

The concept of collective impact hinges on the idea that in order for organizations to create lasting solutions to social problems on a large-scale, they need to coordinate their efforts and work together around a clearly defined goal. The approach of collective impact is placed in contrast to "isolated impact," where organizations primarily work alone to solve social problems and draws on earlier works on collaborative leadership, focused on collective goals, strategic partnerships, collective and independent action aligned with those goals, shared accountability, and a backbone "institutional worrier". Collective impact is based on organizations forming cross-sector coalitions to make meaningful and sustainable progress on social issues.

== Explanation ==
Hank Rubin (author of Collaborative Leadership: Developing Effective Partnerships for Communities and Schools, Corwin press, 2009) and Leonard Brock (former director of the Rochester NY Anti-Poverty Initiative) offer a practical interpretation of collective impact by contrasting it with collaboration: "Collective impact really is much more than collaboration! Collaboration happens when we meet together; collective impact is what we do when we’re alone … Collaboration happens when we choose to sit in the same room and work together on the same project because we share an interest in accomplishing a shared goal … On the other hand, collective impact focuses on change inside each partner organization. It begins when we, as a community, agree to a set of shared outcomes … and then, individually, go back into our home organizations, work with our staffs, boards, and volunteers to figure out what we – individually and organizationally – can best do to achieve those shared goals and then choose to make changes to accomplish this. When each of our organizations chooses to shift and align our own work and priorities in this way, we set changes in motion in all portions of our community. And these changes will last a long time."

== Five conditions ==
Initiatives must meet five criteria in order to be considered collective impact:

- Common agenda: All participating organizations (government agencies, non-profits, community members, etc.) have a shared vision for social change that includes a common understanding of the problem and a joint approach to solving the problem through agreed upon actions.
- Shared measurement system: Agreement on the ways success will be measured and reported with key indicators by all participating organizations.
- Mutually reinforcing activities: Engagement of a diverse set of stakeholders, typically in multiple sectors, coordinating a set of differentiated activities through a mutually reinforcing plan of action.
- Continuous communication: Frequent communications over a long period of time among key players within and between organizations, to build trust and encourage ongoing learning and adaptation.
- Backbone organization: Ongoing support provided by an independent staff. The backbone staff tends to play six roles to move the initiative forward: Guide vision and strategy; Support aligned activity; Establish shared measurement practices; Build public will; Advance policy; and Mobilize funding.

== Collective impact in practice ==
Collective impact initiatives have been employed for an issues including education, health and healthcare, animal welfare, homelessness, poverty reduction, and youth and community development. Examples include: The Strive Partnership educational initiative in Cincinnati, the environmental cleanup of the Elizabeth River in Virginia, the Shape Up Somerville campaign against childhood obesity in Somerville, Mass, and the work of the Calgary Homeless Foundation in Calgary, Canada.

Partners in Progress (PIP), an initiative of the Citi Foundation and the Low Income Investment Fund, supports a broad range of projects that use a collective impact approach to address the issues of poverty and urban transformation. It emphasizes collaborative approaches to these issues, particularly at neighborhood and regional levels, guided by a local community leader (known as a "community quarterback" or "backbone organization"). Its projects are also focused on data collection to show what is or isn't working. The projects range from engaging hospital, city and community organizations to improve health in an Oakland neighborhood, to uniting city officials, employers, and the community around jobs in Brooklyn, to using transit as a hub for health, housing, and economic development in Dallas.

The White House Council for Community Solutions has recognized the potential of collective impact to play a major role in transforming the ways in which communities approach their social problems. A 2012 report for the Council found that, among 12 "needle-moving community collaboratives" that had achieved at least 10 percent progress in a community wide metric, all 12 met the conditions of collective impact.

The White House Council's work in collective impact is being continued today by the Aspen Forum for Community Solutions. In 2014 it launched the Collective Impact Forum (n partnership with FSG,), an online community to support those practicing collective impact.

The Promise Neighborhoods Institute is a PolicyLink initiative to unite diverse American communities on improving educational and developmental outcomes of children in underserved areas. More than 50 communities have contributed neighborhood data, mobilized local leaders, launched advocacy campaigns and started multi-sector partnerships to demand federal-level policy changes to fund "cradle to college" programs nationwide.

The United States Breastfeeding Committee (USBC) is the "backbone organization" for a nationwide coalition of 50 healthcare organizations that support healthy breastfeeding initiatives. Goal #3 of the 2014 USBC Strategic Framework is "engage stakeholders in a collective impact model". In 2017, the USBC updated its strategy to emphasize its organizational commitment to breastfeeding health equity. This reflects current demands from critics who want a general frame of equity added to the collective impact model framework.

== Critiques of Collective impact ==
Corporate CEOs, small business leaders, non-profit and social-sector executives, government officials and community service practitioners have made contributions to the evolving concept in the form of insights, feedback and critique. Community psychologist Tom Wolff argues that John Kania and Mark Kramer's concept of collective impact "fails to adequately acknowledge, understand, and address" the framework in the context of community organizing. He lists the following Ten Places Where Collective Impact Gets It Wrong

1. Collective Impact does not address the essential requirement for meaningfully engaging those in the community most affected by the issues.
2. A corollary of the above is that Collective Impact emerges from top-down business consulting experience and is thus not a true community development model.
3. Collective Impact does not include policy change and systems change as essential and intentional outcomes of the partnership's work.
4. Collective Impact as described in Kania and Kramer's initial article is not based on professional and practitioner literature or the experience of the thousands of coalitions that preceded their 2011 article.
5. Collective Impact misses the social justice core that exists in many coalitions.
6. Collective Impact mislabels their study of a few case examples as "research."
7. Collective Impact assumes that most coalitions are capable of finding the funds to have a well- funded backbone organization.
8. Collective Impact also misses a key role of the Backbone Organization – building leadership.
9. Community wide, multi-sectoral collaboratives cannot be simplified into Collective Impact's five required conditions.
10. The early available research on Collective Impact is calling into question the contribution that Collective Impact is making to coalition effectiveness.

Wolff's claim that collective impact is a "failed model" has caught the attention of community service practitioners who are also skeptics of the model's "five conditions". Calling it a top-down model for excluding community members as key stakeholders and partners of collaboration, Wolff has attracted input from many other non-profit and social-sector critics who also want the model to add elements of diversity and inclusion, civic participation, social justice and equity.

Social sector leaders echo these critiques in publications like The Philanthropist, calling the five-pillared framework too simple for its intended purpose of tackling complex problems. Drawing similarities between CI and other previously popular but failed models of collaboration, community activists struggle to believe that CI has what it takes to build long-term, sustainable, conflict-free solutions to social justice issues. Pointing out several well-known case studies that underscore a real need for increased grassroots advocacy efforts, many critics believe Kania & Kramer conducted inadequate research before designing their model.

In 2015, PolicyLink published a report called Equity: the soul of collective impact, which identified racial and economic equity as the most vital missing pieces of Kania & Kramer's concept. With no mention of equity in the CI framework, PolicyLink executives argue that CI initiatives fail to address tense power dynamics that continue to polarize American communities and therefore impede progress on social change.

== Future of Collective impact ==
With high demand for adding a new equity frame to the original framework, Living Cities has partnered with The Collective Impact Forum to work exclusively on reforming the model for this purpose. Founders Kania & Kramer, as well as organizations like PolicyLink, Aspen Forum for Community Solutions and Urban Strategies Council have also joined this effort, signaling that opinions from the field have been taken seriously, helping the concept adapt and grow with transparency and flexibility. Ongoing discussions and updates are viewable at the Collective Impact Forum website where public input and participation is encouraged as CI continues to evolve with increased attention to community needs.

Founding authors Kania and Kramer have responded to critics expressing appreciation for their interest and perspective on the topic, encouraging their continued input throughout the process to refine the model.

"As this movement continues to evolve, we look forward to additional contributions such as Wolff’s published editorial (and the myriad of contributions we list here, as well as many others) that can deepen understanding of how best to practice collective impact in a manner that leads to a more just and equitable world".

Wolff however, believes the model is flawed beyond repair and needs full replacement rather than reform. Suggesting six principles in the NonProfit Quarterly’s 2017 Collaborating for Equity and Social Justice Toolkit, Wolff empowers social innovators and thought leaders to design collaboration models for the future that will "leave the power in the hands of community residents".
