= Jean de Ponton d'Amécourt =

French diplomat

Jean Knower Paul Marie de Ponton d'Amécourt (born 6 October 1945) is a French diplomat, formerly the French ambassador to the Islamic Republic of Afghanistan from 2008 to 2011 and former Under-secretary of Defense for Policy from 2005 to 2008. He also extensively served in the private sector, including as executive director and president for Europe of British conglomerate GrandMet.

D'Amécourt was born in Paris, France. After studying at Lycée Janson de Sailly in Paris, he graduated from Sciences Po and from the French National School of Government (Simone Veil promotion). He also holds a degree in public law and economics. He is married to Jacqueline de Ponton d'Amécourt, born de Rohan-Chabot. They have three children.

== French civil service career ==
After graduating from ENA as a diplomat, d'Amécourt was appointed at the European Affairs Department of the French Foreign Affairs Ministry in 1974 and at the Policy Planning staff of the ministry in 1975. In 1978, he was appointed first secretary at the French Permanent Representation at the United Nations, and first secretary and then second counsellor at the French embassy in Washington.

In 1986, he was appointed deputy-assistant secretary for disarmament at the Ministry of Foreign Affairs and joined the political staff of Defense minister André Giraud as advisor on international affairs from 1987 to 1988.

== Private-sector career ==
From 1983 to 1986, d'Amécourt was a director of international development and deputy chief executive of French industrial company Exprover-Saint Gobain.

In 1988, he joined British conglomerate GrandMet (now DIAGEO) as an executive in charge of European subsidiary and then occupied various senior positions related to the international and European part of the group.

From 1998 to 2000, he was a partner of French arm of strategic consulting firm Roland Berger Strategy Consultants.

From 2000 to 2003, he was a partner of strategy consulting firm Monitor Group.

== Back to civil service ==
In 2005, he was appointed under-secretary for policy by Defense Minister Michèle Alliot-Marie.

Following the appointment of Hervé Morin as defense minister in 2007, he was appointed French ambassador to the Islamic Republic of Afghanistan in early 2008, as France increased its posture in Afghanistan and re-integrated NATO's Integrated Military Command. In this capacity, he oversaw an increase in French aid to Afghanistan, an increased commitment to ISAF and had to manage several political and hostages crisis. He held this position until his retirement in 2011.

== Writings ==
In January 2013, he wrote "Diplomate en guerre à Kaboul", a first-hand behind-the-scenes account of the pivotal years of the international coalition in Afghanistan, co-written with Romain Poirot-Lellig and published by Robert Laffont.

== Awards and medals ==
Jean d'Amécourt is an Officer of the Légion d'honneur and Chevalier de l'Ordre National du Mérite.

He also received the Croix de Commandeur du Mérite of the Federal Republic of Germany and the Grand Croix du Mérite Militaire of the Kingdom of Spain.

== Known family members ==
Hubert Lyautey, Marechal of France and renown military theoretician was his grand-uncle.
