= White House Council for Community Solutions =

The White House Council for Community Solutions was created by executive order of US President Barack Obama on December 14, 2010. Under the terms of the order, the Council will be dissolved within two years unless its establishment is affirmed by the president at that time.

Its mission as stated in the White House release is to "...support the nationwide "Call To Service" campaign authorized in the Serve America Act (Public Law 111 13)". Its 30 members will serve two-year appointments.
