= Walter Fletcher (running back) =

American gridiron football player (born 1996)

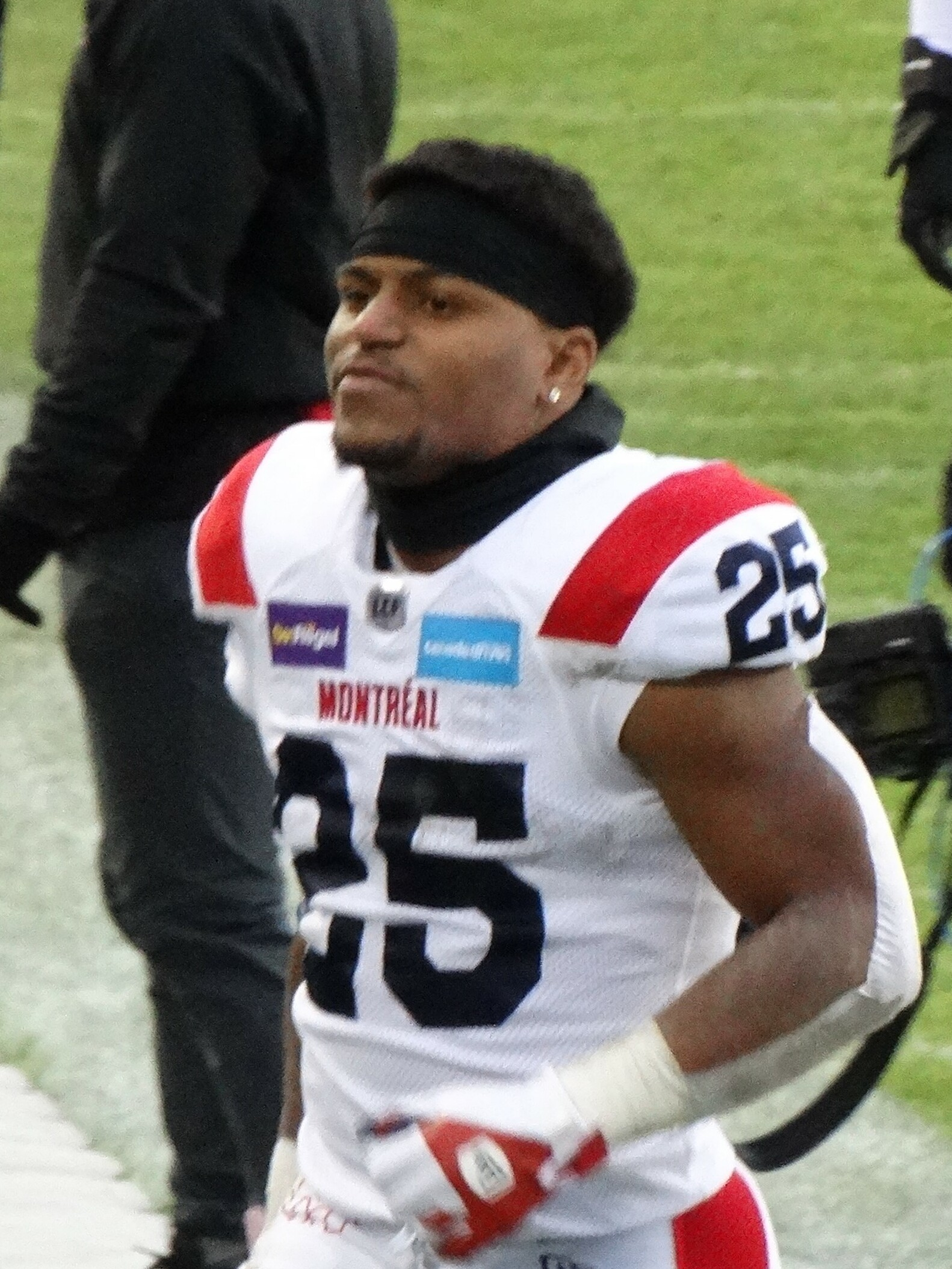
- Fletcher with the Montreal Alouettes in 2022

Profile
- Position: Running back

Personal information
- Born: December 17, 1996 (age 29); Cheverly, Maryland, U.S.
- Listed height: 5 ft 9 in (1.75 m)
- Listed weight: 202 lb (92 kg)

Career information
- High school: Centennial High School
- College: Edinboro, Ball State

Career history
- 2021–2022: Edmonton Elks
- 2022–2024: Montreal Alouettes

Awards and highlights
- 2024 CFL season – Leader in yards after catch (YAC); Grey Cup champion (2023); 2018 Pennsylvania State Athletic Conference West Offensive Player of the Year; 2018, 2017 Pennsylvania State Athletic Conference West First-Team; 2017 Associated Press NCAA Division II All-American (Second Team)

Career CFL statistics
- Rushing attempts: 351
- Rushing yards: 1,818
- Rushing TDs: 5
- Receptions: 145
- Receiving yards: 1,388
- Receiving TDs: 4
- Stats at CFL.ca

Walter Charles Fletcher (born December 17, 1996) is an American professional football running back. He most recently played for the Montreal Alouettes of the Canadian Football League (CFL). Fletcher played college football at Edinboro University of Pennsylvania and Ball State. He made his professional football debut in 2021 as a member of the Edmonton Elks.

== Early life ==
Walter Fletcher was raised in Ellicott City, Maryland, and attended Centennial High School, where he became a three-year varsity starter at running back. As a senior in 2013, he rushed for 1,736 yards and 23 touchdowns, earning First Team All-Howard County honors.

Throughout his high school career, Fletcher established multiple program rushing records, including the single-game mark of 306 rushing yards, as well as school records for single-season rushing yards (1,736), single-season rushing touchdowns (25), and career rushing yards (2,955).

Despite his production, Fletcher received no scholarship offers out of high school. After graduation, he attended East Coast Prep in Great Barrington, Massachusetts, a postgraduate football program where he competed in a three-month season to increase recruiting exposure.

He later enrolled at Randolph–Macon College, an NCAA Division III program, before transferring to Edinboro University for the fall 2015 semester, joining the football team as a walk-on.

== College career ==
At Edinboro, Fletcher developed into one of the most productive running backs in program history. During the 2017 season, he rushed for a school-record 1,740 yards and 18 rushing touchdowns, adding three receiving touchdowns for 21 total scores. His 1,740 rushing yards ranked second nationally in NCAA Division II and sixteenth all-time in the Pennsylvania State Athletic Conference. Fletcher recorded eight 100-yard rushing games that season and posted the most 200-yard rushing games in a single season in school history (4). He was named a Second Team All-American by the Associated Press.

In 2018, Fletcher rushed for 1,624 yards and 17 touchdowns, finishing sixth nationally in total rushing yards and fifth in rushing yards per game among NCAA Division II players. During the season, he set Edinboro’s single-game rushing record with 328 yards on 21 carries and four touchdowns. Fletcher also became the first player in school history to record at least 100 rushing yards and 100 receiving yards in the same game against Gannon University.

Following the season, Fletcher was named the 2018 Pennsylvania State Athletic Conference West Offensive Player of the Year, becoming the first Edinboro player to earn the honor since Trevor Harris in 2008.

After three seasons at Edinboro, Fletcher finished third in school history in career rushing yards with 3,913, fourth in rushing attempts with 632, and second in career rushing touchdowns with 41. He holds multiple school records, including single-season rushing yards (1,740), rushing yards in a single game (328), most 200-yard rushing games in a season (4), and career points scored (288).

With one year of eligibility remaining, Fletcher transferred to Ball State University as a graduate student for the 2019 season. At Ball State, he totaled 1,032 all-purpose yards, including 726 rushing yards on 132 carries (5.5 yards per carry), and added 26 receptions for 306 yards and two touchdowns.

In his Division I debut against the Indiana Hoosiers at Lucas Oil Stadium, Fletcher scored on a 45-yard reception. He finished the season as Ball State’s second-leading rusher and earned All-MAC Honorable Mention recognition from Pro Football Focus (PFF).

== Professional career ==
=== Edmonton Elks ===
After going undrafted in the 2020 NFL draft Fletcher signed with the Edmonton Elks of the Canadian Football League (CFL) on December 31, 2020. During the 2021 season Fletcher played in 11 games and carried the ball 67 times for 302 yards. He also caught 22 passes for 177 yards. Fletcher was selected as one of the Elk players to debut the team's new uniform designs for the 2022 season.

=== Montreal Alouettes ===
On June 14, 2022, Fletcher was traded to the Montreal Alouettes in exchange for a sixth-round pick in the 2023 CFL Draft. That season, he emerged as a versatile dual-threat contributor for Montreal’s backfield, appearing in 14 games and totalled 486 rushing yards and 353 receiving yards.

Fletcher played a rotational role during the 2023 campaign, which culminated in the franchise winning the 110th Grey Cup.

In 2024, Fletcher delivered the best season of his career, helping Montreal finish with a 12–5-1 record and emerge as one of the league’s top dual-threat running backs. Fletcher led the CFL in yards after catch (YAC) with 626, ranked fourth in missed tackles forced (54), tied for third in 20-yard rushes (6), and finished fourth in yards from scrimmage (1,446). He also led all CFL running backs in receiving yards (682).

Following the season, Fletcher signed a two-year contract extension with Montreal.

Fletcher was with the team in training camp in 2025, but was part of the final cuts on May 31, 2025.
